= 2008 in South Korean football =

Football in South Korea
- Season: 2008

Men's football
- K League: Suwon Samsung Bluewings
- National League: Hyundai Mipo Dockyard
- K3 League: Yangju Citizen
- Korean FA Cup: Pohang Steelers
- Korean League Cup: Suwon Samsung Bluewings

This article shows a summary of the 2008 football season in South Korea.

== National teams ==
=== FIFA World Cup qualification ===
| 6 February AFC third round, Group 3 | South Korea | 4–0 | Turkmenistan | Seoul, South Korea |
| | Kwak Tae-hwi 43'; Seol Ki-hyeon 57', 83'; Park Ji-sung 70' |

| 26 March AFC third round, Group 3 | South Korea | 0–0 | North Korea | Shanghai, China |

| 31 May AFC third round, Group 3 | South Korea | 2–2 | Jordan | Seoul, South Korea |
| | Park Ji-sung 39'; Park Chu-young 48' (pen.) | | Abdel-Fattah 73', 80' |

| 7 June AFC third round, Group 3 | Jordan | 0–1 | South Korea | Amman, Jordan |
| | | | Park Chu-young 24' (pen.) |

| 14 June AFC third round, Group 3 | Turkmenistan | 1–3 | South Korea | Ashgabat, Turkmenistan |
| | Öwekow 77' (pen.) | | Kim Do-heon 14', 86', 90+3' (pen.) |

| 22 June AFC third round, Group 3 | South Korea | 0–0 | North Korea | Seoul, South Korea |

AFC third round, Group 3 table
| Pos | Team | Pld | W | D | L | GF | GA | GD | Pts | Qualification |
|---|---|---|---|---|---|---|---|---|---|---|
| 1 | South Korea | 6 | 3 | 3 | 0 | 10 | 3 | +7 | 12 | Advance to AFC fourth round |
| 2 | North Korea | 6 | 3 | 3 | 0 | 4 | 0 | +4 | 12 | Advance to AFC fourth round |
| 3 | Jordan | 6 | 2 | 1 | 3 | 6 | 6 | 0 | 7 | |
| 4 | Turkmenistan | 6 | 0 | 1 | 5 | 1 | 12 | −11 | 1 | |

Source: RSSSF

| 10 September AFC fourth round, Group B | South Korea | 1–1 | North Korea | Shanghai, China |
| | Ki Sung-yueng 69' | | Hong Yong-jo 64' (pen.) |

| 15 October AFC fourth round, Group B | South Korea | 4–1 | United Arab Emirates | Seoul, South Korea |
| | Lee Keun-ho 20', 80'; Park Ji-sung 26'; Kwak Tae-hwi 89' | | Al Hammadi 72' |

| 19 November AFC fourth round, Group B | Saudi Arabia | 0–2 | South Korea | Riyadh, Saudi Arabia |
| | | | Lee Keun-ho 76'; Park Chu-young 90+2' |

=== EAFF Championship ===
| 17 February | China | 2–3 | South Korea | Chongqing, China |
| | Zhou Haibin 46'; Liu Jian 61' | | Park Chu-young 42', 63'; Kwak Tae-hwi 90+1' |

| 20 February | South Korea | 1–1 | North Korea | Chongqing, China |
| | Yeom Ki-hun 20' | | Jong Tae-se 72' |

| 23 February | South Korea | 1–1 | Japan | Chongqing, China |
| | Yeom Ki-hun 15' | | Yamase 67' |

| Pos | Team | Pld | W | D | L | GF | GA | GD | Pts |
|---|---|---|---|---|---|---|---|---|---|
| 1 | South Korea (C) | 3 | 1 | 2 | 0 | 5 | 4 | +1 | 5 |
| 2 | Japan | 3 | 1 | 2 | 0 | 3 | 2 | +1 | 5 |
| 3 | China (H) | 3 | 1 | 0 | 2 | 5 | 5 | +0 | 3 |
| 4 | North Korea | 3 | 0 | 2 | 1 | 3 | 5 | –2 | 2 |

=== Summer Olympics ===
| 7 August Group D | South Korea | 1–1 | Cameroon | Qinhuangdao, China |
| 19:45 CST (UTC+08) | Park Chu-young 68' | Report | Mandjeck 81' | Stadium: Qinhuangdao Olympic Sports Center Stadium; Attendance: 21,943; Referee: Jair Marrufo (United States) |

| 10 August Group D | Italy | 3–0 | South Korea | Qinhuangdao, China |
| 19:45 CST (UTC+08) | Rossi 15'; Rocchi 32'; Montolivo 90' | Report | | Stadium: Qinhuangdao Olympic Sports Center Stadium; Attendance: 29,455; Referee: Thomas Einwaller (Austria) |

| 13 August Group D | South Korea | 1–0 | Honduras | Shanghai, China |
| 17:00 CST (UTC+08) | Kim Dong-jin 23' | Report | | Stadium: Shanghai Stadium; Attendance: 34,160; Referee: Michael Hester (New Zealand) |

Group D table
| Pos | Team | Pld | W | D | L | GF | GA | GD | Pts | Qualification |
|---|---|---|---|---|---|---|---|---|---|---|
| 1 | Italy | 3 | 2 | 1 | 0 | 6 | 0 | +6 | 7 | Advance to knockout stage |
| 2 | Cameroon | 3 | 1 | 2 | 0 | 2 | 1 | +1 | 5 | Advance to knockout stage |
| 3 | South Korea | 3 | 1 | 1 | 1 | 2 | 4 | −2 | 4 | |
| 4 | Honduras | 3 | 0 | 0 | 3 | 0 | 5 | −5 | 0 | |

Source: RSSSF

=== Friendlies ===
==== Senior team ====
| 30 January | South Korea | 0–1 | Chile | Seoul, South Korea |
| | | | Fierro 54' |

| 5 September | South Korea | 1–0 | Jordan | Seoul, South Korea |
| | Lee Chung-yong 5' |

| 11 October | South Korea | 3–0 | Uzbekistan | Suwon, South Korea |
| | Ki Sung-yueng 3'; Lee Keun-ho 72', 85' |

| 14 November | Qatar | 1–1 | South Korea | Doha, Qatar |
| | Fábio 73' | | Lee Chung-yong 6' |

==== Under-23 team ====
| 16 July | South Korea | 2–1 | Guatemala | Ansan, South Korea |
| 20:00 KST (UTC+09) | Kim Kun-hoan 56'; Lee Keun-ho 81' | | Ávila 32' | Stadium: Ansan Wa~ Stadium, Ansan; Attendance: 19,388; Referee: Liu Kwok Man (Hong Kong) |

| 27 July | South Korea | 2–1 | Ivory Coast | Suwon, South Korea |
| 20:00 KST (UTC+09) | Jung Sung-ryong 20'; Lee Keun-ho 62' | | Gervinho 74' | Stadium: Suwon World Cup Stadium; Attendance: 31,266; Referee: Huang Junjie (China PR) |

| 31 July | South Korea | 1–0 | Australia | Seoul, South Korea |
| 20:00 KST (UTC+09) | Shin Young-rok 24' | | | Stadium: Seoul World Cup Stadium; Attendance: 20,533; Referee: Kenji Ogiya (Japan) |

== Leagues ==
=== K League ===
==== Regular season ====
| Pos | Team | Pld | W | D | L | GF | GA | GD | Pts | Qualification |
|---|---|---|---|---|---|---|---|---|---|---|
| 1 | Suwon Samsung Bluewings | 26 | 17 | 3 | 6 | 46 | 24 | +22 | 54 | Qualification for playoffs final |
| 2 | FC Seoul | 26 | 15 | 9 | 2 | 44 | 25 | +19 | 54 | Qualification for playoffs semi-final |
| 3 | Seongnam Ilhwa Chunma | 26 | 15 | 6 | 5 | 45 | 21 | +24 | 51 | Qualification for playoffs first round |
| 4 | Ulsan Hyundai | 26 | 14 | 7 | 5 | 39 | 26 | +13 | 49 | Qualification for playoffs first round |
| 5 | Pohang Steelers | 26 | 13 | 5 | 8 | 43 | 34 | +9 | 44 | Qualification for playoffs first round |
| 6 | Jeonbuk Hyundai Motors | 26 | 11 | 4 | 11 | 39 | 37 | +2 | 37 | Qualification for playoffs first round |
| 7 | Incheon United | 26 | 9 | 9 | 8 | 29 | 30 | −1 | 36 | |
| 8 | Gyeongnam FC | 26 | 10 | 5 | 11 | 35 | 39 | −4 | 35 | |
| 9 | Jeonnam Dragons | 26 | 8 | 5 | 13 | 26 | 40 | −14 | 29 | |
| 10 | Jeju United | 26 | 7 | 7 | 12 | 23 | 31 | −8 | 28 | |
| 11 | Daegu FC | 26 | 8 | 2 | 16 | 46 | 58 | −12 | 26 | |
| 12 | Busan IPark | 26 | 5 | 7 | 14 | 30 | 39 | −9 | 22 | |
| 13 | Daejeon Citizen | 26 | 3 | 12 | 11 | 18 | 35 | −17 | 21 | |
| 14 | Gwangju Sangmu | 26 | 3 | 7 | 16 | 22 | 46 | −24 | 16 | |

Source: RSSSF (in English), K League (in Korean)
Rules for classification: 1) Points; 2) Goal difference; 3) Goals scored

==== Championship playoffs ====
First round
3 | Seongnam Ilhwa Chunma | 1
6 | Jeonbuk Hyundai Motors (a.e.t.) | 2
4 | Ulsan Hyundai (p) | 0 (4)
5 | Pohang Steelers | 0 (2)

Second round
Ulsan Hyundai | 1
Jeonbuk Hyundai Motors | 0

Semifinal
2 | FC Seoul (a.e.t.) | 4
Ulsan Hyundai | 2

Final
1 | Suwon Samsung Bluewings | 1 | 2 | 3
FC Seoul | 1 | 1 | 2

==== Final table ====
| Pos | Team | Qualification |
|---|---|---|
| 1 | Suwon Samsung Bluewings (C) | Qualification for Champions League |
| 2 | FC Seoul | Qualification for Champions League |
| 3 | Ulsan Hyundai | Qualification for Champions League |
| 4 | Jeonbuk Hyundai Motors | |
| 5 | Seongnam Ilhwa Chunma | |
| 6 | Pohang Steelers | Qualification for Champions League (Note: Qualified as champions of FA Cup.) |

Source: RSSSF
(C) Champions

=== Korea National League ===
==== Regular season ====
| Pos | Team | Pld | W | D | L | GF | GA | GD | Pts | Qualification |
|---|---|---|---|---|---|---|---|---|---|---|
| 1 | Hyundai Mipo Dockyard (C) | 26 | 18 | 5 | 3 | 69 | 33 | +36 | 59 | First stage winners |
| 2 | Suwon City | 26 | 18 | 4 | 4 | 54 | 26 | +28 | 58 | Second stage winners |
| 3 | Gangneung City FC | 26 | 14 | 7 | 5 | 42 | 29 | +13 | 49 | Qualification for playoffs |
| 4 | Busan Transportation Corporation | 26 | 13 | 5 | 8 | 49 | 37 | +12 | 44 | Qualification for playoffs |
| 5 | Gimhae City | 26 | 14 | 2 | 10 | 41 | 36 | +5 | 44 | |
| 6 | Goyang KB Kookmin Bank | 26 | 11 | 7 | 8 | 35 | 26 | +9 | 40 | |
| 7 | Ansan Hallelujah | 26 | 11 | 6 | 9 | 40 | 36 | +4 | 39 | |
| 8 | Daejeon KHNP | 26 | 10 | 6 | 10 | 34 | 30 | +4 | 36 | |
| 9 | Changwon City | 26 | 9 | 7 | 10 | 39 | 34 | +5 | 34 | |
| 10 | Cheonan City | 26 | 8 | 8 | 10 | 40 | 42 | −2 | 32 | |
| 11 | Nowon Hummel Korea | 26 | 5 | 11 | 10 | 29 | 39 | −10 | 26 | |
| 12 | Incheon Korail | 26 | 5 | 6 | 15 | 25 | 45 | −20 | 21 | |
| 13 | Yesan FC | 26 | 1 | 8 | 17 | 24 | 58 | −34 | 11 | |
| 14 | Hongcheon Idu | 26 | 2 | 4 | 20 | 35 | 85 | −50 | 10 | |

Source: RSSSF
(C) Champions

==== Championship playoffs ====
Semi-finals
Hyundai Mipo Dockyard | 3
Gangneung City | 0
Suwon City | 2
Busan Transportation Corporation | 0

Final
Hyundai Mipo Dockyard (p) | 1 | 1 | 2 (5)
Suwon City | 1 | 1 | 2 (4)

=== K3 League ===
==== Regular season ====
| Pos | Team | Pld | W | D | L | GF | GA | GD | Pts | Qualification |
|---|---|---|---|---|---|---|---|---|---|---|
| 1 | Yongin FC | 29 | 19 | 7 | 3 | 73 | 34 | +39 | 64 | Second stage winners |
| 2 | Hwaseong Shinwoo Electronics | 29 | 18 | 7 | 4 | 68 | 33 | +35 | 61 | First stage winners |
| 3 | Gwangju Gwangsan | 29 | 18 | 3 | 8 | 69 | 36 | +33 | 57 | Qualification for playoffs and FA Cup |
| 4 | Yangju FC (C) | 29 | 17 | 6 | 6 | 62 | 42 | +20 | 57 | Qualification for playoffs and FA Cup |
| 5 | Seoul United | 29 | 14 | 6 | 9 | 63 | 47 | +16 | 48 | Qualification for FA Cup |
| 6 | Namyangju Citizen | 29 | 13 | 7 | 9 | 65 | 51 | +14 | 46 | |
| 7 | Cheonan FC | 29 | 13 | 7 | 9 | 58 | 54 | +4 | 46 | |
| 8 | Jeonju Ongoeul (Note: Jeonju Ongoeul have 6 points deducted.) | 29 | 15 | 6 | 8 | 72 | 41 | +31 | 45 | |
| 9 | Asan United FC | 29 | 13 | 3 | 13 | 63 | 72 | −9 | 42 | |
| 10 | Jeonju EM | 29 | 11 | 6 | 12 | 54 | 50 | +4 | 39 | |
| 11 | Gyeongju Citizen | 29 | 9 | 3 | 17 | 52 | 65 | −13 | 30 | |
| 12 | Seoul Pabal | 29 | 8 | 5 | 16 | 60 | 73 | −13 | 29 | |
| 13 | Bucheon FC 1995 | 29 | 7 | 7 | 15 | 40 | 53 | −13 | 28 | |
| 14 | Pocheon FC | 29 | 6 | 3 | 20 | 43 | 80 | −37 | 21 | |
| 15 | Goyang FC | 29 | 2 | 4 | 23 | 42 | 120 | −78 | 10 | |
| 16 | Changwon United | 15 | 1 | 2 | 12 | 23 | 56 | −33 | 5 | |

Source: JoinKFA Soccerway
(C) Champions

==== Championship playoffs ====
Semi-finals
Yongin FC | 3 (4)
Yangju FC (p) | 3 (5)
Hwaseong Shinwoo Electronics | 1
Gwangju Gwangsan FC | 0

Final
Yangju FC (a) | 0 | 2 | 2
Hwaseong Shinwoo Electronics | 0 | 2 | 2

== Domestic cups ==
=== Korean FA Cup ===
Round of 16
Gyeongnam FC | 1
Yonsei University | 0
Suwon Samsung Bluewings | 1 (4)
Gwangju Sangmu (p) | 1 (5)
Goyang KB Kookmin Bank | 2
Honam University | 1
Changwon City | 0
Jeonbuk Hyundai Motors | 3
Ansan Hallelujah | 1
Daegu FC | 3
Ulsan Hyundai | 2
Busan IPark | 1
Seongnam Ilhwa Chunma (p) | 0 (5)
Hyundai Mipo Dockyard | 0 (4)
Jeonnam Dragons | 0
Pohang Steelers | 1

Quarter-finals
Gyeongnam FC | 1
Gwangju Sangmu | 0
Goyang KB Kookmin Bank (p) | 1 (3)
Jeonbuk Hyundai Motors | 1 (2)
Daegu FC | 2
Ulsan Hyundai | 1
Seongnam Ilhwa Chunma | 1 (7)
Pohang Steelers (p) | 1 (8)

Semi-finals
Gyeongnam FC | 5
Goyang KB Kookmin Bank | 0
Daegu FC | 0
Pohang Steelers | 2

Final
Gyeongnam FC | 0
Pohang Steelers | 2

=== Korean League Cup ===
==== Group stage ====
Group A
| Pos | Team | Pld | Pts |
|---|---|---|---|
| 1 | Suwon Samsung Bluewings | 10 | 21 |
| 2 | Busan IPark | 10 | 16 |
| 3 | FC Seoul | 10 | 14 |
| 4 | Gyeongnam FC | 10 | 13 |
| 5 | Jeju United | 10 | 9 |
| 6 | Incheon United | 10 | 9 |

Source: RSSSF

Group B
| Pos | Team | Pld | Pts |
|---|---|---|---|
| 1 | Jeonbuk Hyundai Motors | 10 | 19 |
| 2 | Seongnam Ilhwa Chunma | 10 | 19 |
| 3 | Ulsan Hyundai | 10 | 16 |
| 4 | Daejeon Citizen | 10 | 14 |
| 5 | Daegu FC | 10 | 11 |
| 6 | Gwangju Sangmu | 10 | 3 |

Source: RSSSF

==== Knockout stage ====
Quarter-finals
L | Pohang Steelers | 1
B2 | Seongnam Ilhwa Chunma | 0
FA | Jeonnam Dragons | 3
A2 | Busan IPark | 2

Semi-finals
A1 | Suwon Samsung Bluewings (p) | 0 (3)
Pohang Steelers | 0 (2)
B1 | Jeonbuk Hyundai Motors | 1
Jeonnam Dragons | 3

Final
Suwon Samsung Bluewings | 2
Jeonnam Dragons | 0

=== Korea National League Championship ===
==== Group stage ====
Group A
| Pos | Team | Pld | Pts |
|---|---|---|---|
| 1 | Daejeon KHNP | 3 | 7 |
| 2 | Incheon Korail | 3 | 4 |
| 3 | Busan Transportation Corporation | 3 | 3 |
| 4 | Suwon City | 3 | 3 |

Source: Report

Group B
| Pos | Team | Pld | Pts |
|---|---|---|---|
| 1 | Gangneung City | 3 | 5 |
| 2 | Changwon City | 3 | 5 |
| 3 | Hyundai Mipo Dockyard | 3 | 4 |
| 4 | Nowon Hummel Korea | 3 | 1 |

Source: Report

Group C
| Pos | Team | Pld | Pts |
|---|---|---|---|
| 1 | Gimhae City | 3 | 7 |
| 2 | Goyang Kookmin Bank | 3 | 7 |
| 3 | Yesan FC | 3 | 3 |
| 4 | Icheon Hyundai Autonet | 3 | 0 |

Source: Report

Group D
| Pos | Team | Pld | Pts |
|---|---|---|---|
| 1 | Ansan Hallelujah | 3 | 7 |
| 2 | Hongcheon Idu | 3 | 5 |
| 3 | Cheonan City | 3 | 4 |
| 4 | Gumi Siltron | 3 | 0 |

Source: Report

==== Knockout stage ====
Quarter-finals
Daejeon KHNP (p) | 2 (4)
Goyang KB Kookmin Bank | 2 (2)
Gangneung City | 5
Hongcheon Idu | 2
Gimhae City | 1
Incheon Korail | 2
Ansan Hallelujah | 2
Changwon City | 1

Semi-finals
Daejeon KHNP | 2
Gangneung City | 1
Incheon Korail | 1
Ansan Hallelujah | 2

Final
Daejeon KHNP (p) | 3 (3)
Ansan Hallelujah | 3 (0)

== International cups ==
=== AFC Champions League ===
| Team | Result | Round | Aggregate | Score | Venue | Opponent |
|---|---|---|---|---|---|---|
| Jeonnam Dragons | Group stage | Group G | Third place | 0–2 | Away | (Australia) Melbourne Victory |
| Jeonnam Dragons | Group stage | Group G | Third place | 1–1 | Home | (Australia) Melbourne Victory |
| Jeonnam Dragons | Group stage | Group G | Third place | 3–4 | Home | (Japan) Gamba Osaka |
| Jeonnam Dragons | Group stage | Group G | Third place | 1–1 | Away | (Japan) Gamba Osaka |
| Jeonnam Dragons | Group stage | Group G | Third place | 1–0 | Home | (Thailand) Chonburi |
| Jeonnam Dragons | Group stage | Group G | Third place | 2–2 | Away | (Thailand) Chonburi |
| Pohang Steelers | Group stage | Group E | Third place | 0–2 | Home | (Australia) Adelaide United |
| Pohang Steelers | Group stage | Group E | Third place | 0–1 | Away | (Australia) Adelaide United |
| Pohang Steelers | Group stage | Group E | Third place | 4–1 | Away | (Vietnam) Becamex Binh Duong |
| Pohang Steelers | Group stage | Group E | Third place | 0–0 | Home | (Vietnam) Becamex Binh Duong |
| Pohang Steelers | Group stage | Group E | Third place | 0–1 | Away | (China) Changchun Yatai |
| Pohang Steelers | Group stage | Group E | Third place | 2–2 | Home | (China) Changchun Yatai |

== See also ==
- Football in South Korea
