= 2015 Korean FA Cup =

2015 KEB Hana Bank FA Cup

Tournament details
- Country: South Korea
- Teams: 79

Final positions
- Champions: FC Seoul (2nd title)
- Runners-up: Incheon United

Tournament statistics
- Matches played: 78

Awards
- Best player: Yojiro Takahagi

The 2015 Korean FA Cup, known as the 2015 KEB Hana Bank FA Cup, was the 20th edition of the Korean FA Cup. FC Seoul became champions and qualified for the 2016 AFC Champions League.

== Schedule ==
| Round | Date | Matches | Clubs remaining | Clubs involved | New entries this round |
|---|---|---|---|---|---|
| First round | 28 March | 8 | 79 | 16 | 8 National Works Club Championship teams 4 university teams 4 K3 League teams |
| Second round | 4 April | 19 | 71 | 8+30 | 16 university teams 14 K3 League teams |
| Third round | 11–12 April | 20 | 52 | 19+21 | 11 K League Challenge teams 10 Korea National League teams |
| Round of 32 | 29 April – 13 May | 16 | 32 | 20+12 | 12 K League Classic teams |
| Round of 16 | 24 June | 8 | 16 | 16 | None |
| Quarter-finals | 28 May | 4 | 8 | 8 | None |
| Semi-finals | 14 October | 2 | 4 | 4 | None |
| Final | 31 October | 1 | 2 | 2 | None |

== Prize money ==
| Round | Recipient clubs | Prize money per club |
|---|---|---|
| Base fee for non-professional teams | 56 | ₩1,000,000 |
| Second round | 8 | ₩2,000,000 |
| Third round | 19 | ₩3,000,000 |
| Round of 32 | 20 | ₩4,000,000 |
| Round of 16 | 16 | ₩5,000,000 |
| Quarter-finals | 8 | ₩6,000,000 |
| Semi-finals | 4 | ₩7,000,000 |
| Runners-up | 1 | ₩100,000,000 |
| Champions | 1 | ₩200,000,000 |

== Teams ==
| Entry round | Participating teams | | |
| Round of 32 | K League Classic All 12 teams of the 2015 season | | |
|---|---|---|---|
| Round of 32 | Busan IPark; Daejeon Citizen; Gwangju FC; Incheon United; Jeju United; Jeonbuk Hyundai Motors; Jeonnam Dragons; Pohang Steelers; Seongnam FC; FC Seoul; Suwon Samsung Bluewings; Ulsan Hyundai | | |
| Third round | K League Challenge All 11 teams of the 2015 season | Korea National League All 10 teams of the 2015 season | |
| Third round | Ansan Police; FC Anyang; Bucheon FC 1995; Chungju Hummel; Daegu FC; Gangwon FC; Goyang Hi FC; Gyeongnam FC; Sangju Sangmu; Seoul E-Land; Suwon FC | Busan Transportation Corporation; Changwon City; Cheonan City; Daejeon Korail; Gangneung City; Gimhae City; Gyeongju KHNP; Mokpo City; Hyundai Mipo Dockyard; Yongin City | |
| Second round | University teams 16 teams | K3 League Top 14 teams of the 2014 season | |
| Second round | Catholic Kwandong University; Chung-Ang University; Dankook University; Hannam University; Hanyang University; Hongik University; Inje University; Korea University; Kwangwoon University; Kyung Hee University; Sangji University; Soongsil University; Sungkyunkwan University; Sun Moon University; University of Ulsan; Yeungnam University | Chuncheon FC; Chungbuk Cheongju; Gyeongju Citizen; Hwaseong FC; Icheon Citizen; Jeonju Citizen; Jeonnam Yeonggwang; Jungnang Chorus Mustang; Paju Citizen; FC Pocheon; Pyeongchang FC; Seoul United; Yangju Citizen; FC Uijeongbu | |
| First round | National Works Club Championship Top 8 teams of the 2014 season | University teams 4 teams | K3 League Bottom 4 teams of the 2014 season |
| First round | Denso Korea Automotive; LG Electronics; Mokpo Christian Hospital; Nexen Tire; Samsung Electronics; Shinan Salt Korea; SK Hynix; SMC Engineering | Dong-Eui University; Gwangju University; Incheon National University; Woosuk University | Cheonan FC; Gimpo Citizen; Goyang Citizen; Seoul FC Martyrs |

== Qualifying rounds ==
The draw for the qualifying rounds was held on 27 February 2015.

=== First round ===
The first round was held on 28 March 2015.

| 28 March 2015 | Goyang Citizen | 2–0 | Mokpo Christian Hospital | Goyang Eoulimnuri ground, Goyang |
| 14:00 UTC+09:00 | | | | Referee: Kim Hong-nam |

| 28 March 2015 | Gimpo Citizen | 3–1 | LG Electronics | Gimpo City Stadium, Gimpo |
| 14:00 UTC+09:00 | | | | Referee: Yoo Myeong-bok |

| 28 March 2015 | Incheon National University | 1–0 | Shinan Salt Korea | Incheon National University ground, Incheon |
| 14:00 UTC+09:00 | | | | Referee: Park Cheol-su |

| 28 March 2015 | Dong-Eui University | 1–0 | Samsung Electronics | Gimcheon Stadium, Gimcheon |
| 12:00 UTC+09:00 | | | | Referee: Kim Do-yeon |

| 28 March 2015 | SK Hynix | 4–3 | Seoul FC Martyrs | Icheon City Stadium, Icheon |
| 15:00 UTC+09:00 | | | | Referee: Choi Wol-myeong |

| 28 March 2015 | Cheonan FC | 1–2 | SMC Engineering | Cheonan Football Center, Cheonan |
| 14:00 UTC+09:00 | | | | Referee: Lee Seung-ho |

| 28 March 2015 | Nexen Tire | 1–1 (a.e.t.) (5–3 p) | Gwangju University | Gimcheon Stadium, Gimcheon |
| 15:00 UTC+09:00 | | | | Referee: Han Chang-hee |

| 28 March 2015 | Woosuk University | 1–0 | Denso Korea Automotive | Woosuk University ground, Wanju |
| 14:00 UTC+09:00 | | | | Referee: Cho Hyung-taek |

=== Second round ===
The second round was held on 4 April 2015.

| 4 April 2015 | Catholic Kwandong University | 1–2 | Nexen Tire | Gimcheon Stadium, Gimcheon |
| 12:00 UTC+09:00 |

| 4 April 2015 | Paju Citizen | 1–2 | Dankook University | Paju Public Stadium, Paju |
| 15:00 UTC+09:00 |

| 4 April 2015 | Sangji University | 3–0 | Seoul United | Sangji University ground, Wonju |
| 14:00 UTC+09:00 |

| 4 April 2015 | FC Pocheon | 2–3 | Hanyang University | Yeoncheon Stadium, Yeoncheon |
| 15:00 UTC+09:00 |

| 4 April 2015 | Hannam University | 1–0 | SMC Engineering | Hannam University ground, Daejeon |
| 14:00 UTC+09:00 |

| 4 April 2015 | Gimpo Citizen | 2–1 | Chuncheon FC | Gimpo City Stadium, Gimpo |
| UTC+09:00 |

| 4 April 2015 | Jeonju Citizen FC | 1–0 | Dong-Eui University | Jeonju University ground, Jeonju |
| 14:00 UTC+09:00 |

| 4 April 2015 | Inje University | 2–2 (a.e.t.) (4–5 p) | Sun Moon University | Gimcheon Stadium, Gimcheon |
| 15:00 UTC+09:00 |

| 4 April 2015 | Soongsil University | 1–0 | University of Ulsan | Soongsil University ground, Seoul |
| 14:00 UTC+09:00 |

| 4 April 2015 | Goyang Citizen | 0–4 | Woosuk University | Goyang Eoulimnuri ground, Goyang |
| UTC+09:00 |

| 4 April 2015 | Kwangwoon University | 3–1 | Incheon National University |
| UTC+09:00 |

| 4 April 2015 | FC Uijeongbu | 1–4 | Hongik University | Uijeongbu Stadium, Uijeongbu |
| 16:00 UTC+09:00 |

| 4 April 2015 | Sungkyunkwan University | 0–1 | Yeungnam University | Sungkyunkwan University ground, Seoul |
| 14:00 UTC+09:00 |

| 4 April 2015 | Hwaseong FC | 3–0 | Yangju Citizen | Hwaseong Sports Complex, Hwaseong |
| 14:00 UTC+09:00 |

| 4 April 2015 | Korea University | 6–1 | Jeonnam Yeonggwang | Korea University ground, Seoul |
| 14:00 UTC+09:00 |

| 4 April 2015 | Icheon Citizen | 1–0 | Pyeongchang FC | Icheon City Stadium, Icheon |
| 15:00 UTC+09:00 |

| 4 April 2015 | Kyung Hee University | 2–2 (a.e.t.) (4–3 p) | Chung-Ang University | Kyung Hee University ground, Seoul |
| 14:00 UTC+09:00 |

| 4 April 2015 | Jungnang Chorus Mustang | 6–0 | SK Hynix | Jungnang Public Ground, Seoul |
| 13:00 UTC+09:00 |

| 4 April 2015 | Chungbuk Cheongju | 1–0 | Gyeongju Citizen | Yongjeong Football Park, Cheongju |
| 15:00 UTC+09:00 |

=== Third round ===
The third round was held on 11 and 12 April 2015.

| 11 April 2015 | Jungnang Chorus Mustang | 0–0 (a.e.t.) (3–5 p) | Korea University | Jungnang Public Ground, Seoul |
| UTC+09:00 |

| 11 April 2015 | Ansan Police | 2–0 | Soongsil University | Ansan Wa~ Stadium, Ansan |
| 17:00 UTC+09:00 |

| 11 April 2015 | Yongin City | 5–0 | Nexen Tire | Yongin Football Center, Yongin |
| 14:00 UTC+09:00 |

| 11 April 2015 | Cheonan City | 1–1 (a.e.t.) (5–4 p) | Icheon Citizen | Cheonan Football Center, Cheonan |
| 15:00 UTC+09:00 |

| 11 April 2015 | Suwon FC | 1–2 | Hyundai Mipo Dockyard | Suwon Stadium, Suwon |
| 14:00 UTC+09:00 |

| 11 April 2015 | Daegu FC | 3–0 | Chungbuk Cheongju | Daegu Stadium, Daegu |
| 15:00 UTC+09:00 |

| 11 April 2015 | Sangji University | 1–1 (a.e.t.) (5–3 p) | Dankook University | Sangji University Ground, Wonju |
| UTC+09:00 |

| 11 April 2015 | Gangwon FC | 2–1 | Gyeongnam FC | Sokcho Stadium, Sokcho |
| 14:00 UTC+09:00 |

| 11 April 2015 | Daejeon Korail | 3–0 | Hannam University | Daejeon Hanbat Stadium, Daejeon |
| 15:00 UTC+09:00 |

| 11 April 2015 | FC Anyang | 2–0 | Woosuk University | Anyang Stadium, Anyang |
| 14:00 UTC+09:00 |

| 11 April 2015 | Gangneung City | 1–2 | Yeungnam University | Jeongseon Stadium, Jeongseon |
| 15:00 UTC+09:00 |

| 11 April 2015 | Chungju Hummel | 2–0 | Kyung Hee University | Chungju Stadium, Chungju |
| 14:00 UTC+09:00 |

| 11 April 2015 | Goyang Hi FC | 3–2 | University of Incheon | Goyang Stadium, Goyang |
| 14:00 UTC+09:00 |

| 11 April 2015 | Seoul E-Land | 2–0 | Sun Moon University | Seoul Olympic Stadium, Seoul |
| 12:00 UTC+09:00 |

| 11 April 2015 | Busan Transportation Corporation | 2–2 (a.e.t.) (7–6 p) | Hanyang University | Busan Gudeok Stadium, Busan |
| UTC+09:00 |

| 11 April 2015 | Bucheon FC 1995 | 1–0 | Gimhae City | Bucheon Stadium, Bucheon |
| 14:00 UTC+09:00 |

| 11 April 2015 | Changwon City | 2–0 | Jeonju Citizen | Changwon Football Center, Changwon |
| 15:00 UTC+09:00 |

| 11 April 2015 | Sangju Sangmu | 0–1 | Gyeongju KHNP | Sangju Civic Stadium, Sangju |
| 16:00 UTC+09:00 |

| 11 April 2015 | Hwaseong FC | 2–1 | Mokpo City | Hwaseong Sports Complex, Hwaseong |
| UTC+09:00 |

| 12 April 2015 | Gimpo Citizen | 2–2 (a.e.t.) (3–2 p) | Hongik University | Gimpo City Stadium |
| UTC+09:00 |

== Final rounds ==
=== Bracket ===
Round of 32
Suwon Samsung Bluewings | 3 (3)
Jeonnam Dragons (p) | 3 (4)
Ansan Police | 1 (3)
Chungju Hummel (p) | 1 (4)
Busan IPark | 2
Gangwon FC | 3
Hyundai Mipo Dockyard | 2
Gimpo Citizen | 0
Jeju United | 4
FC Anyang | 1
Daejeon Korail | 1
Yongin City | 0
Incheon United | 2
Bucheon FC 1995 | 0
Cheonan City | 4
Korea University | 1
Seongnam FC (a.e.t.) | 1
Busan Transportation Corporation | 0
Sangji University | 1
Yeungnam University | 2
Ulsan Hyundai (p) | 1 (6)
Seoul E-Land | 1 (5)
Gwangju FC | 0
Daejeon Citizen | 1
FC Seoul | 3
Gyeongju KHNP | 0
Changwon City | 1
Hwaseong FC | 2
Pohang Steelers | 3
Daegu FC | 1
Jeonbuk Hyundai Motors (a.e.t.) | 1
Goyang Hi FC | 0

Round of 16
Jeonnam Dragons | 4
Chungju Hummel | 1
Gangwon FC | 0
Hyundai Mipo Dockyard | 1
Jeju United | 2
Daejeon Korail | 1
Incheon United | 1
Cheonan City | 0
Seongnam FC (a.e.t.) | 2
Yeungnam University | 1
Ulsan Hyundai (a.e.t.) | 3
Daejeon Citizen | 2
FC Seoul | 2
Hwaseong FC | 1
Pohang Steelers | 2
Jeonbuk Hyundai Motors | 1

Quarter-finals
Jeonnam Dragons | 1
Hyundai Mipo Dockyard | 0
Jeju United | 0
Incheon United (a.e.t.) | 2
Seongnam FC | 1
Ulsan Hyundai (a.e.t.) | 2
FC Seoul | 2
Pohang Steelers | 1

Semi-finals
14 October – Incheon
Jeonnam Dragons | 0
Incheon United (a.e.t.) | 2
14 October – Seoul
Ulsan Hyundai | 1
FC Seoul | 2

Final
31 October – Seoul
Incheon United | 1
FC Seoul | 3

=== Round of 32 ===
The draw for the round of 32 was held on 16 April 2015. It was played on 29 April and 12–13 May 2015.

| 29 April 2015 | FC Seoul | 3–0 | Gyeongju KHNP | Seoul World Cup Stadium, Seoul |
| UTC+09:00 | Shim Je-hyeok 33'; Jung Jo-gook 84', 86' | Report | | Attendance: 1,570 |

| 29 April 2015 | Sangji University | 1–2 | Yeungnam University | Sangji University Ground, Wonju |
| UTC+09:00 | Cho Jae-wan 38' | Report | Lee Soon-min 23'; Jung Won-jin 40' | Attendance: 300 |

| 29 April 2015 | Incheon United | 2–0 | Bucheon FC 1995 | Incheon Football Stadium, Incheon |
| UTC+09:00 | Oris 4'; Kim Jin-hwan 54' | Report | | Attendance: 848 |

| 29 April 2015 | Daegu FC | 1–3 | Pohang Steelers | Daegu Stadium, Daegu |
| UTC+09:00 | Lee Won-jae 4' | Report | Moon Chang-jin 55'; Shim Dong-woon 63'; Moritz 90' | Attendance: 1,125 |

| 29 April 2015 | Ulsan Hyundai | 1–1 (a.e.t.) (6–5 p) | Seoul E-Land | Ulsan World Cup Stadium, Ulsan |
| UTC+09:00 | Yang Dong-hyun 52' | Report | Joo Min-kyu 64' | Attendance: 705 |

| 29 April 2015 | Busan IPark | 2–3 | Gangwon FC | Busan Asiad Stadium, Busan |
| UTC+09:00 | Noh Haeng-seok 50'; Weslley 57' | Report | Choi Seung-in 20', 32'; Shin Young-jun 35' | Attendance: 450 |

| 29 April 2015 | Daejeon Korail | 1–0 | Yongin City | Daejeon Hanbat Sports Complex, Daejeon |
| UTC+09:00 | Cho Hyung-ik 5' | Report | | Attendance: 115 |

| 29 April 2015 | Goyang Hi FC | 0–1 (a.e.t.) | Jeonbuk Hyundai Motors | Goyang Sports Complex, Goyang |
| UTC+09:00 | | Report | Edu 97' | Attendance: 457 |

| 29 April 2015 | Ansan Police | 1–1 (a.e.t.) (3–4 p) | Chungju Hummel | Ansan Wa~ Stadium, Ansan |
| UTC+09:00 | Seo Dong-hyeon 65' | Report | Marcinho 86' | Attendance: 203 |

| 29 April 2015 | Daejeon Citizen | 1–0 | Gwangju FC | Daejeon World Cup Stadium, Daejeon |
| UTC+09:00 | Kim Young-seung 65' | Report | | Attendance: 490 |

| 29 April 2015 | Cheonan City | 4–1 | Korea University | Cheonan Football Center, Cheonan |
| UTC+09:00 | Kim Sung-min 14'; Cho Irok 34', 68'; In Joon-yeon 81' | Report | Jang Seong-jae 21' | Attendance: 400 |

| 29 April 2015 | Busan Transportation Corporation | 0–1 (a.e.t.) | Seongnam FC | Busan Gudeok Stadium, Busan |
| UTC+09:00 | | Report | Hwang Ui-jo 83' | Attendance: 250 |

| 29 April 2015 | Jeju United | 4–1 | FC Anyang | Jeju World Cup Stadium, Jeju |
| UTC+09:00 | Yoon Bit-garam 25'; Kim Hyun 39', 51'; In Joon-yeon 69' | Report | Lee Dong-hyun 36' | Attendance: 612 |

| 12 May 2015 | Hwaseong FC | 2–1 | Changwon City | Hwaseong Stadium, Hwaseong |
| UTC+09:00 | Park Sung-jin 30'; Kim Hyung-pil 39' | Report | Kwak Chul-ho 25' |

| 13 May 2015 | Hyundai Mipo Dockyard | 2–0 | Gimpo Citizen | Ulsan Stadium, Ulsan |
| UTC+09:00 | Kwak Sung-chan 27'; Han Keon-young 86' | Report | | Attendance: 310 |

| 13 May 2015 | Suwon Samsung Bluewings | 3–3 (a.e.t.) (3–4 p) | Jeonnam Dragons | Suwon World Cup Stadium, Suwon |
| UTC+09:00 | Jong Tae-se 27', 59'; Lee Sang-ho 101' | Report | Oršić 62'; Ahn Yong-woo 87'; Lim Jong-eun 107' |

=== Round of 16 ===
The draw for the round of 16 was held on 28 May 2015. The matches were played on 24 June 2015.

| 24 June 2015 | Daejeon Korail | 1–2 | Jeju United | Daejeon Hanbat Sports Complex, Daejeon |
| 19:00 UTC+09:00 | Yoon Jung-min 43' | Report | Kim Hyun 45'; Song Jin-hyung 68' | Attendance: 450 |

| 24 June 2015 | Seongnam FC | 2–1 (a.e.t.) | Yeungnam University | Tancheon Sports Complex, Seongnam |
| 19:30 UTC+09:00 | Son Min-jae 38' (o.g.); Hwang Ui-jo 92' | Report | Joo Han-seong 60' | Attendance: 1,305 |

| 24 June 2015 | Chungju Hummel | 1–4 | Jeonnam Dragons | Chungju Stadium, Chungju |
| 19:00 UTC+09:00 | Noh Hyung-goo 60' | | Jeon Hyeon-chul 17', 74'; Ahn Yong-woo 22'; Lee Jong-ho 45' | Attendance: 1,253 |

| 24 June 2015 | Cheonan City | 0–1 | Incheon United | Cheonan Football Center, Cheonan |
| 19:00 UTC+09:00 | | Report | Kim Jin-hwan 60' | Attendance: 1,300 |

| 24 June 2015 | Gangwon FC | 0–1 | Hyundai Mipo Dockyard | Sokcho Stadium, Sokcho |
| 19:00 UTC+09:00 | | Report | Park Han-soo 79' | Attendance: 353 |

| 24 June 2015 | Hwaseong FC | 1–2 | FC Seoul | Hwaseong Stadium, Hwaseong |
| 19:00 UTC+09:00 | Kim Nam-chun 71' (o.g.) | Report | Éverton Santos 45'; Yun Ju-tae 90' | Attendance: 5,832 |

| 24 June 2015 | Pohang Steelers | 2–1 | Jeonbuk Hyundai Motors | Pohang Steel Yard, Pohang |
| 19:30 UTC+09:00 | Shim Dong-woon 22'; Park Sung-ho 85' | Report | Lee Dong-gook 90' | Attendance: 5,722 |

| 24 June 2015 | Ulsan Hyundai | 3–2 (a.e.t.) | Daejeon Citizen | Ulsan Munsu Football Stadium, Ulsan |
| 19:30 UTC+09:00 | Yoo Jun-soo 44'; Kim Shin-wook 96', 106' | Report | Adriano 70'; Hwang Ji-woong 98' | Attendance: 1,012 |

=== Quarter-finals ===
The draw for the quarter-finals was held on 28 May 2015. The matches were played on 22 July 2015.

| 22 July 2015 | Jeonnam Dragons | 1–0 | Hyundai Mipo Dockyard | Gwangyang Football Stadium, Gwangyang |
| 19:00 UTC+09:00 | Lee Jong-ho 44' | Report | | Attendance: 1,340 |

| 22 July 2015 | Seongnam FC | 1–2 (a.e.t.) | Ulsan Hyundai | Tancheon Sports Complex, Seongnam |
| 19:30 UTC+09:00 | Hwang Ui-jo 34' | Report | Kim Tae-hwan 25'; Kovačec 94' | Attendance: 5,441 |

| 22 July 2015 | FC Seoul | 2–1 | Pohang Steelers | Seoul World Cup Stadium, Seoul |
| 19:30 UTC+09:00 | Park Chu-young 25', 68' | Report | Kim Dae-ho 22' | Attendance: 6,267 |

| 22 July 2015 | Jeju United | 0–2 (a.e.t.) | Incheon United | Jeju World Cup Stadium, Jeju |
| 20:00 UTC+09:00 | | Report | Kwon Wan-kyu 91'; Kim Do-hyuk 107' | Attendance: 917 |

=== Semi-finals ===
The draw for the semi-finals was held on 24 September 2015. The matches were played on 14 October 2015.

| 14 October 2015 | Incheon United | 2–0 (a.e.t.) | Jeonnam Dragons | Incheon Football Stadium, Incheon |
| 19:30 UTC+09:00 | Yun Sang-ho 91'; Oris 115' | Report | | Attendance: 4,007 |

| 14 October 2015 | Ulsan Hyundai | 1–2 | FC Seoul | Ulsan Munsu Football Stadium, Ulsan |
| 19:30 UTC+09:00 | Kovačec 68' | Report | Takahagi 38'; Adriano 54' | Attendance: 7,474 |

=== Final ===
| 31 October 2015 | FC Seoul | 3–1 | Incheon United | Seoul World Cup Stadium, Seoul |
| 13:30 UTC+09:00 | Takahagi 33'; Adriano 88'; Molina 90+1' | Report | Lee Hyo-kyun 72' | Attendance: 26,797; Referee: Ko Hyung Jin |

== Awards ==
=== Main awards ===
| Award | Winner | Team |
|---|---|---|
| Most Valuable Player | (Japan) Yojiro Takahagi | FC Seoul |
| Top goalscorer | Not awarded | |

=== Man of the Round ===
| Round | Winner | Team |
|---|---|---|
| First round | (South Korea) Kim Tae-min | Nexen Tire |
| Second round | (South Korea) Lee Dong-hui | Hanyang University |
| Third round | (South Korea) Kim Hyung-pil | Hwaseong FC |
| Round of 32 | (South Korea) Jung Min-kyo | Hwaseong FC |
| Round of 16 | (South Korea) Kim Shin-wook | Ulsan Hyundai |
| Quarter-finals | (South Korea) Park Chu-young | FC Seoul |
| Semi-finals | (Japan) Yojiro Takahagi | FC Seoul |

== See also ==
- 2015 in South Korean football
- 2015 K League Classic
- 2015 K League Challenge
- 2015 Korea National League
- 2015 K3 League
