= K3 League (2007–2019) =

South Korean association football league

- Organising body: Korea Football Association
- Founded: 2007; 19 years ago
- First season: 2007
- Folded: 2019
- Country: South Korea
- Divisions: K3 League Advanced; K3 League Basic
- Level on pyramid: 3 (2007–2012); 4 (2013–2016); 4–5 (2017–2019)
- Domestic cup: Korean FA Cup
- League cup: Challengers Cup
- Most championships: Pocheon Citizen (6 titles)

The K3 League (Korean: K3리그) was a South Korean amateur football league held annually from 2007 to 2019. It was considered the third-highest division of the South Korean football league system before the K League 2 was launched in 2013, and the fourth-highest division since then. In 2017, it was divided into K3 League Advanced and fifth-tier league K3 League Basic, and introduced a system of promotion and relegation. In 2020, it was reborn as a semi-professional league after merging with the Korea National League.

== History ==
The K3 League had an exhibition season held in two stages with ten teams in 2007. The winners of both stages and the best two clubs in the overall standings qualified for the championship playoffs and the 2008 Korean FA Cup. Seoul United became inaugural champions after winning the championship playoffs.

After the league was officially launched in 2008, the number of participating clubs increased to 18 until the 2010 season, while new clubs registered in the league and some of the existing clubs were dissolved due to financial problems. Seoul Pabal, which engaged in a match-fixing scandal during the 2008 season, was also dissolved at that time.

It was renamed the Challengers League in 2011 and the K3 Challengers League in 2014, but reverted to its original name again in 2015 after being criticised for being confused with a youth league of K League clubs (which had the same name) and the K League Challenge.

In 2017, it introduced a system of promotion and relegation, and was divided into the first division K3 League Advanced and the second division the K3 League Basic.

After the 2019 season, amateur level K3 League was revamped as a semi-professional league with the same name. The Korea National League and the K3 League Advanced were absorbed into the third division and were rebranded as the new K3 League.

== Competition format ==
=== Regular season ===
- 2007–2008: After the regular season was operated in two stages, the winners of both stages and the best two clubs in the overall standings qualified for the championship playoffs.
- 2009: All clubs played home and away season, and the championship playoffs were not held.
- 2010–2012: The participating clubs were divided into two groups, and the winners and runners-up of both groups qualified for the championship playoffs. All clubs had interleague play once after playing home and away season in each group.
- 2013–2015: The third-placed clubs of both groups also qualified for the championship playoffs.
- 2016–2019: All clubs played in a single league without groups, and the top five clubs qualified for the championship playoffs.

=== Championship playoffs ===
- 2007–2011: All four clubs entered in the semi-finals.
- 2012: On the basis of the overall standings, third and fourth-placed club entered the first round, and first-placed club directly advanced to the final (third round).
- 2013–2015: On the basis of the overall standings, first and second-placed club directly advanced to the final and semi-final respectively, and the other four clubs entered the first round.
- 2016–2019: The winners of the regular season directly advanced to the final, and the other four clubs entered the first round.

== All-time clubs ==
- Jeonju Citizen (2007–2019)
- Seoul Nowon United (2007–2019)
- Yangju Citizen (2007–2019)
- Cheonan FC (2007–2015)
- Asan United (2007–2013)
- Goyang Citizen (2008–2019)
- Gyeongju Citizen (2008–2019)
- Pocheon Citizen (2008–2019)
- Pyeongchang FC (2008–2019)
- Icheon Citizen (2009–2019)
- Cheongju FC (2009–2019)
- Seoul FC Martyrs (2009–2015)
- Chuncheon FC (2010–2019)
- Yeonggwang FC (2010–2016)
- Paju Citizen (2012–2019)
- Seoul Jungnang (2012–2019)
- Gimpo Citizen FC (2013–2019)
- Hwaseong FC (2013–2019)
- Samcheok Shinwoo Electronics (2007–2010)
- Yongin Citizen (2007–2010)
- Changwon United (2007–2008)
- Seoul Pabal (2007–2008)
- Daegu Korea Powertrain (2007)
- Bucheon FC 1995 (2008–2012)
- Namyangju United (2008–2012)
- Jeonju Ongoeul (2008–2009)
- FC Uijeongbu (2014–2018)
- Siheung City (2016–2019)
- Yangpyeong FC (2016–2019)
- Buyeo FC (2016–2018)
- Cheongju City (2016–2018)
- Chungju Citizen (2017–2019)
- Pyeongtaek Citizen (2017–2019)
- Yeoju Citizen (2017–2019)
- Busan FC (2017–2018)
- Ulsan Citizen (2018–2019)

== Champions ==
=== Champions by season ===
Season	Champions	Runners-up
2007	Seoul United	Hwasung Shinwoo Electronics
2008	Yangju Citizen	Hwasung Shinwoo Electronics
2009	Pocheon Citizen	Gwangju Gwangsan
2010	Gyeongju Citizen	Hwasung Shinwoo Electronics
2011	Gyeongju Citizen	Yangju Citizen
2012	Pocheon Citizen	Chuncheon FC
2013	Pocheon Citizen	Paju Citizen
2014	Hwaseong FC	Pocheon Citizen
2015	Pocheon Citizen	Gyeongju Citizen
2016	Pocheon Citizen	Cheongju City
2017	Pocheon Citizen	Cheongju City
2018	Gyeongju Citizen	Icheon Citizen
2019	Hwaseong FC	Yangpyeong FC

=== Performance by club ===
Club	Champions	Runners-up
Pocheon Citizen	5 (2009, 2012, 2013, 2015, 2016)	1 (2014)
Gyeongju Citizen	3 (2010, 2011, 2017)	1 (2015)
Hwaseong FC	2 (2014, 2019)	—
Yangju Citizen	1 (2008)	1 (2011)
Seoul United	1 (2007)	—
Hwasung Shinwoo Electronics	—	3 (2007, 2008, 2010)
Gwangju Gwangsan	—	1 (2009)
Chuncheon FC	—	1 (2012)
Paju Citizen	—	1 (2013)
Yangpyeong FC	—	1 (2019)
Cheongju City	—	2 (2016, 2017)

=== Champions by season (Basic) ===
Season	Champions	Runners-up
2017	Seoul Jungnang	Siheung Citizen
2018	Siheung Citizen	Paju Citizen
2019	Ulsan Citizen	Jeonju Citizen

== See also ==
- K3 League
- K4 League
- Challengers Cup
- South Korean football league system
