= 2017 Korean FA Cup =

2017 KEB Hana Bank FA Cup

Tournament details
- Country: South Korea
- Teams: 86

Final positions
- Champions: Ulsan Hyundai (1st title)
- Runners-up: Busan IPark

Awards
- Best player: Kim Yong-dae

The 2017 Korean FA Cup, known as the 2017 KEB Hana Bank FA Cup, was the 22nd edition of the Korean FA Cup. The champions Ulsan Hyundai qualified for the group stage of the 2018 AFC Champions League. This edition introduced video assistant referee (VAR) system for the first time in Korean FA Cup history, using in the semi-finals and the final.

== Qualifying rounds ==
=== First round ===
11 March 2017	Hongik University	5–1	Nexen Tire
12:00 (UTC+9)

11 March 2017	Cheongju University	5–0	Jeju City	Cheongju University Football Stadium
14:00 (UTC+9)

11 March 2017	Jesus Hospital	3–2 (a.e.t.)	Kyungshin Cable
14:00 (UTC+9)

11 March 2017	FC Uijeongbu	2–5	Jungnang Chorus Mustang	Uijeongbu Stadium, Uijeongbu
14:00 (UTC+9)

11 March 2017	Pukyong National University	3–0	SK Hynix
14:00 (UTC+9)

11 March 2017	Honam University	1–0	Buyeo FC
14:00 (UTC+9)

11 March 2017	Ajou University	2–1	Jeonju University
14:00 (UTC+9)

11 March 2017	Siheung City	0–1	Soongsil University
14:00 (UTC+9)

11 March 2017	Mokpo Christian Hospital	0–1	Chung-Ang University
14:00 (UTC+9)

11 March 2017	Hankook Tire	0–2	Incheon National University
14:00 (UTC+9)

11 March 2017	Pyeongchang FC	0–1	Hanyang University
14:00 (UTC+9)

11 March 2017	Seoul United	0–2	Pai Chai University	Hyochang Stadium, Seoul
15:00 (UTC+9)

11 March 2017	Busan FC	2–3	Gwangju University
15:00 (UTC+9)

11 March 2017	Yuhan Chemicals	3–2	Korea Fuji Xerox
15:00 (UTC+9)

11 March 2017	SMC Engineering	1–0	Dankook University
15:00 (UTC+9)

11 March 2017	Goyang Citizen	2–3	Catholic Kwandong University
17:00 (UTC+9)

12 March 2017	Pyeongtake City	5–2	Sejong Industrial
14:00 (UTC+9)

=== Second round ===
18 March 2017	Cheongju University	0–0 (a.e.t.) (7–8 p)	Chung-Ang University
14:00 (UTC+9)

18 March 2017	Incheon National University	2–1	Kyonggi University
14:00 (UTC+9)

18 March 2017	Icheon Citizen	0–1	Paju Citizen
15:00 (UTC+9)

18 March 2017	Yeungnam University	1–1 (a.e.t.) (4–2 p)	Catholic Kwandong University
14:00 (UTC+9)

18 March 2017	Hongik University	2–0	Chosun University
12:00 (UTC+9)

18 March 2017	Jungnang Chorus Mustang	0–1	Hanyang University
13:00 (UTC+9)

18 March 2017	Korea University	5–0	Yuhan Chemicals
14:00 (UTC+9)

18 March 2017	Hwaseong FC	1–0	Dongguk University
14:00 (UTC+9)

18 March 2017	Pyeongtake City	0–1	Honam University
14:00 (UTC+9)

18 March 2017	University of Ulsan	0–3	Yonsei University
15:00 (UTC+9)

18 March 2017	Songho University	0–4	Ajou University
14:00 (UTC+9)

18 March 2017	Yangpyeong FC	2–2 (a.e.t.) (5–4 p)	SMC Engineering
14:00 (UTC+9)

18 March 2017	Soongsil University	2–2 (a.e.t.) (4–5 p)	Yong In University
14:00 (UTC+9)

18 March 2017	Sun Moon University	1–0	Gwangju University
14:00 (UTC+9)

18 March 2017	Chuncheon FC	2–0	Pai Chai University
14:00 (UTC+9)

19 March 2017	Cheongju FC	8–0	Jesus Hospital
14:00 (UTC+9)

19 March 2017	Gyeongju Citizen	2–0	Pukyong National University
14:00 (UTC+9)

=== Third round ===
29 March 2017	Gangneung City	0–0 (a.e.t.) (5–4 p)	Ansan Greeners
19:00 (UTC+9)

29 March 2017	Paju Citizen	2–2 (a.e.t.) (1–3 p)	Cheongju City
19:00 (UTC+9)

29 March 2017	Chuncheon FC	1–1 (a.e.t.) (4–2 p)	Korea University
15:00 (UTC+9)

29 March 2017	Seongnam FC	0–0 (a.e.t.) (5–4 p)	Suwon FC
19:00 (UTC+9)

29 March 2017	Cheonan City	1–2	Daejeon Citizen
19:00 (UTC+9)

29 March 2017	FC Anyang	1–0	Honam University
20:00 (UTC+9)

29 March 2017	Yonsei University	1–0	Yong In University
16:00 (UTC+9)

29 March 2017	Asan Mugunghwa	3–0	Hanyang University
19:00 (UTC+9)

29 March 2017	Yangpyeong FC	3–1	Cheongju FC
15:00 (UTC+9)

29 March 2017	Gyeongju Citizen	1–3	Ajou University
13:00 (UTC+9)

29 March 2017	Jeonju Citizen	5–2	Chung-Ang University
14:00 (UTC+9)

29 March 2017	Bucheon FC 1995	2–0	Incheon National University
19:30 (UTC+9)

29 March 2017	Hwaseong FC	0–1	Gyeongnam FC
19:30 (UTC+9)

29 March 2017	FC Pocheon	1–0	Seoul E-Land
15:00 (UTC+9)

29 March 2017	Daejeon Korail	1–0	Yangju Citizen
19:00 (UTC+9)

29 March 2017	Busan IPark	4–0	Gimpo Citizen
17:00 (UTC+9)

29 March 2017	Gyeongju KHNP	4–0	Sun Moon University
19:00 (UTC+9)

29 March 2017	Busan Transportation Corporation	0–1	Gimhae FC
19:00 (UTC+9)

29 March 2017	Mokpo City	2–0 (a.e.t.)	Changwon FC
14:00 (UTC+9)

29 March 2017	Yeungnam University	2–1 (a.e.t.)	Hongik University
14:00 (UTC+9)

== Final rounds ==
=== Bracket ===
Round of 32
Jeonbuk Hyundai Motors	0 (2)
Bucheon FC 1995 (p)	0 (4)
Sangju Sangmu	1
Gangneung City	0
Gyeongnam FC	2
Daegu FC	1
Ulsan Hyundai	3
Chuncheon FC	1
Gangwon FC	1
Daejeon Korail	0
Seongnam FC	3
Cheongju City	1
Gyeongju KHNP	0
FC Pocheon	2
Mokpo City	1
Yangpyeong FC	0
Daejeon Citizen	2
Yeungnam University	0
Jeonnam Dragons	4
Jeonju Citizen	0
FC Seoul	2
FC Anyang	0
Busan IPark (a.e.t.)	1
Pohang Steelers	0
Gwangju FC (a.e.t.)	4
Yonsei University	2
Asan Mugunghwa	2
Ajou University	1
Jeju United	1
Gimhae City	0
Incheon United	0
Suwon Samsung Bluewings	1

Round of 16
Bucheon FC 1995	0
Sangju Sangmu	2
Gyeongnam FC	1
Ulsan Hyundai	2
Gangwon FC	0
Seongnam FC	1
FC Pocheon	0
Mokpo City	1
Daejeon Citizen	1
Jeonnam Dragons	2
FC Seoul	0 (7)
Busan IPark (p)	0 (8)
Gwangju FC	3
Asan Mugunghwa	0
Jeju United	0
Suwon Samsung Bluewings	2

Quarter-finals
Sangju Sangmu	1
Ulsan Hyundai	3
Seongnam FC	0
Mokpo City	3
Jeonnam Dragons	1
Busan IPark	3
Gwangju FC	1
Suwon Samsung Bluewings (a.e.t.)	2

Semi-finals
27 September – Ulsan
Ulsan Hyundai	1
Mokpo City	0
25 October – Busan
Busan IPark (p)	1 (4)
Suwon Samsung Bluewings	1 (2)

Final
29 November, 3 December
Ulsan Hyundai	2	0	2
Busan IPark	1	0	1

=== Round of 32 ===
19 April 2017	Gimhae FC	0–1	Jeju United	Gimhae Stadium
19:30 (UTC+9)

19 April 2017	Jeonnam Dragons	4–0	Jeonju Citizen	Gwangyang Football Stadium
19:00 (UTC+9)

19 April 2017	Gangneung City	0–1	Sangju Sangmu	Gangneung Stadium
19:00 (UTC+9)

19 April 2017	Seongnam FC	3–1	Cheongju City	Tancheon Sports Complex
19:00 (UTC+9)

19 April 2017	Asan Mugunghwa	2–1	Ajou University	Yi Sun-sin Stadium
19:00 (UTC+9)

19 April 2017	Daegu FC	1–2	Gyeongnam FC	Daegu Stadium
19:00 (UTC+9)

19 April 2017	Mokpo City	1–0	Yangpyeong FC	Mokpo International Football Center
14:00 (UTC+9)

19 April 2017	Ulsan Hyundai	3–1	Chuncheon FC	Ulsan Munsu Football Stadium
19:30 (UTC+9)

19 April 2017	Incheon United	0–1	Suwon Samsung Bluewings	Incheon Football Stadium
19:30 (UTC+9)

19 April 2017	Daejeon Citizen	2–0	Yeungnam University	Daejeon World Cup Stadium
19:30 (UTC+9)

19 April 2017	Busan IPark	1–0 (a.e.t.)	Pohang Steelers	Busan Gudeok Stadium
19:30 (UTC+9)

19 April 2017	Gangwon FC	1–0	Daejeon Korail	Alpensia Ski Jumping Stadium
19:00 (UTC+9)

19 April 2017	Jeonbuk Hyundai Motors	0–0 (a.e.t.) (2–4 p)	Bucheon FC 1995	Jeonju Stadium
15:00 (UTC+9)

19 April 2017	Gwangju FC	4–2 (a.e.t.)	Yonsei University	Gwangju World Cup Stadium
19:00 (UTC+9)

19 April 2017	FC Seoul	2–0	FC Anyang	Seoul World Cup Stadium
19:30 (UTC+9)

19 April 2017	FC Pocheon	2–0	Gyeongju KHNP	Pocheon Stadium
15:00 (UTC+9)

=== Round of 16 ===
17 May 2017	Bucheon FC 1995	0–2	Sangju Sangmu	Bucheon Stadium
19:30 (UTC+9)		Report	Cho Young-cheol 18'; Park Su-chang 69'	Attendance: 723

17 May 2017	Gyeongnam FC	1–2	Ulsan Hyundai	Changwon Football Center
19:00 (UTC+9)	Marcão 80'	Report	Lee Jong-ho 63'; Park Yong-woo 90'	Attendance: 672

17 May 2017	FC Pocheon	0–1	Mokpo City	Pocheon Stadium
15:00 (UTC+9)		Report	Kim Yeong-wook 67'	Attendance: 1,562

17 May 2017	Daejeon Citizen	1–2	Jeonnam Dragons	Boeun Sports Complex
(UTC+9)	Jang Jun-young 58'	Report	Feczesin 27'; Jugović 72'	Attendance: 459

17 May 2017	FC Seoul	0–0 (a.e.t.) (7–8 p)	Busan IPark	Seoul World Cup Stadium
19:00 (UTC+9)		Report		Attendance: 2,456
	Penalties
	Ko Yo-han (penalty scored); Damjanović (penalty scored); Lee Seok-hyun (penalty missed); Yoon Seung-won (penalty scored); Osmar (penalty scored); Ju Se-jong (penalty scored); Kim Won-sik (penalty scored); Sim Sang-min (penalty scored); Yun Il-lok (penalty missed)		(penalty scored) Rômulo; (penalty scored) Park Jun-tae; (penalty missed) Heo Beom-san; (penalty scored) Ku Hyun-jun; (penalty scored) Cha Young-hwan; (penalty scored) Lukian; (penalty scored) Kim Jong-hyuk; (penalty scored) Lim You-hwan; (penalty scored) Kim Moon-hwan

17 May 2017	Gangwon FC	0–1	Seongnam FC	Alpensia Ski Jumping Stadium
19:00 (UTC+9)		Report	Oršulić 67'	Attendance: 488

17 May 2017	Gwangju FC	3–0	Asan Mugunghwa	Gwangju World Cup Stadium
19:00 (UTC+9)	Jo Ju-young 13', 53'; Kim Si-woo 83'	Report		Attendance: 535

6 June 2017	Jeju United	0–2	Suwon Samsung Bluewings	Jeju World Cup Stadium
19:00 (UTC+9)		Report	Johnathan 62'; Júnior Santos 82'	Attendance: 799

=== Quarter-finals ===
9 August 2017	Ulsan Hyundai	3–1	Sangju Sangmu	Ulsan Munsu Football Stadium
19:30 (UTC+9)	Subotić 20'; Kim In-sung 56'; Oršić 79'	Report	Park Su-chang 39'	Attendance: 1,433

9 August 2017	Seongnam FC	0–3	Mokpo City	Tancheon Sports Complex
20:00 (UTC+9)		Report	Jung Hun-sung 2'; Lee In-gyu 24'; Kim Yeong-wook 42'	Attendance: 2,017

9 August 2017	Jeonnam Dragons	1–3	Busan IPark	Gwangyang Football Stadium
19:00 (UTC+9)	Kim Young-wook 9'	Report	Léo Mineiro 41'; Choi Seung-in 75'	Attendance: 859

9 August 2017	Suwon Samsung Bluewings	2–1 (a.e.t.)	Gwangju FC	Suwon World Cup Stadium
19:30 (UTC+9)	Júnior Santos 86', 115'	Report	Jo Ju-young 57'	Attendance: 3,870

=== Semi-finals ===
27 September 2017	Ulsan Hyundai	1–0	Mokpo City	Ulsan Munsu Football Stadium
19:30 (UTC+9)	Kim In-sung 78'	Report		Attendance: 1,617

25 October 2017	Busan IPark	1–1 (a.e.t.) (4–2 p)	Suwon Samsung Bluewings	Busan Gudeok Stadium
19:30 (UTC+9)	Lee Jung-hyup 78'	Report	Yeom Ki-hun 66' (pen.)	Attendance: 2,215
	Penalties
	Rômulo (penalty scored); Han Ji-ho (penalty scored); Lee Jung-hyup (penalty missed); Cha Young-hwan (penalty scored); Ko Kyung-min (penalty scored)		(penalty scored) Johnathan; (penalty scored) Kim Min-woo; (penalty missed) Jo Sung-jin; (penalty missed) Kim Eun-sun

=== Final ===
29 November 2017 First leg	Busan IPark	1–2	Ulsan Hyundai	Busan Gudeok Stadium
19:30 (UTC+9)	Lee Dong-jun 85'	Report	Kim Seung-jun 20'; Lee Jong-ho 57'	Attendance: 2,721; Referee: Ko Hyung-jin

3 December 2017 Second leg	Ulsan Hyundai	0–0 (2–1 agg.)	Busan IPark	Ulsan Munsu Football Stadium
13:30 (UTC+9)		Report		Attendance: 12,562; Referee: Kim Dong-jin

== See also ==
- 2017 in South Korean football
- 2017 K League Classic
- 2017 K League Challenge
- 2017 Korea National League
- 2017 K3 League Advanced
- 2017 K3 League Basic
