= 2012 Korea National League Championship =

Woori Bank 2012 National League Championship

Tournament details
- Country: South Korea
- City: Yanggu, Gangwon
- Dates: 1–13 June 2012
- Teams: 15

Final positions
- Champions: Suwon City (3rd title)
- Runner-up: Hyundai Mipo Dockyard

Tournament statistics
- Matches played: 28
- Goals scored: 104 (3.71 per match)
- Top goal scorer(s): Yang Dong-hyun (5 goals)

Awards
- Best player: Lee Young-gyun

The 2012 Korea National League Championship, known as Woori Bank 2012 National League Championship, is the ninth competition of the Korea National League Championship. R League team Korean Police was invited to the competition.

== Group stage ==
=== Group A ===
Pos	Team	Pld	W	D	L	GF	GA	GD	Pts
1	Hyundai Mipo Dockyard	2	1	0	1	6	4	+2	3
2	Daejeon KHNP	2	1	0	1	4	4	0	3
3	Chungju Hummel	2	1	0	1	3	5	–2	3

1 June 2012
14:00

Hyundai Mipo Dockyard	2–3	Daejeon KHNP
Lee Kyung-sik 5'; Lee Jae-min 70'		Jo Ju-young 35'; Kang Sung-bok 76'; Park Kyung-wan 77'

Yanggu Sports Complex A, Yanggu

3 June 2012
16:00

Hyundai Mipo Dockyard	4–1	Chungju Hummel
Park Jin-sub 17'; Jeong Seon-ho 31'; Lee Geon-min 59'; Lee Yong-jun 71'		Kim Kwang-hyun 57'

Yanggu Sports Complex A, Yanggu

6 June 2012
16:00

Chungju Hummel	2–1	Daejeon KHNP
Kim Dong-woo 80'; Kim Min 85'		Kang Sung-bok 16'

Yanggu Sports Complex A, Yanggu

=== Group B ===
Pos	Team	Pld	W	D	L	GF	GA	GD	Pts
1	Korean Police	3	2	0	1	9	4	+5	6
2	Yongin City	3	2	0	1	6	5	+1	6
3	Incheon Korail	3	1	0	2	6	6	0	3
4	Cheonan City	3	1	0	2	6	12	–6	3

1 June 2012
14:00

Korean Police	1–2	Yongin City
Yang Dong-hyun 77'		Ko Kyung-min 49'; Shin Jun-su 53'

Yanggu Sports Complex A, Yanggu

1 June 2012
16:00

Incheon Korail	4–2	Cheonan City
Kim Tae-wook 8', 10', 79'; Lee Keun-won 58'		Kim Jin-sol 23', 62'

Yanggu Sports Complex B, Yanggu

3 June 2012
14:00

Korean Police	2–1	Incheon Korail
Lee Yong-seung 33'; Yang Dong-hyun 65'		Kim Hyung-woon 21'

Yanggu Sports Complex B, Yanggu

3 June 2012
14:00

Yongin City	2–3	Cheonan City
Ko Kyung-min 28', 58'		Choi Seung-ki 36'; Kim Jin-sol 64'; Oh Jae-hyuk 85'

Yanggu Sports Complex A, Yanggu

6 June 2012
14:00

Cheonan City	1–6	Korean Police
Cho Min-seok 53'		Kim Young-hoo 1', 90+2'; Yang Dong-hyun 17', 42', 85'; Kim Young-woo 66'

Yanggu Sports Complex B, Yanggu

6 June 2012
14:00

Incheon Korail	1–2	Yongin City
Lee Seung-hwan 88'		Ko Kyung-min 8', 69'

Yanggu Sports Complex A, Yanggu

=== Group C ===
Pos	Team	Pld	W	D	L	GF	GA	GD	Pts
1	Suwon City	3	2	1	0	8	3	+5	7
2	Busan Transportation Corporation	3	2	0	1	6	5	+1	6
3	Ansan H FC	3	1	0	2	4	8	–4	3
4	Gimhae City	3	0	1	2	4	6	–2	1

2 June 2012
14:00

Busan Transportation Corp.	1–0	Ansan H FC
Joo Ki-ho 63'

Yanggu Sports Complex A, Yanggu

2 June 2012
14:00

Gimhae City	0–0	Suwon City

Yanggu Sports Complex B, Yanggu

4 June 2012
16:00

Busan Transportation Corporation	2–1	Gimhae City
Park Kyu-tae 1'; Cha Chul-ho 46'		Gu Hyun-seo 89'

Yanggu Sports Complex B, Yanggu

4 June 2012
16:00

Ansan H FC	0–4	Suwon City
		Park Jong-chan 9', 66'; Kim Han-won 11', 65'

Yanggu Sports Complex A, Yanggu

7 June 2012
16:00

Suwon City	4–3	Busan Transportation Corporation
Yoo Su-hyun 14'; Lim Sung-taek 31'; Kim Han-won 64'; Park Im-soo 90'		Kwon Yong-hyuk 54'; Kim Kyung-choon 79'; Cha Chul-ho 89'

Yanggu Sports Complex B, Yanggu

7 June 2012
16:00

Gimhae City	3–4	Ansan H FC
Kwon Jin-sung 23'; Bang Jeong-rok 26'; Cho Yong-hyun 71'		Hong Sang-won 5'; Byun Ha-young 83', 89'; Lee Sung-gil 87'

Yanggu Sports Complex A, Yanggu

=== Group D ===
Pos	Team	Pld	W	D	L	GF	GA	GD	Pts
1	Goyang KB Kookmin Bank	3	2	0	1	6	3	+3	6
2	Gangneung City	3	1	1	1	8	8	0	4
3	Changwon City	3	1	1	1	4	4	0	4
4	Mokpo City	3	1	0	2	4	7	–3	3

2 June 2012
16:00

Changwon City	2–2	Gangneung City
Ahn Sung-hoon 67'; Lee Dong-hyun 77' (o.g.)		Kim Dong-young 41' (o.g.); Lee Sang-keun 66'

Yanggu Sports Complex A, Yanggu

2 June 2012
16:00

Mokpo City	0–2	Goyang KB Kookmin Bank
		Ha Jung-heon 45'; Lee Jae-won 56'

Yanggu Sports Complex B, Yanggu

4 June 2012
14:00

Changwon City	1–2	Mokpo City
Lim Jong-wook 11'		Yang Se-keun 40'; Han Jae-man 72'

Yanggu Sports Complex B, Yanggu

4 June 2012
14:00

Gangneung City	2–4	Goyang KB Kookmin Bank
Lee Sung-min 78', 90'		Lee Jae-won 14'; Park Byung-won 49'; Don Ji-deok 59'; Kim Young-nam 75'

Yanggu Sports Complex A, Yanggu

7 June 2012
14:00

Goyang KB Kookmin Bank	0–1	Changwon City
		Kim Joon-tae 60'

Yanggu Sports Complex B, Yanggu

7 June 2012
14:00

Mokpo City	2–4	Gangneung City
Kwon Soon-hak 11', 22'		Jin Chang-soo 4', 46'; Lee Dong-hyun 37', 89'

Yanggu Sports Complex A, Yanggu

== Knockout stage ==
=== Bracket ===
Quarter-finals
A1	Hyundai Mipo Dockyard	1
C2	Busan Transportation Corporation	0
B1	Korean Police	5
D2	Gangneung City	0
C1	Suwon City	1
A2	Daejeon KHNP	0
D1	Goyang KB Kookmin Bank	1
B2	Yongin City	0

Semi-finals
Hyundai Mipo Dockyard	2
Korean Police	1
Suwon City	4
Goyang KB Kookmin Bank	3

Final
Hyundai Mipo Dockyard	0
Suwon City	2

=== Quarter-finals ===
9 June 2012
14:00 UTC+9

Hyundai Mipo Dockyard	1–0	Busan Transportation Corporation
Park Jin-sub 88'

Yanggu Sports Complex B, Yanggu

9 June 2012
14:00 UTC+9

Korean Police	5–0	Gangneung City
Yoon Dong-min 36'; Park Sung-jae 56'; Kim Oh-sung 62'; Kim Young-hoo 62'; Kwon Hyuk-jin 68'

Yanggu Sports Complex A, Yanggu

9 June 2012
16:00 UTC+9

Suwon City	1–0	Daejeon KHNP
Park Jong-chan 14'

Yanggu Sports Complex B, Yanggu

9 June 2012
16:00 UTC+9

Goyang KB Kookmin Bank	1–0	Yongin City
Kim Young-nam 70'

Yanggu Sports Complex A, Yanggu

=== Semi-finals ===
11 June 2012
14:00 UTC+9

Hyundai Mipo Dockyard	2–1	Korean Police
Shin Kyung-mo 22'; Lee Kyung-sik 44'		Kim Oh-sung 57'

Yanggu Sports Complex A, Yanggu

11 June 2012
16:00 UTC+9

Suwon City	4–3	Goyang KB Kookmin Bank
Kim Jong-sung 12'; Yoo Soo-hyun 16'; Park Jong-chan 30'; Yoo Man-ki 45+1'		Don Ji-deok 3'; Kim Young-nam 34'; Lee Sang-woo 84'

Yanggu Sports Complex A, Yanggu

=== Final ===
13 June 2012
14:00 UTC+9

Hyundai Mipo Dockyard	0–2	Suwon City
		Park Jong-chan 20'; Kim Jong-sung 22'

Yanggu Sports Complex A, Yanggu

== See also ==
- 2012 in South Korean football
- 2012 Korea National League
