= Song Jin-kyu =

South Korean footballer

Song Jin-Kyu
Personal information
- Date of birth: 12 July 1997 (age 29)
- Place of birth: South Korea
- Height: 1.77 m (5 ft 10 in)
- Position: Midfielder

Team information
- Current team: Chungbuk Cheongju FC
- Number: 15

Youth career
- Suwon Samsung Bluewings

Senior career*
Years	Team	Apps	(Gls)
2019–2020	Suwon Samsung Bluewings	7	(0)
2020–2023	Ansan Greeners	36	(6)
2021	→ Gimpo Citizen (loan)	4	(0)
2023–2025	Bucheon FC	22	(1)
2025–	Cheongju	7	(1)
- * Club domestic league appearances and goals as of 29 December 2025

Song Jin-Kyu (Korean: 송진규; born 12 July 1997) is a South Korean professional footballer, who plays as a midfielder for Chungbuk Cheongju FC in the K League 2. He previously played for Suwon Samsung Bluewings and Ansan Greeners.

== Honours ==
Suwon Bluewings

- Korean FA Cup: 2019

Gimpo Citizen

- K3 League: 2021
