= Park Jae-hong (footballer, born 1978) =

South Korean footballer

Personal information
- Date of birth: 10 November 1978 (age 48)
- Place of birth: Seoul, South Korea
- Height: 1.84 m (6 ft 0 in)
- Position: Defender

Youth career
- 1997–2000: Myongji University

Senior career*
Years	Team	Apps	(Gls)
2001–2002	Sangmu (military service)	not joined K1	
2003–2004	Jeonbuk Hyundai Motors	47	(2)
2005–2006	Chunnam Dragons	38	(0)
2006–2007	Universitatea Cluj	28	(2)
2008–2009	Gyeongnam	26	(0)
2010	Jiangsu Sainty	30	(0)
2011	Gyeongnam	22	(0)
2012	INSEE Police United	26	(0)
2013	Gyeongnam	0	(0)
Total		217	(4)

International career
1999–2000	South Korea U-23	29	(1)
2000–2005	South Korea	31	(0)

Managerial career
- 2015: Bucheon (scout)
- 2016: Bucheon (assistant manager)
- 2017: Bucheon Reserves
- 2023: Yangju Citizen
- 2024–2025: Kelantan Darul Naim
- * Club domestic league appearances and goals

- Park Jae-hong
- Hangul: 박재홍
- Hanja: 朴載弘
- RR: Bak Jaehong
- MR: Pak Chaehong

Park Jae-hong (Korean: 박재홍; born 10 November 1978) is a South Korean retired football player.

== Playing career ==
He played domestically for Sangmu (while on military service), Jeonbuk Hyundai Motors, Chunnam Dragons and Gyeongnam, as well as for Romanian club Universitatea Cluj (where he went to play alongside fellow South Korean Kim Jong-chun, thus becoming the first foreign footballers in the club's history), Chinese club Jiangsu Sainty and Thai club INSEE Police United.

== Managerial statistics ==
As of 24 January 2025

Managerial record by team and tenure
Team	Nat	From	To	Record					Ref.
Team	Nat	From	To	G	W	D	L	Win%	Ref.
Yangju Citizen	(South Korea)	8 August 2023	31 December 2023	9	0	1	8	0.00	
Kelantan Darul Naim	(Malaysia)	19 April 2024	24 January 2025	22	2	1	19	9.09	
Career Total				31	2	2	27	6.45	

== Honours ==
=== As Player ===
Jeonbuk Hyundai Motors

- FA Cup: 2003
- Korean Super Cup: 2004

Chunnam Dragons

- FA Cup: 2006

Universitatea Cluj

- Liga II: 2006–07

Gyeongnam

- FA Cup runner-up: 2008
