= 2009 K3 League =

Daum K3 League
- Season: 2009
- Dates: 21 March – 28 November 2009
- Champions: Pocheon FC (1st title)
- Matches: 272
- Goals: 1,020 (3.75 per match)
- Best Player: Oh Tae-hwan
- Top goalscorer: Jeon Hat-bit (21 goals)
- Best goalkeeper: Kim Dong-young

The 2009 K3 League, also known as Daum K3 League 2009, was the third season of the amateur K3 League. All clubs played a home-and-away season, and the playoffs were not held this year. Before the start of the season, Changwon United and Seoul Pabal withdrew from the league, while Cheongju Jikji, Icheon Citizen and Seoul FC Martyrs joined the league.

== League table ==
| Pos | Team | Pld | W | D | L | GF | GA | GD | Pts | Qualification |
|---|---|---|---|---|---|---|---|---|---|---|
| 1 | Pocheon FC (C) | 32 | 19 | 10 | 3 | 79 | 29 | +50 | 67 | Qualification for the FA Cup second round |
| 2 | Gwangju Gwangsan | 32 | 20 | 4 | 8 | 65 | 25 | +40 | 64 | Qualification for the FA Cup first round |
| 3 | Yongin Citizen | 32 | 18 | 6 | 8 | 76 | 39 | +37 | 60 | Qualification for the FA Cup first round |
| 4 | Bucheon FC 1995 | 32 | 17 | 9 | 6 | 62 | 37 | +25 | 60 | Qualification for the FA Cup first round |
| 5 | Icheon Citizen | 32 | 16 | 10 | 6 | 70 | 35 | +35 | 58 | Qualification for the FA Cup first round |
| 6 | Cheonan FC | 32 | 17 | 6 | 9 | 63 | 38 | +25 | 57 | Qualification for the FA Cup first round |
| 7 | Namyangju United | 32 | 17 | 5 | 10 | 79 | 48 | +31 | 56 | Qualification for the FA Cup first round |
| 8 | Cheongju Jikji | 32 | 15 | 6 | 11 | 61 | 47 | +14 | 51 | Qualification for the FA Cup first round |
| 9 | Gyeongju Citizen | 32 | 13 | 9 | 10 | 74 | 32 | +42 | 48 | Qualification for the FA Cup first round |
| 10 | Yangju Citizen | 32 | 14 | 6 | 12 | 60 | 45 | +15 | 48 | |
| 11 | Jeonju FC | 32 | 13 | 6 | 13 | 59 | 42 | +17 | 45 | |
| 12 | Samcheok Shinwoo Electronics | 32 | 13 | 5 | 14 | 73 | 49 | +24 | 44 | |
| 13 | Seoul United | 32 | 11 | 7 | 14 | 70 | 56 | +14 | 40 | |
| 14 | Jeonju Ongoeul | 32 | 11 | 7 | 14 | 54 | 58 | −4 | 40 | |
| 15 | Goyang Citizen | 32 | 5 | 1 | 26 | 29 | 125 | −96 | 16 | |
| 16 | Asan United | 32 | 1 | 3 | 28 | 28 | 121 | −93 | 6 | |
| 17 | Seoul FC Martyrs | 32 | 2 | 0 | 30 | 18 | 194 | −176 | 6 | |

Source: Soccerway KFA
Rules for classification: 1) Points; 2) Goal difference; 3) Goals scored.
(C) Champions

== See also ==
- 2009 in South Korean football
- 2009 Korean FA Cup
