= Kim Jong-chun =

South Korean footballer (born 1976)

Kim Jong-Chun

Personal information
- Date of birth: July 7, 1976 (age 50)
- Place of birth: South Korea
- Height: 1.70 m (5 ft 7 in)
- Position: Defender

Senior career*
Years	Team	Apps	(Gls)
1999–2005	Pohang Steelers	68	(3)
2002–2003	→ Gwangju Sangmu Bulsajo (army)	34	(1)
2006	Jeonbuk Hyundai Motors	2	(0)
2007	Universitatea Cluj	5	(0)
2007–2008	Yongin Citizen	8	(2)
Total		117	(6)
- * Club domestic league appearances and goals

Kim Jong-Chun (born July 7, 1976) is a retired South Korean football player, who last played for the amateur side Yongin Citizen F.C. in South Korea.

Kim previously played for Pohang Steelers, Gwangju Sangmu Bulsajo and Jeonbuk Hyundai Motors in the K-League. In 2007, he went to play in Romania alongside fellow South Korean Park Jae-hong for Liga II team, Universitatea Cluj, thus becoming the first foreign footballers in the club's history.

== Honours ==
Universitatea Cluj

- Liga II: 2006–07
