= 2008 Korean FA Cup =

2008 Hana Bank FA Cup

Tournament details
- Country: South Korea

Final positions
- Champions: Pohang Steelers (2nd title)
- Runners-up: Gyeongnam FC

Tournament statistics
- Top goal scorer: Kim Dong-chan (6 goals)

Awards
- Best player: Choi Hyo-jin

The 2008 Korean FA Cup, known as the 2008 Hana Bank FA Cup, was the 13th edition of the Korean FA Cup. It began on 24 February 2008, and ended on 21 December 2008. Pohang Steelers claimed their second title after beating Gyeongnam FC 2–0 in the final.

== Qualifying rounds ==
=== First round ===
24 February	Jeonju EM	1–1 (6–5 p)	Hwasung Shinwoo Electronics	Gimcheon Stadium
	Choi In-tak 50'		Kim Seung-cheol 61'

24 February	Gangnam TNT	0–6	Gumi Siltron	Gimcheon Stadium
			Hyun Jung-bong 7'; Woo Min-hyuk 50'; Lim Ho 69', 80', 88'; Park Dae-sung 88'

24 February	Sangji University	2–0	MD UHL	Gimcheon Stadium Auxiliary Stadium
	Lee Hee-jun 64'; Yoon Sung-woo 70'

24 February	Yongin FC	0–2	Cheonan FC	Gimcheon Stadium Auxiliary Stadium
			Huh Sung 38'; Lim Joo-ho 44'

=== Second round ===
2 March	Jeonju EM	0–3	Seoul United	Gimcheon Stadium Auxiliary Stadium
			Woo Je-won 9'; Jung Jae-kwon 76'; Chung Myung-ho 90'

2 March	Gumi Siltron	1–2	Cheongju Solveig	Gimcheon Stadium Auxiliary Stadium
	Park Jong-rok 76'		Lee Ki-dong 32'; Han Jae-gook 67'

2 March	Sangji University	0–2	Gimhae City	Gimcheon Stadium
			Cho Sung-yong 6'; Cho Jae-yong 72'

2 March	Cheonan FC	0–0 (8–9 p)	Cheonan City	Gimcheon Stadium

=== Third round ===
9 March	Korea University	0–0 (3–1 p)	Seoul United	Gimcheon Stadium

9 March	Honam University	3–3 (3–1 p)	Cheongju Solveig	Gimcheon Stadium
	Kim Sang-hyuk 25', 53'; Maeng Jin-o 90'		Han Jae-gook 50'; Yoo Hyung-keun 61'; Kwak Seung-hyun 79'

9 March	Yonsei University	1–1 (5–4 p)	Gimhae City	Gimcheon Stadium
	Lee Hoon 46'		Kim Hyun-jun

9 March	Soongsil University	1–1 (3–4 p)	Cheonan City	Gimcheon Stadium
	Lim Kyung-hyun 68'		Gu Hyun-seo 14'

== Final rounds ==
=== Bracket ===
Round of 16
Gyeongnam FC	1
Yonsei University	0
Suwon Samsung Bluewings	1 (4)
Gwangju Sangmu (p)	1 (5)
Goyang KB Kookmin Bank	2
Honam University	1
Changwon City	0
Jeonbuk Hyundai Motors	3
Ansan Hallelujah	1
Daegu FC	3
Ulsan Hyundai	2
Busan IPark	1
Seongnam Ilhwa Chunma (p)	0 (5)
Hyundai Mipo Dockyard	0 (4)
Jeonnam Dragons	0
Pohang Steelers	1

Quarter-finals
Gyeongnam FC	1
Gwangju Sangmu	0
Goyang KB Kookmin Bank (p)	1 (3)
Jeonbuk Hyundai Motors	1 (2)
Daegu FC	2
Ulsan Hyundai	1
Seongnam Ilhwa Chunma	1 (7)
Pohang Steelers (p)	1 (8)

Semi-finals
Gyeongnam FC	5
Goyang KB Kookmin Bank	0
Daegu FC	0
Pohang Steelers	2

Final
Gyeongnam FC	0
Pohang Steelers	2

=== Fourth round ===
Jeonnam Dragons and Pohang Steelers won by default.

21 May	Incheon Korail	0–3	Ulsan Hyundai	Incheon Munhak Stadium Auxiliary Stadium
			Oh Jang-eun 13'; Lee Sang-ho 65'; Kim Sung-min 80'

21 May	Goyang KB Kookmin Bank	1–1 (6–5 p)	FC Seoul	Goyang Stadium
	Lee Jung-woon 9'		Lee Jong-min 33'

21 May	Hongcheon Idu	1–4	Seongnam Ilhwa Chunma	Hongcheon Stadium
	Park Chi-un 54'		Han Dong-won 17', 21'; Pedrão 24'; Sin Young-chul 38'

21 May	Daejeon KHNP	1–2	Daegu FC	Daejeon World Cup Stadium Auxiliary Stadium
	Lee Soo-min 76'		Eninho 17'; Lee Byung-wook 82' (o.g.)

21 May	Changwon City	1–0	Jeju United	Changwon Civil Stadium
	Lee Sang-keun 1'

21 May	Busan Transportation Corporation	0–1	Gyeongnam FC	Busan Gudeok Stadium
			Park Joon-hong 9' (o.g.)

21 May	Ansan Hallelujah	0–0 (5–4 p)	Incheon United	Ansan Wa~ Stadium
	Penalties
	Lee Sung-gil (penalty missed); Jung Jae-yoon (penalty scored); Lee Kwang-hee (penalty scored); Lee Joo-sang (penalty scored); Lim Sung-ho (penalty scored); Oh Ki-jae (penalty missed); Park Do-hyun (penalty scored)		(penalty scored) Radončić; (penalty scored) Lee Jun-young; (penalty missed) Kim Sun-woo; (penalty scored) Ahn Hyun-sik; (penalty scored) Veselinović; (penalty missed) Kim Tae-jin; (penalty missed) Kim Sang-rok

21 May	Gangneung City	0–2	Busan IPark	Gangneung Stadium
			Choi Chul-woo 16'; Reinaldo 22'

21 May	Yesan FC	0–3	Gwangju Sangmu	Buyeo Stadium
			Park Kyu-seon 44'; Kim Seung-yong 69'; Nam Ik-kyung 77'

21 May	Nowon Hummel Korea	0–0 (2–4 p)	Suwon Samsung Bluewings	Bucheon Stadium
	Penalties
	Kim Sin-eui (penalty scored); Oh Tae-hwan (penalty scored); Lee Yong-kyu (penalty missed); Kim Bum-seok (penalty missed)		(penalty scored) Yang Sang-min; (penalty scored) Edu; (penalty scored) Luiz Henrique; (penalty scored) Seo Dong-hyun

21 May	Korea University	0–2	Jeonbuk Hyundai Motors	Gimcheon Stadium
			Lee Hyun-seung 1'; Moon Dae-sung 19'

21 May	Yonsei University	2–2 (3–1 p)	Daejeon Citizen	Gimcheon Stadium
	Choi Jung-han 18'; Cho Chan-ho 68'		Kim Min-soo 44'; Kang Sun-kyu 66'

21 May	Suwon City	1–1 (3–4 p)	Honam University	Suwon Civil Stadium
	Park Hee-wan 63'		Lee Sung-min 10'

21 May	Hyundai Mipo Dockyard	2–0	Cheonan City	Ulsan Complex Stadium
	Kim Ho-yoo 75'; Kim Young-hoo 90+1'

=== Round of 16 ===
19 August	Gyeongnam FC	1–0	Yonsei University	Changwon Civil Stadium
	Kim Dong-chan 64'

20 August	Seongnam Ilhwa Chunma	0–0 (5–4 p)	Hyundai Mipo Dockyard	Seongnam 1 Stadium
	Penalties
	Dudu (penalty scored); Mota (penalty scored); Kim Dong-hyun (penalty scored); Kim Jung-woo (penalty scored); Park Jin-seop (penalty scored)		(penalty missed) Ahn Sung-nam; (penalty scored) Kim Ho-yoo; (penalty scored) Jung Min-mu; (penalty scored) Kim Ki-hyung; (penalty scored) Kim Young-hoo

20 August	Ansan Hallelujah	1–3	Daegu FC	Ansan Wa~ Stadium
	Lim Sung-ho 19'		Hwang Sun-pil 5'; Eninho 45+1'; Ha Dae-sung 62'

20 August	Changwon City	0–3	Jeonbuk Hyundai Motors	Changwon Civil Stadium
			Luiz Henrique 10'; Cho Jae-jin 27'; Kang Min-soo 31'

20 August	Ulsan Hyundai	2–1	Busan IPark	Munsu Cup Stadium
	Luizinho 66'; Park Dong-hyuk 84'		Jeong Shung-hoon 79'

20 August	Goyang KB Kookmin Bank	2–0	Honam University	Goyang Stadium
	Nam Dong-woo 27'; Cho Young-min 83'

20 August	Jeonnam Dragons	0–1	Pohang Steelers	Gwangyang Football Stadium
			Noh Byung-joon 90'

20 August	Suwon Samsung Bluewings	1–1 (4–5 p)	Gwangju Sangmu	Suwon World Cup Stadium
	Edu 76'		Choi Jae-soo 33'
	Penalties
	Lucas Pereira (penalty missed); Yang Sang-min (penalty scored); Edu (penalty scored); Neretljak (penalty scored); Song Chong-gug (penalty scored)		(penalty scored) Sin Dong-geun; (penalty scored) Kang Jin-wook; (penalty scored) Park Kyu-seon; (penalty scored) Kim Tae-yoon; (penalty scored) Kim Myung-joong

=== Quarter-finals ===
5 November	Gyeongnam FC	1–0	Gwangju Sangmu	Hapcheon Stadium
	Kim Dong-chan 10'

5 November	Goyang KB Kookmin Bank	1–1 (3–2 p)	Jeonbuk Hyundai Motors	Goyang Stadium
	Hwang Yeon-seok 88'		Kim Hyung-bum 45'
	Penalties
	Kim Jae-koo (penalty missed); Park Sung-jin (penalty scored); Kim Dong-min (penalty scored); Cha Jong-yoon (penalty missed); Ryu Byung-hoon (penalty scored)		(penalty scored) Cho Jae-jin; (penalty missed) Luiz Henrique; (penalty scored) Kim Hyung-bum; (penalty missed) Choi Tae-uk; (penalty missed) Petrović

5 November	Pohang Steelers	1–1 (8–7 p)	Seongnam Ilhwa Chunma	Steelyard Stadium
	Namgung Do 83'		Mota 32'
	Penalties
	Noh Byung-joon (penalty scored); Kim Gwang-seok (penalty scored); Namgung Do (penalty missed); Park Hee-chul (penalty scored); Park Won-jae (penalty scored); Jang Hyun-kyu (penalty scored); Shin Hyung-min (penalty scored); Choi Hyo-jin (penalty scored); Kim Jae-sung (penalty scored)		(penalty scored) Mota; (penalty scored) Dudu; (penalty missed) Kim Jung-woo; (penalty scored) Jeon Kwang-jin; (penalty scored) Kim Dong-hyun; (penalty scored) Cho Byung-kuk; (penalty scored) Jang Hak-young; (penalty scored) Park Woo-hyun; (penalty missed) Park Jae-yong

5 November	Daegu FC	2–1	Ulsan Hyundai	Daegu World Cup Stadium
	Lee Keun-ho 38', 76'		Luizinho 30'

=== Semi-finals ===
18 December	Gyeongnam FC	5–0	Goyang KB Kookmin Bank	Jeju Stadium
	Kim Dong-chan 30', 43', 49', 90'; Kim Jong-hoon 37'

18 December	Daegu FC	0–2	Pohang Steelers	Jeju Stadium
			Hwang Jae-won 42' (pen.); Lee Gwang-jae 81'

=== Final ===
21 December	Gyeongnam FC	0–2	Pohang Steelers	Jeju Stadium
			Hwang Jin-sung 3'; Kim Jae-sung 78'

== Awards ==
Award	Winner	Team
Most Valuable Player	(South Korea) Choi Hyo-jin	Pohang Steelers
Top goalscorer	(South Korea) Kim Dong-chan	Gyeongnam FC
Best Manager	(Brazil) Sérgio Farias	Pohang Steelers
Fair Play Award	Goyang KB Kookmin Bank	

== See also ==
- 2008 in South Korean football
- 2008 K League
- 2008 Korea National League
- 2008 K3 League
- 2008 U-League
- 2008 Korean League Cup
