= Kwon Soo-hyun =

Kwon Soo-hyun (Korean: 권수현) is a Korean name consisting of the family name Kwon and the given name Soo-hyun, and may also refer to:

- Kwon Soo-hyun (field hockey) (born 1974), South Korean field hockey player
- Kwon Soo-hyun (actor) (born 1986), South Korean actor
