= 2013 Challengers League =

Daum Challengers League
- Season: 2013
- Dates: 2 March – 9 November 2013
- Champions: FC Pocheon (3rd title)
- Matches: 230
- Goals: 863 (3.75 per match)
- Best Player: Jeon Jae-hee
- Top goalscorer: Kim Hyeong-pil (27 goals)
- Best goalkeeper: Kang Jae-wook

The 2013 Challengers League was the seventh season of the amateur K3 League. The top three clubs of each group qualified for the championship playoffs after the home-and-away season of two groups (16 matches per team) and the interleague play (9 matches per team). The first and second-placed teams in the overall table advanced to the final and semi-final respectively, and the other four clubs advanced to the first round. Bucheon FC 1995 and Namyangju United withdrew from the league, but Gimpo Citizen and Hwaseong FC joined the league. Asan United (Yesan Citizen), which had relocated to Yesan the previous year, returned to Asan.

== Teams ==
Club	City	Stadium	Manager
Asan United	Asan	Yi Sun-sin Sports Complex	(South Korea) Jung Nam-kil
Cheonan FC	Cheonan	Cheonan Football Center	(South Korea) Seo Won-sang
Cheongju Jikji	Cheongju	Cheongju Stadium	(South Korea) Kim Jong-hyun
Chuncheon FC	Chuncheon	Chuncheon Stadium	(South Korea) Kim Yong-ho
Gimpo Citizen	Gimpo	Gimpo City Stadium	(South Korea) Yoo Jong-wan
Goyang Citizen	Goyang	Goyang Eoulimnuri ground	(South Korea) Kim Jin-ok
Gwangju Gwangsan	Gwangju	Honam University ground	(South Korea) Kim Kang-seon
Gyeongju Citizen	Gyeongju	Gyeongju Civic Stadium	(South Korea) Kim Jin-hyung
Hwaseong FC	Hwaseong	Hwaseong Stadium	(South Korea) Kim Jong-boo
Icheon Citizen	Icheon	Icheon City Stadium	(South Korea) Lee Hyun-chang
Jeonju Citizen	Jeonju	Jeonju University ground	(South Korea) Yang Young-cheol
Jungnang Chorus Mustang	Seoul	Jungnang Public Ground	(South Korea) Yoo Bong-ki
Paju Citizen	Paju	Paju Public Stadium	(South Korea) Oh Won-jae
FC Pocheon	Pocheon	Pocheon Stadium	(South Korea) In Chang-soo
Seoul FC Martyrs	Seoul	Gangbuk Stadium	(South Korea) Kim Yong-hae
Seoul United	Seoul	Madeul Stadium	(South Korea) Kim Chang-kyum
Yangju Citizen	Yangju	Yangju Stadium	(South Korea) Lee Seung-hee
Yeonggwang FC	Yeonggwang	Yeonggwang Sportium	(South Korea) Kim Han-bong

== Regular season ==
=== Group A ===
Pos	Team	Pld	W	D	L	GF	GA	GD	Pts	Qualification
1	FC Pocheon	25	20	4	1	77	21	+56	64	Qualification for the playoffs
2	Icheon Citizen	25	16	5	4	59	25	+34	53	Qualification for the playoffs
3	Cheongju Jikji	25	13	7	5	52	31	+21	46	Qualification for the playoffs
4	Gimpo Citizen	25	13	3	9	50	40	+10	42	
5	Jeonju Citizen	25	12	4	9	47	42	+5	40	
6	Yeonggwang FC	25	9	8	8	38	38	0	35	
7	Cheonan FC	25	9	4	12	45	59	−14	31	
8	Gwangju Gwangsan	25	6	3	16	27	62	−35	21	
9	Goyang Citizen	25	3	2	20	31	74	−43	11	

Source: KFA (in Korean)
Rules for classification: 1) Points; 2) Goal difference; 3) Goals scored.

=== Group B ===
Pos	Team	Pld	W	D	L	GF	GA	GD	Pts	Qualification
1	Hwaseong FC	25	16	5	4	86	21	+65	53	Qualification for the playoffs
2	Paju Citizen (Note: Paju Citizen was deducted 1 point.)	25	14	4	7	61	37	+24	45	Qualification for the playoffs
3	Gyeongju Citizen	25	12	5	8	54	32	+22	41	Qualification for the playoffs
4	Chuncheon FC	25	11	5	9	35	33	+2	38	
5	Seoul United	25	11	3	11	53	54	−1	36	
6	Yangju Citizen	25	10	4	11	46	47	−1	34	
7	Jungnang Chorus Mustang	25	6	4	15	38	68	−30	22	
8	Seoul FC Martyrs	25	4	2	19	24	92	−68	14	
9	Asan United	25	2	4	19	40	87	−47	10	

Source: KFA (in Korean)
Rules for classification: 1) Points; 2) Goal difference; 3) Goals scored.

=== Overall table ===
Pos	Team	Pld	W	D	L	GF	GA	GD	Pts	Qualification
1	FC Pocheon	25	20	4	1	77	21	+56	64	Qualification for the playoffs final
2	Hwaseong FC	25	16	5	4	86	21	+65	53	Qualification for the playoffs semi-final
3	Icheon Citizen	25	16	5	4	59	25	+34	53	Qualification for the playoffs first round
4	Cheongju Jikji	25	13	7	5	52	31	+21	46	Qualification for the playoffs first round
5	Paju Citizen	25	14	4	7	61	37	+24	45	Qualification for the playoffs first round
6	Gyeongju Citizen	25	12	5	8	54	32	+22	41	Qualification for the playoffs first round
7	Gimpo Citizen	25	13	3	9	50	40	+10	42	
8	Jeonju Citizen	25	12	4	9	47	42	+5	40	
9	Chuncheon FC	25	11	5	9	35	33	+2	38	
10	Seoul United	25	11	3	11	53	54	−1	36	
11	Yeonggwang FC	25	9	8	8	38	38	0	35	
12	Yangju Citizen	25	10	4	11	46	47	−1	34	
13	Cheonan FC	25	9	4	12	45	59	−14	31	
14	Jungnang Chorus Mustang	25	6	4	15	38	68	−30	22	
15	Gwangju Gwangsan	25	6	3	16	27	62	−35	21	
16	Seoul FC Martyrs	25	4	2	19	24	92	−68	14	
17	Goyang Citizen	25	3	2	20	31	74	−43	11	Disqualification from the FA Cup
18	Asan United	25	2	4	19	40	87	−47	10	Disqualification from the FA Cup

Source: KFA Soccerway
Rules for classification: 1) Points; 2) Goal difference; 3) Goals scored.

== Championship playoffs ==
=== Bracket ===
First round
3	Icheon Citizen	2 (4)
6	Gyeongju Citizen (p)	2 (5)
4	Cheongju Jikji	1
5	Paju Citizen	3

Second round
Paju Citizen	1
Gyeongju Citizen	0

Semifinal
2	Hwaseong FC	1
Paju Citizen	2

Final
1	FC Pocheon	4
Paju Citizen	0

=== First round ===
5 October 2013

Icheon Citizen	2–2	Gyeongju Citizen
Penalties
	4–5

Icheon City Stadium, Icheon

5 October 2013

Cheongju Jikji	1–3	Paju Citizen

Cheongju Stadium, Cheongju

=== Second round ===
26 October 2013

Paju Citizen	1–0	Gyeongju Citizen

Paju Public Stadium, Paju

=== Semi-final ===
2 November 2013

Hwaseong FC	1–2	Paju Citizen

Hwaseong Stadium, Hwaseong

=== Final ===
9 November 2013

FC Pocheon	4–0	Paju Citizen

Pocheon Stadium, Pocheon

== See also ==
- 2013 in South Korean football
- 2013 Korean FA Cup
