= 2008 K3 League =

Daum K3 League
- Season: 2008
- Dates: 22 March - 6 December 2008
- Champions: Yangju FC (1st title)
- Matches: 228
- Goals: 1,003 (4.4 per match)
- Best Player: Choi Yoon-seok
- Top goalscorer: Park Jong-yoon (25 goals)

The 2008 K3 League was the second season of the amateur K3 League. It consisted of two regular stages and the final playoffs. The winners of each stage and the top two clubs of the overall table qualified for the league playoffs and the 2009 Korean FA Cup. The fifth-placed team also qualified for the Korean FA Cup.

== Regular season ==
=== First stage ===
Pos	Team	Pld	W	D	L	GF	GA	GD	Pts	Qualification
1	Hwasung Shinwoo Electronics	15	11	3	1	42	14	+28	36	Qualification for the playoffs and the FA Cup
2	Gwangju Gwangsan	15	11	1	3	38	17	+21	34	
3	Yongin FC	15	9	5	1	35	13	+22	32	
4	Seoul United	15	9	2	4	33	19	+14	29	
5	Yangju FC	15	8	4	3	27	14	+13	28	
6	Jeonju Ongoeul	15	8	2	5	43	26	+17	26	
7	Cheonan FC	15	7	4	4	30	26	+4	25	
8	Namyangju Citizen	15	7	3	5	31	21	+10	24	
9	Jeonju EM	15	7	2	6	25	18	+7	23	
10	Seoul Pabal	15	7	1	7	38	27	+11	22	
11	Bucheon FC 1995	15	5	4	6	19	17	+2	19	
12	Asan United FC	15	6	1	8	29	40	−11	19	
13	Gyeongju Citizen	15	3	1	11	21	38	−17	10	
14	Changwon United	15	1	2	12	23	56	−33	5	
15	Pocheon FC	15	1	2	12	13	53	−40	5	
16	Goyang FC	15	1	1	13	19	67	−48	4	

Source: JoinKFA Soccerway

=== Second stage ===
Pos	Team	Pld	W	D	L	GF	GA	GD	Pts	Qualification
1	Yongin FC	14	10	2	2	38	21	+17	32	Qualification for the playoffs and the FA Cup
2	Yangju FC	14	9	2	3	35	28	+7	29	
3	Hwaseong Shinwoo Electronics	14	7	4	3	26	19	+7	25	
4	Gwangju Gwangsan	14	7	2	5	31	19	+12	23	
5	Asan United FC	14	7	2	5	34	32	+2	23	
6	Namyangju Citizen	14	6	4	4	34	30	+4	22	
7	Cheonan FC	14	6	3	5	28	28	0	21	
8	Gyeongju Citizen	14	6	2	6	31	27	+4	20	
9	Jeonju Ongoeul (Note: Jeonju Ongoeul have 6 points deducted.)	14	7	4	3	29	15	+14	19	
10	Seoul United	14	5	4	5	30	28	+2	19	
11	Pocheon FC	14	5	1	8	30	27	+3	16	
12	Jeonju EM	14	4	4	6	29	32	−3	16	
13	Bucheon FC 1995	14	2	3	9	21	36	−15	9	
14	Seoul Pabal	14	1	4	9	22	46	−24	7	
15	Goyang FC	14	1	3	10	23	53	−30	6	
16	Changwon United	0	0	0	0	0	0	0	0	Withdrew (Note: Changwon United withdrew after playing two matches, and their matches were invalidated.)

Source: JoinKFA Soccerway

=== Overall table ===
Pos	Team	Pld	W	D	L	GF	GA	GD	Pts	Qualification
1	Yongin FC	29	19	7	3	73	34	+39	64	Second stage winners
2	Hwaseong Shinwoo Electronics	29	18	7	4	68	33	+35	61	First stage winners
3	Gwangju Gwangsan	29	18	3	8	69	36	+33	57	Qualification for the playoffs and the FA Cup
4	Yangju FC	29	17	6	6	62	42	+20	57	Qualification for the playoffs and the FA Cup
5	Seoul United	29	14	6	9	63	47	+16	48	Qualification for the FA Cup
6	Namyangju Citizen	29	13	7	9	65	51	+14	46	
7	Cheonan FC	29	13	7	9	58	54	+4	46	
8	Jeonju Ongoeul (Note: Jeonju Ongoeul have 6 points deducted.)	29	15	6	8	72	41	+31	45	
9	Asan United FC	29	13	3	13	63	72	−9	42	
10	Jeonju EM	29	11	6	12	54	50	+4	39	
11	Gyeongju Citizen	29	9	3	17	52	65	−13	30	
12	Seoul Pabal	29	8	5	16	60	73	−13	29	
13	Bucheon FC 1995	29	7	7	15	40	53	−13	28	
14	Pocheon FC	29	6	3	20	43	80	−37	21	
15	Goyang FC	29	2	4	23	42	120	−78	10	
16	Changwon United	15	1	2	12	23	56	−33	5	

Source: JoinKFA Soccerway

== Championship playoffs ==
=== Bracket ===
Semi-finals
Yongin FC	3 (4)
Yangju FC (p)	3 (5)
Hwaseong Shinwoo Electronics	1
Gwangju Gwangsan FC	0

Final
Yangju FC (a)	0	2	2
Hwaseong Shinwoo Electronics	0	2	2

=== Semi-finals ===
November 22

Yongin FC	3–3 (a.e.t.)	Yangju FC
Cho Hyun-doo 44'; Kim Jong-cheon 64'; Moon Ji-hwan 119'		Park Byung-seon 56'; Lee Sung-jae 86'; Park Jung-in 100'
Penalties
	4–5

Yongin Sports Complex, Yongin

November 22

Hwaseong Shinwoo Electronics	1–0	Gwangju Gwangsan
Kim Dae-moon 71'

Bibong Stadium, Hwaseong

=== Final ===
November 29

Yangju FC	0–0	Hwaseong Shinwoo Electronics

Yangju Godeok Stadium, Yangju

December 6

Hwaseong Shinwoo Electronics	2–2	Yangju FC
Kim Seung-chul 56'; Lee Chan-dong 60'		Park Jung-in 48'; Yoo Byung-sik 79'

Bibong Stadium, Hwaseong

2–2 on aggregate; Yangju FC won on away goals.

== See also ==
- 2008 in South Korean football
- 2008 Korean FA Cup
