= Seoul Nowon United FC =

South Korean football club

Seoul Nowon United FC 서울노원유나이티드스포츠클럽
- Full name: Seoul Nowon United Football Club 서울노원유나이티드스포츠클럽
- Founded: 31 March 2007; 19 years ago
- Dissolved: 14 January 2025; 16 months ago
- Ground: Nowon Madeul Stadium
- Capacity: 446
- Owner: (South Korea) Oh Seung-Nok (Nowon Mayor)
- Chairman: (South Korea) Yongman Kwon
- Head coach: (South Korea) Lee Jeong-Jae
- League: (South Korea) K4 League
- Final season; 2024: K4 League, 3rd of 13
Home colours	Away colours

Seoul Nowon United Football Club (Korean: 서울 노원 유나이티드 풋볼 클럽; known as Seoul United FC until 2018) is a South Korean semi-professional football club based in Nowon District, Seoul. It is a founding member of the K3 League.

It last competed in the fourth tier of the South Korean football league system, the 2024 season of the K4 League, and is currently serving a one-season suspension. They will rejoin the league in 2026.

== History ==
=== Founding ===
In 2001, following the K League's decision to relocate the then-capital clubs to other cities, there was a desire to bring professional football back to the city of Seoul.

Following the 2002 Korea/Japan World Cup, Seoul's World Cup Stadium stood empty, except for the occasional international match. The Seoul Metropolitan government sought to offset not only the maintenance cost, but also the construction cost, by creating a new team in Seoul. Members of the online community, Seoul Citizens' Club Supporters' Group (서울시민구단 서포터 모임), along with the Red Devils Seoul Branch, had previously expressed the desire to bring football back to the capital, and saw this an opportunity. But the proposed cost of using Seoul's World Cup Stadium was set at 25 billion won, a price no company was willing to play to start a new club.

With no team or company interested, and the national stadium standing empty, the idea was proposed for two clubs to move to Seoul at a cost of 7.5 billion won each, with the Seoul Metropolitan Government contributing the remaining 10 billion won. Anyang's LG Cheetahs agreed to pay the combined 15 billion won and in 2004 became the new occupants of the World Cup Stadium, delivering a blow to the movement's plans to for a new team.

=== Entry into the league system ===
Despite the setback, the fan push continued, and the establishment of the K3 League in 2007 gave a realistic opportunity for involvement in the league set-up. Two amateur sides, Good Bu&Bu (Good Friend) and Youngseo FC (Jin Seoul), were merged to create the new club and the home venue of 69,950 capacity Seoul Olympic Stadium was chosen.

The club's first match was played on April 21, 2007, a 2–2 home draw with Changwon Dudae FC. Under the banner of “The True Seoul Citizen’s Club”, the team saw initial excitement and success, winning the inaugural K3 League title after a 3–0 aggregate victory over Hwaseong Shinwoo Electronics in the championship final.

=== Following the championship success ===
In the years following their initial success, the team struggled with results and financial deficits. After leaving Seoul Olympic Stadium, they played at Hyochang Stadium before relocating to the 446 capacity Nowon Madeul Stadium in Nowon District, Northern Seoul. In 2019 the team's official name was changed to Seoul Nowon United FC to reflect their ties with Nowon District.

=== Partnerships ===
Since 2013, Seoul United have been involved in various youth projects in the Nowon District. Both male and female youth teams in various age categories were established and dissolved. In 2024 the U18 team was re-established.

In 2015 Seoul United formed a sister relationship with Japanese 3rd tier FC Ryukyu, with the intention to play each other once a year.

In 2021, the futsal team known as FS Seoul moved to Nowon and joined Seoul Nowon United. They are currently known as NowonHR FS and compete in the FK-League.

=== Disbandment ===
On 14 January 2025, two months before the start of the season, the club was handed a one-season suspension. The main reason was the failure of the club to reach an agreement with Nowon District regarding the use of Madeul Stadium, leaving them without a home ground. Following this suspension, the club announced that it would cease operations after 17 years in the league.

=== Resumption of activities ===
When the team disbanded, it was rumoured that they would restructure and revive the club, but these plans were not made public. Then, in May 2025, it was announced that the club had appointed Joo Seung-jin as its new manager. Joo was a long time coach and Assistant Manager at Suwon Samsung Bluewings FC, and manager of Hwaseong FC during their final year in the K3 League. The team would once again function as a private entity and renewed their agreement with Nowon District for the use of Madeul Stadium. It was further announced that they had already recruited players and would start playing practice matching in preparation for the 2026 K4 League season. However, a month later an article was published stating that Joo took a position as a coach at Daegu FC and Jeong Seong-hun, a former national team member, was to be the new manager.

The team was denied entry for the 2026 season because their stadium does not meet the capacity requirements. The requirements came into effect while the team was still active and were excused from complying, similar to Seoul Jungnang FC. But because the team is now re-entering the league, they are required to adhere to the new capacity regulations. The current plan is to join in 2027, but it's not clear where they will play their home matches.

== Team Colours ==
The team primarily plays in a shirt with thick black and white bars, black shorts and white socks, but as is common in the current era, the patterns may vary significantly.

=== Emblem ===
The club's emblem was designed by Jang Bu-da, a well known emblem designer in Korea. Jang was also involved in promotion of the team in the early years and currently owns his own sport promotion agency.

The logo features a shield with the black and white bars of the team shirt. The shield is flanked by two tigers and topped with a blue flame. A banner underneath the shield shows the team name in English. The banner is the only part of the emblem that changed when the team name was changed to Seoul Nowon United FC. The whole emblem is surrounded by a golden, shield shaped frame.

== Managerial history ==
Dates	Name	Notes
January 2007 - December 2008	(South Korea) Im Geun-Jae	2007 K3 League Champions. 2007 Manager of the Year.
January 2009 - December 2009	(South Korea) Lee Chang-Hwan	
January 2010 - July 2011	(South Korea) Kim Gang-Nam	2011 Seoul Mayoral Cup
July 2011 - December 2011	(South Korea) Im Geun-Jae	Reappointment
January 2012 - July 2012	(South Korea) Bae Hyeong-Nyeol	2012 Seoul Mayoral Cup
July 2012 - December 2012	(South Korea) Yun Pyo-Ho	
January 2013 - December 2013	(South Korea) Kim Chang-Geom	2013 Seoul Mayoral Cup
January 2014 - November 2014	(South Korea) Yu Gi-Heung	
December 2014 - June 2016	(South Korea) Choi Sang-Gun	
June 2016 - June 2019	(South Korea) Jo Dong-Hyeon	Relegation from K3 (3rd tier)
July 2019 - November 2022	(South Korea) Lee Jeong-Jae	
November 2022 - December 2023	(South Korea) Lee Chun-Seog	
January 2024 - February 2025	(South Korea) Lee Jeong-Jae	Reappointment. Reached promotion-relegation playoff.
May 2025 - June 2025	(South Korea) Ju Seung-Jin	Former Suwon Samsung Bluewings assistand manager and Hwaseong FC manager.
June 2025	(South Korea) Jeong Seong-hun	Former national team member and Gangwon FC U-18 coach.

== Honours ==
- K3 League
  - Winners (1): 2007

== Season-by-season records ==
Season	Teams	League	Placement	Pld	W	D	L	GF	GA	GD	Pts	FA Cup	Notes
2007	10	K3 League	Champions	18	10	7	1	42	18	+24	37	DNQ	
2008	16	K3 League	5th Overall	29	14	6	9	63	47	+16	48	Third round	
2009	17	K3 League	13th	32	11	7	14	70	56	+14	40	Third round	
2010	18	K3 League	6th in Group B	25	10	8	7	45	29	+16	38	DNQ	
2011	16	K3 Challengers League	2nd in Group B	22	15	4	3	72	25	+47	49	First round	
2012	18	K3 Challengers League	3rd in Group A	16	11	1	4	48	17	+31	34	First round	
2013	18	K3 Challengers League	5th in Group B	16	8	3	5	38	31	+7	27	First round	
2014	18	K3 Challengers League	7th in Group A	25	6	4	15	28	52	–24	22	First round	
2015	18	K3 League	9th in Group B	25	5	4	16	51	59	–8	19	Second round	
2016	20	K3 League	17th	19	3	3	13	26	53	–27	12	First round	
2017	9	K3 League Basic	9th	16	0	2	14	19	64	–45	2	First round	
2018	11	K3 League Basic	10th	20	3	3	14	31	62	–31	12	Second round	
2019	8	K3 League Basic	8th	21	3	2	16	33	81	–48	1 (Note: 10 points deducted.)	DNQ	
2020	13	K4 League	12th	24	4	5	15	32	46	–14	17	First round	
2021	16	K4 League	11th	30	9	5	16	40	53	–13	32	First round	
2022	17	K4 League	7th	32	15	4	13	56	45	11	49	Second round	
2023	17	K4 League	11th	31	10	6	15	51	62	–11	35	First round	
2024	13	K4 League	3rd	42	13	4	7	63	43	30	34 (Note: 9 points deducted for failing to play the final game of the 2023 season.)	First round	
