= Soo-hyun =

- Hangul: 수현
- RR: Suhyeon
- MR: Suhyŏn
- IPA: [suçʌn]

Soo-hyun, also spelled Su-hyeon, or Soo-hyeon, Su-hyun, Su-hyon, is a Korean given name.

People with this name include:

== Entertainers ==
- Kim Su-hyeon (born 1970), South Korean actor
- Hong Soo-hyun (born 1981), South Korean actress
- Claudia Kim (born Kim Soo-hyun, 1985), South Korean actress
- Kwon Soo-hyun (born 1986), South Korean actor
- Choo Soo-hyun (born 1988), South Korean actress
- Kim Soo-hyun (born 1988), South Korean actor
- Lee Su-hyun (born 1999), South Korean singer, member of duo AKMU
- Suhyeon (born Kim Su-hyeon, 2000), South Korean singer, actress, member of girl group Billlie

== Sportspeople ==
- Bang Soo-hyun (born 1972), South Korean female badminton player
- Kwon Soo-hyun (born 1974), South Korean women's field hockey player
- Jeon Soo-hyun (born Jeon Tae-hyun, 1986), South Korean male football goalkeeper (K-League Challenge)
- Yoo Soo-hyun (born 1986), South Korean male football midfielder (K-League Challenge)
- Jong Su-hyon (born 1996), North Korean ice hockey player
- Su-Hyun Oh (born 1996), South Korean-born Australian female golfer

== Others ==
- Kim Soo-hyun (born Kim Soon-ok, 1943), South Korean female writer

== See also ==
- List of Korean given names
