= Sokcho Stadium =

Stadium in Sokcho, South Korea

Sokch Stadium
- Interactive map of Sokch Stadium
- Location: Sokcho, Gangwon-do, South Korea
- Owner: City of Sokcho
- Operator: City of Sokcho
- Capacity: 25,000
- Surface: Natural grass
- Field size: 109 by 68 metres (119 by 74 yards)

Construction
- Opened: 1994

Tenant
- Gangwon FC (2015–2017)

Sokcho Stadium is a multi-purpose stadium in Sokcho, South Korea. It is used mostly for football matches. The stadium has a capacity for 25,000 spectators and was opened in 1994.

Between 2015 and 2017, the stadium was used by K League club Gangwon FC.
