= Cheongju Sports Complex =

Stadium in Cheongju, South Korea

- Interactive map of Cheongju Sports Complex
- Location: Cheongju, South Korea
- Coordinates: 36.637851°N 127.472281°E
- Owner: Cheongju City
- Operator: Cheongju City Facility Management Corporation
- Capacity: 16,280
- Surface: Grass

Construction
- Opened: 1965
- Renovated: 2004, 2013, 2016
- Expanded: 1979

Tenants
- Lucky-Goldstar Football Club (1987–1989); Cheongju City FC (2016–2018); Cheongju FC / Chungbuk Cheongju FC (2009–present)

Cheongju Sports Complex (Korean: 청주종합경기장) is a multi-use stadium in Cheongju, South Korea. It is currently used mostly for football matches and is the home of K League 2 club Chungbuk Cheongju FC. Opened in 1965, the stadium has a seating capacity for 16,280 spectators.
