= Cheongju City FC =

Cheongju City FC 청주 시티 FC
- Full name: Cheongju City Football Club
- Founded: 2005; 21 years ago (as Cheonan FC); 2016; 10 years ago (as Cheongju City FC)
- Dissolved: 2018; 8 years ago (merged with Cheongju FC)
- Ground: Cheongju Stadium
- Capacity: 19,250
- Website: www.cjcityfc.com
Home colours	Away colours

Cheongju City Football Club (Korean: 청주 시티 FC) was a South Korean football club based in the city of Cheongju. The club, originally named Cheonan FC and based in the city of Cheonan, rebranded to Cheongju City FC in February 2016. In October 2018, the club merged with the fellow local side Cheongju FC.

== Season-by-season records ==
=== Cheonan FC ===
Season	Teams	Tier	Placement	Pld	W	D	L	GF	GA	GD	Pts	FA Cup	Manager
2007	10	K3 League	Semifinal	18	8	7	3	30	14	+16	31	Did not qualify	
2008	15	K3 League	7th	29	13	7	9	58	54	+4	46	Round 2	
2009	17	K3 League	6th	32	17	6	9	63	38	+25	57	Did not qualify	
2010	18	K3 League	7th in Group B	25	9	2	14	45	60	–15	29	Preliminary round	
2011	19	K3 Challengers League	6th in Group B	22	6	2	14	37	55	–18	20	Did not qualify	
2012	18	K3 Challengers League	7th in Group B	25	7	10	8	44	43	+1	31	Did not qualify	Park Yoon-ki
2013	18	K3 Challengers League	7th in Group A	25	9	4	12	45	59	–14	31	Round 1	Seo Won-sang
2014	18	K3 Challengers League	9th in Group B	25	4	4	17	19	50	–31	16	Round 1	Seo Won-sang
2015	18	K3 League	5th in Group A	25	9	5	11	61	43	+18	32	Round 1	Seo Won-sang

=== Cheongju City FC ===
Season	League			Korean FA Cup		National Sports Festival	
Season	Division	Competition	Result	Competition	Result	Competition	Result
2016	4	Regular League	3rd	Korean FA Cup	Fourth round	Chungbuk Championship	Winners
2016	4	Poastseason Championship	2nd	Korean FA Cup	Fourth round	KNSF	First round
2017	4	Regular League	2nd	Korean FA Cup	Fourth round	Chungbuk Championship	Eliminated
2017	4	Poastseason Championship	2nd	Korean FA Cup	Fourth round	Chungbuk Championship	Eliminated
2018	4	Regular League	6th	Korean FA Cup	Third round	Chungbuk Championship	Winners
2018	4	Poastseason Championship	DNQ	Korean FA Cup	Third round	KNSF	Qualifying round

== Honours ==
=== Domestic ===
==== League ====
- K3 League

Runners-up (2): 2016, 2017

==== Cup ====
- Korean National Sports Festival

Chungbuk Champions (2): 2016, 2018
