= Jeonju Ongoeul FC =

2005–2010 South Korean football club

Jeonju Ongoeul FC 전주 온고을 FC
- Full name: Jeonju Ongoeul Football Club 전주 온고을 축구단
- Founded: 2005; 21 years ago
- Dissolved: 2010; 16 years ago
- Ground: Jeonju Stadium
- Capacity: 20,242
- Owner: (South Korea) Cho Young-woo
- Chairman: (South Korea) Park Eun
- Manager: (South Korea) Yoo Jong-hee
- League: (South Korea) K3 League
- 2009 Season: 14th
Home colours	Away colours

Jeonju Ongoeul Football Club (Korean: 전주 온고을 FC) was a South Korean soccer club based in the city of Jeonju. It was a member of the K3 League, an amateur league and the third tier of league football in South Korea.

Since 2008, the club had participated in the Korean football league setup but confirmed it would withdraw from the league due to financial difficulties before the 2010 season began.

== Statistics ==
Season	K3 League											KFA Cup	Top scorer (League goals)	Manager
Season	Stage	Teams	P	W	D	L	GF	GA	GD	Pts	Position	KFA Cup	Top scorer (League goals)	Manager
2008	First	16	15	8	2	5	43	26	+17	26	6th	Did not qualify		(South Korea) Yoo Jong-hee
2008	Second	15	14	7	4	3	29	15	+14	19^{1}	9th	Did not qualify		(South Korea) Yoo Jong-hee
2008	Overall	16	29	15	6	8	72	41	+31	45	8th	Did not qualify		(South Korea) Yoo Jong-hee
2009	—	17	32	11	7	14	54	58	−4	40	14th	Did not qualify		(South Korea) Yoo Jong-hee

- 1: Jeonju Ongoeul have 6 points deducted.

== See also ==
- List of football clubs in South Korea
