= An Yong-woo =

South Korean footballer (born 1991)

An Yong-woo 안용우
Personal information
- Full name: An Yong-woo
- Date of birth: 10 August 1991 (age 35)
- Place of birth: South Korea
- Height: 1.78 m (5 ft 10 in)
- Position: Forward

Team information
- Current team: FC Anyang
- Number: 11

Youth career
- 2007–2009: Changwon Machine; Technical High School
- 2010–2013: Dongeui University

Senior career*
Years	Team	Apps	(Gls)
2014–2017	Jeonnam Dragons	111	(13)
2017–2020	Sagan Tosu	48	(4)
2021–2023	Daegu FC	45	(2)
2023–	FC Anyang	16	(1)

International career
2014	South Korea U-23	5	(0)
Medal record
Representing South Korea
Men's football
Asian Games
Gold medal – first place	2014 Incheon	Team
- * Club domestic league appearances and goals as of 26 December 2019

- An Yong-woo
- Hangul: 안용우
- Hanja: 安庸佑
- RR: An Yongu
- MR: An Yongu

An Yong-woo (Korean: 안용우; born 10 August 1991) is a South Korean footballer who last played as a forward for FC Anyang.

== Club career ==
=== Jeonnam Dragons ===
He joined Jeonnam Dragons in 2014. He made his first appearance at the opening match of 2014 K League 1 against FC Seoul.

=== Sagan Tosu ===
In December 2020, An departed Sagan Tosu after four seasons.

== Club statistics ==
Updated to 22 Oct 2022.

Club performance			League		Cup		League Cup		Continental		Total	
Season	Club	League	Apps	Goals	Apps	Goals	Apps	Goals	Apps	Goals	Apps	Goals
South Korea			League		KFA Cup		Other		AFC		Total	
2014	Jeonnam Dragons	K League 1	31	6	0	0	–		–		31	6
2015	Jeonnam Dragons	K League 1	34	3	4	2	–		–		38	5
2016	Jeonnam Dragons	K League 1	32	4	1	0	–		–		33	4
2017	Jeonnam Dragons	K League 1	14	0	2	1	–		–		16	1
Japan			League		Emperor's Cup		J. League Cup		AFC		Total	
2017	Sagan Tosu	J1 League	8	0	0	0	0	0	–		8	0
2018	Sagan Tosu	J1 League	9	2	1	0	4	0	–		14	2
2019	Sagan Tosu	J1 League	22	2	4	1	4	0	–		30	3
2020	Sagan Tosu	J1 League	9	0	–		2	0	–		11	0
South Korea			League		KFA Cup		Other		AFC		Total	
2021	Daegu FC	K League 1	33	0	5	0	–		7	2	45	2
2022	Daegu FC	K League 1	12	2	1	0	–		7	0	20	2
Total			204	19	18	4	10	0	14	2	246	25
