= Jung Min-mu =

South Korean footballer (born 1985)

Personal information
- Full name: Jung Min-mu
- Date of birth: 3 March 1985 (age 41)
- Place of birth: South Korea
- Height: 1.73 m (5 ft 8 in)
- Position: Forward

Team information
- Current team: Goyang Hi FC
- Number: 11

Senior career*
Years	Team	Apps	(Gls)
2005–2009	Ulsan Hyundai Mipo	69	(17)
2012–	Goyang Hi FC	44	(4)
- * Club domestic league appearances and goals as of 28 November 2014

Jung Min-mu (Korean: 정민무; born 3 March 1985) is a South Korean football player who plays for the Goyang Hi FC in K League Challenge.

== Career ==
Jung joined Ulsan Hyundai Mipo in 2005. In 2010, he left the team and joined the army to start his military duty.

He signed with Ansan H FC after finishing his duty in 2012.
