= Don Ji-deok =

South Korean footballer

Don Ji-Deok
Personal information
- Full name: Don Ji-Deok
- Date of birth: 28 April 1980 (age 46)
- Place of birth: South Korea
- Height: 1.83 m (6 ft 0 in)
- Position: Defender

Team information
- Current team: FC Anyang
- Number: 34

Senior career*
| Years | Team | Apps | (Gls) |
| 2007–2012 | Goyang KB | 141 | (5) |
| 2013– | FC Anyang | 15 | (0) |
- * Club domestic league appearances and goals as of 18 December 2013

Don Ji-Deok (Korean: 돈지덕; born 28 April 1980) is a South Korean footballer who plays as defender for FC Anyang in K League Challenge.
