= Yoo Soo-hyun =

South Korean footballer

Yoo Soo-Hyun
Personal information
- Full name: Yoo Soo-Hyun
- Date of birth: 13 May 1986 (age 40)
- Place of birth: South Korea
- Height: 1.75 m (5 ft 9 in)
- Position: Midfielder

Team information
- Current team: FC Anyang
- Number: 6

Youth career
- Sunmoon University

Senior career*
Years	Team	Apps	(Gls)
2009	Suwon City	16	(2)
2010	Chunnam Dragons	1	(0)
2011–2017	Suwon FC	92	(9)
2014–2015	→ Sangju Sangmu (army)	4	(0)
2017	→ FC Anyang (loan)	15	(1)
2018–	FC Anyang	17	(0)
- * Club domestic league appearances and goals as of 1 January 2018

Yoo Soo-Hyun (Korean: 유수현; born 13 May 1986) is a South Korean footballer who plays as midfielder for FC Anyang in K League 2.

== Career ==
He made 3 assists in the league match against Police FC on 6 June 2013.
