= Jo Ju-young =

South Korean footballer (born 1994)

Personal information
- Date of birth: 4 February 1994 (age 32)
- Place of birth: South Korea
- Height: 1.86 m (6 ft 1 in)
- Position: Forward

Team information
- Current team: Chungbuk Cheongju FC
- Number: 18

Youth career
- 2012–2015: Ajou University

Senior career*
Years	Team	Apps	(Gls)
2016–17	Gwangju FC	47	(8)
2018	→ Gimhae FC (loan)	11	(2)
2018	→ Incheon United (loan)	1	(0)
2019	Gwangju FC	10	(1)
2020-21	Cheonan City FC	36	(18)
2022-2025	Chungnam Asan FC	38	(1)
2023-2024	→ Geoje Citizen FC (loan)	41	(21)
2026-	Chungbuk Cheongju FC	15	(0)
- * Club domestic league appearances and goals as of 6 August 2026

Jo Ju-young (Korean: 조주영; born 4 February 1994) is a South Korean footballer who plays as forward for Chungbuk Cheongju FC in K League 2.

== Career ==
Jo Ju-young joined K League Classic side Gwangju FC in January 2016.

He made his debut goal in his debut match against Jeonnam Dragons on 17 April 2016.
