= Seoul Pabal FC =

2007–2008 South Korean football club

Seoul Pabal FC 서울 파발 FC
- Full name: Seoul Pabal Football Club 서울 파발 축구단
- Short name: SPFC
- Founded: 2007; 19 years ago
- Dissolved: 2008; 18 years ago
- Ground: Eunpyeong ground Eunpyeong-gu, Seoul
- Chairman: (South Korea) So Sang-sik
- Manager: (South Korea) Jung Byung-ohk
- League: (South Korea) K3 League
- 2008 Season: 12th
Home colours	Away colours

Seoul Pabal Football Club (Korean: 서울 파발 FC) was a South Korean soccer club based in Eunpyeong-gu, Seoul. It was a member of the K3 League, an amateur league and the third tier of league football in South Korea.

== History ==
The club competed in the 2007 K3 League season as Eunpyeong Chunggoo Sungsim Hospital before changing its name to Seoul Pabal ahead of the 2008 season.

After the 2008 season, the club was closed due to it being proved that some players engaged in the manipulation of the game.
