= Pyeongchang FC =

2008–2019 South Korean association football club

- Full name: Pyeongchang Football Club 평창 FC
- Founded: 2008; 18 years ago as Gwangju Gwangsan FC
- Dissolved: 2019; 7 years ago
- Ground: Honam University ground (2008-2014); Pyeongchang Sports Complex (2015-2019)
- Final season; 2019: K3 League Basic, 7th of 8

Pyeongchang Football Club (Korean: 평창 FC) was a former South Korean football club based in Pyeongchang County, Gangwon-do. The club was founded in 2008 as Gwangju Gwangsan and last played in the K3 League Basic until dissolved in 2019, which was then the fourth tier of football in South Korea.

== History ==
Gwangju Gwangsan 2008-2014.

Gwangju Gwangsan FC was established in 2008 and played in Gwangju until 2014.

Sources regarding their inaugural season are contradictory. Some say Gwangju Gwangsan FC finished first in the league, and were eliminated in the playoffs by Sancheok. Others say Yongin finished first in the league. Whatever their final placing, it allowed them to enter the first round of the following season's Korean FA Cup. In 2009, the team finished 2nd to qualify for the Korean FA Cup again. There were no play-offs during that season.

Over the next few seasons they would finish in or near the bottom half of the table multiple times, and did not play in the Korean FA Cup again until 2012, when all K3 were granted automatic entry.

In 2015, the team relocated to Pyeongchang County and changed their name to Pyeongchang FC. They fared no better and in 2016 they were relegated to the newly created fourth division, K3 League Basic.

Throughout the teams' history, they never managed to progress past the first round of the Korean FA Cup. In 2015, they were automatically entered in to the second round, but failed to progress. Each time they were eliminated by a lower league teams, twice my regional sides and the rest by university sides. Their worst Cup result come in 2018 when Yongin University beat then 7-1.

In 2020, the KFA would merge the semi-professional National League and amateur K3 and K4 leagues. The main criteria for inclusion in the restructured system was financial sustainability, and Pyeongchang FC was one of the teams denied entry. The team initially intended to restructure and enter the 2021 season, but was unable and chose to disband instead.

In 2021, a new team Pyeongchang United FC was established, but they are not recognised as a direct successor, and did not inherit the history of Pyeongchang FC.

== Honours ==
=== Domestic competitions ===
==== League ====
K3 League

- (silver) Runner-up : (1) 2009

== Season by season ==
=== As Gwangju Gwangsan FC ===
Season	Teams	League	Position	Pld	W	D	L	GF	GA	GD	Pts	FA Cup	Notes
2008	16	K3 League (Note: Contradictory reports of the season results exist.)	3rd	29	18	3	8	69	36	+33	57	DNQ	Qualified for championships play-off
2009	17	K3 League	2nd	32	20	4	8	65	25	+40	64	Round 1	—
2010	18	K3 League	6th in Group B	25	11	3	11	42	39	+3	36	Round 1	—
2011	16	K3 Challengers League	7th in Group B	22	4	5	13	29	55	–25	17	DNQ	—
2012	18	K3 Challengers League	6th in Group A	25	8	4	13	47	68	–21	28	DNQ	—
2013	18	K3 Challengers League	8th in Group A	25	6	3	16	27	62	–35	21	Round 1	—
2014	18	K3 Challengers League	8th in Group B	25	6	7	12	38	40	–2	25	Round 1	—

=== As Pyeongchang FC ===
Season	Teams	League	Position	Pld	W	D	L	GF	GA	GD	Pts	FA Cup	Notes
2015	18	K3 League	6th	25	8	2	15	36	46	–10	26	2nd Round	—
2016	20	K3 League	14th	19	5	3	11	18	39	–21	18	1st Round	Relegation
2017	9	K3 Basic (Note: K3 League Basic tables do not seem to exist outside of Wikipedia.)	7th	16	5	3	8	27	29	–2	18	1st Round	—
2018	11	K3 Basic	8th	20	4	6	10	37	51	–14	18	1st Round	—
2019	8	K3 Basic	7th	21	2	4	15	23	66	–43	10	1st Round	—
