= Yangju Citizen FC =

Yangju Citizen FC 양주 시민 축구단
- Full name: Yangju Citizen Football Club 양주 시민 축구단
- Founded: 2007; 19 years ago
- Ground: Godeok Artificial Turf Ground
- Capacity: 5,000
- Chairman: Cho Ju-hyung
- Coach: Park Sung-bae
- League: K3 League
- 2023: K3 League, 15th of 15
- Website: http://cafe.daum.net/k3yj2007
Home colours	Away colours

Yangju Citizen Football Club (양주 시민 축구단) is a South Korean football club based in the city of Yangju, located south of Dongducheon and north of Uijeongbu not far from Seoul. The club is a member of the K3 League, the third tier of league football in South Korea.

== Honours ==
- K3 League
  - Winners: (1) 2008
  - Runners-Up: (1) 2011

=== Season-by-season records ===
Season	Teams	Tier	Placement	Pld	W	D	L	GF	GA	GD	Pts	League Cup	FA Cup	Manager
2007	10	K3 League	7th	18	5	2	11	22	37	–15	17	—	DNQ	
2008	15	K3 League	Champion	29	17	6	6	62	42	+20	57	—	DNQ	
2009	17	K3 League	10th	32	14	6	12	60	45	+15	48	—	First round	
2010	18	K3 League	Semifinal	25	16	3	6	59	41	+18	51	—	DNQ	
2011	16	K3 Challengers League	Runner-up	22	15	5	2	52	28	+24	50	—	First round	
2012	18	K3 Challengers League	3rd in Group B	25	14	4	7	79	51	+28	46	—	Second round	
2013	18	K3 Challengers League	3rd in Group B	16	10	2	4	58	29	+29	32	—	First round	Lee Seung-hee
2014	18	K3 Challengers League	5th in Group B	25	10	5	10	43	46	–3	35	—	Second round	Lee Seung-hee
2015	18	K3 League	Semifinal	25	12	5	8	65	37	+28	41	—	Second round	Lee Seung-hee
2016	20	K3 League	Semifinal	19	12	4	3	46	31	+15	40	—	Third round	Lee Seung-hee
2017	12	K3 Advanced	12th	22	4	4	14	33	47	–14	16	—	Third round	Lee Seung-hee
2018	11	K3 Basic	8th	20	11	5	4	41	19	+22	38	—	Second round	Kim Seong-il
2019	8	K3 Basic	3rd	21	14	6	1	62	19	+43	48	—	First round	Kim Seong-il
2020	16	K3 League	13th	22	6	2	14	17	45	–28	20	—	First round	Hong Seong-yo
2021	15	K3 League	14th	28	4	8	16	17	43	–26	20	—	Quarter-finals	Lee Seung-hee
2022	16	K3 League	15th	28	4	7	17	29	50	-21	19	—	First round	Park Sung-bae

== See also ==
- List of football clubs in South Korea
