= Yongin Citizen FC =

2007–2011 South Korean football club

Yongin Citizen FC 용인 시민 축구단
- Full name: Yongin Citizen Football Club 용인 시민 축구단
- Founded: 2007; 19 years ago
- Dissolved: 2011; 15 years ago
- Ground: Yongin Stadium
Home colours	Away colours

Yongin Citizen Football Club (Korean: 용인 시민 축구단) was a South Korean football club based in the city of Yongin. It was a member of the K3 League, which was then an amateur league and the fourth tier of league football in South Korea, but the club withdrew from the league in 2010 due to financial difficulties.
