= Chungbuk Cheongju FC =

South Korean football club

- Full name: Chungbuk Cheongju Football Club 충북 청주 FC
- Founded: 2002; 24 years ago (as Cheongju Solveig FC); 2023; 3 years ago (as Chungbuk Cheongju FC)
- Ground: Cheongju Sports Complex
- Capacity: 16,280
- Chairman: Kim Hyun-ju
- Manager: Rui Quinta
- League: K League 2
- 2025: K League 2, 12th of 14
- Website: chfc.kr
Home colours	Away colours

Chungbuk Cheongju FC (Korean: 충북 청주 FC), formerly Cheongju FC (청주 FC), is a South Korean football club based in the city of Cheongju that competes in the K League 2, the second tier of South Korean football. The club plays its home games at the Cheongju Sports Complex.

== History ==
The club was founded in 2002 as Cheongju Solveig Football Club, and competed at an amateur level.

In the 2009 season, the club joined the K3 League after changing its name to Cheongju Jikji FC. Before the 2019 season, the club merged with Cheongju City FC.

In 2022, Cheongju FC announced that it would join the professional K League 2 in the 2023 season, and also rebranded as Chungbuk Cheongju FC.

=== Name history ===
- Cheongju Solveig FC (2002–2008)
- Cheongju Jikji FC (2009–2013)
- Cheongju FC (2014–2022)
- Chungbuk Cheongju FC (2023–present)

== Current squad ==
As of 17 November 2026

Note: Flags indicate national team as defined under FIFA eligibility rules; some limited exceptions apply. Players may hold more than one non-FIFA nationality.

No.	Pos.	Nation	Player
1	GK	KOR	No Dong-geon
4	DF	KOR	Cho Yoon-sung
5	MF	KOR	Kim Sun-min (vice-captain)
7	FW	KOR	Baek Sung-dong
8	DF	KOR	Bak Keon-woo
10	FW	KOR	Kim Doo-hyeon (on loan from Jeonbuk Hyundai Motors)
11	FW	COL	Ménder García
13	FW	KOR	Lee Jong-eon
14	FW	KOR	Seo Jae-won
15	DF	KOR	Lee Min-hyung
16	MF	KOR	Heo Seung-chan
17	MF	KOR	Lee Dong-won
18	DF	KOR	Jo Ju-young (vice-captain)
19	FW	KOR	Song Chang-seok
20	DF	KOR	Yun Suk-young (captain)
21	GK	KOR	Cho Sung-hoon

No.	Pos.	Nation	Player
22	FW	KOR	Yang Young-bin
23	GK	KOR	Cho Sung-bin
25	DF	POR	Rafael Bandeira
27	MF	KOR	Min Ji-hoon (on loan from FC Seoul)
31	GK	KOR	Gong Tae-yun
32	GK	KOR	Lee Seung-hwan (on loan from Pohang Steelers)
37	FW	KOR	Lee Yun-hwan
40	DF	KOR	Park Jin-young (on loan from Seoul E-Land)
41	DF	KOR	Kang Eui-bin
42	MF	KOR	Jung Jin-woo
47	MF	KOR	Ju Na-mu
66	DF	KOR	Lee Kang-han (vice-captain)
70	FW	KOR	Lee Dong-jin
80	MF	POR	Francisco Geraldes
99	DF	KOR	Lee Chang-hoon

=== Out on loan ===
Note: Flags indicate national team as defined under FIFA eligibility rules; some limited exceptions apply. Players may hold more than one non-FIFA nationality.

No.	Pos.	Nation	Player
—	DF	KOR	Lim Jun-young (at Gimcheon Sangmu for military service)

== Backroom staff ==
=== Coaching staff ===
- Manager: (Portugal) Rui Quinta
- Assistant manager: (South Korea) Choi Sang-hyun
- Goalkeeping coach: (Portugal) Cândido Rego
- Coach: (South Korea) Kim Byung-suk
- Fitness coach: (South Korea) Kim Yeon-jun

=== Support staff ===
- Data analyst: (South Korea) Kim Seo-gi
- Trainer: (South Korea) Im Seung-hyun
- Interpreter: (South Korea) An Hyun-jin
- Doctors: (South Korea) Kim Young-gyu, (South Korea) Lee Soon-geol, (South Korea) Kang Sang-woo

Source: Official website

== Season-by-season records ==
Season	Teams	Division	Placement	Pld	W	D	L	GF	GA	GD	Pts	Korean Cup
2009	17	K3 League	8th	32	15	6	11	61	47	+14	51	Second round
2010	18	K3 League	3rd of 9 (Group A)	25	13	7	5	47	24	+23	46	First round
2011	18	K3 Challengers League	4th of 9 (Group B)	22	11	7	4	43	25	+18	40	First round
2012	18	K3 Challengers League	2nd of 9 (Group B)	25	14	7	4	72	30	+42	49	Round of 32
2013	18	K3 Challengers League	3rd of 9 (Group A)	25	13	7	5	52	31	+21	46	Second round
2014	18	K3 Challengers League	4th of 9 (Group A)	25	12	6	7	60	38	+22	42	First round
2015	18	K3 League	6th of 9 (Group B)	25	10	4	11	52	51	+1	34	Third round
2016	20	K3 League	15th	19	5	2	12	20	33	–13	17	Second round
2017	12	K3 Advanced	7th	22	7	9	6	18	19	–1	30	Third round
2018	12	K3 Advanced	10th	22	6	2	14	19	37	–18	20	Second round
2019	12	K3 Advanced	8th	22	8	4	10	29	32	–3	28	Round of 16
2020	16	K3 League	10th	22	9	7	6	25	25	0	34	Second round
2021	15	K3 League	11th	30	9	7	12	37	39	–2	34	Third round
2022	16	K3 League	14th	30	7	9	14	21	41	–20	30	Second round
2023	13	K League 2	8th	36	13	13	10	37	42	–5	52	Third round
2024	13	K League 2	10th	36	8	16	12	32	42	–10	40	Round of 16
2025	14	K League 2	12th	39	7	10	22	30	62	–32	31	Second round
