= K3 League =

South Korean association football league

- Organising body: Korea Football Association
- Founded: 2020; 6 years ago
- Country: South Korea
- Number of clubs: 14
- Level on pyramid: 3
- Promotion to: K League 2
- Relegation to: K4 League
- Domestic cup: Korean FA Cup
- Current champions: Siheung City (2026)
- Most championships: Gimhae FC; Siheung City (2 titles each)
- Broadcasters: Coupang Play; YouTube
- Website: kfa.or.kr (in Korean)
- Current: 2026 K3 League

The K3 League (Korean: K3리그) is the third-highest division in the South Korean football league system. It was run as an amateur league until 2019, but was relaunched as a semi-professional league after absorbing the Korea National League in 2020. It is currently contested by 14 clubs in the 2026 season.

== History ==
The Korean National Semi-Professional Football League was founded in 1964 and lasted until it was replaced by the Korea National League in 2003. The National League (K2 League) was established to introduce the promotion and relegation system between semi-professional clubs and K League clubs. However, National League clubs which formed independent federation were reluctant to invest in their professionalization, and the plan was abandoned due to their refusal.

The Korea Football Association (KFA) continued its plan to complete the South Korean football league system. The KFA made its amateur league K3 League in 2007, and introduced promotion and relegation in the amateur K3 League after dividing it into two divisions K3 League Advanced and K3 League Basic in 2017. Meanwhile, the number of National League clubs gradually decreased, while some of them joined second-tier professional league K League 2 (K League Challenge) or were dissolved due to financial problems. The K3 League Advanced and K3 League Basic were relaunched as semi-professional leagues under the name of K3 League and K4 League respectively, and the National League was merged into the newly-developed K3 League.

At present, there is promotion and relegation between the K3 League and K4 League, but clubs cannot be promoted from K3 to the K League 2. However, the KFA has announced plans to unify the K League system, meaning that from the 2027 season onwards, there will be promotion and relegation between the K3 League and K League 2.

== Competition format ==
All participating clubs play home and away season in the K3 League. The championship playoffs were contested by top four clubs of the regular season in 2020 and 2021, but were not held in 2022 onwards. The promotion and relegation system exists between the K3 League and the K4 League, although the number of promoted team(s) and relegated team(s) is different every season.

From 2026, promotion-relegation between K League 2 and K3 League was introduce. The team acquire a K League License will be promoted, while bottom K League 2 team will be relegated. K3 League Champions will face against 17th place of K League 2 in Relegation play-off round.

== Clubs ==
=== Current clubs ===
Team	City	Stadium	Manager	First season	Current spell	Seasons (Note: As of the start of the 2026 season.)	Last title
Busan Transportation Corporation	Busan	Busan Gudeok Stadium	(South Korea) Park Sang-in	2020	2020–	7	—
Changwon FC	Changwon	Changwon Football Center	(South Korea) Choi Kyung-don	2020	2020–	7	2022
Chuncheon FC	Chuncheon	Chuncheon Stadium	(South Korea) Jeong Seon-woo	2020	2023–	5	—
Daejeon Korail	Daejeon	Daejeon Hanbat Sports Complex	(South Korea) Kim Seung-hee	2020	2020–	7	—
Dangjin Citizen	Dangjin	Dangjin Stadium	(South Korea) Han Sang-min	2022	2026–	2	—
FC Gangneung	Gangneung	Gangneung Stadium	(South Korea) Park Moon-young	2020	2020–	7	—
Gyeongju KHNP	Gyeongju	Gyeongju Civic Stadium	(South Korea) Uh Yong-kuk	2020	2020–	7	—
Jeonbuk Hyundai Motors N	Jeonju	Wanju Public Stadium	(South Korea) Ahn Dae-hyeon	2025	2025–	2	—
FC Mokpo	Mokpo	Mokpo International Football Center	(South Korea) Kim Jung-Hyuk	2020	2020–	6	—
Pocheon Citizen	Pocheon	Pocheon Stadium	(South Korea) Kim Jae-hyung	2022	2022–	5	—
Siheung City	Siheung	Jeongwang Sports Park	(South Korea) Lee Seung-hee (caretaker)	2022	2022–	5	2024
Ulsan Citizen	Ulsan	Ulsan Stadium	(South Korea) Yoon Kyun-sang	2021	2021–	6	—
Yangpyeong FC	Yangpyeong	Yongmun Sports Park	(South Korea) Kim Gyeong-bum	2023	2023–	4	—
Yeoju FC	Yeoju	Yeoju Stadium	(South Korea) Oh Ju-po	2024	2024–	3	—

=== Former clubs ===
The following clubs are not in the K3 League as of the 2026 season.

Club	Last season	Reason
Jeonju Citizen	2020	Relegated to K4 League
Pyeongtaek Citizen	2021	Relegated to K4 League
Yangju Citizen	2023	Relegated to K4 League
Daegu FC B	2024	Relegated to K4 League
Gimpo FC	2021	Professionalized and promoted to K League
Cheonan City	2022	Professionalized and promoted to K League
Cheongju FC	2022	Professionalized and promoted to K League
Hwaseong FC	2024	Professionalized and promoted to K League
Gimhae FC	2025	Professionalized and promoted to K League
Paju Citizen	2025	Professionalized and promoted to K League
Gyeongju Citizen	2020	Dissolved

== Champions ==
=== Champions by season ===
Season	Champions	Runners-up
2020	Gimhae FC	Gyeongju KHNP
2021	Gimpo FC	Cheonan City
2022	Changwon City	Paju Citizen
2023	Hwaseong FC	FC Mokpo
2024	Siheung Citizen	Hwaseong FC
2025	Gimhae FC	Siheung Citizen
2026	Siheung Citizen	Pocheon Citizen
2027		

=== Performance by club ===
- Italic, no more in K3 League.

Club	Champions	Runner-up	Seasons won	Seasons runner-up
Siheung Citizen	2	1	2024, 2026	2025
Gimhae FC	2	0	2020, 2025	—
Hwaseong FC	1	1	2023	2024
Gimpo FC	1	0	2021	—
Changwon City	1	0	2022	—
Gyeongju KHNP	0	1	—	2020
Cheonan City	0	1	—	2021
Paju Citizen	0	1	—	2022
FC Mokpo	0	1	—	2023
Pocheon Citizen	0	1	—	2026

== See also ==
- K4 League
- Korea National League
- K3 League (2007–2019)
- South Korean football league system
