= 2011 Challengers Cup =

Tournament details
- Country: South Korea
- Cities: Jecheon, Chungbuk
- Dates: 5–13 August 2011

Final positions
- Champions: Icheon Citizen (1st title)
- Runners-up: Gyeongju Citizen

Tournament statistics
- Matches played: 14
- Goals scored: 47 (3.36 per match)
- Top goal scorer(s): Lee Young-kwang (5 goals)

The 2011 Challengers Cup was the first competition of the Challengers Cup. It featured 15 Challengers League teams, excluding Gwangju Gwangsan.

== Bracket ==
First round
Bucheon FC 1995 (p)	0 (7)
Cheongju Jikji	0 (6)
Jeonju EM	1 (2)
Asan Citizen (p)	1 (4)
Yangju FC	1
FC Pocheon	3
Icheon Citizen	bye
—	—
Cheonan FC	1
Chuncheon FC	0
Yeonggwang FC	1
Seoul United	4
Namyangju United	1
Gyeongju Citizen	4
Seoul FC Martyrs	1
Goyang FC	5

Quarter-finals
Bucheon FC 1995	1
Asan Citizen	2
FC Pocheon	2 (5)
Icheon Citizen (p)	2 (6)
Cheonan FC	2
Seoul United	1
Gyeongju Citizen (p)	1 (4)
Goyang FC	1 (3)

Semi-finals
Asan Citizen	0
Icheon Citizen	5
Cheonan FC	0
Gyeongju Citizen	5

Final
Icheon Citizen (p)	1 (4)
Gyeongju Citizen	1 (3)

== First round ==
The draw for the first round was held on 21 July 2011.

7 August 2011
10:00

Bucheon FC 1995	0–0	Cheongju Jikji
Penalties
Shin Jong-hoon (penalty scored); ? (penalty scored); ? (penalty scored); ? (penalty scored); ? (penalty scored); Jung Hyun-min (penalty scored); Kim Tae-young (penalty scored)	7–6	(penalty scored) ?; (penalty scored) ?; (penalty scored) ?; (penalty scored) ?; (penalty scored) ?; (penalty scored) ?; (penalty missed) ?

Jecheon Football Center 1, Jecheon
Attendance: 150
Referee: Park Byung-jin

7 August 2011
16:00

Jeonju EM	1–1	Asan Citizen
An Min-ho 74'		Seo Man-hee 56'
Penalties
	2–4

Jecheon Football Center 1, Jecheon
Attendance: 100
Referee: Kim Cheol-yong

7 August 2011
16:00

Yangju FC	1–3	FC Pocheon
Yoon Kyung-su 54'; Kim Tae-young (red card) 88'; Shin Young-rok (red card) 88'		Lee Seung-tae 30', 41'; Lee Hoo-seon 45'; Oh Tae-hwan (red card) 88'

Jecheon Bongyang Camp, Jecheon
Attendance: 50
Referee: Mae Ho-young

7 August 2011
10:00

Cheonan FC	1–0	Chuncheon FC
Kim Dong-seok 16' (pen.)

Jecheon Football Center 2, Jecheon
Attendance: 50
Referee: Kim Tae-guk

7 August 2011
16:00

Yeonggwang FC	1–4	Seoul United
Chu Jae-ho 68'		Lee Jung-yong 9'; Kwak Hyo-joon 11', 53'; Koo Tae-hoon 50' (o.g.)

Jecheon Football Center 2, Jecheon
Attendance: 60
Referee: Kwon Ki-gu

7 August 2011
10:00

Namyangju United	1–4	Gyeongju Citizen
Jung Byung-yeol 53'		Han Dong-hyuk 73'; Nam Hyun-sung 82', 90+2'; Choi Jin-seok 90+1'

Jecheon Football Center 3, Jecheon
Attendance: 60
Referee: Jo Hyung-Taek

7 August 2011
16:00

Seoul FC Martyrs	1–5	Goyang FC
Shin Jae-seok 12' (o.g.)		Gong Han-bin 14'; Lee Young-kwang 28', 35', 54', 61'

Jecheon Football Center 3, Jecheon
Attendance: 50
Referee: Lee Hyuk-jae

== Quarter-finals ==
9 August 2011
10:00

Bucheon FC 1995	1–2	Asan Citizen
Kang Woo-ram 17'		Park Sang-joon 34'; Jeon Hee-jae 40'

Jecheon Football Center 1, Jecheon
Attendance: 80
Referee: Ji Seung-min

9 August 2011
16:00

FC Pocheon	2–2	Icheon Citizen
Shin Ok-jin 7'; Kim Sung-ho 77'		Ko Sung-in 24'; Lee Yong-soo 45'
Penalties
	5–6

Jecheon Football Center 1, Jecheon
Attendance: 100
Referee: Kwon Ki-gu

9 August 2011
10:00

Cheonan FC	2–1	Seoul United
Jung Joon-young 67'; Lee Choong-man 80'		Kwak Hyo-joon 3'

Jecheon Football Center 3, Jecheon
Attendance: 50
Referee: Kim Cheol-yong

9 August 2011
16:00

Gyeongju Citizen	1–1	Goyang FC
Jung Ji-woon 8'		Lee Young-kwang 72' (pen.)
Penalties
? (penalty scored); ? (penalty scored); ? (penalty scored); ? (penalty scored)	4–3	(penalty scored) ?; (penalty missed) Shin Ji-cheol; (penalty scored) ?; (penalty scored) ?; (penalty missed) ?

Jecheon Football Center 3, Jecheon
Attendance: 50
Referee: Park Byung-jin

== Semi-finals ==
11 August 2011
10:00

Asan Citizen	0–5	Icheon Citizen
		Ko Sung-in 13', 58'; Kim Seung-cheol 22'; Na Kwang-hyun 29' (pen.); Kim Tae-joon 78' (o.g.)

Jecheon Stadium, Jecheon
Attendance: 100
Referee: Park Byung-jin

11 August 2011
16:00

Cheonan FC	0–5	Gyeongju Citizen
Baek Il-hong (yellow card) 64' (yellow-red card) 65'		Han Dong-hyuk 11'; Choi Jae-nam 22'; Jung Jong-ki 31', 37'; Kim Min-seob 50'

Jecheon Stadium, Jecheon
Attendance: 100
Referee: Kwon Ki-gu

== Final ==
13 August 2011
11:00

Icheon Citizen	1–1 (a.e.t.)	Gyeongju Citizen
Kim Kyung-hwan 5'	Report	Kim Min-sub 44'
Penalties
Na Kwang-hyun (penalty scored); Lee Jin-yong (penalty scored); Lim Hyun-woo (penalty scored); Jeong Joon-ho (penalty missed); Yang Ji-hoon (penalty scored)	4–3	(penalty missed) Lee Seung-min; (penalty scored) Choi Jin-seok; (penalty scored) Jeong Jong-ki; (penalty scored) Ha Seung-min; (penalty missed) Jang Ji-soo

Jecheon Stadium, Jecheon

== See also ==
- 2011 in South Korean football
- 2011 Challengers League
