= 2012 Challengers Cup =

Tournament details
- Country: South Korea
- Cities: Jecheon, Chungbuk
- Dates: 28 July – 4 August 2012

Final positions
- Champions: Icheon Citizen (2nd title)
- Runners-up: Pocheon Citizen

Tournament statistics
- Matches played: 25
- Goals scored: 106 (4.24 per match)
- Top goal scorer: Kim Seong-min

Awards
- Best player: Na Kwang-hyun
- Best goalkeeper: Hwang Se-ha

The 2012 Challengers Cup was the second and last competition of the Challengers Cup, a South Korean football competition. It was contested by 18 Challengers League teams.

== Group stage ==
Group A
Pos	Team	Pld	W	D	L	GF	GA	GD	Pts	GYJ	CHJ	JEM
1	Gyeongju Citizen	2	2	0	0	7	1	+6	6	—	4–1	3–0
2	Cheongju Jikji	2	0	1	1	5	8	−3	1		—	4–4
3	Jeonju EM	2	0	1	1	4	7	−3	1			—

Source: KFA

Group B
Pos	Team	Pld	W	D	L	GF	GA	GD	Pts	POC	YSU	YJC
1	Pocheon Citizen	2	2	0	0	5	0	+5	6	—	1–0	4–0
2	Yesan United	2	1	0	1	4	1	+3	3		—	4–0
3	Yangju Citizen	2	0	0	2	0	8	−8	0			—

Source: KFA

Group C
Pos	Team	Pld	W	D	L	GF	GA	GD	Pts	GOY	NYJ	JCM
1	Goyang Citizen	2	2	0	0	6	3	+3	6	—	3–2	3–1
2	Namyangju United	2	1	0	1	6	5	+1	3		—	4–2
3	Jungnang Chorus Mustang	2	0	0	2	3	7	−4	0			—

Source: KFA

Group D
Pos	Team	Pld	W	D	L	GF	GA	GD	Pts	BUC	SU	CHA
1	Bucheon FC 1995	2	2	0	0	7	1	+6	6	—	4–0	3–1
2	Seoul United	2	1	0	1	3	6	−3	3		—	3–2
3	Cheonan FC	2	0	0	2	3	6	−3	0			—

Source: KFA

Group E
Pos	Team	Pld	W	D	L	GF	GA	GD	Pts	PJC	CHC	YG
1	Paju Citizen	2	2	0	0	6	2	+4	6	—	3–0	3–2
2	Chuncheon FC	2	1	0	1	2	4	−2	3		—	2–1
3	Yeonggwang FC	2	0	0	2	3	5	−2	0			—

Source: KFA

Group F
Pos	Team	Pld	W	D	L	GF	GA	GD	Pts	ICH	GJG	MAR
1	Icheon Citizen	2	2	0	0	10	2	+8	6	—	4–2	6–0
2	Gwangju Gwangsan	2	1	0	1	6	4	+2	3		—	4–0
3	Seoul FC Martyrs	2	0	0	2	0	10	−10	0			—

Source: KFA

== Knockout stage ==
Quarter-finals
A1	Gyeongju Citizen (p)	0 (3)
E1	Paju Citizen	0 (2)
B1	Pocheon Citizen	8
B2	Yesan United	2
C1	Goyang Citizen	1 (3)
F1	Icheon Citizen (p)	1 (5)
D1	Bucheon FC 1995	6
F2	Gwangju Gwangsan	0

Semi-finals
Gyeongju Citizen	0
Pocheon Citizen	1
Icheon Citizen	3
Bucheon FC 1995	1

Final
Pocheon Citizen	0
Icheon Citizen	3

== See also ==
- 2012 in South Korean football
- 2012 Challengers League
