= 2011 in South Korean football =

Football in South Korea
- Season: 2011

Men's football
- K League: Jeonbuk Hyundai Motors
- National League: Hyundai Mipo Dockyard
- Challengers League: Gyeongju Citizen
- Korean FA Cup: Seongnam Ilhwa Chunma
- Korean League Cup: Ulsan Hyundai

Women's football
- WK League: Goyang Daekyo Kangaroos

This article shows a summary of the 2011 football season in South Korea.

== National teams ==
=== AFC Asian Cup ===
After beating Iran in extra time of the quarter-final match, South Korea once again played extra time in the semi-finals against Japan. In this extra time, Hajime Hosogai who moved into the penalty area before Keisuke Honda kicked a penalty scored a controversial goal from the rebound. South Korea scored the equaliser after the misfortune, but lost on penalties.

10 January Group C	South Korea	2–1	Bahrain	Doha, Qatar
19:15	Koo Ja-cheol 40', 52'	Report	Aaish 85' (pen.)	Stadium: Al Gharafa Stadium; Attendance: 6,669; Referee: Abdullah Al Hilali (Oman)

14 January Group C	Australia	1–1	South Korea	Doha, Qatar
16:15	Jedinak 62'	Report	Koo Ja-cheol 24'	Stadium: Al Gharafa Stadium; Attendance: 15,526; Referee: Abdulrahman Abdou (Qatar)

18 January Group C	South Korea	4–1	India	Doha, Qatar
16:15	Ji Dong-won 6', 23'; Koo Ja-cheol 9'; Son Heung-min 81'	Report	Chhetri 12' (pen.)	Stadium: Al Gharafa Stadium; Attendance: 11,366; Referee: Khalil Al Ghamdi (Saudi Arabia)

Group C table
Pos	Team	Pld	W	D	L	GF	GA	GD	Pts	Qualification
1	Australia	3	2	1	0	6	1	+5	7	Advance to knockout stage
2	South Korea	3	2	1	0	7	3	+4	7	Advance to knockout stage
3	Bahrain	3	1	0	2	6	5	+1	3	
4	India	3	0	0	3	3	13	−10	0	

22 January Quarter-finals	Iran	0–1 (a.e.t.)	South Korea	Doha, Qatar
19:25		Report	Yoon Bit-garam 105'	Stadium: Qatar SC Stadium; Attendance: 7,111; Referee: Ravshan Irmatov (Uzbekistan)

25 January Semi-finals	Japan	2–2 (a.e.t.) (3–0 p)	South Korea	Doha, Qatar
16:25	Maeda 36'; Hosogai 97'	Report	Ki Sung-yueng 23' (pen.); Hwang Jae-won 120'	Stadium: Al-Gharafa Stadium; Attendance: 16,171; Referee: Khalil Al Ghamdi (Saudi Arabia)
	Penalties
	K. Honda (penalty scored); Okazaki (penalty scored); Nagatomo (penalty missed); Konno (penalty scored)		(penalty missed) Koo Ja-cheol; (penalty missed) Lee Yong-rae; (penalty missed) Hong Jeong-ho

28 January Third place match	Uzbekistan	2–3	South Korea	Doha, Qatar
18:00	Geynrikh 45' (pen.), 53'	Report	Koo Ja-cheol 18'; Ji Dong-won 28', 39'	Stadium: Jassim Bin Hamad Stadium; Attendance: 8,199; Referee: Abdul Malik Bashir (Singapore)

=== FIFA World Cup qualification ===
2 September AFC third round, Group B	South Korea	6–0	Lebanon	Goyang, South Korea
20:00 UTC+09:00	Park Chu-young 8', 45+1', 67'; Ji Dong-won 66', 85'; Kim Jung-woo 85'	Report		Stadium: Goyang Stadium; Attendance: 37,655; Referee: Abdul Malik Bashir (Singapore)

6 September AFC third round, Group B	Kuwait	1–1	South Korea	Kuwait City, Kuwait
20:00 UTC+03:00	Fadel 53'	Report	Park Chu-young 8'	Stadium: Peace and Friendship Stadium; Attendance: 20,000; Referee: Mohsen Torky (Iran)

11 October AFC third round, Group B	South Korea	2–1	United Arab Emirates	Suwon, South Korea
20:00 UTC+09:00	Park Chu-young 50'; Al Kamali 63' (o.g.)	Report	Matar 90+1'	Stadium: Suwon World Cup Stadium; Attendance: 28,689; Referee: Tan Hai (China)

11 November AFC third round, Group B	United Arab Emirates	0–2	South Korea	Dubai, United Arab Emirates
16:45 UTC+4		Report	Lee Keun-ho 88'; Park Chu-young 90+3'	Stadium: Al-Rashid Stadium; Attendance: 8,272; Referee: Ravshan Irmatov (Uzbekistan)

15 November AFC third round, Group B	Lebanon	2–1	South Korea	Beirut, Lebanon
14:30 UTC+2	Al Saadi 5'; Ali Atwi 31' (pen.)	Report	Koo Ja-cheol 21' (pen.)	Stadium: Camille Chamoun Sports City Stadium; Attendance: 35,000; Referee: Khalil Al Ghamdi (Saudi Arabia)

=== Summer Olympics qualification ===
19 June AFC second round	South Korea	3–1	Jordan	Seoul, South Korea
15:00 KST (UTC+09)	Kim Tae-hwan 54'; Yoon Bit-garam 75' (pen.); Kim Dong-sub 85'		Za'tara 45'	Stadium: Seoul World Cup Stadium; Attendance: 35,224; Referee: Tan Hai (China PR)

23 June AFC second round	Jordan	1–1	South Korea	Amman, Jordan
18:00 AST (UTC+03)	Al-Daradreh 42'		Hong Chul 71'	Stadium: Amman International Stadium; Attendance: 1,350; Referee: Abdul Malik Bin Abdul Bashir (Singapore)

21 September AFC third round, Group A	South Korea	2–0	Oman	Changwon, South Korea
20:00 KST (UTC+09)	Yoon Bit-garam 23'; Kim Bo-kyung 73'			Stadium: Changwon Football Center; Attendance: 13,704; Referee: Ravshan Irmatov (Uzbekistan)

23 November AFC third round, Group A	Qatar	1–1	South Korea	Doha, Qatar
19:00 UTC+03	Majid 43' (pen.)	Report	Kim Hyun-sung 68'	Stadium: Al-Sadd Stadium; Attendance: 5,051; Referee: Nawaf Shukralla (Bahrain)

27 November AFC third round, Group A	South Korea	1–0	Saudi Arabia	Seoul, South Korea
14:00 KST (UTC+09)	Cho Young-cheol 33' (pen.)	Report		Stadium: Seoul World Cup Stadium; Attendance: 27,224; Referee: Yuichi Nishimura (Japan)

=== Friendlies ===
==== Senior team ====
9 February	Turkey	0–0	South Korea	Trabzon, Turkey
20:00 UTC+2		Report		Stadium: Hüseyin Avni Aker Stadium; Referee: Sergii Boyko (Ukraine)

25 March	South Korea	4–0	Honduras	Seoul, South Korea
20:00 UTC+9	Lee Jung-soo 28'; Kim Jung-woo 43'; Park Chu-young 82'; Lee Keun-ho 90+2'	Report		Stadium: Seoul World Cup Stadium; Attendance: 31,224; Referee: Ryuji Sato (Japan)

3 June	South Korea	2–1	Serbia	Seoul, South Korea
20:00 UTC+9	Park Chu-young 10'; Kim Young-gwon 53'	Report	Petrović 87'	Stadium: Seoul World Cup Stadium; Attendance: 40,876; Referee: Ali Al-Badwawi (United Arab Emirates)

7 June	South Korea	2–1	Ghana	Jeonju, South Korea
20:00 UTC+9	Ji Dong-won 10'; Koo Ja-cheol 90'	Report	Gyan 62'	Stadium: Jeonju World Cup Stadium; Attendance: 41,271; Referee: Ravshan Irmatov (Uzbekistan)

10 August	Japan	3–0	South Korea	Sapporo, Japan
19:30 JST	Kagawa 35', 55'; Honda 53'	Report		Stadium: Sapporo Dome; Attendance: 38,263; Referee: Ravshan Irmatov (Uzbekistan)

7 October	South Korea	2–2 (Note: The friendly match against Poland was not considered to be an official match organized by FIFA because South Korea used seven substitutes in the match. Under the FIFA regulations, a maximum of six substitutes may be used in an official national team match.)	Poland	Seoul, South Korea
20:00 UTC+9	Park Chu-young 65', 76'	Report	Lewandowski 29'; Błaszczykowski 82'	Stadium: Seoul World Cup Stadium; Attendance: 33,225; Referee: Nawaf Shukralla (Bahrain)

==== Under-23 team ====
27 March	South Korea	1–0	China	Ulsan, South Korea
15:00 KST (UTC+09)	Kim Dong-sub 13'			Stadium: Ulsan Munsu Football Stadium; Attendance: 31,274; Referee: Sato Ryuji (Japan)

1 June	South Korea	3–1	Oman	Gangneung, South Korea
19:00 KST (UTC+09)	Hwang Do-yeon 47'; Bae Chun-suk 57', 81'		Al-Hadhri 23'	Stadium: Gangneung Stadium; Attendance: 18,729; Referee: Tan Hai (China PR)

7 October	South Korea	5–1	Uzbekistan	Seoul, South Korea
17:30 KST (UTC+09)	Kim Tae-hwan 2'; Yun Il-lok 16'; Park Jong-woo 33'; Baek Sung-dong 61'; Park Yong-ji 67'		Abdukhaliqov 55'	Stadium: Seoul World Cup Stadium; Attendance: 33,225; Referee: Apisit Aonrak (Thailand)

== Leagues ==
=== K League ===
==== Regular season ====
Pos	Team	Pld	W	D	L	GF	GA	GD	Pts	Qualification
1	Jeonbuk Hyundai Motors	30	18	9	3	67	32	+35	63	Qualification for K League playoffs final
2	Pohang Steelers	30	17	8	5	59	33	+26	59	Qualification for K League playoffs semi-final
3	FC Seoul	30	16	7	7	56	38	+18	55	Qualification for K League playoffs first round
4	Suwon Samsung Bluewings	30	17	4	9	51	33	+18	55	Qualification for K League playoffs first round
5	Busan IPark	30	13	7	10	49	43	+6	46	Qualification for K League playoffs first round
6	Ulsan Hyundai	30	13	7	10	33	29	+4	46	Qualification for K League playoffs first round
7	Jeonnam Dragons	30	11	10	9	33	29	+4	43	
8	Gyeongnam FC	30	12	6	12	41	40	+1	42	
9	Jeju United	30	10	10	10	44	45	−1	40	
10	Seongnam Ilhwa Chunma	30	9	8	13	43	47	−4	35	Qualification for Champions League group stage (Note: Qualified as champions of FA Cup.)
11	Gwangju FC	30	9	8	13	32	43	−11	35	
12	Daegu FC	30	8	9	13	35	46	−11	33	
13	Incheon United	30	6	14	10	31	40	−9	32	
14	Sangju Sangmu Phoenix	30	7	8	15	36	53	−17	29	
15	Daejeon Citizen	30	6	9	15	31	59	−28	27	
16	Gangwon FC	30	3	6	21	14	45	−31	15	

Source: K League
Rules for classification: 1) Points; 2) Goal difference; 3) Goals scored

==== Championship playoffs ====
First round
3	FC Seoul	1
6	Ulsan Hyundai	3
4	Suwon Samsung Bluewings	1
5	Busan IPark	0

Second round
Ulsan Hyundai (p)	1 (3)
Suwon Samsung Bluewings	1 (1)

Semifinal
2	Pohang Steelers	0
Ulsan Hyundai	1

Final
1	Jeonbuk Hyundai Motors	2	2	4
Ulsan Hyundai	1	1	2

==== Final table ====
Pos	Team	Qualification
1	Jeonbuk Hyundai Motors (C)	Qualification for Champions League group stage
2	Ulsan Hyundai	Qualification for Champions League group stage
3	Pohang Steelers	Qualification for Champions League playoff round
4	Suwon Samsung Bluewings	
5	FC Seoul	
6	Busan IPark	

Source: RSSSF
(C) Champion

=== Korea National League ===
==== Regular season ====
Pos	Team	Pld	W	D	L	GF	GA	GD	Pts	Qualification
1	Hyundai Mipo Dockyard (C)	26	17	2	7	53	34	+19	53	Qualification for playoffs final
2	Goyang KB Kookmin Bank	26	13	8	5	37	25	+12	47	Qualification for playoffs semi-final
3	Gangneung City	26	12	10	4	40	25	+15	46	Qualification for playoffs first round
4	Busan Transportation Corporation	26	11	8	7	29	27	+2	41	Qualification for playoffs first round
5	Changwon City	26	11	7	8	37	36	+1	40	Qualification for playoffs first round
6	Incheon Korail	26	11	6	9	29	23	+6	39	Qualification for playoffs first round
7	Suwon City	26	8	11	7	28	23	+5	35	
8	Daejeon KHNP	26	9	8	9	40	38	+2	35	
9	Cheonan City	26	9	8	9	31	31	0	35	
10	Gimhae City	26	10	3	13	39	44	−5	33	
11	Yongin City	26	5	11	10	22	32	−10	26	
12	Ansan Hallelujah	26	5	8	13	25	42	−17	23	
13	Mokpo City	26	5	6	15	25	36	−11	21	
14	Chungju Hummel	26	5	6	15	25	44	−19	21	

Source: Korea National League (in Korean)
Rules for classification: 1) Points; 2) Goal difference; 3) Goals scored
(C) Champions

==== Championship playoffs ====
First round
3	Gangneung City	3
6	Incheon Korail	2
4	Busan Transportation Corporation	0
5	Changwon City	1

Second round
Gangneung City	1
Changwon City	3

Semifinal
2	Goyang KB Kookmin Bank (a.e.t.)	3
Changwon City	2

Final
1	Hyundai Mipo Dockyard	1	1	2
Goyang KB Kookmin Bank	1	0	1

=== Challengers League ===
==== Group A ====
Pos	Team	Pld	W	D	L	GF	GA	GD	Pts	Qualification
1	Yangju Citizen	22	15	5	2	52	28	+24	50	Qualification for playoffs
2	Gyeongju Citizen	22	13	6	3	57	24	+33	45	Qualification for playoffs
3	Bucheon FC 1995	22	8	5	9	37	31	+6	29	Qualification for FA Cup first round
4	Jeonju EM	22	7	8	7	28	34	−6	29	Qualification for FA Cup first round
5	Seoul United	22	7	5	10	44	46	−2	26	Qualification for FA Cup first round
6	Namyangju United	22	5	5	12	41	57	−16	20	
7	Yeonggwang FC	22	4	3	15	26	51	−25	15	
8	Asan Citizen	22	3	6	13	37	72	−35	15	

Source: KFA Soccerway
Rules for classification: 1) Points; 2) Goal difference; 3) Goals scored

==== Group B ====
Pos	Team	Pld	W	D	L	GF	GA	GD	Pts	Qualification
1	Icheon Citizen	22	15	4	3	75	26	+49	49	Qualification for playoffs
2	FC Pocheon	22	14	6	2	49	22	+27	48	Qualification for playoffs
3	Chuncheon FC	22	13	4	5	38	23	+15	43	Qualification for FA Cup first round
4	Cheongju FC	22	11	7	4	43	25	+18	40	Qualification for FA Cup first round
5	Seoul FC Martyrs	22	9	3	10	43	56	−13	30	Qualification for FA Cup first round
6	Cheonan FC	22	6	2	14	38	54	−16	20	
7	Gwangju Gwangsan	22	4	5	13	29	56	−27	17	
8	Goyang Citizen	22	3	4	15	24	56	−32	13	

Source: KFA Soccerway
Rules for classification: 1) Points; 2) Goal difference; 3) Goals scored

==== Championship playoffs ====
Semi-finals
Yangju Citizen (p)	1 (4)
FC Pocheon	1 (3)
Icheon Citizen	0 (2)
Gyeongju Citizen (p)	0 (4)

Final
Yangju Citizen	1	2	3
Gyeongju Citizen	1	3	4

==== Final table ====
Pos	Team	Qualification
1	Gyeongju Citizen (C)	Qualification for the FA Cup second round
2	Yangju Citizen	Qualification for the FA Cup first round
3	Icheon Citizen	Qualification for the FA Cup first round
4	FC Pocheon	Qualification for the FA Cup first round

Source: RSSSF
(C) Champion

=== WK League ===
==== Regular season ====
Pos	Team	Pld	W	D	L	GF	GA	GD	Pts	Qualification
1	Goyang Daekyo Noonnoppi (C)	21	19	1	1	64	16	+48	58	Qualification for playoffs final
2	Incheon Hyundai Steel Red Angels	21	12	5	4	37	18	+19	41	Qualification for playoffs semi-final
3	Suwon FMC	21	12	4	5	39	21	+18	40	Qualification for playoffs semi-final
4	Busan Sangmu	21	11	2	8	30	32	−2	35	
5	Chungnam Ilhwa Chunma	21	8	3	10	24	35	−11	27	
6	Seoul City Amazones	21	5	9	7	19	26	−7	24	
7	Jeonbuk KSPO	21	1	3	17	17	46	−29	6	
8	Chungbuk Sportstoto	21	1	3	17	13	49	−36	6	

Source: Soccerway
Rules for classification: 1) Points; 2) Goal difference; 3) Goals scored
(C) Champions

==== Championship playoffs ====
Semi-final			Final
			1	Goyang Daekyo Noonnoppi	2	3	5
2	Incheon Hyundai Steel Red Angels (a.e.t.)	2		Incheon Hyundai Steel Red Angels	2	1	3
3	Suwon FMC	1

== Domestic cups ==
=== Korean FA Cup ===
Round of 32
Pohang Steelers	2
Daejeon KHNP	0
Daegu FC	2
Hyundai Mipo Dockyard (a.e.t.)	3
Gyeongnam FC	1
Busan Transportation Corporation	2
FC Seoul	4
Yongin City	0
Incheon United	2
Yonsei University	1
Seongnam Ilhwa Chunma	3
Mokpo City	0
Jeonbuk Hyundai Motors	2
Kyung Hee University	1
Busan IPark	2
Cheonan City	1
Ulsan Hyundai	1
Ansan Hallelujah	0
Sangju Sangmu Phoenix (a.e.t.)	2
Gangneung City	1
Gangwon FC (p)	0 (4)
Chungju Hummel	0 (3)
Daejeon Citizen	3
Gimhae City	0
Gwangju FC	1
Suwon City (a.e.t.)	2
Suwon Samsung Bluewings	3
FC Pocheon	1
Jeonnam Dragons	1
Konkuk University	0
Jeju United	4
Goyang KB Kookmin Bank	2

Round of 16
Pohang Steelers	1
Hyundai Mipo Dockyard	0
Busan Transportation Corporation	0
FC Seoul	1
Incheon United	0
Seongnam Ilhwa Chunma	2
Jeonbuk Hyundai Motors	1
Busan IPark	2
Ulsan Hyundai (a.e.t.)	2
Sangju Sangmu Phoenix	1
Gangwon FC (p)	1 (4)
Daejeon Citizen	1 (3)
Suwon City	0
Suwon Samsung Bluewings	1
Jeonnam Dragons (a.e.t.)	1
Jeju United	0

Quarter-finals
Pohang Steelers (a.e.t.)	4
FC Seoul	2
Seongnam Ilhwa Chunma	2
Busan IPark	1
Ulsan Hyundai	3
Gangwon FC	0
Suwon Samsung Bluewings	1
Jeonnam Dragons	0

Semi-finals
24 August – Seongnam
Pohang Steelers	0
Seongnam Ilhwa Chunma	3
24 August – Suwon
Ulsan Hyundai	2
Suwon Samsung Bluewings (a.e.t.)	3

Final
15 October – Seongnam
Seongnam Ilhwa Chunma	1
Suwon Samsung Bluewings	0

=== Korean League Cup ===
==== Group stage ====
Group A
Pos	Team	Pld	Pts
1	Pohang Steelers	5	12
2	Gyeongnam FC	5	10
3	Seongnam Ilhwa Chunma	5	8
4	Incheon United	5	5
5	Daegu FC	5	5
6	Daejeon Citizen	5	1

Source: RSSSF

Group B
Pos	Team	Pld	Pts
1	Busan IPark	5	12
2	Ulsan Hyundai	5	12
3	Jeonnam Dragons	5	10
4	Gangwon FC	5	4
5	Sangju Sangmu Phoenix	5	3
6	Gwangju FC	5	3

Source: RSSSF

==== Knockout stage ====
Quarter-finals
B2	Ulsan Hyundai	4
CL	Jeonbuk Hyundai Motors	1
A2	Gyeongnam FC	1
CL	FC Seoul	0
A1	Pohang Steelers	1
B1	Busan IPark	2
CL	Jeju United	0 (2)
CL	Suwon Samsung Bluewings (p)	0 (4)

Semi-finals
Ulsan Hyundai	4
Gyeongnam FC	2
Busan IPark	2
Suwon Samsung Bluewings	1

Final
Ulsan Hyundai	3
Busan IPark	2

=== Korea National League Championship ===
==== Group stage ====
Group A
Pos	Team	Pld	Pts
1	Mokpo City	2	4
2	Cheonan City	2	3
3	Busan Transportation Corporation	2	1

Source: Report

Group B
Pos	Team	Pld	Pts
1	Incheon Korail	3	6
2	Hyundai Mipo Dockyard	3	4
3	Suwon City	3	4
4	Chungju Hummel	3	3

Source: Report

Group C
Pos	Team	Pld	Pts
1	Korean Police	2	4
2	Changwon City	2	3
3	Gimhae City	2	1

Source: Report

Group D
Pos	Team	Pld	Pts
1	Gangneung City	3	5
2	Yongin City	3	4
3	Goyang KB Kookmin Bank	3	4
4	Daejeon KHNP	3	3

Source: Report

==== Knockout stage ====
Quarter-finals
Mokpo City	1
Changwon City	2
Incheon Korail (p)	0 (4)
Yongin City	0 (3)
Korean Police	1
Cheonan City	0
Gangneung City	2 (3)
Hyundai Mipo Dockyard (p)	2 (4)

Semi-finals
Changwon City (a.e.t.)	3
Incheon Korail	2
Korean Police	0
Hyundai Mipo Dockyard	1

Final
Changwon City	0
Hyundai Mipo Dockyard	3

=== Challengers Cup ===
First round
Bucheon FC 1995 (p)	0 (7)
Cheongju Jikji	0 (6)
Jeonju EM	1 (2)
Asan Citizen (p)	1 (4)
Yangju FC	1
FC Pocheon	3
Icheon Citizen	bye
—	—
Cheonan FC	1
Chuncheon FC	0
Yeonggwang FC	1
Seoul United	4
Namyangju United	1
Gyeongju Citizen	4
Seoul FC Martyrs	1
Goyang FC	5

Quarter-finals
Bucheon FC 1995	1
Asan Citizen	2
FC Pocheon	2 (5)
Icheon Citizen (p)	2 (6)
Cheonan FC	2
Seoul United	1
Gyeongju Citizen (p)	1 (4)
Goyang FC	1 (3)

Semi-finals
Asan Citizen	0
Icheon Citizen	5
Cheonan FC	0
Gyeongju Citizen	5

Final
Icheon Citizen (p)	1 (4)
Gyeongju Citizen	1 (3)

== International cups ==
=== AFC Champions League ===
Team	Result	Round	Aggregate	Score	Venue	Opponent
FC Seoul	Quarter-finals	Group F	Winners	1–0	Away	(United Arab Emirates) Al-Ain
FC Seoul	Quarter-finals	Group F	Winners	3–0	Home	(United Arab Emirates) Al-Ain
FC Seoul	Quarter-finals	Group F	Winners	3–0	Home	(China) Hangzhou Greentown
FC Seoul	Quarter-finals	Group F	Winners	1–1	Away	(China) Hangzhou Greentown
FC Seoul	Quarter-finals	Group F	Winners	1–1	Away	(Japan) Nagoya Grampus
FC Seoul	Quarter-finals	Group F	Winners	0–2	Home	(Japan) Nagoya Grampus
FC Seoul	Quarter-finals	Round of 16	3–0	3–0	—	(Japan) Kashima Antlers
FC Seoul	Quarter-finals	Quarter-finals	2–3	1–3	Away	(Saudi Arabia) Al-Ittihad
FC Seoul	Quarter-finals	Quarter-finals	2–3	1–0	Home	(Saudi Arabia) Al-Ittihad
Jeju United	Group stage	Group E	Third place	0–1	Home	(China) Tianjin TEDA
Jeju United	Group stage	Group E	Third place	0–3	Away	(China) Tianjin TEDA
Jeju United	Group stage	Group E	Third place	2–1	Away	(Australia) Melbourne Victory
Jeju United	Group stage	Group E	Third place	1–1	Home	(Australia) Melbourne Victory
Jeju United	Group stage	Group E	Third place	2–1	Home	(Japan) Gamba Osaka
Jeju United	Group stage	Group E	Third place	1–3	Away	(Japan) Gamba Osaka
Jeonbuk Hyundai Motors	Runners-up	Group G	Winners	1–0	Home	(China) Shandong Luneng
Jeonbuk Hyundai Motors	Runners-up	Group G	Winners	2–1	Away	(China) Shandong Luneng
Jeonbuk Hyundai Motors	Runners-up	Group G	Winners	4–0	Away	(Indonesia) Arema
Jeonbuk Hyundai Motors	Runners-up	Group G	Winners	6–0	Home	(Indonesia) Arema
Jeonbuk Hyundai Motors	Runners-up	Group G	Winners	0–1	Away	(Japan) Cerezo Osaka
Jeonbuk Hyundai Motors	Runners-up	Group G	Winners	1–0	Home	(Japan) Cerezo Osaka
Jeonbuk Hyundai Motors	Runners-up	Round of 16	3–0	3–0	—	(China) Tianjin TEDA
Jeonbuk Hyundai Motors	Runners-up	Quarter-finals	9–5	3–4	Away	(Japan) Cerezo Osaka
Jeonbuk Hyundai Motors	Runners-up	Quarter-finals	9–5	6–1	Home	(Japan) Cerezo Osaka
Jeonbuk Hyundai Motors	Runners-up	Semi-finals	5–3	3–2	Away	(Saudi Arabia) Al-Ittihad
Jeonbuk Hyundai Motors	Runners-up	Semi-finals	5–3	2–1	Home	(Saudi Arabia) Al-Ittihad
Jeonbuk Hyundai Motors	Runners-up	Final	2–2 (2–4 p)	2–2 (a.e.t.)	—	(Qatar) Al-Sadd
Suwon Samsung Bluewings	Semi-finals	Group H	Winners	0–0	Away	(Australia) Sydney FC
Suwon Samsung Bluewings	Semi-finals	Group H	Winners	3–1	Home	(Australia) Sydney FC
Suwon Samsung Bluewings	Semi-finals	Group H	Winners	4–0	Home	(China) Shanghai Shenhua
Suwon Samsung Bluewings	Semi-finals	Group H	Winners	3–0	Away	(China) Shanghai Shenhua
Suwon Samsung Bluewings	Semi-finals	Group H	Winners	1–1	Home	(Japan) Kashima Antlers
Suwon Samsung Bluewings	Semi-finals	Group H	Winners	1–1	Away	(Japan) Kashima Antlers
Suwon Samsung Bluewings	Semi-finals	Round of 16	2–0	2–0	—	(Japan) Nagoya Grampus
Suwon Samsung Bluewings	Semi-finals	Quarter-finals	3–2	1–1	Home	(Iran) Zob Ahan
Suwon Samsung Bluewings	Semi-finals	Quarter-finals	3–2	2–1 (a.e.t.)	Away	(Iran) Zob Ahan
Suwon Samsung Bluewings	Semi-finals	Semi-finals	1–2	0–2	Home	(Qatar) Al-Sadd
Suwon Samsung Bluewings	Semi-finals	Semi-finals	1–2	1–0	Away	(Qatar) Al-Sadd

== See also ==
- Football in South Korea
