= 2012 in South Korean football =

Football in South Korea
- Season: 2012

Men's football
- K League: FC Seoul
- National League: Incheon Korail
- National League: Incheon Korail
- Challengers League: Pocheon Citizen
- Korean FA Cup: Pohang Steelers

Women's football
- WK League: Goyang Daekyo Noonnoppi

This article shows a summary of the 2012 football season in South Korea. South Korea won a bronze medal in the Olympic football tournament, becoming the second Asian country to win a medal in the Olympic football.

== National teams ==
=== FIFA World Cup qualification ===
29 February AFC third round, Group B	South Korea	2–0	Kuwait	Seoul, South Korea
21:00 UTC+9	Lee Dong-gook 65'; Lee Keun-ho 71'	Report		Stadium: Seoul World Cup Stadium; Attendance: 46,551; Referee: Yuichi Nishimura (Japan)

AFC third round, Group B table
Pos	Team	Pld	W	D	L	GF	GA	GD	Pts	Qualification
1	South Korea	6	4	1	1	14	4	+10	13	Advance to AFC fourth round
2	Lebanon	6	3	1	2	10	14	−4	10	Advance to AFC fourth round
3	Kuwait	6	2	2	2	8	9	−1	8	
4	United Arab Emirates	6	1	0	5	9	14	−5	3	

Source: RSSSF

8 June AFC fourth round, Group A	Qatar	1–4	South Korea	Doha, Qatar
19:15 UTC+3	Ahmed 22'	Report	Lee Keun-ho 26', 80'; Kwak Tae-hwi 55'; Kim Shin-wook 64'	Stadium: Jassim Bin Hamad Stadium; Attendance: 10,730; Referee: Ali Al-Badawi (United Arab Emirates)

12 June AFC fourth round, Group A	South Korea	3–0	Lebanon	Goyang, South Korea
20:00 UTC+9	Kim Bo-kyung 30', 48'; Koo Ja-cheol 90'	Report		Stadium: Goyang Stadium; Attendance: 36,756; Referee: Masaaki Toma (Japan)

11 September AFC fourth round, Group A	Uzbekistan	2–2	South Korea	Tashkent, Uzbekistan
18:00	Ki Sung-yueng 13' (o.g.); Sanjar Tursunov 59'	Report	Artyom Filiposyan 44' (o.g.); Lee Dong-gook 55'	Stadium: Pakhtakor Markaziy Stadium; Attendance: 34.000; Referee: Benjamin Williams (Australia)

16 October AFC fourth round, Group A	Iran	1–0	South Korea	Tehran, Iran
20:00	Nekounam 75'	Report		Stadium: Azadi Stadium; Attendance: 100,000; Referee: Abdul Maric (Singapore)

=== Summer Olympics qualification ===
5 February AFC third round, Group A	Saudi Arabia	1–1	South Korea	Dammam, Saudi Arabia
20:35 UTC+03	Khudari 60'	Report	Kim Bo-kyung 90+1'	Stadium: Prince Mohamed bin Fahd Stadium; Attendance: 1,315; Referee: Ben Williams (Australia)

22 February AFC third round, Group A	Oman	0–3	South Korea	Muscat, Oman
18:30 UTC+04		Report	Nam Tae-hee 1'; Kim Hyun-sung 68'; Baek Sung-dong 72'	Stadium: Sultan Qaboos Sports Complex; Attendance: 10,000; Referee: Alireza Faghani (Iran)

14 March AFC third round, Group A	South Korea	0–0	Qatar	Seoul, South Korea
20:00 UTC+09		Report		Stadium: Seoul World Cup Stadium; Attendance: 23,327; Referee: Valentin Kovalenko (Uzbekistan)

AFC third round, Group A table
Pos	Team	Pld	W	D	L	GF	GA	GD	Pts	Qualification
1	South Korea	6	3	3	0	8	2	+6	12	Qualification for Summer Olympics
2	Oman	6	2	2	2	8	8	0	8	Advance to AFC fourth round
3	Qatar	6	1	4	1	6	8	−2	7	
4	Saudi Arabia	6	0	3	3	4	8	−4	3	

=== Summer Olympics ===
26 July Group B	Mexico	0–0	South Korea	Newcastle, United Kingdom
14:30 GMT		Report		Stadium: St James' Park; Attendance: 15,748; Referee: Slim Jedidi (Tunisia)

29 July Group B	South Korea	2–1	Switzerland	Coventry, United Kingdom
17:15 GMT	Park Chu-young 57'; Kim Bo-kyung 64'	Report	Emeghara 60'	Stadium: City of Coventry Stadium; Attendance: 30,114; Referee: Raúl Orosco (Bolivia)

1 August Group B	South Korea	0–0	Gabon	London, United Kingdom
17:00 GMT		Report		Stadium: Wembley Stadium; Attendance: 76,927; Referee: Pavel Královec (Czech Republic)

Group B table
Pos	Team	Pld	W	D	L	GF	GA	GD	Pts	Qualification
1	Mexico	3	2	1	0	3	0	+3	7	Advance to knockout stage
2	South Korea	3	1	2	0	2	1	+1	5	Advance to knockout stage
3	Gabon	3	0	2	1	1	3	−2	2	
4	Switzerland	3	0	1	2	2	4	−2	1	

Source: FIFA
Rules for classification: Group stage tiebreakers

4 August Quarter-finals	Great Britain	1–1 (a.e.t.) (4–5 p)	South Korea	Cardiff, United Kingdom
14:30 GMT	Ramsey 36' (pen.)	Report	Ji Dong-won 29'	Stadium: Millennium Stadium, Cardiff; Attendance: 70,171; Referee: Wilmar Roldán (Colombia)
	Penalties
	Ramsey (penalty scored); Cleverley (penalty scored); Dawson (penalty scored); Giggs (penalty scored); Sturridge (penalty missed)		(penalty scored) Koo Ja-cheol; (penalty scored) Baek Sung-dong; (penalty scored) Hwang Seok-ho; (penalty scored) Park Jong-woo; (penalty scored) Ki Sung-yueng

7 August Semi-finals	South Korea	0–3	Brazil	Manchester, United Kingdom
14:30 GMT		Report	Monteiro 39'; Damião 57', 64'	Stadium: Old Trafford, Manchester; Attendance: 69,389; Referee: Pavel Královec (Czech Republic)

10 August Bronze medal match	Japan	0–2	South Korea	Cardiff, United Kingdom
14:30 GMT		Report	Park Chu-young 39'; Koo Ja-cheol 57'	Stadium: Millennium Stadium, Cardiff; Attendance: 56,393; Referee: Ravshan Irmatov (Uzbekistan)

=== AFC U-22 Championship qualification ===
23 June Group G	Malaysia	2–3	South Korea	Yangon, Myanmar
15:15 MST (UTC+09)	Arasu 8', 62'	Report	Kim Hyun-hun 13'; Park Kwang-il 32'; Jeong Jong-hee 34'	Stadium: Thuwunna Stadium, Yangon; Attendance: 1,500; Referee: Ali Sabbagh (Lebanon)

25 June Group G	South Korea	8–1	Chinese Taipei	Yangon, Myanmar
15:15 MST (UTC+09)	Park Jong-oh 5'; Park Yong-ji 10'; Hwang Ui-jo 17', 35'; Jung Seok-hwa 26', 80'; Kang Jong-guk 89'; Jwa Joon-hyeop 90+3' (pen.)	Report	Li Mau 31'	Stadium: Thuwunna Stadium, Yangon; Attendance: 6,500; Referee: Jameel Juma Abdulhusain (Bahrain)

28 June Group G	South Korea	0–0	Myanmar	Yangon, Myanmar
18:15 MST (UTC+09)		Report		Stadium: Thuwunna Stadium, Yangon; Attendance: 20,000; Referee: Jumpei Iida (Japan)

30 June Group G	Philippines	0–10	South Korea	Yangon, Myanmar
18:15 MST (UTC+09)		Report	Jeong Jong-hee 16', 83'; Hwang Ui-jo 23', 31'; Lee Jae-sung 28'; Jwa Joon-hyeop 34', 35'; Choi Ji-hoon 41'; Jeon Byung-soo 76', 90+1'	Stadium: Thuwunna Stadium, Yangon; Attendance: 100; Referee: Jameel Juma Abdulhusain (Bahrain)

3 July Group G	South Korea	2–0	Vietnam	Yangon, Myanmar
15:15 MST (UTC+09)	Park Yong-ji 28'; Jeong Jong-hee 45+2'	Report		Stadium: Bogyoke Aung San Stadium, Yangon; Attendance: 50; Referee: Jumpei Iida (Japan)

Group G table
Pos	Team	Pld	W	D	L	GF	GA	GD	Pts	Qualification
1	South Korea	5	4	1	0	23	3	+20	13	Qualification for AFC U-22 Championship
2	Myanmar	5	4	1	0	16	5	+11	13	Qualification for AFC U-22 Championship
3	Malaysia	5	3	0	2	17	7	+10	9	
4	Chinese Taipei	5	2	0	3	9	20	−11	6	
5	Vietnam	5	1	0	4	11	10	+1	3	
6	Philippines	5	0	0	5	2	33	−31	0	

Source: AFC

=== Friendlies ===
==== Senior team ====
25 February	South Korea	4–2	Uzbekistan	Jeonju, South Korea
14:00 UTC+9	Lee Dong-gook 19', 45'; Kim Chi-woo 46', 90+1'	Report	Rakhimov 78'; Andreev 83' (pen.)	Stadium: Jeonju World Cup Stadium; Attendance: 28,391; Referee: Chaiya Mahapab (Thailand)

30 May	South Korea	1–4	Spain	Bern, Switzerland
20:00	Kim Do-heon 43'	Report	Torres 11'; Alonso 53' (pen.); Cazorla 58'; Negredo 82'	Stadium: Stade de Suisse Wankdorf; Attendance: 10,220; Referee: Alain Bieri (Switzerland)

15 August	South Korea	2–1	Zambia	Anyang, South Korea
20:00	Lee Keun-ho 15', 49'	Report	Mayuka 29'	Stadium: Anyang Stadium; Attendance: 16,606; Referee: Nawaf Abdullah (Bahrain)

14 November	South Korea	1–2	Australia	Hwaseong, South Korea
19:00	Lee Dong-gook 11'	Report	Nikita Rukavytsya 43'; Robert Cornthwaite 87'	Stadium: Hwaseong Stadium; Attendance: 21,618; Referee: Wang Zhe (China}

==== Under-23 team ====
15 January	Thailand A	1–3	South Korea	Nakhon Ratchasima, Thailand
19:00 TST (UTC+07)	Teerathep 53'	Report	Kim Dong-sub 42'; Seo Jung-jin 69'; Kim Hyun-sung 79'	Stadium: 80th Birthday Stadium, Nakhon Ratchasima; Attendance: 11,000; Referee: Yudai Yamamoto (JPN)

18 January	South Korea	0–0	Denmark XI	Nakhon Ratchasima, Thailand
16:10 TST (UTC+07)		Report		Stadium: 80th Birthday Stadium, Nakhon Ratchasima; Attendance: 150; Referee: Prathan Nasa Wang (THA)

21 January	Norway A	0–3	South Korea	Nakhon Ratchasima, Thailand
16:10 TST (UTC+07)		Report	Kim Bo-kyung 18' (pen.); Kim Hyun-sung 21'; Seo Jung-jin 59'	Stadium: 80th Birthday Stadium, Nakhon Ratchasima; Attendance: 400; Referee: Chaiya Mahapab (THA)

7 June	South Korea	3–1	Syria	Hwaseong, South Korea
20:00 UTC+09	Kim Ki-hee 33', 60'; Yun Il-lok 45'	Report	Salem 52'	Stadium: Hwaseong Stadium; Attendance: 33,853명; Referee: Chaiya Mahapab (Thailand)

14 July	South Korea	2–1	New Zealand	Seoul, South Korea
18:00 UTC+09	Park Chu-young 18'; Nam Tae-hee 82'	Report	Smeltz 72'	Stadium: Seoul World Cup Stadium, Suwon; Attendance: 31,655명; Referee: Valentin Kovalenko (Uzbekistan)

20 July	South Korea	3–0	Senegal	Stevenage, United Kingdom
	Ki Sung-yueng 3'; Park Chu-young 6'; Koo Ja-cheol 31'	Report		Stadium: Broadhall Way, Stevenage; Attendance: 300; Referee: Gavin Ward (England)

8 December	China	2–1	South Korea	Wuhan, China
15:30 CST (UTC+08)	Yang Yihu 10'; Zhang Xizhe 90+1' (pen.)	Report	Choe Ji-hoon 25'	Stadium: Wuhan Sports Center Stadium, Wuhan; Attendance: 8,796; Referee: Fan Qi (China PR)

11 December	China	0–1	South Korea	Hefei, China
19:35 CST (UTC+08)		Report	Jung Seok-hwa 82'	Stadium: Hefei Olympic Sports Center Stadium, Hefei; Attendance: 11,298; Referee: Zhenlu Shi (China PR)

== Leagues ==
=== K League ===
Pos	Team	Pld	W	D	L	GF	GA	GD	Pts	Qualification or relegation
1	FC Seoul (C)	44	29	9	6	76	42	+34	96	Qualification for Champions League (Note: Pohang Steelers finished the league in third place after qualifying for the Champions League as champions of the FA Cup. Therefore, the spot given to the third-placed team was passed to the fourth-placed team.)
2	Jeonbuk Hyundai Motors	44	22	13	9	82	49	+33	79	Qualification for Champions League
3	Pohang Steelers	44	23	8	13	72	47	+25	77	Qualification for Champions League
4	Suwon Samsung Bluewings	44	20	13	11	61	51	+10	73	Qualification for Champions League
5	Ulsan Hyundai	44	18	14	12	60	52	+8	68	
6	Jeju United	44	16	15	13	71	56	+15	63	
7	Busan IPark	44	13	14	17	40	51	−11	53	
8	Gyeongnam FC	44	14	8	22	50	60	−10	50	
9	Incheon United	44	17	16	11	46	40	+6	67	
10	Daegu FC	44	16	13	15	55	56	−1	61	
11	Jeonnam Dragons	44	13	14	17	47	60	−13	53	
12	Seongnam Ilhwa Chunma	44	14	10	20	47	56	−9	52	
13	Daejeon Citizen	44	13	11	20	46	67	−21	50	
14	Gangwon FC	44	14	7	23	57	68	−11	49	
15	Gwangju FC (R)	44	10	15	19	57	67	−10	45	Relegation to K League Challenge
16	Sangju Sangmu Phoenix (R)	44	7	6	31	29	74	−45	27	Withdrawal (Note: Sangju Sangmu Phoenix were going to be forcibly relegated to the second division by K League Federation regardless of the results for a reason that they failed to get the club license of Asian Football Confederation. They boycotted the rest of the season from the 31st to the last matchweek after their relegation was decided.)

Source: K League
Rules for classification: 1) Points; 2) Goal difference; 3) Goals scored.
(C) Champions; (R) Relegated

=== Korea National League ===
==== Regular season ====
Pos	Team	Pld	W	D	L	GF	GA	GD	Pts	Qualification
1	Goyang KB Kookmin Bank	26	15	10	1	51	20	+31	55	Qualification for playoffs final
2	Hyundai Mipo Dockyard	26	15	4	7	61	30	+31	49	Qualification for playoffs semi-final
3	Gangneung City	26	14	5	7	32	21	+11	47	Qualification for playoffs first round
4	Changwon City	26	14	4	8	36	30	+6	46	Qualification for playoffs first round
5	Incheon Korail (C)	26	12	6	8	39	30	+9	42	Qualification for playoffs first round
6	Yongin City	26	12	6	8	37	35	+2	42	Qualification for playoffs first round
7	Busan Transportation Corporation	26	11	8	7	28	23	+5	41	
8	Mokpo City	26	10	6	10	28	37	−9	36	
9	Suwon City (P)	26	9	7	10	29	32	−3	34	Promotion to K League Challenge
10	Ansan H FC (P)	26	8	8	10	25	34	−9	32	Promotion to K League Challenge
11	Gimhae City	26	6	10	10	26	34	−8	28	
12	Chungju Hummel (P)	26	5	6	15	20	34	−14	21	Promotion to K League Challenge
13	Cheonan City	26	6	1	19	25	45	−20	19	
14	Daejeon KHNP	26	3	3	20	22	54	−32	12	

Source: Korea National League (in Korean)
Rules for classification: 1) Points; 2) Goal difference; 3) Goals scored.
(C) Champions; (P) Promoted

==== Championship playoffs ====
First round
3	Gangneung City	0 (2)
6	Yongin City (p)	0 (4)
4	Changwon City	0
5	Incheon Korail	2

Second round
Yongin City	1
Incheon Korail	3

Semifinal
2	Hyundai Mipo Dockyard	1
Incheon Korail	2

Final
1	Goyang KB	0	2	2
Incheon Korail (a.e.t.)	1	3	4

=== Challengers League ===
==== Regular season ====
Pos	Team	Pld	W	D	L	GF	GA	GD	Pts	Qualification
1	Pocheon Citizen (C)	25	20	2	3	101	24	+77	62	Qualification for playoffs final and FA Cup first round
2	Chuncheon FC	25	18	4	3	62	25	+37	58	Qualification for playoffs semi-final and FA Cup first round
3	Paju Citizen	25	15	5	5	61	34	+27	50	Qualification for playoffs first round and FA Cup first round
4	Cheongju Jikji	25	14	7	4	72	30	+42	49	Qualification for playoffs first round and FA Cup first round
5	Icheon Citizen	25	17	2	6	73	27	+46	53	Qualification for FA Cup first round
6	Yangju Citizen	25	14	4	7	79	51	+28	46	Qualification for FA Cup first round
7	Gyeongju Citizen	25	12	7	6	48	30	+18	43	Qualification for FA Cup first round
8	Bucheon FC 1995 (P)	25	12	5	8	52	29	+23	41	Qualification for K League Challenge and FA Cup second round
9	Seoul United	25	11	5	9	62	56	+6	38	Qualification for FA Cup first round
10	Yeonggwang FC	25	9	5	11	45	38	+7	32	Qualification for FA Cup first round
11	Cheonan FC	25	7	10	8	44	43	+1	31	Qualification for FA Cup first round
12	Jeonju EM	25	8	4	13	51	55	−4	28	Qualification for FA Cup first round
13	Gwangju Gwangsan	25	8	4	13	47	68	−21	28	Qualification for FA Cup first round
14	Yesan United	25	8	2	15	57	72	−15	26	
15	Goyang Citizen	25	5	7	13	44	60	−16	21	
16	Jungnang Chorus Mustang	25	6	2	17	33	75	−42	20	
17	Namyangju United	25	2	1	22	31	120	−89	6	
18	Seoul FC Martyrs	25	0	2	23	33	158	−125	2	

Source: KFA Soccerway
Rules for classification: 1) Points; 2) Goal difference; 3) Goals scored.
(C) Champions; (P) Promoted

==== Championship playoffs ====
First round
3	Paju Citizen (p)	1 (5)
4	Cheongju Jikji	1 (4)

Semi-final
2	Chuncheon FC	3
Paju Citizen	2

Final
1	Pocheon Citizen	1
Chuncheon FC	0

=== WK League ===
==== Regular season ====
Pos	Team	Pld	W	D	L	GF	GA	GD	Pts	Qualification
1	Goyang Daekyo Noonnoppi (C)	21	17	2	2	54	11	+43	53	Qualification for playoffs final
2	Incheon Hyundai Steel Red Angels	21	16	2	3	43	17	+26	50	Qualification for playoffs semi-final
3	Jeonbuk KSPO	21	10	2	9	30	32	−2	32	Qualification for playoffs semi-final
4	Chungbuk Sportstoto	21	7	5	9	31	43	−12	26	
5	Seoul City Amazones	21	5	9	7	26	29	−3	24	
6	Suwon FMC	21	6	6	9	29	39	−10	24	
7	Chungnam Ilhwa Chunma	21	3	6	12	16	30	−14	15	
8	Busan Sangmu	21	2	4	15	25	53	−28	10	

Source: WK League
Rules for classification: 1) Points; 2) Goal difference; 3) Goals scored
(C) Champions

==== Championship playoffs ====
Semi-final			Final
			1	Goyang Daekyo Noonnoppi	0	3	3
2	Incheon Hyundai Steel Red Angels	3		Incheon Hyundai Steel Red Angels	1	1	2
3	Jeonbuk KSPO	2

== Domestic cups ==
=== Korean FA Cup ===
Round of 32
Pohang Steelers	4
Cheongju Jikji	0
Gwangju FC	4
Chungju Hummel	2
Jeonbuk Hyundai Motors	3
Cheonan City	1
Jeonnam Dragons (a.e.t.)	1
Changwon City	0
Daejeon Citizen	2
Gyeongju Citizen	1
Sangju Sangmu Phoenix	2
Hyundai Mipo Dockyard	1
Jeju United	2
Incheon Korail	1
Daegu FC	3
Korean Police	1
Gyeongnam FC (p)	2 (5)
Busan Transportation Corporation	2 (4)
Gangwon FC	1
Korea University	0
FC Seoul	3
Mokpo City	0
Suwon Samsung Bluewings	5
Gangneung City	2
Seongnam Ilhwa Chunma	5
Suwon City	1
Ulsan Hyundai	1
Daejeon KHNP	0
Incheon United	3
Gimhae City	0
Busan IPark	0
Goyang KB Kookmin Bank	1

Round of 16
Pohang Steelers	3
Gwangju FC	1
Jeonbuk Hyundai Motors	1
Jeonnam Dragons	0
Daejeon Citizen (p)	2 (4)
Sangju Sangmu Phoenix	2 (2)
Jeju United	2
Daegu FC	0
Gyeongnam FC	1
Gangwon FC	0
FC Seoul	0
Suwon Samsung Bluewings	2
Seongnam Ilhwa Chunma	1
Ulsan Hyundai	2
Incheon United	2 (3)
Goyang KB Kookmin Bank (p)	2 (4)

Quarter-finals
Pohang Steelers	3
Jeonbuk Hyundai Motors	2
Daejeon Citizen	1
Jeju United	2
Gyeongnam FC (p)	1 (4)
Suwon Samsung Bluewings	1 (2)
Ulsan Hyundai	6
Goyang KB Kookmin Bank	1

Semi-finals
1 September – Pohang
Pohang Steelers	2
Jeju United	1
1 September – Ulsan
Gyeongnam FC	3
Ulsan Hyundai	0

Final
20 October – Pohang
Pohang Steelers (a.e.t.)	1
Gyeongnam FC	0

=== Korea National League Championship ===
==== Group stage ====
Group A
Pos	Team	Pld	Pts
1	Hyundai Mipo Dockyard	2	3
2	Daejeon KHNP	2	3
3	Chungju Hummel	2	3

Group B
Pos	Team	Pld	Pts
1	Korean Police	3	6
2	Yongin City	3	6
3	Incheon Korail	3	3
4	Cheonan City	3	3

Group C
Pos	Team	Pld	Pts
1	Suwon City	3	7
2	Busan Transportation Corporation	3	6
3	Ansan H FC	3	3
4	Gimhae City	3	1

Group D
Pos	Team	Pld	Pts
1	Goyang KB Kookmin Bank	3	6
2	Gangneung City	3	4
3	Changwon City	3	4
4	Mokpo City	3	3

==== Knockout stage ====
Quarter-finals
Hyundai Mipo Dockyard	1
Busan Transportation Corporation	0
Korean Police	5
Gangneung City	0
Suwon City	1
Daejeon KHNP	0
Goyang KB Kookmin Bank	1
Yongin City	0

Semi-finals
Hyundai Mipo Dockyard	2
Korean Police	1
Suwon City	4
Goyang KB Kookmin Bank	3

Final
Hyundai Mipo Dockyard	0
Suwon City	2

=== Challengers Cup ===
==== Group stage ====
Group A
Pos	Team	Pld	Pts
1	Gyeongju Citizen	2	6
2	Cheongju Jikji	2	1
3	Jeonju EM	2	1

Source: KFA

Group B
Pos	Team	Pld	Pts
1	Pocheon Citizen	2	6
2	Yesan United	2	3
3	Yangju Citizen	2	0

Source: KFA

Group C
Pos	Team	Pld	Pts
1	Goyang Citizen	2	6
2	Namyangju United	2	3
3	Jungnang Chorus Mustang	2	0

Source: KFA

Group D
Pos	Team	Pld	Pts
1	Bucheon FC 1995	2	6
2	Seoul United	2	3
3	Cheonan FC	2	0

Source: KFA

Group E
Pos	Team	Pld	Pts
1	Paju Citizen	2	6
2	Chuncheon FC	2	3
3	Yeonggwang FC	2	0

Source: KFA

Group F
Pos	Team	Pld	Pts
1	Icheon Citizen	2	6
2	Gwangju Gwangsan	2	3
3	Seoul FC Martyrs	2	0

Source: KFA

==== Knockout stage ====
Quarter-finals
Gyeongju Citizen (p)	0 (3)
Paju Citizen	0 (2)
Pocheon Citizen	8
Yesan United	2
Goyang Citizen	1 (3)
Icheon Citizen (p)	1 (5)
Bucheon FC 1995	6
Gwangju Gwangsan	0

Semi-finals
Gyeongju Citizen	0
Pocheon Citizen	1
Icheon Citizen	3
Bucheon FC 1995	1

Final
Pocheon Citizen	0
Icheon Citizen	3

== International cups ==
=== AFC Champions League ===
Team	Result	Round	Aggregate	Score	Venue	Opponent
Jeonbuk Hyundai Motors	Group stage	Group H	Third place	1–5	Home	(China) Guangzhou Evergrande
Jeonbuk Hyundai Motors	Group stage	Group H	Third place	3–1	Away	(China) Guangzhou Evergrande
Jeonbuk Hyundai Motors	Group stage	Group H	Third place	1–5	Away	(Japan) Kashiwa Reysol
Jeonbuk Hyundai Motors	Group stage	Group H	Third place	0–2	Home	(Japan) Kashiwa Reysol
Jeonbuk Hyundai Motors	Group stage	Group H	Third place	2–0	Away	(Thailand) Buriram United
Jeonbuk Hyundai Motors	Group stage	Group H	Third place	3–2	Home	(Thailand) Buriram United
Pohang Steelers	Group stage	Qualifying play-offs	2–0	2–0	—	(Thailand) Chonburi
Pohang Steelers	Group stage	Group E	Third place	3–0	Away	(Japan) Gamba Osaka
Pohang Steelers	Group stage	Group E	Third place	2–0	Home	(Japan) Gamba Osaka
Pohang Steelers	Group stage	Group E	Third place	0–2	Home	(Uzbekistan) Bunyodkor
Pohang Steelers	Group stage	Group E	Third place	0–1	Away	(Uzbekistan) Bunyodkor
Pohang Steelers	Group stage	Group E	Third place	1–0	Home	(Australia) Adelaide United
Pohang Steelers	Group stage	Group E	Third place	0–1	Away	(Australia) Adelaide United
Seongnam Ilhwa Chunma	Round of 16	Group G	Winners	2–2	Away	(Japan) Nagoya Grampus
Seongnam Ilhwa Chunma	Round of 16	Group G	Winners	1–1	Home	(Japan) Nagoya Grampus
Seongnam Ilhwa Chunma	Round of 16	Group G	Winners	1–1	Home	(China) Tianjin TEDA
Seongnam Ilhwa Chunma	Round of 16	Group G	Winners	3–0	Away	(China) Tianjin TEDA
Seongnam Ilhwa Chunma	Round of 16	Group G	Winners	1–1	Away	(Australia) Central Coast Mariners
Seongnam Ilhwa Chunma	Round of 16	Group G	Winners	5–0	Home	(Australia) Central Coast Mariners
Seongnam Ilhwa Chunma	Round of 16	Round of 16	0–1	0–1	—	(Uzbekistan) Bunyodkor
Ulsan Hyundai	Champions	Group F	Winners	2–1	Home	(China) Beijing Guoan
Ulsan Hyundai	Champions	Group F	Winners	3–2	Away	(China) Beijing Guoan
Ulsan Hyundai	Champions	Group F	Winners	2–2	Away	(Japan) FC Tokyo
Ulsan Hyundai	Champions	Group F	Winners	1–0	Home	(Japan) FC Tokyo
Ulsan Hyundai	Champions	Group F	Winners	1–1	Home	(Australia) Brisbane Roar
Ulsan Hyundai	Champions	Group F	Winners	2–1	Away	(Australia) Brisbane Roar
Ulsan Hyundai	Champions	Round of 16	3–2	3–2	—	(Japan) Kashiwa Reysol
Ulsan Hyundai	Champions	Quarter-finals	5–0	1–0	Home	(Saudi Arabia) Al-Hilal
Ulsan Hyundai	Champions	Quarter-finals	5–0	4–0	Away	(Saudi Arabia) Al-Hilal
Ulsan Hyundai	Champions	Semi-finals	5–1	3–1	Away	(Uzbekistan) Bunyodkor
Ulsan Hyundai	Champions	Semi-finals	5–1	2–0	Home	(Uzbekistan) Bunyodkor
Ulsan Hyundai	Champions	Final	3–0	3–0	—	(Saudi Arabia) Al-Ahli

=== FIFA Club World Cup ===
Team	Result	Round	Score	Opponent
Ulsan Hyundai	Sixth place	Quarter-finals	1–3	(Mexico) Monterrey
Ulsan Hyundai	Sixth place	Fifth place match	2–3	(Japan) Sanfrecce Hiroshima

== See also ==
- Football in South Korea
