= List of football clubs in South Korea =

This is a list of South Korean association football clubs, as of the 2026 season. The clubs are arranged alphabetically.

== K League 1 ==
- FC Anyang
- Bucheon FC 1995
- Daejeon Hana Citizen
- Gangwon FC
- Gimcheon Sangmu
- Gwangju FC
- Incheon United
- Jeju SK
- Jeonbuk Hyundai Motors
- Pohang Steelers
- FC Seoul
- Ulsan HD

== K League 2 ==
- Ansan Greeners
- Busan IPark
- Cheonan City
- Chungbuk Cheongju
- Chungnam Asan
- Daegu FC
- Gimhae FC 2008
- Gimpo FC
- Gyeongnam FC
- Hwaseong FC
- Jeonnam Dragons
- Paju Frontier
- Seongnam FC
- Seoul E-Land
- Suwon FC
- Suwon Samsung Bluewings
- Yongin FC

== K3 League ==
- Busan TC
- Changwon FC
- Chuncheon FC
- Dangjin Citizen
- Daejeon Korail
- FC Gangneung
- Gyeongju KHNP
- Jeonbuk Hyundai Motors N
- FC Mokpo
- Pocheon Citizen
- Siheung Citizen
- Ulsan Citizen
- Yangpyeong FC
- Yeoju FC

== K4 League ==
- Geoje Citizen
- Geumsan Insam
- Gijang Citizen
- Haman FC
- Jecheon Citizen
- Jincheon HR
- Jinju Citizen
- Namyangju FC
- Pyeongchang United
- Pyeongtaek Citizen
- Sejong SA
- Seoul Jungnang
- Seosan Pioneer
- Yangju Citizen (inactive)

== Former clubs ==
- Asan Mugunghwa
- Asan United
- Changwon United
- Cheil Industries
- Cheongju City
- Chohung Bank
- Chonbuk Buffalo
- Chungju Hummel
- Daegu FC B
- Daegu KAPEC
- E-Land Puma
- FC Namdong
- Goyang Citizen
- Goyang Happiness
- Goyang KB Kookmin Bank
- Goyang Zaicro
- Gyeongju Citizen
- Hallelujah FC
- Hanil Bank
- Hanil Life Insurance
- Hongcheon Idu
- Hyundai Mipo Dockyard
- Icheon Citizen
- Icheon Sangmu
- Industrial Bank of Korea
- Jeonju Citizen
- Jeonju Ongoeul
- Korea Housing Bank
- Korea Tungsten
- Namyangju United
- Samcheok Shinwoo Electronics
- FC Sejong
- Seoul City
- Seoul FC Martyrs
- Seoul Nowon United
- Seoul Pabal
- Yangzee
- Yeoncheon FC
- Yeonggwang FC
- Yesan FC
- Yongin Citizen
- Yongin City

== See also ==
- List of women's football clubs in South Korea
- K League
- K League 1
- K League 2
- K3 League
- K4 League
