= 2012 Korean FA Cup =

2012 Hana Bank FA Cup

Tournament details
- Country: South Korea
- Teams: 47

Final positions
- Champions: Pohang Steelers (3rd title)
- Runners-up: Gyeongnam FC

Tournament statistics
- Matches played: 46
- Goals scored: 158 (3.43 per match)
- Top goal scorer: No Byung-jun (3 goals)

Awards
- Best player: Hwang Ji-soo

The 2012 Korean FA Cup, known as the 2012 Hana Bank FA Cup, was the 17th edition of the Korean FA Cup. Pohang Steelers became champions and qualified for the 2013 AFC Champions League.

== Schedule ==
Round	Date	Matches	Clubs remaining	Clubs involved	New entries this round
First round	17–18 March 2012	8	47	16	8 Challengers League teams 7 university teams 1 invited team
Second round	28–29 April 2012	7	39	8+6	5 Korea National League teams 1 Challengers League team
Round of 32	23 May 2012	16	32	7+25	16 K League teams 9 Korea National League teams
Round of 16	20 June 2012	8	16	16	None
Quarter-finals	1 August 2012	4	8	8	None
Semi-finals	1 September 2012	2	4	4	None
Final	20 October 2012	1	2	2	None

== Teams ==
Entry round	Participating teams		
Round of 32	K League All 16 teams of the 2012 season		Korea National League Top 9 teams of the 2011 season
Round of 32	Busan IPark; Daegu FC; Daejeon Citizen; FC Seoul; Gangwon FC; Gwangju FC; Gyeongnam FC; Incheon United; Jeju United; Jeonbuk Hyundai Motors; Jeonnam Dragons; Pohang Steelers; Sangju Sangmu Phoenix; Seongnam Ilhwa Chunma; Suwon Samsung Bluewings; Ulsan Hyundai		Busan Transportation Corporation; Changwon City; Cheonan City; Daejeon KHNP; Gangneung City; Goyang KB Kookmin Bank; Incheon Korail; Suwon City; Hyundai Mipo Dockyard
Second round	Korea National League Rest 5 teams of the 2012 season		Challengers League Champions of the 2011 season
Second round	Ansan H FC; Chungju Hummel; Gimhae City; Mokpo City; Yongin City		Gyeongju Citizen
First round	Challengers League Top 8 teams of the 2011 season excluding champions		
First round	Bucheon FC 1995; Cheongju Jikji; Chuncheon FC; Icheon Citizen; FC Pocheon; Seoul FC Martyrs; Seoul United; Yangju Citizen		
First round	U-League Top 4 teams of the 2011 season	National University League (Spring) Champions of the 2011 season	National University Championship Champions of the 2011 season
First round	Hongik University; University of Ulsan; Dongguk University; Hannam University	Korea University	Ajou University
First round	Hongik University; University of Ulsan; Dongguk University; Hannam University	Korean National Sports Festival Champions of the 2011 season	Invited team 1 team
First round	Hongik University; University of Ulsan; Dongguk University; Hannam University	Sungkyunkwan University	Korean Police

== Qualifying rounds ==
The first round was held on 17–18 March 2012, and the second round on 28–29 April 2012.

=== First round ===
The draw for the first round was held on 22 February 2012.

17 March 2012	Chuncheon FC	1–2	Korea University	Chuncheon Stadium, Chuncheon
15:00 KST	Choi Young-dong 5'		Park Jong-won 17'; An Jin-beom 83'	Attendance: 1,500

18 March 2012	Yangju Citizen	3–1	Dongguk University	Godeok Artificial Ground, Yangju
14:00 KST	Lee Young-woong 39'; Choi Young-nam 62'; Cho Young-min 74'		Chu Pyung-kang 10'	Attendance: 500

17 March 2012	FC Pocheon	2–0	University of Ulsan	Pocheon Stadium, Pocheon
14:00 KST	Kang Seok-gu 5'; Hwang Heon-ju 20'			Attendance: 1,200

17 March 2012	Seoul United	2–4	Hannam University	Madeul Stadium, Seoul
15:00 KST	Jung Ji-soo 7'; Jung Jung-hyun 87'		Kwak Dae-ro 47'; Lee Min-soo 56'; Jo Woo-jin 59'; Lee Jae-young 90'	Attendance: 420

18 March 2012	Bucheon FC 1995	0–4	Korean Police	Hyochang Stadium, Seoul
14:00 KST			Kim Je-hwan 7'; Kim Moon-soo 58'; Yang Dong-hyun 78'; Kim Do-heon 89'	Attendance: 450

17 March 2012	Icheon Citizen	3–2 (a.e.t.)	Hongik University	Icheon City Stadium Subground, Icheon
15:00 KST	Park Chun-sin 12', 34'; Kim Seung-cheol 97'		Cho Joon-jae 89', 90+2'	Attendance: 500

17 March 2012	Cheongju Jikji	3–1	Ajou University	Cheongju Yongjeong Center, Cheongju
15:00 KST	Jung Bae-keun 45'; Kim Hee-jung 74'; Lee Jin-won 86'		Heo Jae-nyung 59'	Attendance: 550

18 March 2012	Sungkyunkwan University	8–0	Seoul FC Martyrs	Hyochang Stadium, Seoul
11:00 KST	Lee Hyung-jin 10'; Han Hong-kyu 20', 44'; Hwang In-wook 34'; Kim Sang-pil 47', 71'; Kim Jun-young 51'; Kim Sung-hyun 73'			Attendance: 180

=== Second round ===
The draw for the second round was held on 28 March 2012.

28 April 2012	Yongin City	0–4	Korean Police	Yongin Football Center, Yongin
15:00 KST	Kwon Oh-kyu (yellow card) 48' (yellow-red card) 90+1'		Kim Young-hoo 9', 86'; Kim Do-heon 20'; Yoon Dong-min 26'	Attendance: 150

28 April 2012	Mokpo City	5–1	Sungkyunkwan University	Mokpo International Football Center, Mokpo
15:00 KST	Jo Keon-woo 13', 85'; Kwon Soon-hak 38', 45'; Kim Hyun-yong 74'		Kim Joon 63'	Attendance: 250

28 April 2012	Gimhae City	1–1 (a.e.t.) (5–4 p)	Yangju Citizen	Gimhae Stadium, Gimhae
19:00 KST	Gu Hyeon-seo 4'		Choi Young-nam 60'	Attendance: 350

28 April 2012	Cheongju Jikji	1–0 (a.e.t.)	Ansan H FC	Cheongju Yongjeong Center, Cheongju
15:00 KST	Yang Jeong-gyu 118'			Attendance: 600

28 April 2012	Gyeongju Citizen	1–1 (a.e.t.) (5–4 p)	Hannam University	Gyeongju Civic Stadium, Gyeongju
15:00 KST	Kim Min-seob 48'		Lee Jae-young 25'	Attendance: 300

28 April 2012	Icheon Citizen	0–2	Chungju Hummel	Icheon City Stadium, Icheon
15:00 KST			Kim Kwang-hyun 55'; Lee Ha-jeong 64'	Attendance: 360

28 April 2012	FC Pocheon	2–4	Korea University	Pocheon Stadium, Pocheon
15:00 KST	Kang Seok-goo 54', 90'		Park Hee-sung 30'; Lee Jae-seong 67'; Lee Sang-hyeob 80'; Kim Woo-hyun 90+2'	Attendance: 2,700

== Final rounds ==
=== Bracket ===
Round of 32
Pohang Steelers	4
Cheongju Jikji	0
Gwangju FC	4
Chungju Hummel	2
Jeonbuk Hyundai Motors	3
Cheonan City	1
Jeonnam Dragons (a.e.t.)	1
Changwon City	0
Daejeon Citizen	2
Gyeongju Citizen	1
Sangju Sangmu Phoenix	2
Hyundai Mipo Dockyard	1
Jeju United	2
Incheon Korail	1
Daegu FC	3
Korean Police	1
Gyeongnam FC (p)	2 (5)
Busan Transportation Corporation	2 (4)
Gangwon FC	1
Korea University	0
FC Seoul	3
Mokpo City	0
Suwon Samsung Bluewings	5
Gangneung City	2
Seongnam Ilhwa Chunma	5
Suwon City	1
Ulsan Hyundai	1
Daejeon KHNP	0
Incheon United	3
Gimhae City	0
Busan IPark	0
Goyang KB Kookmin Bank	1

Round of 16
Pohang Steelers	3
Gwangju FC	1
Jeonbuk Hyundai Motors	1
Jeonnam Dragons	0
Daejeon Citizen (p)	2 (4)
Sangju Sangmu Phoenix	2 (2)
Jeju United	2
Daegu FC	0
Gyeongnam FC	1
Gangwon FC	0
FC Seoul	0
Suwon Samsung Bluewings	2
Seongnam Ilhwa Chunma	1
Ulsan Hyundai	2
Incheon United	2 (3)
Goyang KB Kookmin Bank (p)	2 (4)

Quarter-finals
Pohang Steelers	3
Jeonbuk Hyundai Motors	2
Daejeon Citizen	1
Jeju United	2
Gyeongnam FC (p)	1 (4)
Suwon Samsung Bluewings	1 (2)
Ulsan Hyundai	6
Goyang KB Kookmin Bank	1

Semi-finals
1 September – Pohang
Pohang Steelers	2
Jeju United	1
1 September – Ulsan
Gyeongnam FC	3
Ulsan Hyundai	0

Final
20 October – Pohang
Pohang Steelers (a.e.t.)	1
Gyeongnam FC	0

=== Round of 32 ===
The draw for the round of 32 was held on 3 May 2012.

23 May 2012	Pohang Steelers	4–0	Cheongju Jikji	Pohang Steel Yard, Pohang
19:30 KST	Shin Hyung-min 14' (pen.); Asamoah 51'; Ko Mu-yeol 66'; Park Sung-ho 76'			Attendance: 1,452

23 May 2012	Incheon United	3–0	Gimhae City	Incheon Football Stadium, Incheon
19:00 KST	Park Jun-tae 31'; Seol Ki-hyeon 70'; Ivo 78' (pen.)			Attendance: 400

23 May 2012	Gangwon FC	1–0	Korea University	Gangneung Stadium, Gangneung
19:00 KST	Jung Sung-min 86'			Attendance: 80

23 May 2012	FC Seoul	3–0	Mokpo City	Seoul World Cup Stadium, Seoul
19:30 KST	Molina 62'; Ha Dae-sung 83'; Kim Hyun-sung 84'			Attendance: 1,751

23 May 2012	Suwon Samsung Bluewings	5–2	Gangneung City	Suwon World Cup Stadium, Suwon
19:30 KST	Radončić 7'; Cho Yong-tae 27'; Ristić 37', 86'; Park Hyun-beom 43'		Yoon Jong-pil 14'; Jin Chang-soo 30'; Kim Ho-dae (yellow card) 42' (yellow-red card) 72'	Attendance: 3,214

23 May 2012	Jeonnam Dragons	1–0 (a.e.t.)	Changwon City	Gwangyang Football Stadium, Gwangyang
19:00 KST	Cornthwaite 110'; Lee Jong-ho (yellow card) 12' (yellow-red card) 118'			Attendance: 940

23 May 2012	Seongnam Ilhwa Chunma	5–1	Suwon City	Tancheon Sports Complex, Seongnam
19:00 KST	Ognenovski 5'; Han Sang-woon 14'; Yoon Bit-garam 57'; Kim Sung-hwan 64'; Jo Tae-woo 77' (o.g.)		Lim Sung-taek 45+1'	Attendance: 1,958

23 May 2012	Sangju Sangmu Phoenix	2–1	Hyundai Mipo Dockyard	Gimcheon Stadium, Gimcheon
19:00 KST	Yoo Chang-hyun 56'; Kim Jae-sung 88'		Lee Yong-joon 75'; Kim Ho-you (yellow card) 80' (yellow-red card) 85'	Attendance: 800

23 May 2012	Jeju United	2–1	Incheon Korail	Jeju World Cup Stadium, Seogwipo
19:00 KST	Shim Young-sung 41'; Jair 56'		Lee Seung-hwan 70'	Attendance: 750

23 May 2012	Jeonbuk Hyundai Motors	3–1	Cheonan City	Jeonju World Cup Stadium, Jeonju
19:00 KST	Eninho 20'; Jeong Shung-hoon 36'; Lee Gang-jin 70'		Kim Bon-kwang 85'	Attendance: 1,892

23 May 2012	Busan Transportation Corporation	2–2 (a.e.t.) (4–5 p)	Gyeongnam FC	Busan Gudeok Stadium, Busan
19:00 KST	Kim Kyung-choon 37'; Cha Chul-ho 108'		Caíque 45'; Kim In-han 98'	Attendance: 800
	Penalties
	Kwon Yong-hyeok (penalty scored); Park Hyuk-soon (penalty scored); Kang Jin-kyu (penalty missed); Ju Ki-ho (penalty missed); Park Seung-min (penalty scored); Yoon Tae-hyeon (penalty scored); Kim Hyun-soo (penalty missed)		(penalty scored) Caíque; (penalty scored) Jo Jae-cheol; (penalty missed) Kim In-han; (penalty scored) Choi Hyun-yeon; (penalty missed) Kang Seung-jo; (penalty scored) Kang Min-hyuk; (penalty scored) Kim Byung-ji

23 May 2012	Busan IPark	0–1	Goyang KB Kookmin Bank	Busan Asiad Stadium, Busan
19:30 KST			Lee Jae-won 66'	Attendance: 689

23 May 2012	Ulsan Hyundai	1–0	Daejeon KHNP	Ulsan Munsu Football Stadium, Ulsan
19:30 KST	Kim Shin-wook 38'			Attendance: 1,115

23 May 2012	Daegu FC	3–1	Korean Police	Daegu Stadium, Daegu
19:00 KST	Lee Jin-ho 17'; Song Je-heon 28'; Kim Dae-yeol 59'		Yang Dong-hyun 71'	Attendance: 754

23 May 2012	Chungju Hummel	2–4	Gwangju FC	Chungju Stadium, Chungju
19:00 KST	Kim Seong-jun 44'; Kang Du-ho 71'		Ahn Sung-nam 27'; Milić 45+2', 62'; Lee Han-saem 77'	Attendance: 3,500

23 May 2012	Daejeon Citizen	2–1	Gyeongju Citizen	Daejeon World Cup Stadium, Daejeon
19:00 KST	Baba 32'; Oris 36'		Choi Seok-min 44'	Attendance: 878

=== Round of 16 ===
The draw for the round of 16 was held on 31 May 2012.

20 June 2012	Gyeongnam FC	1–0	Gangwon FC	Changwon Football Center, Changwon
19:30 KST	Yun Il-lok 26' (yellow card) 30' (yellow-red card) 66'		Jung Sung-min (yellow card) 19' (yellow-red card) 36'	Attendance: 1,486

20 June 2012	Jeonbuk Hyundai Motors	1–0	Jeonnam Dragons	Jeonju World Cup Stadium, Jeonju
19:00 KST	Lee Dong-gook 44'			Attendance: 5,773

20 June 2012	Jeju United	2–0	Daegu FC	Jeju World Cup Stadium, Seogwipo
19:00 KST	Seo Dong-hyun 32'; Júnior Santos 87'			Attendance: 853

20 June 2012	Seongnam Ilhwa Chunma	1–2	Ulsan Hyundai	Tancheon Sports Complex, Seongnam
19:00 KST	Éverton Santos 6'		Kim Shin-wook 88'; Maranhão 90+1'	Attendance: 2,849

20 June 2012	FC Seoul	0–2	Suwon Samsung Bluewings	Seoul World Cup Stadium, Seoul
19:30 KST	Kim Jin-kyu (yellow card) 2' (red card) 90+4'		Kim Ju-young 40' (o.g.); Ristić 53'	Attendance: 14,853

20 June 2012	Incheon United	2–2 (a.e.t.) (3–4 p)	Goyang KB Kookmin Bank	Incheon Football Stadium, Incheon
19:30 KST	Kim Jae-woong 12', 44'		Ha Jung-heon 31'; Jung Da-seul 72'	Attendance: 1,120
	Penalties
	Ivo (penalty scored); Joo Hyun-jae (penalty missed); Kim Tae-yoon (penalty missed); Koo Bon-sang (penalty scored); Nam Il-woo (penalty scored); Choi Jong-hoan (penalty missed)		(penalty scored) Lee Sang-woo; (penalty scored) Lee Su-hwan; (penalty scored) Park Byung-won; (penalty missed) Park Sung-jin; (penalty missed) Lee Jae-won; (penalty scored) Hwang Ho-ryoung

20 June 2012	Daejeon Citizen	2–2 (a.e.t.) (4–2 p)	Sangju Sangmu Phoenix	Daejeon World Cup Stadium, Daejeon
19:00 KST	Kang Woo-ram 26'; Oris 107'		Alessandro 67' (o.g.); Lee Sung-jae 98'	Attendance: 1,055
	Penalties
	Kim Tae-yeon (penalty scored); Kim Chang-hoon (penalty scored); Han Geuru (penalty scored); Alessandro (penalty scored)		(penalty scored) Kim Chi-gon; (penalty missed) Bang Dae-jong; (penalty scored) Choi Hyo-jin; (penalty missed) Kim Yong-tae

20 June 2012	Pohang Steelers	3–1	Gwangju FC	Pohang Steel Yard, Pohang
19:00 KST	No Byung-jun 22', 90+2'; Ko Mu-yeol 59'		Park Jeong-min 43'	Attendance: 2,875

=== Quarter-finals ===
The draw for the quarterfinals was held on 2 July 2012.

1 August 2012	Pohang Steelers	3–2	Jeonbuk Hyundai Motors	Pohang Steel Yard, Pohang
19:30 KST	Noh Byung-joon 12'; Kim Gwang-seok 38'; Hwang Jin-sung 74'		Lee Dong-gook 5'; Seo Sang-min 62'

1 August 2012	Daejeon Citizen	1–2	Jeju United	Daejeon World Cup Stadium, Daejeon
19:30 KST	Oris 89'		Seo Dong-hyun 9'; Bae Il-hwan 41'

1 August 2012	Gyeongnam FC	1–1 (4–2 p)	Suwon Samsung Bluewings	Changwon Football Center, Changwon
19:30 KST	Kang Seung-jo 68'		Éverton Cardoso 4'
	Penalties
	Caíque (penalty scored); DeVere (penalty scored); Lee Jae-an (penalty scored); Choi Hyun-yeon (penalty scored)		(penalty missed) Bosnar; (penalty scored) Park Hyun-beom; (penalty scored) Choi Jae-soo; (penalty missed) Cho Dong-geon

1 August 2012	Ulsan Hyundai	6–1	Goyang KB Kookmin Bank	Ulsan Munsu Football Stadium, Ulsan
19:30 KST	Kim Shin-wook 7'; Maranhão 45' 63'; Lee Keun-ho 60'; Rafinha 84'; Go Seul-ki 89'		Lee Jae-won 87'

=== Semi-finals ===
The draw for the semifinals was held on 6 August 2012.

1 September 2012	Ulsan Hyundai	0–3	Gyeongnam FC	Ulsan Munsu Football Stadium, Ulsan
19:00 KST	Kim Young-kwang (red card) 78'		Kim In-han 4'; Caíque 81'; Yun Il-lok 87'	Attendance: 3,847

1 September 2012	Pohang Steelers	2–1	Jeju United	Pohang Steel Yard, Pohang
19:00 KST	Hwang Jin-sung 3'; Han Yong-su 78' (o.g.)		Jair 18'	Attendance: 16,114

=== Final ===
20 October 2012	Pohang Steelers	1–0 (a.e.t.)	Gyeongnam FC	Pohang Steel Yard, Pohang
14:00 KST	Park Sung-ho 120'

== Awards ==
=== Main awards ===
No Byung-jun scored the most goals among all participants with 3 goals, but only the top goalscorer with 4 or more goals could qualify for the top goalscorer award under the rule of the KFA.

Award	Winner	Team
Most Valuable Player	(South Korea) Hwang Ji-soo	Pohang Steelers
Top goalscorer	Not awarded	
Best Manager	(South Korea) Hwang Sun-hong	Pohang Steelers

=== Man of the Round ===
Round	Winner	Team
First round	(South Korea) Kim Sang-pil	Sungkyunkwan University
Second round	(South Korea) Kwon Soon-hak	Mokpo City
Round of 32	(South Korea) Lee Jae-won	Goyang KB Kookmin Bank
Round of 16	(South Korea) No Byung-jun	Pohang Steelers
Quarter-finals	(South Korea) Hwang Jin-sung	Pohang Steelers
Semi-finals	(South Korea) Kim In-han	Gyeongnam FC

== See also ==
- 2012 in South Korean football
- 2012 K League
- 2012 Korea National League
- 2012 Challengers League
- 2012 U-League
