= 2012 Challengers League =

Daum Challengers League
- Season: 2012
- Dates: 3 March – 24 November 2012
- Champions: FC Pocheon (2nd title)
- Matches: 228
- Goals: 996 (4.37 per match)
- Best Player: Kang Seok-gu
- Top goalscorer: Seo Dong-hyeon (31 goals)
- Best goalkeeper: Kang Jae-wook

The 2012 Challengers League was the sixth season of the amateur K3 League in South Korea.

The Challengers League maintained a home-and-away season divided into two groups and a one-time interleague play. The winners and runners-up of both groups qualified for the championship playoffs just like as in previous seasons. On the basis of the overall standings, however, the third and fourth-placed clubs entered the first round, while the second and first-placed clubs directly advanced to the semi-finals and final respectively.

18 clubs participated in this season after Jungnang Chorus Mustang and Paju Citizen joined the league. Asan Citizen moved its city to Yesan before the start of the season, and changed its name to Yesan Citizen.

== Teams ==
| Club | City | Stadium | Manager |
|---|---|---|---|
| Bucheon FC 1995 | Bucheon | Bucheon Stadium | (South Korea) Gwak Kyung-keun |
| Cheonan FC | Cheonan | Cheonan Football Center | (South Korea) Park Yoon-ki |
| Cheongju Jikji | Cheongju | Cheongju Stadium | (South Korea) Kim Jong-hyun |
| Chuncheon FC | Chuncheon | Chuncheon Stadium | (South Korea) Ham Cheol-kwon |
| Goyang Citizen | Goyang | Goyang Eoulimnuri ground | (South Korea) Kim Jin-ok |
| Gwangju Gwangsan | Gwangju | Honam University ground | (South Korea) Hwang Young-woo |
| Gyeongju Citizen | Gyeongju | Gyeongju Civic Stadium | (South Korea) Kim Jin-hyung |
| Icheon Citizen | Icheon | Icheon City Stadium | (South Korea) Lee Hyun-chang |
| Jeonju EM | Jeonju | Jeonju University ground | (South Korea) Oh In-eui |
| Jungnang Chorus Mustang | Seoul | Jungnang Public Ground | (South Korea) Kim Sang-hwa |
| Namyangju United | Namyangju | Namyangju Stadium | (South Korea) Lee Jong-woon |
| Paju Citizen | Paju | Paju Stadium | (South Korea) Cho Deok-jeung |
| FC Pocheon | Pocheon | Pocheon Stadium | (South Korea) Lee Su-sik |
| Seoul FC Martyrs | Seoul | Gangbuk Stadium | (South Korea) Yoo Bong-ki |
| Seoul United | Seoul | Madeul Stadium | (South Korea) Bae Hyung-ryul |
| Yangju Citizen | Yangju | Yangju Stadium | (South Korea) Kim Jong-boo |
| Yeonggwang FC | Yeonggwang | Yeonggwang Sportium | (South Korea) Kim Han-bong |
| Yesan Citizen | Yesan | Yesan Stadium | (South Korea) Choi Jong-duk |

== Regular season ==
=== Group A ===
Locations of the 2012 K3 League Group A teams

| Pos | Team | Pld | W | D | L | GF | GA | GD | Pts | Qualification |
|---|---|---|---|---|---|---|---|---|---|---|
| 1 | FC Pocheon | 25 | 20 | 2 | 3 | 101 | 24 | +77 | 62 | Qualification for the playoffs and the FA Cup first round |
| 2 | Chuncheon FC | 25 | 18 | 4 | 3 | 62 | 25 | +37 | 58 | Qualification for the playoffs and the FA Cup first round |
| 3 | Icheon Citizen | 25 | 17 | 2 | 6 | 73 | 28 | +45 | 53 | |
| 4 | Yeonggwang FC | 25 | 9 | 5 | 11 | 45 | 38 | +7 | 32 | |
| 5 | Jeonju EM | 25 | 8 | 4 | 13 | 51 | 55 | −4 | 28 | |
| 6 | Gwangju Gwangsan | 25 | 8 | 4 | 13 | 47 | 68 | −21 | 28 | |
| 7 | Jungnang Chorus Mustang | 26 | 6 | 3 | 17 | 33 | 75 | −42 | 21 | |
| 8 | Namyangju United (Note: Namyangju Citizen were deducted 1 point.) | 25 | 2 | 1 | 22 | 28 | 115 | −87 | 6 | |
| 9 | Seoul FC Martyrs | 25 | 0 | 2 | 23 | 28 | 155 | −127 | 2 | |

Source: KFA (in Korean)
Rules for classification: 1) Points; 2) Goal difference; 3) Goals scored.

=== Group B ===
Locations of the 2012 K3 League Group B teams

| Pos | Team | Pld | W | D | L | GF | GA | GD | Pts | Qualification |
|---|---|---|---|---|---|---|---|---|---|---|
| 1 | Paju Citizen | 25 | 15 | 5 | 5 | 61 | 34 | +27 | 50 | Qualification for the playoffs and the FA Cup first round |
| 2 | Cheongju Jikji | 25 | 14 | 7 | 4 | 72 | 30 | +42 | 49 | Qualification for the playoffs and the FA Cup first round |
| 3 | Yangju Citizen | 25 | 14 | 4 | 7 | 79 | 51 | +28 | 46 | |
| 4 | Gyeongju Citizen | 25 | 12 | 7 | 6 | 48 | 30 | +18 | 43 | |
| 5 | Bucheon FC 1995 | 25 | 12 | 5 | 8 | 52 | 29 | +23 | 41 | |
| 6 | Seoul United | 25 | 11 | 5 | 9 | 62 | 56 | +6 | 38 | |
| 7 | Cheonan FC | 25 | 7 | 10 | 8 | 44 | 43 | +1 | 31 | |
| 8 | Yesan United | 25 | 8 | 2 | 15 | 58 | 72 | −14 | 26 | |
| 9 | Goyang Citizen (Note: Goyang Citizen were deducted 1 point.) | 25 | 5 | 7 | 13 | 44 | 60 | −16 | 21 | |

Source: KFA (in Korean)
Rules for classification: 1) Points; 2) Goal difference; 3) Goals scored.

=== Overall table ===
| Pos | Team | Pld | W | D | L | GF | GA | GD | Pts | Qualification |
|---|---|---|---|---|---|---|---|---|---|---|
| 1 | FC Pocheon | 25 | 20 | 2 | 3 | 101 | 24 | +77 | 62 | Qualification for the playoffs final |
| 2 | Chuncheon FC | 25 | 18 | 4 | 3 | 62 | 25 | +37 | 58 | Qualification for the playoffs semi-final |
| 3 | Paju Citizen | 25 | 15 | 5 | 5 | 61 | 34 | +27 | 50 | Qualification for the playoffs first round |
| 4 | Cheongju Jikji | 25 | 14 | 7 | 4 | 72 | 30 | +42 | 49 | Qualification for the playoffs first round |
| 5 | Icheon Citizen | 25 | 17 | 2 | 6 | 73 | 27 | +46 | 53 | Qualification for the FA Cup first round |
| 6 | Yangju Citizen | 25 | 14 | 4 | 7 | 79 | 51 | +28 | 46 | Qualification for the FA Cup first round |
| 7 | Gyeongju Citizen | 25 | 12 | 7 | 6 | 48 | 30 | +18 | 43 | Qualification for the FA Cup first round |
| 8 | Bucheon FC 1995 (P) | 25 | 12 | 5 | 8 | 52 | 29 | +23 | 41 | Qualification for the K League Challenge and the FA Cup second round |
| 9 | Seoul United | 25 | 11 | 5 | 9 | 62 | 56 | +6 | 38 | Qualification for the FA Cup first round |
| 10 | Yeonggwang FC | 25 | 9 | 5 | 11 | 45 | 38 | +7 | 32 | Qualification for the FA Cup first round |
| 11 | Cheonan FC | 25 | 7 | 10 | 8 | 44 | 43 | +1 | 31 | Qualification for the FA Cup first round |
| 12 | Jeonju EM | 25 | 8 | 4 | 13 | 51 | 55 | −4 | 28 | Qualification for the FA Cup first round |
| 13 | Gwangju Gwangsan | 25 | 8 | 4 | 13 | 47 | 68 | −21 | 28 | Qualification for the FA Cup first round |
| 14 | Yesan United | 25 | 8 | 2 | 15 | 57 | 72 | −15 | 26 | |
| 15 | Goyang Citizen | 25 | 5 | 7 | 13 | 44 | 60 | −16 | 21 | |
| 16 | Jungnang Chorus Mustang | 25 | 6 | 2 | 17 | 33 | 75 | −42 | 20 | |
| 17 | Namyangju United | 25 | 2 | 1 | 22 | 31 | 120 | −89 | 6 | |
| 18 | Seoul FC Martyrs | 25 | 0 | 2 | 23 | 33 | 158 | −125 | 2 | |

Source: KFA Soccerway
Rules for classification: 1) Points; 2) Goal difference; 3) Goals scored.
(P) Promoted

== Championship playoffs ==
=== Bracket ===
First round
3 | Paju Citizen (p) | 1 (5)
4 | Cheongju Jikji | 1 (4)

Semi-final
2 | Chuncheon FC | 3
Paju Citizen | 2

Final
1 | FC Pocheon | 1
Chuncheon FC | 0

=== First round ===
10 November 2012
15:00

| Paju Citizen | 1–1 (a.e.t.) | Cheongju Jikji |
|---|---|---|
| Kim Su-won 86' | Highlights; Report | Kim Hee-jung 90+2' |
Penalties
| Jo Jae-seok (penalty missed); Park Han-woong (penalty missed); Yoo Seung-moo (penalty scored); ? (penalty scored); ? (penalty scored); No. 10 (penalty scored); Lee Ji-ho (penalty scored) | 5–4 | (penalty scored) No. 8; (penalty scored) Ahn Seung-hoon; (penalty missed) Shin Kang-seon; (penalty scored) ?; (penalty missed) Ahn Joong-hoon; (penalty scored) Lee Joon-hee; (penalty missed) Jang Bong-gu |

Paju Public Stadium

=== Semi-final ===
17 November 2012
14:00

| Chuncheon FC | 3–2 | Paju Citizen |
|---|---|---|
| Lee Kang-min 10'; Yoon Chul-soon 40'; Sun Min-su 56' | | Jung Sung-jo 69'; Choi Hyun-seo 73' |

Chuncheon Stadium

=== Final ===
24 November 2012
14:00

| FC Pocheon | 1–0 | Chuncheon FC |
|---|---|---|
| Kang Seok-gu 65' |

Pocheon Stadium

== See also ==
- 2012 in South Korean football
- 2012 Challengers Cup
- 2012 Korean FA Cup
