= K4 League =

South Korean association football league

- Organising body: Korea Football Association
- Founded: 2020; 6 years ago
- Country: South Korea
- Number of clubs: 13
- Level on pyramid: 4
- Promotion to: K3 League
- Domestic cup: Korean FA Cup
- Current champions: Jinju Citizen (2026)
- Most championships: Paju Citizen; Pocheon Citizen; Goyang KH; Yeoju FC; Jeonbuk Hyundai Motors B Dangjin Citizen; Jinju Citizen (1 title each)
- Broadcasters: Naver Sports; STN Sports; Afreeca TV
- Website: kfa.or.kr (in Korean)
- Current: 2026 K4 League

The K4 League (Korean: K4리그) is the fourth-highest division in the South Korean football league system. It is regarded as the successor to the K3 League Basic, the second division of amateur K3 League founded in 2017.

Since 2021, Korea Football Association has allowed reserve teams of the K League to join the K4 League.

== Competition format ==
All participating clubs play home and away season in the K4 League. The promotion and relegation system exists between the K3 League and the K4 League, but does not exist between the K4 League and the amateur K5 League, although there are plans to implement it by 2027.

For the 2025 season, the winner of the league will be crowned champions without a playoff and gain automatic promotion. The 2nd-placed team may gain promotion via a two-game playoff series against the 14th-place team in the 2025 K3 League.

Also for the 2025 season, and following the example of K League, match day squad lists have increased from 18 to 20 players. At least three players must be Korean nationals, aged 23 or younger, and at least one of the three must be in the starting eleven. The Asian player quota has been removed, and teams may now include 4 foreign players of any nationality.

K4 League teams are allowed to recruit professional players who choose to do social service instead of military service.

== Clubs ==
=== Current clubs ===
Team	City	Stadium	Manager	First season	Current spell	Seasons (Note: As of the start of the 2026 season.)	Last title
Geoje Citizen	Geoje	Geoje Stadium	(South Korea) Song Hong-sub	2021	2021–	6	—
Geumsan Insam	Geumsan County	Geumsan Sports Complex	(South Korea) Lee Young-min	2026	2026–	1 (debut)	—
Gijang United	Gijang County	Jeongwan Sports Healing Park	(South Korea) Choi Jin-han	2025	2025–	2	—
Haman FC	Haman County	Haman Public Stadium	(South Korea) Oh Hwi-seong	2026	2026–	1 (debut)	—
Jecheon Citizen	Jecheon	Jecheon Stadium	(South Korea) Han Sang-gu	2026	2026–	1 (debut)	—
Jincheon HR	Jincheon County	Saenggeo-Jincheon Sports Complex	(South Korea) Yoo Sang-soo	2026	2026–	1 (debut)	—
Jinju Citizen	Jinju	Jinju Stadium	(South Korea) Lee Chang-yub	2020	2020–	7	—
Namyangju FC	Namyangju	Namyangju Stadium	(South Korea) Kim Sung-il	2024	2024–	3	—
Pyeongchang United	Pyeongchang	Pyeongchang Stadium	(South Korea) Shin Gi-dong	2021	2021–	6	—
Pyeongtaek Citizen	Pyeongtaek	Sosabeol Reports Town	(South Korea) Yoon Sang-chul	2022	2022–	5	—
Sejong SA	Sejong	Sejong Central Park Soccer Field; Sejong Civic Stadium	(South Korea) Kim Jong-pil	2025	2025–	2	—
Seoul Jungnang	Seoul	Jungnang Public Ground	(South Korea) Kim Beom-soo	2020	2020–	7	—
Seosan Pioneer	Seosan	Seosan City Stadium	(South Korea) Lee Jung-jae	2026	2026–	1 (debut)	—

=== Suspended clubs ===
Team	City	Stadium	Manager	First season	Current spell	Seasons	Last title
Seoul Nowon United FC	Seoul	Nowon Madeul Stadium		2007-2024	2027–	18	—
Yangju Citizen	Yangju	Yangju Stadium	(South Korea) Oh Hwi-seong	—	—	0	—

=== Former clubs ===
The following clubs are not in the K4 League as of the 2026 season.

Club	Last season	Reason
Paju Citizen	2020	Promoted to K3 League
Ulsan Citizen	2020	Promoted to K3 League
Pocheon Citizen	2021	Promoted to K3 League
Siheung Citizen	2021	Promoted to K3 League
Yangpyeong FC	2022	Promoted to K3 League
Chuncheon Citizen	2022	Promoted to K3 League
Yeoju FC	2023	Promoted to K3 League
Jeonbuk Hyundai Motors B	2024	Promoted to K3 League
Dangjin Citizen	2025	Promoted to K3 League
Icheon Citizen	2020	Dissolved
Goyang Citizen	2021	Dissolved
FC Namdong	2022	Dissolved
Goyang KH	2022	Dissolved
Busan IPark Futures	2023	Dissolved
Gangwon FC B	2023	Dissolved
Goyang Happiness	2023	Dissolved
Daejeon Hana Citizen B	2024	Dissolved
Jeonju Citizen	2024	Dissolved
FC Sejong	2024	Dissolved
Seoul Nowon United	2024	Dissolved
Yeoncheon FC	2025	Dissolved
Daegu FC B	2025	Dissolved

== Champions ==
=== Champions by season ===
Season	Champions	Runners-up
2020	Paju Citizen	Ulsan Citizen
2021	Pocheon Citizen	Siheung Citizen
2022	Goyang KH	Yangpyeong FC
2023	Yeoju FC	Daegu FC B
2024	Jeonbuk Hyundai Motors B	Daejeon Hana Citizen B
2025	Dangjin Citizen	Namyangju FC
2026	Jinju Citizen	Jincheon HR
2027		

=== Performance by club ===
Club	Champions	Runners-up	Seasons won	Seasons runner-up
Paju Citizen	1	0	2020	—
Pocheon Citizen	1	0	2021	—
Goyang KH	1	0	2022	—
Yeoju FC	1	0	2023	—
Jeonbuk Hyundai Motors B	1	0	2024	—
Dangjin Citizen	1	0	2025	—
Jinju Citizen	1	0	2026	—
Ulsan Citizen	0	1	—	2020
Siheung Citizen	0	1	—	2021
Yangpyeong FC	0	1	—	2022
Daegu FC B	0	1	—	2023
Daejeon Hana Citizen B	0	1	—	2024
Namyangju FC	0	1	—	2025
Jincheon HR	0	1	—	2026

== See also ==
- K3 League
- K3 League (2007–2019)
- South Korean football league system
