= Challengers Cup =

South Korean football competition

- Organiser(s): Korea Football Association
- Founded: 2011
- Abolished: 2012
- Region: South Korea
- Teams: 15
- Most championships: Icheon Citizen (2 titles)

The Challengers Cup is a defunct South Korean football competition and the league cup of Challengers League (amateur K3 League). It was held twice in 2011 and 2012 as a single-elimination tournament by Korea Football Association, and was contested by K3 League clubs. Icheon Citizen won both competitions.

== Finals ==
Season	Champions	Score	Runners-up
2011	Icheon Citizen	1–1 (a.e.t.) (4–3 p)	Gyeongju Citizen
2012	Icheon Citizen	3–0	Pocheon Citizen

== See also ==
- K3 League (2007–2019)
