= KOVO Cup =

Korean volleyball competition

The KOVO Cup is a professional volleyball competition in Korea hosted by the Korea Volleyball Federation (KOVO). This competition is played in a format of round-robin matches followed by a knock-out stage as the CEV Champions League. It is held from July to September before the V-League. The competition is held in a centralized venue each year.

== Finals ==
=== Men ===
Season	Champions	Score	Runners-up	Venue	Ref
2006	Hyundai Capital	3–1	Samsung Fire	Yangsan Gymnasium	
2007	Korean Air	3–2	KB Insurance	Masan Gymnasium	
2008	Hyundai Capital	3–2	Samsung Fire	Yangsan Gymnasium	
2009	Samsung Fire	3–2	Hyundai Capital	Busan Sajik Arena	
2010	Hyundai Capital	3–0	Korean Air	Suwon Gymnasium	
2011	Korean Air	3–0	Woori Capital	Suwon Gymnasium	
2012	LIG Insurance	3–0	Samsung Fire	Suwon Gymnasium	
2013	Hyundai Capital	3–1	Woori Card	Ansan Sangnoksu Arena	
2014	Korean Air	3–0	Woori Card	Ansan Sangnoksu Arena	
2015	Woori Card	3–1	OK Savings Bank	Cheongju Gymnasium	
2016	KEPCO	3–1	KB Insurance	Cheongju Gymnasium	
2017	KEPCO	3–1	Woori Card	Yu Gwansun Gymnasium	
2018	Samsung Fire	3–0	KB Insurance	Jecheon Gymnasium	
2019	Korean Air	3–0	OK Savings Bank	Suncheon Palma Gymnasium	
2020	KEPCO	3–2	Korean Air	Jecheon Gymnasium	
2021	Woori Card	3–0	OK Financial Group	Uijeongbu Gymnasium	
2022	Korean Air	3–0	KEPCO	Suncheon Palma Gymnasium	
2023	OK Financial Group	3–1	Samsung Fire	Gumi Park Jeong Hee Gymnasium	
2024	Hyundai Capital	3–2	Korean Air		

=== Women ===
Season	Champions	Score	Runners-up	Venue	Ref
2006	Hyundai E&C	3–2; 3–0	Korea Expressway	Yangsan Gymnasium	
2007	GS Caltex	3–0	KT&G	Masan Gymnasium	
2008	KT&G	3–0	Korea Expressway	Yangsan Gymnasium	
2009	Tianjin Bohai	3–2	Hyundai E&C	Busan Sajik Arena	
2010	Heungkuk Life	3–0	Korea Expressway	Suwon Gymnasium	
2011	Korea Expressway	3–2	KGC	Suwon Gymnasium	
2012	GS Caltex	3–1	IBK	Suwon Gymnasium	
2013	IBK	3–0	Hyundai E&C	Ansan Sangnoksu Arena	
2014	Hyundai E&C	3–1	GS Caltex	Ansan Sangnoksu Arena	
2015	IBK	3–2	Hyundai E&C	Cheongju Gymnasium	
2016	IBK	3–0	KGC	Cheongju Gymnasium	
2017	GS Caltex	3–1	Korea Expressway	Yu Gwansun Gymnasium	
2018	KGC	3–2	GS Caltex	Boryeong Gymnasium	
2019	Hyundai E&C	3–2	KGC	Suncheon Palma Gymnasium	
2020	GS Caltex	3–0	Heungkuk Life	Jecheon Gymnasium	
2021	Hyundai E&C	3–0	GS Caltex	Uijeongbu Gymnasium	
2022	GS Caltex	3–0	Korea Expressway	Suncheon Palma Gymnasium	
2023	GS Caltex	3–1	IBK	Gumi Park Chung Hee Gymnasium	
2024	Hyundai E&C	3–1	Daejeon CheongKwanJang Red Sparks	Tongyeong Gymnasium	

== Championships by teams ==
=== Men ===
~2024

Team	Champions	Runners-up	Years (Champions)	Years (Runners-up)
Incheon Korean Air Jumbos	5	3	2007, 2011, 2014, 2019, 2022	2010, 2020, 2024
Cheonan Hyundai Capital Skywalkers	5	1	2006, 2008, 2010, 2013, 2024	2009
Suwon KEPCO Vixtorm	3	1	2016, 2017, 2020	2022
Seoul Woori Card WooriWON	2	4	2015, 2021	2011, 2013, 2014, 2017
Daejeon Samsung Fire Bluefangs	2	4	2009, 2018	2006, 2008, 2012,2023
Uijeongbu KB Insurance Stars	1	3	2012	2007, 2016, 2018
Ansan OK Financial Group Okman	1	3	2023	2015, 2019, 2021

=== Women ===
~2023

Team	Champions	Runners-up	Years (Champions)	Years (Runners-up)
GS Caltex Seoul KIXX	6	3	2007, 2012, 2017, 2020, 2022, 2023	2014, 2018, 2021
Suwon Hyundai E&C Hillstate	5	3	2006, 2014, 2019, 2021, 2024	2009, 2013, 2015
Hwaseong IBK Altos	3	2	2013, 2015, 2016	2012, 2023
Daejeon KGC	2	5	2008, 2018	2007, 2011, 2016, 2019, 2024
Korea Expressway Corporation Hi-Pass	1	5	2011	2006, 2008, 2010, 2017, 2022
Incheon Heungkuk Life Pink Spiders	1	1	2010	2020
Tianjin Bohai	1	0	2009	—

== See also ==
- V-League (South Korea)
