= 2011 Challengers League =

Daum Challengers League
- Season: 2011
- Dates: 5 March - 13 November 2011
- Champions: Gyeongju Citizen (2nd title)
- Matches: 180
- Goals: 668 (3.71 per match)
- Best Player: Kim Min-seop

The 2011 Challengers League was the fifth season of the amateur K3 League. For this season, the K3 League was renamed the "Challengers League", and 16 clubs participated after Samcheok Shinwoo Electronics and Yongin Citizen withdrew from the league. The participating clubs were divided into two groups, and the winners and runners-up of both groups qualified for the championship playoffs. All clubs had interleague play once after playing home and away season in each group.

== Regular season ==
=== Group A ===
Locations of the 2011 K3 League Group A teams

| Pos | Team | Pld | W | D | L | GF | GA | GD | Pts | Qualification |
|---|---|---|---|---|---|---|---|---|---|---|
| 1 | Yangju Citizen | 22 | 15 | 5 | 2 | 52 | 28 | +24 | 50 | Qualification for the playoffs |
| 2 | Gyeongju Citizen | 22 | 13 | 6 | 3 | 57 | 24 | +33 | 45 | Qualification for the playoffs |
| 3 | Bucheon FC 1995 | 22 | 8 | 5 | 9 | 37 | 31 | +6 | 29 | Qualification for the FA Cup first round |
| 4 | Jeonju EM | 22 | 7 | 8 | 7 | 28 | 34 | −6 | 29 | Qualification for the FA Cup first round |
| 5 | Seoul United | 22 | 7 | 5 | 10 | 44 | 46 | −2 | 26 | Qualification for the FA Cup first round |
| 6 | Namyangju United | 22 | 5 | 5 | 12 | 41 | 57 | −16 | 20 | |
| 7 | Yeonggwang FC | 22 | 4 | 3 | 15 | 26 | 51 | −25 | 15 | |
| 8 | Asan Citizen | 22 | 3 | 6 | 13 | 37 | 72 | −35 | 15 | |

Source: KFA Soccerway
Rules for classification: 1) Points; 2) Goal difference; 3) Goals scored.

=== Group B ===
Locations of the 2011 K3 League Group B teams

| Pos | Team | Pld | W | D | L | GF | GA | GD | Pts | Qualification |
|---|---|---|---|---|---|---|---|---|---|---|
| 1 | Icheon Citizen | 22 | 15 | 4 | 3 | 75 | 26 | +49 | 49 | Qualification for the playoffs |
| 2 | FC Pocheon | 22 | 14 | 6 | 2 | 49 | 22 | +27 | 48 | Qualification for the playoffs |
| 3 | Chuncheon FC | 22 | 13 | 4 | 5 | 38 | 23 | +15 | 43 | Qualification for the FA Cup first round |
| 4 | Cheongju FC | 22 | 11 | 7 | 4 | 43 | 25 | +18 | 40 | Qualification for the FA Cup first round |
| 5 | Seoul FC Martyrs | 22 | 9 | 3 | 10 | 43 | 56 | −13 | 30 | Qualification for the FA Cup first round |
| 6 | Cheonan FC | 22 | 6 | 2 | 14 | 38 | 54 | −16 | 20 | |
| 7 | Gwangju Gwangsan | 22 | 4 | 5 | 13 | 29 | 56 | −27 | 17 | |
| 8 | Goyang Citizen | 22 | 3 | 4 | 15 | 24 | 56 | −32 | 13 | |

Source: KFA Soccerway
Rules for classification: 1) Points; 2) Goal difference; 3) Goals scored.

== Championship playoffs ==
=== Bracket ===
Semi-finals
Yangju Citizen (p) | 1 (4)
FC Pocheon | 1 (3)
Icheon Citizen | 0 (2)
Gyeongju Citizen (p) | 0 (4)

Final
Yangju Citizen | 1 | 2 | 3
Gyeongju Citizen | 1 | 3 | 4

=== Semi-finals ===
29 October 2011
14:00 KST

| Yangju Citizen | 1–1 (a.e.t.) | FC Pocheon |
|---|---|---|
| Choi Young-nam 50' | | Choi Kyung-sik 62' |
Penalties
| | 4–3 |

Yangju Godeok Stadium, Yangju

29 October 2011
14:00 KST

| Icheon Citizen | 0–0 (a.e.t.) | Gyeongju Citizen |
Penalties
| | 2–4 |

Icheon City Stadium, Icheon

=== Final ===
5 November 2011
14:00 KST

| Yangju Citizen | 1–1 | Gyeongju Citizen |
|---|---|---|
| Park Sang-yong 73' | | Yoon Chul-soon 12' |

Yangju Godeok Stadium, Yangju

13 November 2011
12:00 KST

| Gyeongju Citizen | 3–2 | Yangju Citizen |
|---|---|---|
| Kim Min-seop 60', 84'; Choi Jin-seok 89' | | Choi Young-nam 24'; Park Sang-yong 30' |

Gyeongju Stadium, Gyeongju

Gyeongju Citizen won 4–3 on aggregate.

=== Final table ===
| Pos | Team | Qualification |
|---|---|---|
| 1 | Gyeongju Citizen (C) | Qualification for the FA Cup second round |
| 2 | Yangju Citizen | Qualification for the FA Cup first round |
| 3 | Icheon Citizen | Qualification for the FA Cup first round |
| 4 | FC Pocheon | Qualification for the FA Cup first round |

Source: RSSSF
(C) Champions

== See also ==
- 2011 in South Korean football
- 2011 Challengers Cup
- 2011 Korean FA Cup
