= Seosan City Stadium =

Sports venue in Seosan, South Korea

Coordinates: 36°47′51.61″N 126°26′3.91″E

Seosan City Stadium is a multi-use stadium in Seosan, South Korea. It is currently used mostly for football matches and is the home stadium of Seosan Citizen and K4 League new club, Seosan Pioneer. The stadium has a capacity of 10,000 people and opened in 2001.
