= Kim Dae-kwang =

South Korean footballer (born 1992)

Personal information
- Date of birth: 10 April 1992 (age 34)
- Place of birth: South Korea
- Height: 1.77 m (5 ft 10 in)
- Position: Midfielder

Youth career
- 1. FC Nürnberg

Senior career*
Years	Team	Apps	(Gls)
2015	Ulsan Hyundai Mipo Dockyard	15	(0)
2016	Bucheon FC 1995	2	(0)
2017	Seoul E-Land	6	(1)
2018-2019	Changwon City	24	(0)
2020	Goyang Citizen FC		
- * Club domestic league appearances and goals

Kim Dae-kwang (Korean: 김대광; born 10 April 1992) is a South Korean footballer who is last known to have played as a midfielder for Goyang Citizen FC.

== Career ==
Ad a youth player, Kim was nicknamed "the devil's talent" and joined the youth academy of German side 1. FC Nürnberg through a Korea Football Association program. Before the 2015 season, he signed for Ulsan Hyundai Mipo Dockyard in the South Korean third division. Before the 2016 season, Kim signed for South Korean second division club Bucheon FC 1995, where he made 3 appearances and 0 goals. On 1 June 2016, he debuted for Bucheon FC 1995 during a 0-0 draw with Chungnam Asan. Before the 2018 season, Kim signed for Changwon City in the South Korean third division. Before the 2020 season, he signed for South Korean fourth division team Goyang Citizen FC.
