= Lee Jung-yong =

South Korean footballer (born 1982 or 1983)

Personal information
- Date of birth: July 6, 1983 (age 43)
- Place of birth: Mokpo, South Korea
- Height: 1.77 m (5 ft 10 in)
- Position: Midfielder

Team information
- Current team: Sisaket FC

Youth career
- Yonsei University

Senior career*
Years	Team	Apps	(Gls)
2004	Ulsan Hyundai Horang-i	0	(0)
2005–2006	Slaven Belupo	13	(0)
2006–2007	NK Naftaš HAŠK	13	(2)
2007–2009	Seongnam Ilhwa Chunma	0	(0)
2009–2010	Ulsan Hyundai	4	(1)
2010–	Sisaket FC		
- * Club domestic league appearances and goals as of July 10, 2008

- Lee Jung-yong
- Hangul: 이정용
- Hanja: 李貞龍
- RR: I Jeongyong
- MR: I Chŏngyong

Lee Jung-yong (born July 6, 1982/1983; Korean: 이정용) is a South Korean footballer who plays as a midfielder for Sisaket FC in the Thai Premier League.

His previous clubs were Ulsan Hyundai Horang-i in the K League and Slaven Belupo and NK Naftaš HAŠK in Croatia.

== Career statistics ==
As of end of 2009 season

Club performance			League		Cup		League Cup		Continental		Total	
Season	Club	League	Apps	Goals	Apps	Goals	Apps	Goals	Apps	Goals	Apps	Goals
South Korea			League		KFA Cup		League Cup		Asia		Total	
2004	Ulsan Hyundai	K League	0	0	0	0	4	0	-		4	0
Croatia			League		Croatian Cup		League Cup		Europe		Total	
2005–06	Slaven Belupo	Prva HNL	13	0	4	0	0	0	1	0	18	0
2006–07	Naftaš HAŠK	Druga HNL	13	2					-			
South Korea			League		KFA Cup		League Cup		Asia		Total	
2007	Seongnam Ilhwa	K League	0	0	0	0	0	0	-		0	0
2008	Seongnam Ilhwa	K League	0	0	1	0	0	0	-			
2009	Seongnam Ilhwa	K League	0	0	0	0	0	0	-			
2009	Ulsan Mipo Dockyard	Korea National League	4	1	0	0	-		-			
Total	South Korea		4	1	1	0	4	0	-		9	1
Total	Croatia		26	2	4	0	0	0	1	0	31	2
Career total			30	3	5	0	4	0	1	0	40	3
