= Kim Tae-young (footballer, born 1982) =

South Korean footballer

Personal information
- Full name: Kim Tae-young (김태영)
- Date of birth: January 17, 1982 (age 44)
- Place of birth: Anyang, Gyeonggi-do, South Korea
- Height: 1.80 m (5 ft 11 in)
- Position: Defender

Youth career
- 2000–2003: Konkuk University

Senior career*
Years	Team	Apps	(Gls)
2004–2005	Jeonbuk Hyundai Motors	19	(0)
2006–2009	Busan IPark	30	(0)
2010–2012	Yangju FC		
2013	Esan United	18	(0)
2013	Suphanburi	10	(0)
2014	Songkhla United	9	(0)
2014	Ang Thong	0	(0)

International career^{‡}
2004	South Korea U-23	1	(0)
- * Club domestic league appearances and goals as of 31 December 2008 ‡ National team caps and goals as of 31 December 2008

Kim Tae-young (Korean: 김태영; born January 17, 1982) is a South Korean professional footballer playing for Ang Thong. On November 9, 2008, he scored K-League's historic 10,000th goal against his own net.
