= Kim Sang-pil =

South Korean footballer (born 1989)

Personal information
- Full name: Kim Sang-pil
- Date of birth: 26 April 1989 (age 37)
- Place of birth: South Korea
- Height: 1.88 m (6 ft 2 in)
- Position: Centre-back

Team information
- Current team: Asan Mugunghwa

Youth career
- 2009–2012: Sungkyunkwan University

Senior career*
| Years | Team | Apps | (Gls) |
| 2013 | FC Seoul | 0 | (0) |
| 2014–2015 | Daejeon Citizen | 25 | (0) |
| 2016 | Chungju Hummel | 32 | (1) |
| 2017–2018 | Asan Mugunghwa (army) | 5 | (0) |
| 2019 | Mokpo City | 21 | (1) |
| 2020 | Cheonan City | 16 | (3) |
- * Club domestic league appearances and goals as of 1 January 2021

Kim Sang-pil (Korean: 김상필; born 26 April 1989) is a South Korean footballer who plays as centre-back for Asan Mugunghwa in K League 2.

== Career ==
Kim joined K League Classic side FC Seoul in 2013, but made no appearance in his first club.

He moved to Daejeon Citizen in January 2014.

He signed with Chungju Hummel before the 2016 season starts.
