= Na Kwang-hyun =

South Korean footballer

Personal information
- Date of birth: June 21, 1982 (age 44)
- Place of birth: South Korea
- Height: 1.75 m (5 ft 9 in)
- Position: Midfielder

Youth career
- 1998–2000: Moonil High School
- 2001–2004: Myongji University

Senior career*
Years	Team	Apps	(Gls)
2005	Incheon Korail	9	(2)
2006–2009	Daejeon Citizen	41	(2)
2010	Incheon Korail	22	(0)
2013	Trat	3	(1)
Korean name
Hangul	나광현
Hanja	羅光鉉
RR	Na Gwanghyeon
MR	Na Kwanghyŏn
- * Club domestic league appearances and goals

Na Kwang-hyun (born 21 June 1982) is a South Korean football player who formerly played for Trat F.C.
