= Park Yong-ji =

South Korean footballer (born 1992)

Park Yong-Ji
Personal information
- Full name: Park Yong-Ji
- Date of birth: 9 October 1992 (age 34)
- Place of birth: Seoul, South Korea
- Height: 1.83 m (6 ft 0 in)
- Position: Forward

Team information
- Current team: Seongnam FC
- Number: 19

Youth career
- Chung-Ang University

Senior career*
Years	Team	Apps	(Gls)
2013–2014	Ulsan Hyundai	22	(1)
2014–2015	Busan IPark	37	(3)
2015–2017	Seongnam FC	44	(2)
2017–	Incheon United FC	24	(4)
2018–2019	→ Sangju Sangmu (army)	50	(16)
2020	Daejeon Hana Citizen	0	(0)
2021–	Seongnam FC	0	(0)

International career
2011–	South Korea U-23		
- * Club domestic league appearances and goals as of 28 December 2019

Park Yong-Ji (Korean: 박용지; born 9 October 1992) is a South Korean footballer who plays as forward for Seongnam FC.

== Career ==
He joined Ulsan Hyundai from Chung-Ang University on 18 December 2012. He joined Busan in the summer of 2014 in part-exchange along with Kim Yong-Tae, with Yang Dong-Hyun moving in the opposite direction. He scored his first goal for the club on 6 August in a 1–1 draw with Gyeongnam.

== Club career statistics ==
As of 6 April 2015

Club performance			League		Cup		Intercontinental		Total	
Season	Club	League	Apps	Goals	Apps	Goals	Apps	Goals	Apps	Goals
South Korea			League		KFA Cup		Asia		Total	
2013	Ulsan Hyundai	K League 1	16	1	1	0	0	0	17	1
2014	Ulsan Hyundai	K League 1	6	0	1	0	2	0	9	0
2014	Busan IPark	K League 1	21	2	1	0	0	0	22	2
2015	Busan IPark	K League 1	9	1	1	0	0	0	10	1
Career total			52	4	4	0	2	0	58	4
