= Goyang Happiness FC =

2022–2023 football club in South Korea

Goyang Happiness Football Club (Korean: 고양 해피니스 FC) was a South Korean football club based in Goyang.전주시민축구단, 올 시즌 홈경기 첫 승 도전

== History ==
Goyang Happiness FC was founded in 2022.

The club was dissolved on 3 July 2023.
