= Nowon Madeul Stadium =

South Korean stadium

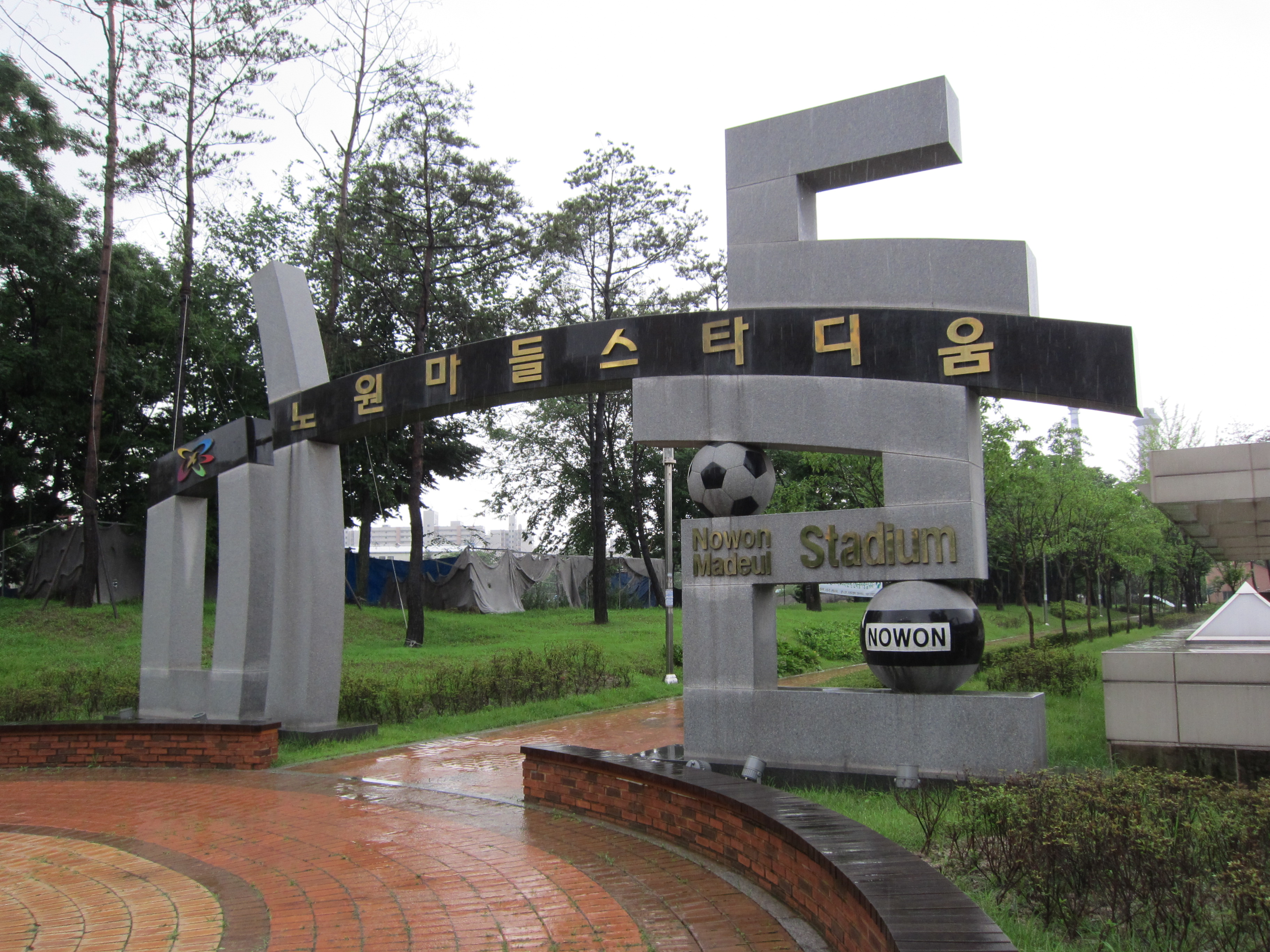
- Interactive map of Nowon Madeul Stadium
- Location: 770-2 Sanggye-dong, Nowon District, Seoul, South Korea
- Coordinates: 37.644167°N 127.057778°E
- Owner: Nowon-gu Management Corporation
- Capacity: 446
- Surface: Artificial turf

Construction
- Groundbreaking: 2006
- Opened: 2008
- Cost: 21 billion won

Tenants
- Nowon Hummel (2008–2009); Seoul Nowon United (2011–2025)

Nowon Madeul Stadium is a multi-purpose stadium in Nowon District, Seoul, South Korea.
