= Icheon Sports Complex =

Sports venue in Icheon, South Korea

Coordinates: 37°17′8.69″N 127°29′48.44″E

- 이천종합운동장
- Interactive map of Icheon Sports Complex
- Address: 1696 Jungbudae-ro, Bubal-eup; Icheon; South Korea

Construction
- Opened: 2001

The Icheon Sports Complex (Korean: 이천종합운동장) is a multi-use stadium in Icheon, South Korea. The stadium opened in 2001 and is currently used mostly for football matches. It has a capacity for 19,428 people.

== History ==
In 1996, the mayor of Icheon announced plans to build a sports complex including facilities for football, athletics, badminton, and basketball, to be completed by the end of 1998. Construction began in 1997 and was eventually completed in 2001.

In 2022, Icheon City announced plans to improve the area around the stadium by painting some parts of the outer wall, adding murals, and installing play equipment for children.

== Structure and facilities ==
The sports complex consists of a main stadium with a football field and athletics track, as well as an artificial football pitch and facilities for tennis, jokgu, basketball, table tennis, inline skating, and dog exercise.

== Tenants ==
The main stadium was the home ground of men's football team Icheon Citizen FC from the team's foundation in 2009 until its disbandment in 2020. It was the home of women's football club Icheon Daekyo from 2015 until its disbandment in 2017.
