= Jecheon Stadium =

Sports venue in Jecheon, South Korea

Coordinates: 37.130008°N 128.217745°E

Jecheon Stadium is a multi-purpose stadium in Jecheon, South Korea. It is currently used mostly for football matches. This home ground of K4 League new club, Jecheon Citizen. The stadium has a capacity of 25,000 people and was built in 1988.
