= Asan United FC =

Asan United FC 아산 유나이티드 FC
- Full name: Asan United Football Club 아산 유나이티드 축구단
- Founded: 2005; 21 years ago
- Dissolved: 2015; 11 years ago
- Ground: Yi Sun-sin Stadium
- Capacity: 19,283
Home colours	Away colours

Asan United Football Club (Korean: 아산 유나이티드 FC) was a South Korean football club based in the city of Asan. It was a founder member of the Challengers League, an amateur league and the third tier of league football in South Korea in 2007. The club was dissolved in 2015 after merging with Cheonan FC.

The club was founded in 2005 as Asan FC. In December 2007, the name of the club was changed to Asan United FC. In March 2009, club's name was changed to Asan Citizen FC. After the 2011 season, the club was relocated to Yesan County near Asan and changed the name. In the 2013 season, the club's name reverted to Asan United FC.

== Season-by-season records ==
Season	Teams	Tier	Placement	Pld	W	D	L	GF	GA	GD	Pts	Manager
2007	10	K3 League	10th	18	2	2	14	18	58	–40	8	
2008	16	K3 League	9th	29	13	3	13	63	73	–10	42	
2009	17	K3 League	16th	32	1	3	28	28	121	–93	6	
2010	18	K3 League	7th in Group A	25	7	1	17	20	65	–45	22	
2011	16	K3 Challengers League	8th in Group A	22	3	6	13	37	73	–36	15	
2012	18	K3 Challengers League	8th in Group B	25	8	2	15	57	72	–15	26	
2013	18	K3 Challengers League	9th in Group B	25	2	4	19	40	87	–47	10	Jung Nam-kil

== See also ==
- List of football clubs in South Korea
