= Yeonggwang FC =

2010–2016 South Korean football club

Yeonggwang FC 영광 FC
- Full name: Yeonggwang Football Club 영광 축구단
- Founded: January 28, 2010; 16 years ago
- Dissolved: 2016; 10 years ago
- Ground: Yeonggwang Sportium
- Capacity: 14,079
- Chairman: Jung Ki-ho (Mayor)
- Manager: Lee Tae-yeop
- League: K3 League
- 2016: 18th
Home colours	Away colours

Yeonggwang Football Club (Korean: 영광 FC), also known as Chunnam Youngkwang FC, was a South Korean football club based in Yeonggwang, South Jeolla. From the 2010 season until its dissolution in 2016, Jeonnam Yeonggwang FC played in the Challengers League, the third tier of Korean football. Yeonggwang FC's home stadium was Yeonggwang Sportium.

== Squad ==
As of 21 September 2016

Note: Flags indicate national team as defined under FIFA eligibility rules; some limited exceptions apply. Players may hold more than one non-FIFA nationality.

No.	Pos.	Nation	Player
—	GK	KOR	Baek Jung-dong
—	DF	KOR	Kim Hoon-tae
—	DF	KOR	Kim Jae-geun
—	DF	KOR	Kim Ji-sung
—	DF	KOR	Kim Seung-yong
—	DF	KOR	Kim Soo-gwang
—	DF	KOR	Uhm Seong-min
—	MF	KOR	Jeon Hyun-seong
—	MF	KOR	Jung Tae-hyun
—	MF	KOR	Kang Jin-tae
—	MF	KOR	Kim Min-wook
—	MF	KOR	Kim Tae-ung
—	MF	KOR	Oh Young-joon
—	MF	KOR	Yoo Hyung-ho
—	FW	KOR	Hwang Chan-ha
—	FW	KOR	Kang Shin-yang
—	FW	KOR	Park Man-jin
—	FW	KOR	Song Min-woo

== Managers ==
- (South Korea) Jung Pyung-yeol (2010–?)
- (South Korea) Kim Han-bong (?–2015)
- (South Korea) Lee Tae-yeop (2016)

== Honours ==
=== Season-by-season records ===
Season	Teams	Tier	Placement	Pld	W	D	L	GF	GA	GD	Pts	League Cup	FA Cup	Manager
2010	18	K3 League	9th in Group B	16	0	0	16	8	44	–36	0	—	—	
2011	16	K3 Challengers League	7th in Group A	22	4	3	15	26	51	–25	15	—	—	
2012	18	K3 Challengers League	4th in Group A	25	9	5	11	45	38	+7	32	—	—	Kim Han-bong
2013	18	K3 Challengers League	4th in Group A	16	5	4	7	31	26	+5	19	—	—	Kim Han-bong
2014	18	K3 Challengers League	6th in Group A	25	8	5	12	31	37	-6	29	—	—	Kim Han-bong
2015	18	K3 League	7th in Group B	25	6	4	15	37	42	–5	22	—	—	Kim Han-bong
2016	20	K3 League	18th	19	2	2	15	16	53	–37	8	—	—	Lee Tae-yeop
