= Goyang Citizen FC =

2008–2022 South Korean football club

- Full name: Goyang Citizen Football Club 고양 시민 축구단
- Short name: GFC
- Founded: 18 March 2008; 18 years ago
- Dissolved: 2022
- Ground: Eoulimnuri Byeolmuri Ground
- Capacity: 2,500
- Coach: Park Jae-hyun
- League: K4 League
- 2020: K4 League, 11th
Home colours	Away colours

Goyang Citizen Football Club (Korean: 고양 시민 축구단) was a South Korean football club based in the city of Goyang. It was founded because of the disappointment created by Goyang KB Kookmin Bank FC, which decided not to elevate to K-League after winning the Korea National League in 2006. It was a member of the K4 League, a semi-professional league and the fourth tier of league football in South Korea. In 2008, it began participating in the Korean football league setup. The club was disbanded in 2022 after it lost its K4 League license.

== Former players ==
- (South Korea) Kim Dae-kwang
- (South Korea) Lee Kwang-Jae

== Season-by-season records ==
Season	Teams	Tier	Placement	Pld	W	D	L	GF	GA	GD	Pts	League Cup	FA Cup	Manager
2008	15	K3 League	15th	29	2	5	23	42	119	–77	10	—	DNQ	
2009	17	K3 League	15th	32	5	1	26	29	125	–96	16	—	First round	
2010	18	K3 League	9th in Group B	25	1	2	22	24	86	–62	5	—	DNQ	
2011	19	K3 Challengers League	8th in Group B	22	3	4	15	24	56	–32	13	—	DNQ	
2012	18	K3 Challengers League	9th in Group B	25	5	7	13	44	60	–16	21	—	DNQ	Kim Jin-ok
2013	18	K3 Challengers League	9th in Group B	16	3	2	11	32	51	–19	10	—	DNQ	Kim Jin-Ok
2014	18	K3 Challengers League	8th in Group A	25	3	3	19	29	60	–31	12	—	DNQ	Kim Jin-ok
2015	18	K3 League	7th in Group B	26	7	1	17	31	57	–26	22	—	Second round	Kim Jin-ok
2016	2	K3 League	19th	19	1	3	15	20	58	–38	6	—	Second round	Kim Jin-ok
2017	9	K3 Basic	8th	16	2	2	12	16	41	–25	8	—	First round	Kim Jin-ok
2018	11	K3 Basic	9th	20	4	1	15	20	78	–58	13	—	First round	Kim Jin-ok
2019	8	K3 Basic	6th	21	4	2	15	23	58	–35	14	—	First round	Kim Jin-ok

K4 League (semi-pro)
Season	Teams	Tier	Placement	Pld	W	D	L	GF	GA	GD	Pts	League Cup	FA Cup	Manager
2020	13	K4 League	11th	24	5	4	15	33	65	–32	19	None	Second round	Kim Young-ho
2021	16	K4 League	16th	30	5	4	21	30	84	–54	19	None	Second round	Park Jae-hyun

== Current squad ==
As of 3 October 2022

Note: Flags indicate national team as defined under FIFA eligibility rules; some limited exceptions apply. Players may hold more than one non-FIFA nationality.

No.	Pos.	Nation	Player
2	DF	KOR	Kim Hyun-ho
3	DF	KOR	Park In-soo
4	DF	KOR	Kim Dong-su
5	MF	KOR	Kim Young-bae
6	MF	KOR	Choi Sung-min
7	MF	KOR	Kim Chan
10	FW	KOR	Kim Min-seo
12	FW	KOR	Kim Kang-san
13	FW	KOR	Song Dae-kyu
14	MF	KOR	Chu Min-yeol
15	FW	KOR	Kim Tae-won
17	DF	KOR	Moon Ji-seong
18	FW	KOR	Lee Weong-min
19	FW	KOR	Cho Sung-jae
20	DF	KOR	Kim Woo-hyeok

No.	Pos.	Nation	Player
21	GK	KOR	Ji Su-hyeon
24	MF	KOR	Kim Yong-ah
25	MF	KOR	Kim Woo-hyuk
26	FW	KOR	Park Hee-young
28	MF	KOR	Yoo Sung-hyun
31	DF	KOR	An Soo-hyun
32	MF	KOR	Choi Jin-hyuk
33	DF	KOR	Kim Dong-hee
34	MF	KOR	Kim Yong-woo
38	MF	KOR	Kim Dong-hwan
39	GK	KOR	Kim Sung-joon
40	FW	KOR	Park Hyeong-been
41	GK	KOR	Kim Young-ho
42	DF	KOR	Lee Jae-yeong
44	FW	KOR	Kim Geun-yeol
