= Icheon Citizen FC =

Icheon Citizen FC 이천 시민 축구단
- Full name: Icheon Citizen Football Club 이천 시민 축구단
- Short name: Icheon Citizen FC
- Founded: 2009; 17 years ago
- Dissolved: 2020
- Ground: Icheon City Stadium
- Capacity: 20,305
- Chairman: Eom Tae-jun (Icheon Mayor)
- Manager: Lee Hyeon-chang
- 2020: K4 League, 9th
- Website: http://www.icheonsports.or.kr
Home colours	Away colours

Icheon Citizen Football Club (Korean: 이천 시민 축구단) was a South Korean football club based in Icheon City and former member of the K4 League, a semi-professional league and the fourth tier of football in South Korea. The club was founded in 2009 and disbanded in 2020.

== Season-by-season records ==
Season	Teams	Tier	Placement	Pld	W	D	L	GF	GA	GD	Pts	FA Cup
2009	17	K3 League	5th	32	16	10	6	70	35	+35	58	N/A
2010	18	K3 League	1st in Group B	25	16	4	5	85	41	+44	52	First round
2011	16	K3 Challengers League	1st in Group B	22	15	4	3	72	25	+47	49	First round
2012	18	K3 Challengers League	3rd in Group A	25	17	2	6	73	27	+46	53	Second round
2013	18	K3 Challengers League	2nd in Group A	25	16	5	4	59	25	+34	53	Round of 32
2014	18	K3 Challengers League	2nd in Group A	25	17	3	5	70	32	+38	54	First round
2015	18	K3 League	4th in Group A	25	14	4	7	58	23	+35	46	Third round
2016	20	K3 League	6th	19	11	3	5	53	24	+29	36	Second round
2017	12	K3 Advanced	6th	22	9	5	8	43	32	+11	32	Second round
2018	12	K3 Advanced	3rd	22	11	5	6	33	25	+8	38	Second round
2019	12	K3 Advanced	9th	22	7	6	9	27	33	–6	27	Third round
2020	13	K4 League	9th	24	7	6	11	29	40	–11	27	First round

== See also ==
- List of football clubs in South Korea
