= Gyeongju Citizen FC =

2008–2020 South Korean football club

- Full name: Gyeongju Citizen Football Club 경주 시민 축구단
- Founded: 2008; 18 years ago
- Dissolved: 2020; 6 years ago
- Ground: Gyeongju Civic Stadium
- Capacity: 12,199
- Manager: Kim Dae-geon
- Coach: Son Hyun-jun
- 2020: K3 League, 14th
- Website: http://www.gjfc.kr
Home colours

Gyeongju Citizen Football Club (Korean: 경주 시민 축구단) was a South Korean former football club based in the city of Gyeongju. It is a former member of the K3 League, the third tier of league football in South Korea until the 2020 season before it was dissolved.

== Honours ==
K3 League

Winners (1): 2010
Runners-up (1): 2015

K3 League Challengers League

Winners (1): 2011

K3 League Advanced

Winners (1): 2018

== Season-by-season records ==
Season	Teams	Tier	Placement	Pld	W	D	L	GF	GA	GD	Pts	FA Cup
2008	16	K3 League	11th	29	9	3	17	52	65	–13	30	—
2009	17	K3 League	9th	32	13	9	10	74	32	+42	48	Did not qualify
2010	18	K3 League	Regular season: 2nd in Group A Playoffs: Winners	25	17	4	4	71	26	+45	55	Preliminary round
2011	16	K3 Challengers League	Regular season: 2nd in Group A Playoffs: Winners	22	13	6	3	57	24	+33	45	Did not qualify
2012	18	K3 Challengers League	4th in Group B	25	12	7	6	48	30	+18	43	Round of 32
2013	18	K3 Challengers League	Regular season: 3rd in Group B Playoffs: Semi-finals	25	12	5	8	54	32	+22	41	Preliminary round
2014	18	K3 Challengers League	5th in Group A	25	12	2	11	51	36	+15	38	Preliminary round
2015	18	K3 League	Regular season: 2nd in Group A Playoffs: Runners-up	25	16	3	6	72	27	+45	51	Preliminary round
2016	20	K3 League	10th	19	9	3	7	32	24	+8	30	Round of 16
2017	12	K3 Advance	8th	22	7	5	10	36	36	0	26	Preliminary round
2018	12	K3 Advanced	Regular season: 1st Playoffs: Winners	22	16	2	4	46	21	+25	50	Round of 32
2019	12	K3 Advanced	Regular season: 2nd Playoffs: Semi-finals	22	14	4	4	36	21	+15	46	Preliminary round
2020	16	K3 League	14th	22	3	6	13	13	36	–20	15	Third round

== See also ==
- List of football clubs in South Korea
