= Chuncheon FC =

South Korean football club

Chuncheon Citizen FC
- Full name: Chuncheon Citizen Football Club 춘천 시민 축구단
- Founded: 12 December 2009; 16 years ago
- Ground: Chuncheon Stadium
- Capacity: 25,000
- Owner: Lee Gwang-chun (Mayor)
- Chairman: Yook Dong-han
- Manager: Jeong Seon-woo
- Coach: Jeong Ha-young
- League: K3 League
- 2023: K3 League, 8th of 15
- Website: https://blog.naver.com/chuncheonmedia
Home colours	Away colours

Chuncheon Citizen Football Club (Korean: 춘천 시민 축구단) is a South Korean football club based in Chuncheon, Gangwon. The club plays in the K3 League, the third tier of league football in South Korea. Chuncheon FC's home ground is Chuncheon Songam Sports Town.

== History ==
Chuncheon Citizen FC was founded on 12 December 2009 and began competing in the K3 League in 2010. Chuncheon FC were relegated to the K4 League in 2020, following poor performance and internal issues. They returned to the K3 League after two years in the K4 League, finishing in third place in the league and gaining promotion by winning the promotion/relegation play-off against Dangjin Citizen FC.

== Current squad ==
As of 21 July 2022

Note: Flags indicate national team as defined under FIFA eligibility rules; some limited exceptions apply. Players may hold more than one non-FIFA nationality.

No.	Pos.	Nation	Player
1	GK	KOR	Kim Chol-ho
3	DF	KOR	Lee Jae-hyeon
4	DF	KOR	Park Cheon-ho
5	DF	KOR	Kim Hyeon-beom
6	DF	KOR	Kim Ho-yeong
7	MF	KOR	Kim Dong-uk
8	MF	KOR	Lee Sang-oh
9	MF	KOR	Shin Sang-hwi
10	MF	KOR	Yoon Dong-kwon
12	MF	KOR	Kim Do-hyung
13	FW	KOR	Cho Hyun-jin
14	MF	KOR	Heo Chang-soo
15	DF	KOR	Oh Sung-hoon
16	DF	KOR	Jang Tae-in
17	MF	KOR	Park Sang-hyun
18	FW	KOR	Jung Jin-yeop
19	FW	KOR	Han Kyung-jin
20	MF	KOR	Jeon In-kyu

No.	Pos.	Nation	Player
21	FW	KOR	Jung Gi-san
22	DF	KOR	Hwang Eun-suk
23	FW	KOR	Park Jae-min
24	MF	KOR	Jung Min-woo
25	GK	KOR	Yoon Se-jun
28	MF	KOR	An Seong-ju
30	DF	KOR	Song Joo-han
31	GK	KOR	Lee Dae-ho
32	MF	KOR	An Sang-soo
33	DF	KOR	Choi Yong-hoon
39	FW	KOR	Jung Chang-yong
47	MF	KOR	Jeong Hyeon-woo
66	MF	KOR	Lee Ji-won
77	FW	KOR	Kim Min-su
88	MF	KOR	Kang Dong-hyeok
98	MF	KOR	Park Dong-hyeon
99	MF	KOR	Jung Se-bin

== Honours ==
- K3 League

Runners-up (1): 2012

== Season-by-season records ==
Season	Teams	Tier	Placement	Pld	W	D	L	GF	GA	GD	Pts	FA Cup	Manager
2010	16	K3 League	8th in Group B	25	6	2	17	36	68	–32	20	—	Ham Cheol-kwon
2011	16	K3 Challengers League	3rd in Group B	22	13	4	5	38	23	+15	43	—	Ham Cheol-kwon
2012	18	K3 Challengers League	Runners-up	25	18	4	3	62	25	+37	58	First round	Kim Yong-ho
2013	18	K3 Challengers League	3rd in Group A	16	12	1	3	38	15	+23	37	First round	Kim Yong-ho
2014	18	K3 Challengers League	Playoffs	25	11	9	5	49	29	+20	42	Second round	Jung Sun-woo
2015	18	K3 League	5th in Group B	25	11	4	10	46	42	+4	36.5	Second round	Jung Sun-woo
2016	20	K3 League	8th	19	10	2	7	23	18	+5	32	Second round	Jung Sun-woo
2017	12	K3 Advanced	10th	22	7	3	12	23	29	–6	24	Round of 32	Jung Sun-woo
2018	12	K3 Advanced	5th	22	10	6	6	38	27	+11	36	Round of 16	Son Hyun-jun
2019	12	K3 Advanced	10th	22	4	3	15	23	38	–15	15	Third round	Son Hyun-jun
K3–K4 League (Semi-professional)
2020	16	K3 League	15↓	22	2	8	12	21	43	-22	14	Second Round	Kim Kyung-bun
2021	16	K4 League	10th	30	10	6	14	40	51	-11	36	Second Round	Kim Kyung-bun
2022	17	K4 League	3rd↑	32	18	7	7	55	31	+24	61	Second Round	Jeong Seon-woo
2023	16	K3 League	TBC	30						-		TBD	Jeong Seon-woo
