= Seoul FC Martyrs =

Former association football club in the South Korea

Seoul FC Martyrs 서울 FC 마르티스
- Full name: Seoul Football Club Martyrs 서울 마르티스 축구단
- Founded: 2009; 17 years ago
- Dissolved: 2015; 11 years ago
- Ground: Gangbuk-gu Public Stadium
- Capacity: 2,000
Home colours	Away colours

Seoul Martyrs Football Club (Korean: 서울 마르티스 축구단) was a semi-professional South Korean football club based in Gangbuk District, Seoul. The club was founded in 2002 and was dissolved in 2016. Thy last played in the initial iteration of the K3 League, the fourth tier of football in South Korea.

== Season-by-season results ==
Season	League								
Season	Div.	Pos.	P	W	D	L	GF	GA	P
2009	4th	17	32	2	0	30	18	194	6
2010	4th	8 (Note: Group A)	25	2	2	21	31	88	8
2011	4th	5 (Note: Group B)	22	9	3	10	43	56	30
2012	4th	9	25	0	2	23	28	155	2
2013	4th	8	25	4	2	19	24	92	14
2014	4th	9	25	2	0	23	24	163	6
2015	4th	9	25	0	0	25	9	284	–3 (Note: Seoul FC Martyrs have been deducted three points.)

== See also ==
- Football in Seoul
