= 2011 Incheon United FC season =

Incheon United
2011 season
- Chairman: Song Young-Gil
- Manager: Huh Jung-Moo
- K-League: 13th
- Korean FA Cup: Round of 16
- League Cup: Group round
- Top goalscorer: League: Park Jun-Tae (5); All: Park Jun-Tae (5); Timur Kapadze (5)
- Highest home attendance: 27,831 vs Jeju (March 12)
- Lowest home attendance: 428 vs Yonsei Univ. (May 18)
- Average home league attendance: 6,394
Home colours	Away colours

The 2011 season was Incheon United's eighth season in the K-League in South Korea. Incheon United was competing in K-League, League Cup and Korean FA Cup.

== Current squad ==
Note: Flags indicate national team as defined under FIFA eligibility rules; some limited exceptions apply. Players may hold more than one non-FIFA nationality.

No.	Pos.	Nation	Player
2	DF	KOR	Kim Han-Seob
3	MF	KOR	Jang Won-Seok
4	DF	KOR	Kim Sun-Woo
5	MF	BRA	Fábio Bahia
6	DF	KOR	Bae Hyo-Sung (captain)
7	MF	KOR	Lee Jae-Kwon
8	MF	KOR	Jeong Hyuk
9	FW	KOR	Kim Myung-Woon
10	FW	BRA	Almir
11	FW	BRA	Elionar (on loan from ABC FC)
13	MF	KOR	Lee Jong-hyun
14	MF	KOR	Ahn Jae-Gon
15	FW	KOR	Kim Jae-Woong
16	DF	KOR	Lee Yoon-Pyo
17	DF	KOR	Jeon Jae-Ho
18	MF	UZB	Timur Kapadze
19	MF	KOR	Kim Seung-Ho
20	DF	KOR	Jung In-Hwan
21	FW	KOR	Yoo Jun-Soo
22	MF	KOR	Shin Dong-Hyuk
23	FW	KOR	Kwon Hyuk-Jin
25	GK	KOR	Song Yoo-Geol
26	DF	KOR	Joo Hyun-Jae

No.	Pos.	Nation	Player
27	FW	KOR	Han Kyo-Won
28	DF	KOR	Jeon Jun-Hyung
29	MF	KOR	Jo Bum-Seok
30	GK	KOR	Yoon Jin-Ho
31	GK	KOR	Baek Sun-Kyu
32	DF	KOR	Jang Kyung-Jin
33	DF	KOR	Park Tae-Soo
34	DF	KOR	Ahn Tae-Eun
35	FW	KOR	Jeong Sun-Bi
36	MF	KOR	Lee Ho-Chang
37	MF	KOR	Park Kyung-Soon
40	MF	KOR	Park Ho-Yong
41	DF	KOR	Cho Kwang-Hoon
42	MF	KOR	Joo Ki-Ho
43	DF	KOR	Kim Tae-Eun
45	MF	KOR	Ji Kyung-Deuk
46	DF	KOR	Lee Won-Yong
48	DF	KOR	Im Joong-Yong
49	FW	KOR	Kim Hyun-Min
50	FW	KOR	Seo Young-Won
51	FW	KOR	Park Jun-Tae
77	GK	KOR	Kwon Jung-Hyuk

== Match results ==
=== K-League ===
Date Round	Home	Score	Away	Location

5 March 1	Sangju Sangmu Phoenix	2–0	Incheon United	Sangju, Gyeongbuk
15:00 UTC+9	Kim Jung-Woo 5' (pen.), 50'	Report		Stadium: Sangju Stadium; Attendance: 16,400; Referee: Ahn Yong-Hee

12 March 2	Incheon United	0–0	Jeju United	Nam-gu, Incheon
15:00 UTC+9		Report		Stadium: Incheon Munhak Stadium; Attendance: 27,831; Referee: Yoo Seon-Ho

20 March 3	Incheon United	1–1	Daegu	Seo-gu, Incheon
15:00 UTC+9	Giaretta 45'	Report	Lee Ji-Nam 29'	Stadium: Incheon Munhak Stadium; Attendance: 5,326; Referee: Lee Dong-Jun

3 April 4	Gyeongnam	2–1	Incheon United	Changwon, Gyeongnam
15:00 UTC+9	Yoon Il-Rok 1'; Lucio 62'	Report	Yoo Byung-Soo 22'	Stadium: Changwon Football Center; Attendance: 8,672; Referee: Ko Keum-Bok

9 April 5	Pohang Steelers	2–2	Incheon United	Pohang, Gyeongbuk
15:00 UTC+9	Hwang Jin-Sung 4', 48'	Report	Kapadze 34'; Yoo Byung-Soo 83'	Stadium: Pohang Steel Yard; Attendance: 16,762; Referee: Lee Sang-Yong

17 April 6	Incheon United	2–1	Seongnam Ilhwa Chunma	Seo-gu, Incheon
15:00 UTC+9	Kim Jae-Woong 1'; Park Jun-Tae 90+1'	Report	Hong Jin-Sub 78'	Stadium: Incheon Munhak Stadium; Attendance: 8,278; Referee: Choi Myung-Yong

23 April 7	Gangwon	1–3	Incheon United	Chuncheon, Gangwon
15:00 UTC+9	Kim Young-Hoo 42'	Report	Kim Jae-Woong 60'; Yoo Byung-Soo 62'; Park Jun-Tae 76'	Stadium: Chuncheon Stadium; Attendance: 3,511; Referee: Lee Min-Hu

30 April 8	Incheon United	2–6	Jeonbuk Hyundai Motors	Seo-gu, Incheon
19:00 UTC+9	Han Kyo-Won 1'; Bae Hyo-Sung 81'	Report	Lim You-Hwan 10'; Lee Dong-Gook 13', 69'; Eninho 56'; Jeong Shung-Hoon 77'; Kim Dong-Chan 90'	Stadium: Incheon Munhak Stadium; Attendance: 1,127; Referee: Ryu Hee-Seon

8 May 9	Daejeon Citizen	1–2	Incheon United	Yuseong-gu, Daejeon
15:00 UTC+9	Wagner 64'	Report	Park Jun-Tae 74'; Kim Jae-Woong 82'	Stadium: Daejeon World Cup Stadium; Attendance: 13,178; Referee: Lee Jong-Guk

15 May 10	Incheon United	0–0	Busan I'Park	Seo-gu, Incheon
15:00 UTC+9		Report		Stadium: Incheon Munhak Stadium; Attendance: 6,208; Referee: Lee Dong-Jun

22 May 11	Gwangju	0–1	Incheon United	Seo-gu, Gwangju
15:00 UTC+9		Report	Han Kyo-Won 73'	Stadium: Gwangju World Cup Stadium; Attendance: 7,210; Referee: Ko Keum-Bok

29 May 12	Incheon United	2–1	Suwon Samsung Bluewings	Seo-gu, Incheon
15:00 UTC+9	Jang Won-Seok 2'; Kapadze 32' (pen.)	Report	Yeom Ki-Hun 15'	Stadium: Incheon Munhak Stadium; Attendance: 10,582; Referee: Kim Sung-Ho

11 June 13	Incheon United	1–1	Chunnam Dragons	Seo-gu, Incheon
19:00 UTC+9	Jang Won-Seok 88'	Report	Ji Dong-Won 28'	Stadium: Incheon Munhak Stadium; Attendance: 7,498; Referee: Kim Dong-Jin

18 June 14	Ulsan Hyundai	1–1	Incheon United	Nam-gu, Ulsan
19:00 UTC+9	Ko Chang-Hyun 44'	Report	Luizinho 32'	Stadium: Munsu Cup Stadium; Attendance: 23,897; Referee: Woo Sang-Il

25 June 15	FC Seoul	1–1	Incheon United	Mapo-gu, Seoul
20:00 UTC+9	Yeo Hyo-Jin (yellow card) 15' (yellow-red card) 73'; Damjanović 40'	Report	Han Kyo-Won 37'; Jang Won-Seok (yellow card) 71' (yellow-red card) 75'	Stadium: Seoul World Cup Stadium; Attendance: 15,315; Referee: Choi Kwang-Bo

2 July 16	Incheon United	2–2	Gwangju	Seo-gu, Incheon
19:00 UTC+9	Park Jun-Tae 46'; Jeon Jae-Ho 72'	Report	Kim Dong-Sub 41'; João Paulo 83'	Stadium: Incheon Munhak Stadium; Attendance: 6,387; Referee: Lee Jong-Guk

10 July 17	Seongnam Ilhwa Chunma	2–2	Incheon United	Seongnam, Gyeonggi
17:00 UTC+9	Bae Hyo-Sung 56' (o.g.); Song Ho-Young 86'	Report	Ognenovski 46' (o.g.); Kapadze 82'	Stadium: Tancheon Sports Complex; Attendance: 3,147; Referee: Moon Jin-Hee

16 July 18	Suwon Samsung Bluewings	1–0	Incheon United	Suwon, Gyeonggi
19:30 UTC+9	Ristić 34'	Report		Stadium: Suwon World Cup Stadium; Attendance: 17,088; Referee: Choi Myung-Yong

23 July 19	Incheon United	2–2	Gyeongnam	Seo-gu, Incheon
19:00 UTC+9	Fábio Bahia 72'; Park Jun-Tae 75'	Report	Lee Hyo-Kyun 51'; Jung Dae-Sun 55'	Stadium: Incheon Munhak Stadium; Attendance: 6,768; Referee: Choi Kwang-Bo

7 August 20	Chunnam Dragons	0–0	Incheon United	Gwangyang, Jeonnam
19:00 UTC+9		Report	Jeong Hyuk (red card) 33'	Stadium: Gwangyang Stadium; Attendance: 1,368; Referee: Hong Jin-Ho

13 August 21	Busan I'Park	1–0	Incheon United	Yeonje-gu, Busan
19:00 UTC+9	Fagner 25' (pen.) (yellow card) 21' (yellow-red card) 81'	Report		Stadium: Busan Asiad Stadium; Attendance: 5,613; Referee: Choi Myung-Yong

20 August 22	Incheon United	0–0	Gangwon	Seo-gu, Incheon
19:00 UTC+9		Report		Stadium: Incheon Munhak Stadium; Attendance: 5,786; Referee: Lee Sam-Ho

27 August 23	Incheon United	2–0	Daejeon Citizen	Seo-gu, Incheon
19:00 UTC+9	Jeong Hyuk 7'; Fábio Bahia 82'	Report	Noh Yong-Hun (yellow card) 19' (yellow-red card) 30'	Stadium: Incheon Munhak Stadium; Attendance: 4,619; Referee: Lee Jong-Guk

9 September 24	Jeonbuk Hyundai Motors	4–2	Incheon United	Jeonju, Jeonbuk
19:00 UTC+9	Eninho 25'; Kim Dong-Chan 56'; Jeong Shung-Hoon 78', 88'	Report	Jung In-Hwan 9'; Elionar 51'	Stadium: Jeonju World Cup Stadium; Attendance: 8,334; Referee: Moon Jin-Hee

17 September 25	Incheon United	0–1	Pohang Steelers	Seo-gu, Incheon
19:00 UTC+9		Report	Mota 6' (pen.)	Stadium: Incheon Munhak Stadium; Attendance: 6,728; Referee: Choi Myung-Yong

24 September 26	Incheon United	0–2	Ulsan Hyundai	Seo-gu, Incheon
19:00 UTC+9		Report	Seol Ki-Hyeon 69'; Park Seung-Il 81'	Stadium: Incheon Munhak Stadium; Attendance: 5,141; Referee: Ko Keum-Bok

2 October 27	Daegu	2–0	Incheon United	Buk-gu, Daegu
15:00 UTC+9	Song Je-Heon 46', 60'	Report		Stadium: Daegu Civil Stadium; Attendance: 3,215; Referee: Kim Sung-Ho

16 October 28	Incheon United	1–1	FC Seoul	Seo-gu, Incheon
15:00 UTC+9	Jung In-Hwan 62'	Report	Molina 73'	Stadium: Incheon Munhak Stadium; Attendance: 6,822; Referee: Yoo Sun-Ho

22 October 29	Jeju United	2–1	Incheon United	Seogwipo, Jeju
15:00 UTC+9	Kang Su-Il 37'; Santos 67' (pen.)	Report	Kapadze 33'	Stadium: Jeju World Cup Stadium; Attendance: 4,879; Referee: Lee Sam-Ho

30 October 30	Incheon United	0–0	Sangju Sangmu Phoenix	Seo-gu, Incheon
15:00 UTC+9		Report		Stadium: Incheon Munhak Stadium; Attendance: 4,331; Referee: Woo Sang-Il

==== League table ====
Pos	Team	Pld	W	D	L	GF	GA	GD	Pts
11	Gwangju FC	30	9	8	13	32	43	−11	35
12	Daegu FC	30	8	9	13	35	46	−11	33
13	Incheon United	30	6	14	10	31	40	−9	32
14	Sangju Sangmu Phoenix	30	7	8	15	36	53	−17	29
15	Daejeon Citizen	30	6	9	15	31	59	−28	27

Source: K League
Rules for classification: 1) Points; 2) Goal difference; 3) Goals scored

Pos	Team	Qualification
1	Jeonbuk Hyundai Motors (C)	Qualification for the Champions League group stage
2	Ulsan Hyundai	Qualification for the Champions League group stage
3	Pohang Steelers	Qualification for the Champions League playoff round
4	Suwon Samsung Bluewings	
5	FC Seoul	
6	Busan IPark	

Source: RSSSF
(C) Champions

==== Results summary ====
Overall								Home						Away					
Pld	W	D	L	GF	GA	GD	Pts	W	D	L	GF	GA	GD	W	D	L	GF	GA	GD
30	6	14	10	31	40	−9	32	3	9	3	15	18	−3	3	5	7	16	22	−6

==== Results by round ====
Round	1	2	3	4	5	6	7	8	9	10	11	12	13	14	15	16	17	18	19	20	21	22	23	24	25	26	27	28	29	30
Ground	A	H	H	A	A	H	A	H	A	H	A	H	H	A	A	H	A	A	H	A	A	H	H	A	H	H	A	H	A	H
Result	L	D	D	L	D	W	W	L	W	D	W	W	D	D	D	D	D	L	D	D	L	D	W	L	L	L	L	D	L	D
Position	15	14	12	14	14	11	10	14	11	10	7	6	6	6	5	7	7	10	10	10	10	10	9	10	10	10	12	13	13	13

Updated to match(es) played on 30 October 2011. Source: League Fixtures and Results
A = Away; H = Home; W = Win; D = Draw; L = Loss

=== Korean FA Cup ===
18 May Round of 32	Incheon United	2–1	Yonsei University	Nam-gu, Incheon
19:00 UTC+9	Yoo Joon-Soo 5'; Lee Yun-Pyo 64'		Jang Hyun-Soo 74'	Stadium: Incheon Munhak Stadium; Attendance: 428

15 June Round of 16	Incheon United	0–2	Seongnam Ilhwa Chunma	Nam-gu, Incheon
19:00 UTC+9			Cho Dong-Geon 47'; Éverton Santos 67'	Stadium: Incheon Munhak Stadium; Attendance: 1,027; Referee: Kim Jong-Hyuk

=== League Cup ===
16 March Group round	Incheon United	3–0	Daejeon Citizen	Seo-gu, Incheon
19:00 UTC+9	Kim Myung-Woon 38'; Yoo Byung-Soo 50'; Kapadze 71'	Report		Stadium: Incheon Munhak Stadium; Attendance: 4,256; Referee: Ryu Hee-Seon

6 April Group round	Incheon United	0–0	Daegu	Seo-gu, Incheon
19:00 UTC+9		Report		Stadium: Incheon Munhak Stadium; Attendance: 2,351; Referee: Ko Hyung-Jin

20 April Group round	Gyeongnam	1–0	Incheon United	Changwon, Gyeongnam
20:00 UTC+9	Kim In-Han 81'	Report		Stadium: Changwon Football Center; Attendance: 1,321; Referee: Kim Sang-Woo

5 May Group round	Pohang Steelers	4–1	Incheon United	Pohang, Gyeongbuk
14:00 UTC+9	Ko Mu-Yeol 8'; Cho Chan-Ho 10', 27'; Kim Gi-Dong 34'	Report	Luizinho 86' (pen.)	Stadium: Steelyard Stadium; Attendance: 16,671; Referee: Yoo Seon-Ho

11 May Group round	Seongnam Ilhwa Chunma	1–1	Incheon United	Seongnam, Gyeonggi
20:00 UTC+9	Hong Jin-Sub 23'	Report	Kim Jae-Woong 16'; Lee Yoon-Pyo (yellow card) 78' (yellow-red card) 89'	Stadium: Tancheon Sports Complex; Attendance: 1,024; Referee: Hong Jin-Ho

== Squad statistics ==
=== Appearances and goals ===
Statistics accurate as of match played 30 October 2011
Numbers in parentheses denote appearances as substitute.

No.	Nat.	Pos.	Name	League		FA Cup		League Cup		Total	
No.	Nat.	Pos.	Name	Apps	Goals	Apps	Goals	Apps	Goals	Apps	Goals
2	KOR	DF	Kim Han-Seob	8	0	0	0	0	0	8 (0)	0
3	KOR	MF	Jang Won-Seok	21 (1)	2	2	0	2	0	25 (1)	2
4	KOR	DF	Kim Sun-Woo	0	0	0	0	0	0	0	0
5	BRA	MF	Fábio Bahia	25 (4)	2	2	0	2	0	29 (4)	2
6	KOR	DF	Bae Hyo-Sung	28 (1)	1	1 (1)	0	2	0	31 (2)	1
7	KOR	MF	Lee Jae-Kwon	24 (3)	0	2	0	2	0	28 (3)	0
8	KOR	MF	Jeong Hyuk	11 (4)	1	0	0	0	0	11 (4)	1
9	KOR	FW	Kim Myung-Woon	6 (3)	0	1	0	3	1	10 (3)	1
10	BRA	FW	Almir	3 (2)	0	0	0	0	0	3 (2)	0
11	BRA	FW	Elionar	6	1	0	0	0	0	6 (0)	1
13	KOR	MF	Lee Jong-hyun	0 (2)	0	0	0	1 (2)	0	1 (4)	0
14	KOR	MF	Ahn Jae-Gon	3 (1)	0	0	0	0	0	3 (1)	0
15	KOR	FW	Kim Jae-Woong	10 (5)	3	1 (1)	0	2	1	13 (6)	4
16	KOR	DF	Lee Yoon-Pyo	21 (1)	0	2	1	2	0	25 (1)	1
17	KOR	DF	Jeon Jae-Ho	19 (1)	1	1	0	1	0	21 (1)	1
18	UZB	MF	Timur Kapadze	25 (3)	4	1 (1)	0	0 (2)	1	26 (6)	5
19	KOR	MF	Kim Seung-Ho	0	0	0	0	0	0	0	0
20	KOR	DF	Jung In-Hwan	22	2	2	0	2	0	26 (0)	2
21	KOR	FW	Yoo Jun-Soo	7 (6)	0	2	1	4	0	13 (6)	1
22	KOR	MF	Shin Dong-Hyuk	0 (1)	0	0	0	0 (3)	0	0 (4)	0
23	KOR	FW	Kwon Hyuk-Jin	0 (1)	0	0	0	0 (1)	0	0 (2)	0
25	KOR	GK	Song Yoo-Geol	11	0	2	0	2	0	15 (0)	0
26	KOR	DF	Joo Hyun-Jae	0	0	0	0	0	0	0	0
27	KOR	FW	Han Kyo-Won	17 (10)	3	1 (1)	0	2	0	20 (11)	3
28	KOR	DF	Jeon Jun-Hyung	6 (2)	0	0	0	1	0	7 (2)	0
29	KOR	MF	Jo Bum-Seok	2 (1)	0	0	0	3	0	5 (1)	0
30	KOR	GK	Yoon Jin-Ho	0	0	0	0	0	0	0	0
31	KOR	GK	Baek Sun-Kyu	0	0	0	0	1	0	1 (0)	0
32	KOR	DF	Jang Kyung-Jin	9 (2)	0	1	0	2	0	12 (2)	0
33	KOR	DF	Park Tae-Soo	0 (1)	0	0	0	3 (2)	0	3 (3)	0
34	KOR	DF	Ahn Tae-Eun	5 (2)	0	0	0	2	0	7 (2)	0
35	KOR	FW	Jeong Sun-Bi	0	0	0	0	0	0	0	0
36	KOR	MF	Lee Ho-Chang	0	0	0	0	1 (1)	0	1 (1)	0
37	KOR	MF	Park Kyung-Soon	0	0	0	0	0	0	0	0
40	KOR	MF	Park Ho-Yong	0	0	0	0	3	0	3 (0)	0
41	KOR	DF	Cho Kwang-Hoon	0	0	0	0	0	0	0	0
42	KOR	MF	Joo Ki-Ho	0	0	0	0	0	0	0	0
43	KOR	DF	Kim Tae-Eun	0	0	0	0	0 (1)	0	0 (1)	0
45	KOR	MF	Ji Kyung-Deuk	1 (1)	0	0	0	2	0	3 (1)	0
46	KOR	DF	Lee Won-Yong	0	0	0	0	0	0	0	0
48	KOR	DF	Im Joong-Yong	0 (1)	0	0	0	0	0	0 (1)	0
49	KOR	FW	Kim Hyun-Min	0	0	0	0	0	0	0	0
50	KOR	FW	Seo Young-Won	0	0	0	0	0	0	0	0
51	KOR	FW	Park Jun-Tae	1 (22)	5	0 (1)	0	0 (3)	0	1 (26)	5
77	KOR	GK	Kwon Jung-Hyuk	14	0	0	0	0	0	14 (0)	0
1	KOR	GK	Yoon Ki-Won (out)	5	0	0	0	2	0	7 (0)	0
2	KOR	DF	Kim Young-Bin (out)	0 (1)	0	0	0	1	0	1 (1)	0
4	BRA	DF	Diego Giaretta (out)	5 (1)	1	0	0	3	0	8 (1)	1
10	KOR	FW	Yoo Byung-Soo (out)	9 (3)	3	0	0	1	1	10 (3)	4
11	BRA	FW	Luizinho (out)	6 (1)	1	0 (1)	0	3	1	9 (2)	2
24	KOR	DF	Lee Sung-Yong (out)	0	0	0	0	0	0	0	0
38	KOR	DF	Lee Se-Joo (out)	0	0	1	0	0	0	1 (0)	0
39	KOR	MF	Kim Ba-Wi (out)	0	0	0	0	0	0	0	0
44	KOR	FW	Jeon Bo-Hoon (out)	0	0	0	0	0	0	0	0
47	KOR	FW	Choi Soo-Bin (out)	0	0	0	0	0	0	0	0

=== Top scorers ===
Rank	Nation	Number	Name	K-League	KFA Cup	League Cup	Total
1	(South Korea)	51	Park Jun-Tae	5	0	0	5
=	(Uzbekistan)	18	Timur Kapadze	4	0	1	5
2	(South Korea)	10	Yoo Byung-Soo	3	0	1	4
=	(South Korea)	15	Kim Jae-Woong	3	0	1	4
3	(South Korea)	27	Han Kyo-Won	3	0	0	3
4	(South Korea)	3	Jang Won-Seok	2	0	0	2
=	(Brazil)	5	Fábio Bahia	2	0	0	2
=	(South Korea)	20	Jung In-Hwan	2	0	0	2
=	(Brazil)	11	Luizinho	1	0	1	2
5	(Brazil)	4	Diego Giaretta	1	0	0	1
=	(South Korea)	6	Bae Hyo-Sung	1	0	0	1
=	(South Korea)	8	Jeong Hyuk	1	0	0	1
=	(Brazil)	11	Elionar	1	0	0	1
=	(South Korea)	17	Jeon Jae-Ho	1	0	0	1
=	(South Korea)	16	Lee Yoon-Pyo	0	1	0	1
=	(South Korea)	21	Yoo Jun-Soo	0	1	0	1
=	(South Korea)	9	Kim Myung-Woon	0	0	1	1
/	/	/	Own Goals	1	0	0	1
/	/	/	TOTALS	31	2	5	38

=== Top assistors ===
Rank	Nation	Number	Name	K-League	KFA Cup	League Cup	Total
1	(South Korea)	7	Lee Jae-Kwon	3	1	1	5
2	(South Korea)	3	Jang Won-Seok	3	1	0	4
3	(Uzbekistan)	18	Timur Kapadze	3	0	0	3
4	(South Korea)	8	Jeong Hyuk	2	0	0	2
=	(South Korea)	27	Han Kyo-Won	2	0	0	2
=	(South Korea)	10	Yoo Byung-Soo	1	0	1	2
5	(Brazil)	5	Fábio Bahia	1	0	0	1
=	(South Korea)	9	Kim Myung-Woon	1	0	0	1
=	(Brazil)	11	Luizinho	1	0	0	1
=	(South Korea)	15	Kim Jae-Woong	1	0	0	1
=	(South Korea)	16	Lee Yoon-Pyo	1	0	0	1
=	(South Korea)	17	Jeon Jae-Ho	1	0	0	1
=	(South Korea)	21	Yoo Jun-Soo	1	0	0	1
=	(South Korea)	34	Ahn Tae-Eun	1	0	0	1
=	(South Korea)	51	Park Jun-Tae	1	0	0	1
=	(South Korea)	20	Jung In-Hwan	0	0	1	1
/	/	/	TOTALS	23	2	3	28

=== Discipline ===
Position	Nation	Number	Name	K-League		KFA Cup		League Cup		Total	
Position	Nation	Number	Name	Booked	Sent off (straight red)	Booked	Sent off (straight red)	Booked	Sent off (straight red)	Booked	Sent off (straight red)
DF	(South Korea)	2	Kim Han-Seob	2	0	0	0	0	0	2	0
MF	(South Korea)	3	Jang Won-Seok	6	1	1	0	1	0	8	1
DF	(Brazil)	4	Diego Giaretta	1	0	0	0	0	0	1	0
MF	(Brazil)	5	Fábio Bahia	1	0	0	0	0	0	1	0
DF	(South Korea)	6	Bae Hyo-Sung	3	0	0	0	0	0	3	0
MF	(South Korea)	7	Lee Jae-Kwon	6	0	0	0	1	0	7	0
MF	(South Korea)	8	Jeong Hyuk	2	1	0	0	0	0	2	1
FW	(South Korea)	10	Yoo Byung-Soo	2	0	0	0	1	0	3	0
FW	(Brazil)	11	Luizinho	2	0	0	0	2	0	4	0
FW	(South Korea)	15	Kim Jae-Woong	5	0	0	0	1	0	6	0
DF	(South Korea)	16	Lee Yoon-Pyo	5	0	0	0	2	1	7	1
DF	(South Korea)	17	Jeon Jae-Ho	4	0	0	0	0	0	4	0
MF	(Uzbekistan)	18	Timur Kapadze	3	0	0	0	0	0	3	0
DF	(South Korea)	20	Jung In-Hwan	3	0	0	0	0	0	3	0
FW	(South Korea)	21	Yoo Jun-Soo	3	0	0	0	1	0	4	0
GK	(South Korea)	25	Song Yoo-Geol	1	0	0	0	0	0	1	0
FW	(South Korea)	27	Han Kyo-Won	1	0	0	0	0	0	1	0
DF	(South Korea)	32	Jang Kyung-Jin	3	0	0	0	2	0	5	0
DF	(South Korea)	33	Park Tae-Soo	0	0	0	0	2	0	2	0
MF	(South Korea)	36	Lee Ho-Chang	0	0	0	0	1	0	1	0
MF	(South Korea)	40	Park Ho-Yong	0	0	0	0	2	0	2	0
MF	(South Korea)	45	Ji Kyung-Deuk	0	0	0	0	1	0	1	0
FW	(South Korea)	51	Park Jun-Tae	2	0	0	0	0	0	2	0
/	/	/	TOTALS	55	2	1	0	17	1	73	3

== Transfer ==
=== In ===
- 8 July 2011 – (South Korea) Kwon Jung-Hyuk – Free Agent
- 28 July 2011 – (South Korea) Kim Han-Seob – Daejeon Citizen
- 3 August 2011 – (Brazil) Elionar – ABC Futebol Clube (loan)
- 16 September 2011 – (Brazil) Almir – Free Agent

=== Out ===
- 6 May 2011 – (South Korea) Yoon Ki-Won – Dead
- 6 July 2011 – (Brazil) Diego Giaretta – free agent
- 24 July 2011 – (South Korea) Yoo Byung-Soo – Al-Hilal FC
- 28 July 2011 – (South Korea) Kim Han-Seob – Daejeon Citizen
- 28 July 2011 – (South Korea) Jeon Bo-Hoon – Daejeon Citizen
- 28 July 2011 – (Brazil) Luizinho – Free Agent
- 3 August 2011 – (South Korea) Lee Sung-Yong – Free Agent
- 3 August 2011 – (South Korea) Kim Ba-Wi – Thai Port FC
- 3 August 2011 – (South Korea) Choi Soo-Bin – Saraburi FC
