= 2007 Pohang Steelers season =

Pohang Steelers
2007 season
- Chairman: Kim Hyun-Sik
- Manager: Sérgio Farias
- K-League: Winner
- Korean FA Cup: Runner-up
- League Cup: Group Stage
- Top goalscorer: League: Lee Gwang-Jae (7 goals); All: Lee Gwang-Jae (9 goals)
- Highest home attendance: 20,875 vs Seongnam (4 November)
- Lowest home attendance: 1,074 vs Jeonbuk (9 May)
- Average home league attendance: 5,949
Home colours	Away colours

The 2007 season is Pohang Steelers' 25th season in the K-League in South Korea. Pohang Steelers competed in K-League, League Cup and Korean FA Cup.

== Squad ==
Note: Flags indicate national team as defined under FIFA eligibility rules; some limited exceptions apply. Players may hold more than one non-FIFA nationality.

No.	Pos.	Nation	Player
1	GK	KOR	Kwon Jung-Hyuk
2	MF	KOR	Choi Hyo-Jin
3	DF	KOR	Kim Gwang-Seok
4	DF	KOR	Lee Chang-Won
5	DF	KOR	Kim Sung-Keun
6	MF	KOR	Kim Gi-Dong
7	MF	KOR	Oh Seung-Bum
8	MF	KOR	Hwang Jin-Sung
9	MF	KOR	Hwang Ji-Soo
10	FW	BRA	Tavares
11	MF	KOR	Choi Jong-Bum
12	MF	KOR	Park Hee-Chul
13	MF	KOR	Shin Kwang-Hoon
15	FW	BRA	Jonhes
16	MF	KOR	Choi Tae-Uk
17	MF	KOR	Lee Gwang-Jae
18	FW	KOR	Ko Gi-Gu

No.	Pos.	Nation	Player
19	MF	KOR	Park Won-Jae
20	FW	BRA	Schwenck
21	GK	KOR	Shin Hwa-Yong
22	DF	KOR	Lee Won-Jae
23	FW	KOR	Cha Chul-Ho
24	DF	KOR	Hwang Jae-Won
25	MF	KOR	Kim Yoon-Sik
26	DF	KOR	Kim Soo-Yeon
27	MF	KOR	Kim Myung-Joong
28	MF	KOR	Ohn Byung-Hoon
29	MF	KOR	Lee Tae-Young
31	GK	KOR	Jung Sung-Ryong
32	DF	KOR	Lee Seung-Yeul
33	MF	KOR	Go Seul-Ki
35	MF	KOR	Lee Sung-Jae
37	DF	KOR	Cho Sung-Hwan
41	GK	KOR	Kim Hyun-Bum

== K-League ==
=== Regular season ===
Date	Opponents	H / A	Result F – A	Scorers	Attendance	League position
4 March	Incheon United	A	1 – 0	Ko Gi-Gu 10'	24,772	4th
10 March	Gyeongnam FC	A	3 – 1	Lee Gwang-Jae 31', 66', Hwang Jae-Won 61'	17,826	1st
17 March	Daejeon Citizen	H	1 – 1	Kim Gi-Dong 41'	10,042	3rd
1 April	Jeonbuk Hyundai Motors	A	2 – 1	Choi Hyo-Jin 4', Park Won-Jae 67'	6,943	2nd
7 April	Busan I'Park	H	0 – 1		4,528	3rd
15 April	Seongnam Ilhwa Chunma	A	1 – 1	Hwang Jin-Sung 32'	7,832	2nd
22 April	FC Seoul	H	0 – 0		12,596	2nd
29 April	Daegu FC	H	1 – 3	Kim Gi-Dong 29'	5,084	4th
5 May	Chunnam Dragons	A	1 – 2	own goal 36'	13,800	8th
13 May	Jeju United	H	0 – 1		5,077	10th
19 May	Gwangju Sangmu Phoenix	A	1 – 0	Kim Gi-Dong 0:40'	3,542	5th
26 May	Suwon Samsung Bluewings	H	0 – 0		12,106	6th
16 June	Ulsan Hyundai Horang-i	A	0 – 0		8,217	7th
8 August	Gyeongnam FC	H	2 – 1	Kim Gi-Dong 5', Schwenck 12'	2,240	6th
12 August	Daejeon Citizen	A	0 – 3		13,097	8th
15 August	Jeonbuk Hyundai Motors	H	1 – 3	Jonhes 86'	5,287	9th
18 August	Busan I'Park	A	2 – 1	Lee Gwang-Jae 72', own goal 75'	4,765	5th
25 August	Seongnam Ilhwa Chunma	H	2 – 1	Schwenck 3', Hwang Ji-Soo 55'	11,097	6th
29 August	FC Seoul	A	0 – 3		12,013	7th
1 September	Daegu FC	A	2 – 2	Tavares 53', Kim Soo-Yeon 64'	2,537	7th
15 September	Chunnam Dragons	H	1 – 0	Oh Seung-Bum 8'	1,735	5th
23 September	Jeju United	A	0 – 2		2,064	7th
29 September	Gwangju Sangmu Phoenix	H	2 – 1	Tavares 40', Jonhes 75'	5,396	5th
6 October	Suwon Samsung Bluewings	A	0 – 1		26,123	7th
10 October	Ulsan Hyundai Horang-i	H	1 – 0	Jonhes 21'	3,685	6th
14 October	Incheon United	H	3 – 2	Lee Gwang-Jae 12', Jonhes 29', Schwenck 81'	4,074	5th

Pos	Club	Pld	W	D	L	F	A	GD	Pts
4	Gyeongnam FC	26	13	4	9	41	31	+10	43
5	Pohang Steelers	26	11	6	9	27	31	−2	39
6	Daejeon Citizen	26	10	7	9	34	27	+7	37

Pld = Matches played; W = Matches won; D = Matches drawn; L = Matches lost; F = Goals for; A = Goals against; GD = Goal difference; Pts = Points

=== Play-off ===
Date	Round	Opponents	H / A	Result F – A	Scorers	Attendance
20 October	First Round	Gyeongnam FC	A	1 – 1 (4–3p)	Lee Gwang-Jae 68'	8,965
28 October	Second Round	Ulsan Hyundai Horang-i	A	2 – 1	Hwang Jae-Won 34', Lee Gwang-Jae 76'	31,783
31 October	Semifinal	Suwon Samsung Bluewings	A	1 – 0	Park Won-Jae 86'	33,824
4 November	Final 1st leg	Seongnam Ilhwa Chunma	H	3 – 1	Park Won-Jae 31', Ko Gi-Gu 73', Lee Gwang-Jae 74'	20,875
11 November	Final 2nd leg	Seongnam Ilhwa Chunma	A	1 – 0	Schwenck 43'	18,924

== Korean FA Cup ==
Date	Round	Opponents	H / A	Result F – A	Scorers	Attendance
12 June	Round 1	Konkuk University	H	4 – 1	Choi Tae-Uk 16', 73', Lee Gwang-Jae 54', Kim Gwang-Seok 55'	
1 August	Round of 16	Goyang Kookmin Bank	A	2 – 2 (4–2p)	Lee Chang-Won 60', Hwang Jae-Won 70'	
18 September	Quarterfinal	Ulsan Mipo Dockyard	A	2 – 0	Hwang Jae-Won 31', Lee Gwang-Jae 64'	
3 October	Semifinal	Jeju United	H	2 – 1	Tavares 10', Jonhes 57'	
25 November	Final 1st leg	Chunnam Dragons	A	2 – 3	Tavares 24' (p), Kim Gwang-Seok 50'	
2 December	Final 2nd leg	Chunnam Dragons	H	1 – 3	Hwang Jin-Sung 48'	

== League Cup ==
Date	Opponents	H / A	Result F – A	Scorers	Attendance	Group position
14 March	Ulsan Hyundai Horang-i	A	0 – 0		3,837	3rd
21 March	Jeju United	H	1 – 0	Hwang Jin-Sung 61' (pen.)	3,128	2nd
4 April	Jeonbuk Hyundai Motors	A	1 – 3	Kim Soo-Yeon 75'	3,327	4th
11 April	Daegu FC	H	0 – 0		2,352	5th
18 April	Incheon United	H	1 – 2	Tavares 43'	1,137	5th
25 April	Ulsan Hyundai Horang-i	H	0 – 2		1,527	6th
2 May	Jeju United	A	0 – 0		2,140	6th
9 May	Jeonbuk Hyundai Motors	H	0 – 0		1,074	6th
16 May	Daegu FC	A	3 – 1	Lee Won-Jae 46', Choi Hyo-Jin 74', Shin Kwang-Hoon 82'	2,583	4th
23 May	Incheon United	A	2 – 2	Choi Hyo-Jin 89', Choi Tae-Uk 90'	9,326	5th

Group A

Pos	Club	Pld	W	D	L	F	A	GD	Pts
4	Jeonbuk Hyundai Motors	10	3	3	4	9	10	−1	12
5	Pohang Steelers	10	2	5	3	8	10	−2	11
6	Jeju United	10	2	2	6	4	9	−5	8

Pld = Matches played; W = Matches won; D = Matches drawn; L = Matches lost; F = Goals for; A = Goals against; GD = Goal difference; Pts = Points

== Squad statistics ==
No.	Pos.	Name	League		FA Cup		League Cup		Total			Discipline	
No.	Pos.	Name	Apps	Goals	Apps	Goals	Apps	Goals	Apps	Total	Goals	Yellow card	Red card
1	GK	(South Korea) Kwon Jung-Hyuk	0 (1)	0	0	0	0 (1)	0	0 (2)	2	0	0	0
2	MF	(South Korea) Choi Hyo-Jin	16 (2)	1	3 (1)	0	5 (3)	2	24 (6)	30	3	6	0
3	DF	(South Korea) Kim Gwang-Seok	8 (3)	0	3 (2)	2	4 (1)	0	15 (6)	21	2	2	0
4	DF	(South Korea) Lee Chang-Won	15 (4)	0	3	1	3	0	21 (4)	25	1	3	1
5	DF	(South Korea) Kim Sung-Keun	19 (1)	0	4	0	2 (1)	0	25 (2)	27	0	5	0
6	MF	(South Korea) Kim Gi-Dong	30	4	6	0	4 (2)	0	40 (2)	42	4	3	0
7	MF	(South Korea) Oh Seung-Bum	9 (17)	1	2 (3)	0	7 (2)	0	18 (22)	40	1	3	0
8	MF	(South Korea) Hwang Jin-Sung	7 (10)	1	0 (2)	1	5 (1)	1	12 (13)	25	3	2	0
9	MF	(South Korea) Hwang Ji-Soo	26	1	5	0	5	0	36 (0)	36	1	6	0
10	FW	(Brazil) Tavares	27 (1)	2	6	2	6 (1)	1	39 (2)	41	5	1	1
11	MF	(South Korea) Choi Jong-Bum	0	0	0	0	0	0	0	0	0	0	0
12	MF	(South Korea) Park Hee-Chul	4	0	0	0	1 (1)	0	5 (1)	6	0	1	0
13	MF	(South Korea) Shin Kwang-Hoon	1 (1)	0	1 (1)	0	1 (2)	1	3 (4)	7	1	3	0
14	DF	(South Korea) Oh Bum-Seok	8 (3)	0	1	0	5	0	14 (3)	17	0	6	1
15	FW	(Brazil) Mauricio Fernandes	2 (1)	0	0	0	4 (1)	0	6 (2)	8	0	3	0
15	FW	(Brazil) Jonhes	12 (2)	4	1	1	0	0	13 (2)	15	5	1	0
16	MF	(South Korea) Choi Tae-Uk	4 (9)	0	2 (3)	2	3 (2)	1	9 (14)	23	3	0	0
17	FW	(South Korea) Lee Gwang-Jae	8 (16)	7	2 (3)	2	2 (3)	0	12 (22)	34	9	4	0
18	FW	(South Korea) Ko Gi-Gu	12 (6)	2	3	0	4 (1)	0	19 (7)	26	2	2	0
19	MF	(South Korea) Park Won-Jae	20 (2)	3	4 (1)	0	3	0	27 (3)	30	3	2	0
20	FW	(Brazil) Frontini	3	0	0	0	4 (2)	0	7 (2)	9	0	1	0
20	FW	(Brazil) Schwenck	16 (1)	4	5	0	0	0	21 (1)	22	4	5	0
21	GK	(South Korea) Shin Hwa-Yong	17 (1)	0	3	0	8	0	28 (1)	29	0	2	0
22	DF	(South Korea) Lee Won-Jae	0	0	0	0	5	1	5 (0)	5	1	0	0
23	FW	(South Korea) Cha Chul-Ho	0	0	0	0	0	0	0	0	0	0	0
24	DF	(South Korea) Hwang Jae-Won	28	2	5	2	4	0	37 (0)	37	4	4	0
25	MF	(South Korea) Kim Yoon-Sik	4 (4)	0	0 (1)	0	3 (1)	0	7 (6)	13	0	1	0
26	DF	(South Korea) Kim Soo-Yeon	7	1	0	0	6	1	13 (0)	13	2	6	0
27	MF	(South Korea) Kim Myung-Joong	1 (3)	0	0	0	6 (1)	0	7 (4)	11	0	3	0
28	MF	(South Korea) Ohn Byung-Hoon	0	0	0	0	0 (1)	0	0 (1)	1	0	1	0
29	DF	(South Korea) Lee Tae-Young	0	0	0	0	0	0	0	0	0	0	0
31	GK	(South Korea) Jung Sung-Ryong	14	0	3	0	2	0	19 (0)	19	0	1	0
32	DF	(South Korea) Lee Seung-Yeul	0	0	0	0	0 (1)	0	0 (1)	1	0	0	0
33	MF	(South Korea) Go Seul-Ki	0	0	0	0	0	0	0	0	0	0	0
35	FW	(South Korea) Lee Sung-Jae	0	0	0	0	0	0	0	0	0	0	0
37	DF	(South Korea) Cho Sung-Hwan	21	0	4	0	6	0	31 (0)	31	0	8	1
41	GK	(South Korea) Kim Hyun-Bum	0	0	0	0	0	0	0	0	0	0	0

== Transfers ==
=== In ===
Date	Pos.	Name	From	Source
17 November 2006	MF	(South Korea) Choi Jong-Bum	(South Korea) Gwangju Sangmu Phoenix	(in Korean)
17 November 2006	FW	(South Korea) Cha Chul-Ho	(South Korea) Gwangju Sangmu Phoenix	(in Korean)
17 November 2006	DF	(South Korea) Kim Gwang-Seok	(South Korea) Gwangju Sangmu Phoenix	(in Korean)
28 November 2006	GK	(South Korea) Kwon Jung-Hyuk	(South Korea) Ulsan Hyundai Horang-i	(in Korean)
20 December 2006	MF	(South Korea) Choi Hyo-Jin	(South Korea) Incheon United	(in Korean)
22 December 2006	DF	(South Korea) Lee Seung-Yeul	(South Korea) Halla University	(in Korean)
12 January 2007	DF	(Brazil) Mauricio Fernandes	(Portugal) SC Braga	(in Korean)
22 January 2007	FW	(South Korea) Lee Gwang-Jae	(South Korea) Chunnam Dragons	(in Korean)
29 June 2007	FW	(Brazil) Schwenck	(Israel) Beitar Jerusalem F.C.	(in Korean)
30 July 2007	FW	(Brazil) Jonhes	(Brazil) Brasiliense	(in Korean)

=== Out ===
Date	Pos.	Name	To	Source
20 December 2006	MF	(South Korea) Kim Tae-Won	(South Korea) Incheon United	(in Korean)
23 January 2007	FW	(South Korea) Lee Dong-Gook	(England) Middlesbrough F.C.	
29 June 2007	FW	(Brazil) Frontini	Released	(in Korean)
29 June 2007	DF	(Brazil) Mauricio Fernandes	Released	(in Korean)

Loan Out

Date	Pos.	Name	Moving To	End	Source
1 August 2007	MF	(South Korea) Oh Bum-Seok	(Japan) Yokohama FC	December 2007	(in Korean)
