= 2007 in South Korean football =

Football in South Korea
- Season: 2007

Men's football
- K League: Pohang Steelers
- National League: Hyundai Mipo Dockyard
- K3 League: Seoul United
- Korean FA Cup: Jeonnam Dragons
- Korean League Cup: Ulsan Hyundai Horang-i

This article shows the summary of 2007 football season in South Korea.

== National teams ==
=== AFC Asian Cup ===
After excluding three Premier League players (Park Ji-sung, Lee Young-pyo and Seol Ki-hyeon) due to their injuries, South Korea had difficulty again in the Asian Cup. Furthermore, some players including the captain Lee Woon-jae were criticised by fans for visiting a hostess bar in the middle of the group stage. South Korea's outfield players made only three goals during the competition. However, Lee led his team to third place by keeping four clean sheets and winning two penalty shoot-outs.

11 July Group D	South Korea	1–1	Saudi Arabia	Jakarta, Indonesia
19:35 UTC+7	Choi Sung-kuk 66'	Report	Y. Al-Qahtani 77' (pen.)	Stadium: Gelora Bung Karno Stadium; Attendance: 15,000; Referee: Mark Shield (Australia)

15 July Group D	Bahrain	2–1	South Korea	Jakarta, Indonesia
19:35 UTC+7	Isa 43'; Abdullatif 85'	Report	Kim Do-heon 4'	Stadium: Gelora Bung Karno Stadium; Attendance: 9,000; Referee: Sun Baojie (China)

18 July Group D	Indonesia	0–1	South Korea	Jakarta, Indonesia
17:20 UTC+7		Report	Kim Jung-woo 34'	Stadium: Gelora Bung Karno Stadium; Attendance: 88,000; Referee: Mark Shield (Australia)

Group D table
Pos	Team	Pld	W	D	L	GF	GA	GD	Pts	Qualification
1	Saudi Arabia	3	2	1	0	7	2	+5	7	Advance to knockout stage
2	South Korea	3	1	1	1	3	3	0	4	Advance to knockout stage
3	Indonesia (H)	3	1	0	2	3	4	−1	3	
4	Bahrain	3	1	0	2	3	7	−4	3	

22 July Quarter-finals	Iran	0–0 (a.e.t.) (2–4 p)	South Korea	Kuala Lumpur, Malaysia
18:20 UTC+8		Report		Stadium: Bukit Jalil Stadium; Attendance: 8,629; Referee: Ali Hamad Al-Badwawi (UAE)
	Penalties
	Zandi (penalty scored); Mahdavikia (penalty missed); Enayati (penalty scored); Khatibi (penalty missed)		(penalty scored) Lee Chun-soo; (penalty scored) Kim Sang-sik; (penalty missed) Kim Do-heon; (penalty scored) Cho Jae-jin; (penalty scored) Kim Jung-woo

25 July Semi-finals	Iraq	0–0 (a.e.t.) (4–3 p)	South Korea	Kuala Lumpur, Malaysia
18:20 UTC+8		Report		Stadium: Bukit Jalil Stadium; Attendance: 12,500; Referee: Saad Kamil Al-Fadhli (Kuwait)
	Penalties
	Mohammed (penalty scored); Munir (penalty scored); Abdul-Amir (penalty scored); Mnajed (penalty scored)		(penalty scored) Lee Chun-soo; (penalty scored) Lee Dong-gook; (penalty scored) Cho Jae-jin; (penalty missed) Yeom Ki-hun; (penalty missed) Kim Jung-woo

28 July Third place match	South Korea	0–0 (a.e.t.) (6–5 p)	Japan	Palembang, Indonesia
19:35 UTC+8		Report		Stadium: Jakabaring Stadium; Attendance: 10,000; Referee: Ali Hamad Al-Badwawi (UAE)
	Penalties
	Cho Jae-jin (penalty scored); Oh Beom-seok (penalty scored); Lee Chun-soo (penalty scored); Lee Ho (penalty scored); Kim Jin-kyu (penalty scored); Kim Chi-woo (penalty scored)		(penalty scored) S. Nakamura; (penalty scored) Endo; (penalty scored) Abe; (penalty scored) Komano; (penalty scored) Nakazawa; (penalty missed) Hanyu

=== Summer Olympics qualification ===
28 February AFC second round, Group F	South Korea	1–0	Yemen	Suwon, South Korea
20:00 KST (UTC+09)	Yang Dong-hyun 63'			Stadium: Suwon World Cup Stadium; Attendance: 11,672; Referee: Tan Hai (China PR)

14 March AFC second round, Group F	United Arab Emirates	1–3	South Korea	Abu Dhabi, United Arab Emirates
19:00 (UTC+04)	Saker 49'		Han Dong-won 22', 80'; Lee Seung-hyun 36'	Stadium: Al Nahyan Stadium; Attendance: 500; Referee: Tan Hai (China PR)

28 March AFC second round, Group F	South Korea	2–0	Uzbekistan	Ansan, South Korea
20:00 KST (UTC+09)	Han Dong-won 34', 84'			Stadium: Ansan Wa~ Stadium; Attendance: 32,377; Referee: Tallat Najm (Lebanon)

18 April AFC second round, Group F	Uzbekistan	0–1	South Korea	Tashkent, Uzbekistan
17:00 UZT (UTC+05)			Baek Ji-hoon 76'	Stadium: Pakhtakor Markaziy Stadium; Attendance: 5,000; Referee: K. Ibrahim (Kazakhstan)

16 May AFC second round, Group F	Yemen	1–0	South Korea	Sana'a, Yemen
17:00 (UTC+04)	Al-Baadani 41'			Stadium: Ali Mohsen Stadium; Attendance: 10,000; Referee: Krishma (Bangladesh)

6 June AFC second round, Group F	South Korea	3–1	United Arab Emirates	Daejeon, South Korea
20:00 KST (UTC+09)	Lee Keun-ho 32', 48'; Kim Chang-soo 80'		Khamis 70'	Stadium: Daejeon World Cup Stadium; Attendance: 30,510; Referee: Subkhiddin Mohd Salleh (Malaysia)

AFC second round, Group F table
Pos	Team	Pld	W	D	L	GF	GA	GD	Pts	Qualification
1	South Korea	6	5	0	1	10	3	+7	15	Advance to AFC third round
2	Uzbekistan	6	4	0	2	8	4	+4	12	Advance to AFC third round
3	United Arab Emirates	6	2	0	4	7	11	−4	6	
4	Yemen	6	1	0	5	2	9	−7	3	

Source: RSSSF

22 August AFC third round, Group B	South Korea	2–1	Uzbekistan	Seoul, South Korea
20:00 KST (UTC+09)	Lee Sang-ho 71'; Lee Keun-ho 78'		Kim Jin-kyu 45+1' (o.g.)	Stadium: Seoul World Cup Stadium; Attendance: 22,885; Referee: Ben Williams (Australia)

8 September AFC third round, Group B	Bahrain	0–1	South Korea	Riffa, Bahrain
19:00 (UTC+03)			Kang Min-soo 74'	Stadium: Bahrain National Stadium; Attendance: 400

12 September AFC third round, Group B	South Korea	1–0	Syria	Seoul, South Korea
20:00 KST (UTC+09)	Kim Seung-yong 9'			Stadium: Seoul World Cup Stadium; Attendance: 20,129; Referee: Yang Zhiqiang (China PR)

17 October AFC third round, Group B	Syria	0–0	South Korea	Damascus, Syria
15:00 EEST (UTC+03)				Stadium: Abbasiyyin Stadium; Attendance: 300; Referee: Hedayat Mombini (Iran)

17 November AFC third round, Group B	Uzbekistan	0–0	South Korea	Tashkent, Uzbekistan
15:00 UZT (UTC+05)			Baek Ji-hoon 76'	Stadium: Pakhtakor Markaziy Stadium; Attendance: 3,000; Referee: Abdullah Balideh (Qatar)

21 November AFC third round, Group B	South Korea	0–0	Bahrain	Ansan, South Korea
20:00 KST (UTC+09)				Stadium: Ansan Wa~ Stadium; Attendance: 28,221; Referee: Subkhiddin Mohd Salleh (Malaysia)

AFC third round, Group B table
Pos	Team	Pld	W	D	L	GF	GA	GD	Pts	Qualification
1	South Korea	6	3	3	0	4	1	+3	12	Qualification for Summer Olympics
2	Bahrain	6	3	2	1	7	4	+3	11	
3	Syria	6	0	4	2	5	7	−2	4	
4	Uzbekistan	6	0	3	3	5	9	−4	3	

Source: RSSSF

=== Friendlies ===
==== Senior team ====
6 February	South Korea	1–0	Greece	London, England
	Lee Chun-soo 78'

24 March	South Korea	0–2	Uruguay	Seoul, South Korea
			Bueno 19', 37'

2 June	South Korea	0–2	Netherlands	Seoul, South Korea
			Van der Vaart 31', 71'

29 June	South Korea	3–0	Iraq	Seogwipo, South Korea
	Yeom Ki-hun 50'; Lee Chun-soo 79'; Lee Keun-ho 85'

5 July	South Korea	2–1	Uzbekistan	Seoul, South Korea
	Cho Jae-jin 5', 19'		Djeparov 60'

==== Under-23 team ====
3 September	Qatar	0–0	South Korea	Dubai, United Arab Emirates
17:20 (UTC+04)				Stadium: Al-Rashid Stadium; Attendance: 300

== Leagues ==
=== K League ===
==== Regular season ====
Pos	Team	Pld	W	D	L	GF	GA	GD	Pts	Qualification
1	Seongnam Ilhwa Chunma	26	16	7	3	43	18	+25	55	Qualification for playoffs final
2	Suwon Samsung Bluewings	26	15	6	5	36	24	+12	51	Qualification for playoffs semi-final
3	Ulsan Hyundai Horang-i	26	12	9	5	34	22	+12	45	Qualification for playoffs first round
4	Gyeongnam FC	26	13	4	9	41	31	+10	43	Qualification for playoffs first round
5	Pohang Steelers	26	12	5	9	27	31	−4	41	Qualification for playoffs first round
6	Daejeon Citizen	26	10	7	9	34	27	+7	37	Qualification for playoffs first round
7	FC Seoul	26	8	13	5	23	16	+7	37	
8	Jeonbuk Hyundai Motors	26	9	9	8	36	32	+4	36	
9	Incheon United	26	8	9	9	30	32	−2	33	
10	Jeonnam Dragons	26	7	9	10	24	27	−3	30	Qualification for Champions League (Note: Qualified as champions of FA Cup.)
11	Jeju United	26	8	6	12	27	35	−8	30	
12	Daegu FC	26	6	6	14	35	46	−11	24	
13	Busan IPark	26	4	8	14	20	39	−19	20	
14	Gwangju Sangmu Bulsajo	26	2	6	18	14	44	−30	12	

Source: RSSSF

==== Championship playoffs ====
First round
3	Ulsan Hyundai Horang-i	2
6	Daejeon Citizen	0
4	Gyeongnam FC	1 (3)
5	Pohang Steelers (p)	1 (4)

Second round
Ulsan Hyundai Horang-i	1
Pohang Steelers	2

Semifinal
2	Suwon Samsung Bluewings	0
Pohang Steelers	1

Final
1	Seongnam Ilhwa Chunma	1	0	1
Pohang Steelers	3	1	4

==== Final table ====
Pos	Team	Qualification
1	Pohang Steelers (C)	Qualification for Champions League
2	Seongnam Ilhwa Chunma	
3	Suwon Samsung Bluewings	
4	Ulsan Hyundai Horang-i	
5	Gyeongnam FC	
6	Daejeon Citizen	

Source: RSSSF
(C) Champions

=== Korea National League ===
==== First stage ====
Pos	Team	Pld	W	D	L	GF	GA	GD	Pts	Qualification
1	Hyundai Mipo Dockyard	11	8	1	2	20	7	+13	25	Qualification for playoff
2	Gangneung City	11	8	1	2	19	10	+9	25	
3	Incheon Korail	11	7	1	3	16	10	+6	22	
4	Suwon City	11	5	1	5	15	13	+2	16	
5	Daejeon KHNP	11	3	5	3	13	10	+3	14	
6	Goyang KB Kookmin Bank	11	7	2	2	20	8	+12	13 (Note: Goyang KB Kookmin Bank was docked 10 points due to the refusal of promotion.)	
7	Busan Transportation Corporation	11	3	4	4	15	14	+1	13	
8	Icheon Hummel Korea	11	3	3	5	11	13	−2	12	
9	Ansan Hallelujah	11	3	3	5	9	15	−6	12	
10	Seosan Omega	11	2	2	7	11	21	−10	8	
11	Changwon City	11	2	2	7	8	19	−11	8	
12	Yeosu INGNEX	11	2	1	8	11	28	−17	7	

Source: RSSSF

==== Second stage ====
Pos	Team	Pld	W	D	L	GF	GA	GD	Pts	Qualification
1	Suwon City	11	10	1	0	25	8	+17	31	Qualification for playoff
2	Hyundai Mipo Dockyard	11	6	4	1	20	11	+9	22	
3	Incheon Korail	11	6	2	3	20	18	+2	20	
4	Gangneung City	11	5	2	4	21	15	+6	17	
5	Busan Transportation Corporation	11	4	3	4	16	16	0	15	
6	Changwon City	11	4	2	5	16	23	−7	14	
7	Ansan Hallelujah	11	3	4	4	16	17	−1	13	
8	Icheon Hummel Korea	11	1	8	2	12	12	0	11	
9	Goyang KB Kookmin Bank	11	6	2	3	26	13	+13	10 (Note: Goyang KB Kookmin Bank was docked 10 points due to the refusal of promotion.)	
10	Daejeon KHNP	11	1	4	6	7	17	−10	7	
11	Seosan Omega	11	1	2	8	13	27	−14	5	
12	Yeosu INGNEX	11	1	2	8	12	27	−15	5	

Source: RSSSF

==== Championship playoff ====
Team 1	Agg.	Team 2	1st leg	2nd leg
Hyundai Mipo Dockyard (C)	7–1	Suwon City	3–0	4–1

=== K3 League ===
==== Regular season ====
Pos	Team	Pld	W	D	L	GF	GA	GD	Pts	Qualification
1	Seoul United (C)	18	10	7	1	42	18	+24	37	Qualification for playoffs
2	Hwaseong Shinwoo Electronics	18	11	4	3	29	16	+13	37	First stage winners
3	Yongin FC	18	10	6	2	35	15	+20	36	Qualification for playoffs
4	Cheonan FC	18	8	7	3	30	14	+16	31	Second stage winners
5	Jeonju EM Korea	18	7	8	3	40	20	+20	29	
6	Daegu Korea Powertrain	18	8	4	6	37	37	0	28	
7	Yangju Citizen	18	5	2	11	22	37	−15	17	
8	Changwon Doodae	18	2	6	10	28	47	−19	12	
9	Eunpyeong Chung-goo Sungshim Hospital	18	3	2	13	19	38	−19	11	
10	Asan FC	18	2	2	14	18	58	−40	8	

Source: JoinKFA
(C) Champions

==== Championship playoffs ====
Semi-finals
Hwaseong Shinwoo Electronics	1
Yongin FC	0
Cheonan FC	1 (1)
Seoul United (p)	1 (3)

Final
Hwaseong Shinwoo Electronics	0	0	0
Seoul United	1	2	3

== Domestic cups ==
=== Korean FA Cup ===
Round of 16
Hyundai Mipo Dockyard (p)	2 (4)
Gyeongnam FC	2 (2)
Goyang KB Kookmin Bank	2 (2)
Pohang Steelers (p)	2 (4)
Jeju United (p)	1 (5)
Seongnam Ilhwa Chunma	1 (4)
Daejeon Citizen	0
Busan IPark	2
Jeonnam Dragons	1
Jeonbuk Hyundai Motors	0
Gwangju Sangmu	1
Ulsan Hyundai Horang-i	3
Daegu FC	2
Incheon United	3
FC Seoul (p)	0 (4)
Suwon Samsung Bluewings	0 (2)

Quarter-finals
Hyundai Mipo Dockyard	0
Pohang Steelers	2
Jeju United (p)	0 (5)
Busan IPark	0 (4)
Jeonnam Dragons (p)	0 (4)
Ulsan Hyundai Horang-i	0 (2)
Incheon United	2
FC Seoul	1

Semi-finals
Pohang Steelers	2
Jeju United	1
Jeonnam Dragons	2
Incheon United	0

Final
Pohang Steelers	2	1	3
Jeonnam Dragons	3	3	6

=== Korean League Cup ===
==== Group stage ====
Group A
Pos	Team	Pld	Pts
1	Ulsan Hyundai Horang-i	10	19
2	Incheon United	10	19
3	Daegu FC	10	13
4	Jeonbuk Hyundai Motors	10	12
5	Pohang Steelers	10	11
6	Jeju United	10	8

Source: RSSSF

Group B
Pos	Team	Pld	Pts
1	FC Seoul	10	21
2	Suwon Samsung Bluewings	10	17
3	Gwangju Sangmu Bulsajo	10	12
4	Busan IPark	10	11
5	Daejeon Citizen	10	11
6	Gyeongnam FC	10	7

Source: RSSSF

==== Knockout stage ====
Quarter-finals
L	Seongnam Ilhwa Chunma	1
B2	Suwon Samsung Bluewings (a.e.t.)	4
FA	Jeonnam Dragons	1
A2	Incheon United	2

Semi-finals
A1	Ulsan Hyundai Horang-i	1
Suwon Samsung Bluewings	0
B1	FC Seoul (p)	1 (4)
Incheon United	1 (3)

Final
Ulsan Hyundai Horang-i	2
FC Seoul	1

=== Korea National League Championship ===
==== Group stage ====
Group A
Pos	Team	Pld	Pts
1	Busan Transportation Corporation	3	7
2	Hyundai Mipo Dockyard	3	6
3	Gumi Siltron	3	4
4	Daejeon KHNP	3	0

Source: Report

Group B
Pos	Team	Pld	Pts
1	Goyang KB Kookmin Bank	3	9
2	Changwon City	3	6
3	Ansan Hallelujah	3	3
4	Jeonju EM	3	0

Source: Report

Group C
Pos	Team	Pld	Pts
1	Suwon City	3	9
2	Incheon Korail	3	6
3	Icheon Hummel Korea	3	3
4	Asan FC	3	0

Source: Report

Group D
Pos	Team	Pld	Pts
1	Gangneung City	3	7
2	Seosan Omega	3	7
3	Cheonan FC	3	1
4	Yeosu INGNEX	3	1

Source: Report

==== Knockout stage ====
Quarter-finals
Busan Transportation Corporation	0
Incheon Korail	1
Goyang KB Kookmin Bank	6
Seosan Omega	4
Suwon City	2
Hyundai Mipo Dockyard	0
Gangneung City	0
Changwon City	1

Semi-finals
Incheon Korail	0
Goyang KB Kookmin Bank	4
Suwon City (p)	0 (4)
Changwon City	0 (2)

Final
Goyang KB Kookmin Bank	0
Suwon City	1

== International cups ==
=== AFC Champions League ===
Team	Result	Round	Aggregate	Score	Venue	Opponent
Jeonbuk Hyundai Motors	Quarter-finals	Quarter-finals	1–4	1–2	Away	(Japan) Urawa Red Diamonds
Jeonbuk Hyundai Motors	Quarter-finals	Quarter-finals	1–4	0–2	Home	(Japan) Urawa Red Diamonds
Jeonnam Dragons	Group stage	Group F	Runners-up	0–0	Away	(Thailand) Bangkok University
Jeonnam Dragons	Group stage	Group F	Runners-up	3–2	Home	(Thailand) Bangkok University
Jeonnam Dragons	Group stage	Group F	Runners-up	2–0	Home	(Indonesia) Arema
Jeonnam Dragons	Group stage	Group F	Runners-up	1–0	Away	(Indonesia) Arema
Jeonnam Dragons	Group stage	Group F	Runners-up	1–3	Home	(Japan) Kawasaki Frontale
Jeonnam Dragons	Group stage	Group F	Runners-up	0–3	Away	(Japan) Kawasaki Frontale
Seongnam Ilhwa Chunma	Semi-finals	Group G	Winners	4–1	Home	(Vietnam) Dong Tam Long An
Seongnam Ilhwa Chunma	Semi-finals	Group G	Winners	2–1	Away	(Vietnam) Dong Tam Long An
Seongnam Ilhwa Chunma	Semi-finals	Group G	Winners	1–2	Away	(China) Shandong Luneng Taishan
Seongnam Ilhwa Chunma	Semi-finals	Group G	Winners	3–0	Home	(China) Shandong Luneng Taishan
Seongnam Ilhwa Chunma	Semi-finals	Group G	Winners	2–2	Away	(Australia) Adelaide United
Seongnam Ilhwa Chunma	Semi-finals	Group G	Winners	1–0	Home	(Australia) Adelaide United
Seongnam Ilhwa Chunma	Semi-finals	Quarter-finals	4–1	2–1	Home	(Syria) Al-Karamah
Seongnam Ilhwa Chunma	Semi-finals	Quarter-finals	4–1	2–0	Away	(Syria) Al-Karamah
Seongnam Ilhwa Chunma	Semi-finals	Semi-finals	4–4 (3–5 p)	2–2	Home	(Japan) Urawa Red Diamonds
Seongnam Ilhwa Chunma	Semi-finals	Semi-finals	4–4 (3–5 p)	2–2 (a.e.t.)	Away	(Japan) Urawa Red Diamonds

== See also ==
- Football in South Korea
