= Changwon FC =

Changwon FC may refer to:

- Changwon City FC, founded 2005
- Changwon United FC (formerly Changwon Doodae FC), 1988–2008
