= 2010 in South Korean football =

Football in South Korea
- Season: 2010

Men's football
- K League: FC Seoul
- National League: Suwon City
- K3 League: Suwon City
- Korean FA Cup: Suwon Samsung Bluewings
- Korean League Cup: FC Seoul

Women's football
- WK League: Suwon FMC

This article shows a summary of the 2010 football season in South Korea.

== National teams ==
=== FIFA World Cup ===
The Korean FA appointed Hiddink's predecessor Huh Jung-moo as the manager again after Pim Verbeek resigned due to mental stress at the 2007 AFC Asian Cup. Under Huh, South Korea won their group in the final round (fourth round) of the Asian qualifiers with four victories and four draws without a loss, easily qualifying for the 2010 tournament. Park Ji-sung, Park Chu-young, Lee Chung-yong, and Ki Sung-yueng were in charge of South Korea's attack in the qualifiers, and were evaluated as four key players among the squad of the time.

South Korea finished second in the Group B with four points, qualifying for the knockout stage. They were then eliminated from the tournament after losing to Uruguay in the round of 16.

12 June Group B	South Korea	2–0	Greece	Port Elizabeth, South Africa
13:30 UTC+2	Lee Jung-soo 7'; Park Ji-sung 52'	Report		Stadium: Nelson Mandela Bay Stadium; Attendance: 31,513; Referee: Michael Hester (New Zealand)

17 June Group B	Argentina	4–1	South Korea	Johannesburg, South Africa
13:30 UTC+2	Park Chu-young 17' (o.g.); Higuaín 33', 76', 80'	Report	Lee Chung-yong 45+1'	Stadium: Soccer City; Attendance: 82,174; Referee: Frank De Bleeckere (Belgium)

22 June Group B	Nigeria	2–2	South Korea	Durban, South Africa
20:30 UTC+2	Uche 12'; Yakubu 69' (pen.)	Report	Lee Jung-soo 38'; Park Chu-young 49'	Stadium: Moses Mabhida Stadium; Attendance: 61,874; Referee: Olegário Benquerença (Portugal)

Group B table
Pos	Team	Pld	W	D	L	GF	GA	GD	Pts	Qualification
1	Argentina	3	3	0	0	7	1	+6	9	Advance to knockout stage
2	South Korea	3	1	1	1	5	6	–1	4	Advance to knockout stage
3	Greece	3	1	0	2	2	5	–3	3	
4	Nigeria	3	0	1	2	3	5	–2	1	

26 June Round of 16	Uruguay	2–1	South Korea	Port Elizabeth, South Africa
16:00 UTC+2	Suárez 8', 80'	Report	Lee Chung-yong 68'	Stadium: Nelson Mandela Bay Stadium; Attendance: 30,597; Referee: Wolfgang Stark (Germany)

=== EAFF Championship ===
7 February	South Korea	5–0	Hong Kong	Tokyo, Japan
19:15	Kim Jung-woo 10'; Koo Ja-cheol 24'; Lee Dong-gook 32'; Lee Seung-ryul 37'; Noh Byung-jun 90+3'	Report		Stadium: Japan National Stadium; Attendance: 2,728; Referee: Ryuji Sato (Japan)

10 February	South Korea	0–3	China	Tokyo, Japan
19:15		Report	Yu Hai 5'; Gao Lin 27'; Deng Zhuoxiang 60'	Stadium: Ajinomoto Stadium; Attendance: 3,629; Referee: Ng Kai Lam (Hong Kong)

14 February	Japan	1–3	South Korea	Tokyo, Japan
19:15	Endō 23' (pen.)	Report	Lee Dong-gook 33' (pen.); Lee Seung-ryul 39'; Kim Jae-sung 70'	Stadium: Japan National Stadium; Attendance: 42,951; Referee: Strebre Delovski (Australia)

Pos	Team	Pld	W	D	L	GF	GA	GD	Pts
1	China (C)	3	2	1	0	5	0	+5	7
2	South Korea	3	2	0	1	8	4	+4	6
3	Japan (H)	3	1	1	1	4	3	+1	4
4	Hong Kong	3	0	0	3	0	10	−10	0

=== Asian Games ===
8 November Group C	South Korea	0–1	North Korea	Guangzhou, China
16:00 CST (UTC+08)			Ri Kwang-chon 36'	Stadium: Yuexiushan Stadium; Attendance: 5,000; Referee: Ben Williams (Australia)

10 November Group C	South Korea	4–0	Jordan	Guangzhou, China
16:00 CST (UTC+08)	Koo Ja-cheol 21', 44'; Kim Bo-kyung 46'; Cho Young-cheol 78'			Stadium: Yuexiushan Stadium; Referee: Tayeb Shamsuzzaman (Bangladesh)

13 November Group C	South Korea	3–0	Palestine	Guangzhou, China
16:00 CST (UTC+08)	Yoon Bit-garam 10'; Park Chu-young 13'; Park Hee-sung 52'			Stadium: Yuexiushan Stadium; Attendance: 10,000; Referee: Ibrahim Al-Hosni (Oman)

Group C table
Pos	Team	Pld	W	D	L	GF	GA	GD	Pts	Qualification
1	North Korea	3	3	0	0	7	0	+7	9	Advance to knockout stage
2	South Korea	3	2	0	1	7	1	+6	6	Advance to knockout stage
3	Palestine	3	0	1	2	0	6	−6	1	
4	Jordan	3	0	1	2	0	7	−7	1	

Source: RSSSF

15 November Round of 16	China	0–3	South Korea	Guangzhou, China
19:00 CST (UTC+08)			Kim Jung-woo 20'; Park Chu-young 50'; Cho Young-cheol 58'	Stadium: Tianhe Stadium; Attendance: 55,000; Referee: Saeid Mozaffarizadeh (Iran)

19 November Quarter-finals	South Korea	3–1 (a.e.t.)	Uzbekistan	Guangzhou, China
19:00 CST (UTC+08)	Hong Jeong-ho 3'; Park Chu-young 93'; Kim Bo-kyung 102'		Karimov 72'	Stadium: Tianhe Stadium; Attendance: 40,000; Referee: Minoru Tojo (Japan)

23 November Semi-finals	South Korea	0–1 (a.e.t.)	United Arab Emirates	Guangzhou, China
19:00 CST (UTC+08)			Ali 120+2'	Stadium: Tianhe Stadium; Attendance: 40,000; Referee: Ben Williams (Australia)

25 November Bronze medal match	South Korea	4–3	Iran	Guangzhou, China
15:30 CST (UTC+08)	Koo Ja-cheol 48'; Park Chu-young 77'; Ji Dong-won 88', 89'		Rezaei 5'; Aliaskari 45+2'; Ansarifard 49'	Stadium: Tianhe Stadium; Attendance: 40,000; Referee: Kadhum Auda (Iraq)

=== Friendlies ===
==== Senior team ====
9 January	South Korea	2–4	Zambia	Johannesburg, South Africa
16:30	Kim Jung-woo 35'; Koo Ja-cheol 83'	Report	F. Katongo 7'; Kalaba 15'; Chamanga 58'; Chivuta 73'	Stadium: Rand Stadium; Attendance: 2,000; Referee: Victor Gornes (South Africa)

18 January	South Korea	2–0	Finland	Málaga, Spain
15:30	Oh Beom-seok 39'; Lee Jung-soo 61'	Report		Stadium: Estadio Ciudad de Málaga; Attendance: 270; Referee: Fernandez Borbalon (Spain)

22 January	South Korea	1–0	Latvia	Málaga, Spain
15:10	Kim Jae-sung 55'	Report		Stadium: Estadio Ciudad de Málaga; Attendance: 150; Referee: Carlos Velasco Carballo (Spain)

3 March	South Korea	2–0	Ivory Coast	London, England
14:30	Lee Dong-gook 4'; Kwak Tae-hwi 90+2'	Report		Stadium: Loftus Road; Attendance: 5,000; Referee: Andre Morriner (England)

16 May	South Korea	2–0	Ecuador	Seoul, South Korea
19:00	Lee Seung-ryul 73'; Lee Chung-yong 84'	Report		Stadium: Seoul World Cup Stadium; Attendance: 62,209; Referee: Porached Wongkamdee (Thailand)

24 May	Japan	0–2	South Korea	Saitama, Japan
19:20		Report	Park Ji-sung 6'; Park Chu-young 90+1' (pen.)	Stadium: Saitama Stadium 2002; Attendance: 57,873; Referee: Stuart Attwell (England)

30 May	South Korea	0–1	Belarus	Kufstein, Austria
15:00		Report	Kislyak 52'	Stadium: Kufstein Arena; Attendance: 300; Referee: Bernhard Brugger (Austria)

3 June	South Korea	0–1	Spain	Innsbruck, Austria
18:00		Report	Navas 86'	Stadium: Tivoli Stadion Tirol; Attendance: 8,000; Referee: Robert Schörgenhofer (Austria)

11 August	South Korea	2–1	Nigeria	Suwon, South Korea
20:00	Yoon Bit-garam 16'; Choi Hyo-jin 44'	Report	Odemwingie 26'	Stadium: Suwon World Cup Stadium; Attendance: 40,331; Referee: Yuichi Nishimura (Japan)

7 September	South Korea	0–1	Iran	Seoul, South Korea
20:00		Report	Shojaei 34'	Stadium: Seoul World Cup Stadium; Attendance: 38,642; Referee: Subkhiddin Salleh (Malaysia)

12 October	South Korea	0–0	Japan	Seoul, South Korea
20:00		Report		Stadium: Seoul World Cup Stadium; Attendance: 62,503; Referee: Ravshan Irmatov (Uzbekistan)

30 December	South Korea	1–0	Syria	Abu Dhabi, United Arab Emirates
13:50	Ji Dong-won 83'	Report		Stadium: Baniyas Stadium; Attendance: 500; Referee: Facid Ali (United Arab Emirates)

==== Under-23 team ====
25 July	Malaysia	1–0	South Korea	Kuala Lumpur, Malaysia
15:00 MST (UTC+08)	Safiq 51'			Stadium: Bukit Jalil National Stadium; Attendance: 10,000; Referee: Subkhiddin Mohd Salleh (Malaysia)

== Leagues ==
=== K League ===
==== Regular season ====
Pos	Team	Pld	W	D	L	GF	GA	GD	Pts	Qualification
1	FC Seoul	28	20	2	6	58	26	+32	62	Qualification for playoffs final
2	Jeju United	28	17	8	3	54	25	+29	59	Qualification for playoffs semi-final
3	Jeonbuk Hyundai Motors	28	15	6	7	54	36	+18	51	Qualification for playoffs first round
4	Ulsan Hyundai	28	15	5	8	47	30	+17	50	Qualification for playoffs first round
5	Seongnam Ilhwa Chunma	28	13	9	6	46	26	+20	48	Qualification for playoffs first round
6	Gyeongnam FC	28	13	9	6	41	32	+9	48	Qualification for playoffs first round
7	Suwon Samsung Bluewings	28	12	5	11	39	44	−5	41	Qualification for Champions League (Note: Qualified as champions of FA Cup.)
8	Busan IPark	28	8	9	11	36	37	−1	33	
9	Pohang Steelers	28	8	9	11	39	48	−9	33	
10	Jeonnam Dragons	28	8	8	12	40	49	−9	32	
11	Incheon United	28	8	7	13	42	51	−9	31	
12	Gangwon FC	28	8	6	14	36	50	−14	30	
13	Daejeon Citizen	28	5	7	16	27	50	−23	22	
14	Gwangju Sangmu	28	3	10	15	17	43	−26	19	
15	Daegu FC	28	5	4	19	28	57	−29	19	

Source: K League (in Korean)
Rules for classification: 1) Points; 2) Goal difference; 3) Goals scored

==== Championship playoffs ====
First round
3	Jeonbuk Hyundai Motors	2
6	Gyeongnam FC	0
4	Ulsan Hyundai	1
5	Seongnam Ilhwa Chunma	3

Second round
Jeonbuk Hyundai Motors	1
Seongnam Ilhwa Chunma	0

Semifinal
2	Jeju United	1
Jeonbuk Hyundai Motors	0

Final
1	FC Seoul	2	2	4
Jeju United	2	1	3

==== Final table ====
Pos	Team	Qualification
1	FC Seoul (C)	Qualification for Champions League
2	Jeju United	Qualification for Champions League
3	Jeonbuk Hyundai Motors	Qualification for Champions League
4	Seongnam Ilhwa Chunma	
5	Ulsan Hyundai	
6	Gyeongnam FC	

Source: RSSSF
(C) Champion

=== Korea National League ===
==== Regular season ====
Pos	Team	Pld	W	D	L	GF	GA	GD	Pts	Qualification
1	Gangneung City	28	15	6	7	47	33	+14	51	Second stage winners
2	Goyang KB Kookmin Bank	28	14	7	7	39	27	+12	49	Qualification for playoffs
3	Suwon City (C)	28	13	10	5	32	22	+10	49	Qualification for playoffs
4	Busan Transportation Corporation	28	13	8	7	45	31	+14	47	
5	Cheonan City	28	14	5	9	44	30	+14	47	
6	Yongin City	28	12	9	7	41	29	+12	45	
7	Hyundai Mipo Dockyard	28	12	8	8	40	24	+16	44	
8	Chungju Hummel	28	13	2	13	48	53	−5	41	
9	Changwon City	28	11	7	10	37	29	+8	40	
10	Daejeon KHNP	28	11	6	11	45	43	+2	39	First stage winners
11	Incheon Korail	28	9	10	9	40	38	+2	37	
12	Gimhae City	28	10	6	12	29	36	−7	36	
13	Ansan Hallelujah	28	9	1	18	35	48	−13	28	
14	Mokpo City	28	4	8	16	21	38	−17	20	
15	Yesan FC	28	3	1	24	35	97	−62	10	

Source: Korea National League (in Korean)
Rules for classification: 1) Points; 2) Goal difference; 3) Goals scored
(C) Champions

==== Championship playoffs ====
Semi-finals
Daejeon KHNP	2
Goyang KB Kookmin Bank	1
Gangneung City	1
Suwon City	3

Final
Daejeon KHNP	0	1	1
Suwon City	2	0	2

=== K3 League ===
==== Group A ====
Pos	Team	Pld	W	D	L	GF	GA	GD	Pts	Qualification
1	Samcheok Shinwoo Electronics	25	18	4	3	48	16	+32	58	Qualification for playoffs
2	Gyeongju Citizen	25	17	4	4	71	26	+45	55	Qualification for playoffs
3	Cheongju Jikji	25	13	7	5	47	24	+23	46	Qualification for FA Cup first round
4	Bucheon FC 1995	25	14	4	7	50	35	+15	46	Qualification for FA Cup first round
5	Jeonju EM	25	14	2	9	52	34	+18	44	Qualification for FA Cup first round
6	Yongin Citizen	25	10	5	10	47	47	0	35	
7	Asan United	25	7	1	17	20	65	−45	22	
8	Seoul FC Martyrs	25	2	2	21	31	88	−57	8	
9	Goyang Citizen	25	1	2	22	24	86	−62	5	

Source: KFA (in Korean)
Rules for classification: 1) Points; 2) Goal difference; 3) Goals scored

==== Group B ====
Pos	Team	Pld	W	D	L	GF	GA	GD	Pts	Qualification
1	Icheon Citizen	25	16	4	5	85	41	+44	52	Qualification for playoffs
2	Yangju Citizen	25	16	3	6	59	41	+18	51	Qualification for playoffs
3	FC Pocheon	25	14	8	3	49	26	+23	50	Qualification for FA Cup first round
4	Namyangju United	25	12	5	8	56	32	+24	41	Qualification for FA Cup first round
5	Seoul United	25	10	8	7	47	31	+16	38	Qualification for FA Cup first round
6	Gwangju Gwangsan FC	25	11	3	11	42	39	+3	36	
7	Cheonan FC	25	9	2	14	45	60	−15	29	
8	Chuncheon FC	25	6	2	17	36	68	−32	20	
9	Yeonggwang FC	25	1	2	22	19	69	−50	5	

Source: KFA (in Korean)
Rules for classification: 1) Points; 2) Goal difference; 3) Goals scored

==== Championship playoffs ====
Semi-finals
Samcheok Shinwoo Electronics (p)	0 (6)
Yangju Citizen	0 (5)
Icheon Citizen	0 (2)
Gyeongju Citizen (p)	0 (4)

Final
Samcheok Shinwoo Electronics	0	0	0
Gyeongju Citizen	0	1	1

==== Final table ====
Pos	Team	Qualification
1	Gyeongju Citizen (C)	Qualification for FA Cup second round
2	Samcheok Shinwoo Electronics	Qualification for FA Cup first round
3	Icheon Citizen	Qualification for FA Cup first round
4	Yangju Citizen	Qualification for FA Cup first round

Source: RSSSF
(C) Champion

=== WK League ===
==== Regular season ====
Pos	Team	Pld	W	D	L	GF	GA	GD	Pts	Qualification
1	Incheon Hyundai Steel Red Angels	20	13	2	5	32	21	+11	41	Qualification for Championship
2	Suwon FMC (C)	20	12	3	5	29	17	+12	39	Qualification for Championship
3	Daekyo Kangaroos	20	12	2	6	37	17	+20	38	
4	Seoul City Amazones	20	7	2	11	23	32	−9	23	
5	Chungnam Ilhwa Chunma	20	5	4	11	19	35	−16	19	
6	Busan Sangmu	20	3	3	14	24	42	−18	12	

Source: WK League (in Korean)
Rules for classification: 1) Points; 2) Goal difference; 3) Goals scored
(C) Champions

==== Championship playoff ====
Team 1	Agg.	Team 2	1st leg	2nd leg
Suwon FMC	2–1	Incheon Hyundai Steel Red Angels	0–1	2–0

== Domestic cups ==
=== Korean FA Cup ===
Round of 32
Busan IPark	3
Incheon Korail	0
FC Seoul (p)	1 (4)
Mokpo City	1 (3)
Ansan Hallelujah	1
Incheon United	2
Daejeon KHNP (a.e.t.)	1
Gangwon FC	0
Changwon City	2
Gyeongnam FC	3
Jeonnam Dragons	6
Gimhae City	2
Gwangju Sangmu	3
Hyundai Mipo Dockyard	0
Pohang Steelers	5
Chungju Hummel	1
Suwon Samsung Bluewings	2
Dongguk University	0
Suwon City (a.e.t.)	1
Daegu FC	0
Jeonbuk Hyundai Motors	5
Jeonju University	0
Cheonan City	1
Gangneung City (a.e.t.)	2
Daejeon Citizen	3
Kyung Hee University	1
Seongnam Ilhwa Chunma	1
Yongin City	0
Busan Transportation Corporation	1
Jeju United	3
Ulsan Hyundai	5
Goyang KB Kookmin Bank	2

Round of 16
Busan IPark	2
FC Seoul	1
Incheon United	2
Daejeon KHNP	0
Gyeongnam FC	4
Jeonnam Dragons	7
Gwangju Sangmu (a.e.t.)	2
Pohang Steelers	1
Suwon Samsung Bluewings	4
Suwon City	1
Jeonbuk Hyundai Motors	2
Gangneung City	1
Daejeon Citizen	0
Seongnam Ilhwa Chunma	3
Jeju United	1
Ulsan Hyundai	0

Quarter-finals
Busan IPark (a.e.t.)	2
Incheon United	1
Jeonnam Dragons	2
Gwangju Sangmu	1
Suwon Samsung Bluewings	2
Jeonbuk Hyundai Motors	0
Seongnam Ilhwa Chunma	0
Jeju United	2

Semi-finals
29 September – Busan
Busan IPark (a.e.t.)	3
Jeonnam Dragons	2
29 September – Suwon
Suwon Samsung Bluewings (p)	0 (4)
Jeju United	0 (2)

Final
24 October – Busan
Busan IPark	0
Suwon Samsung Bluewings	1

=== Korean League Cup ===
==== Group stage ====
Group A
Pos	Team	Pld	Pts
1	Jeonbuk Hyundai Motors	4	10
2	Gyeongnam FC	4	9
3	Suwon Samsung Bluewings	4	6
4	Jeonnam Dragons	4	4
5	Gangwon FC	4	0

Source: RSSSF

Group B
Pos	Team	Pld	Pts
1	FC Seoul	4	8
2	Jeju United	4	7
3	Ulsan Hyundai	4	5
4	Seongnam Ilhwa Chunma	4	3
5	Gwangju Sangmu	4	2

Source: RSSSF

Group C
Pos	Team	Pld	Pts
1	Busan IPark	4	9
2	Daegu FC	4	6
3	Pohang Steelers	4	5
4	Incheon United	4	4
5	Daejeon Citizen	4	4

Source: RSSSF

==== Knockout stage ====
Quarter-finals
A1	Jeonbuk Hyundai Motors	2
B3	Ulsan Hyundai	0
A2	Gyeongnam FC (p)	1 (4)
B2	Jeju United	1 (3)
B1	FC Seoul (p)	2 (5)
C2	Daegu FC	2 (3)
C1	Busan IPark	3 (5)
A3	Suwon Samsung Bluewings (p)	3 (6)

Semi-finals
Jeonbuk Hyundai Motors	2
Gyeongnam FC	1
FC Seoul (a.e.t.)	4
Suwon Samsung Bluewings	2

Final
Jeonbuk Hyundai Motors	0
FC Seoul	3

=== Korea National League Championship ===
==== Group stage ====
Group A
Pos	Team	Pld	Pts
1	Hyundai Mipo Dockyard	2	4
2	Goyang KB Kookmin Bank	2	4
3	Hyundai Mipo Dockyard	2	0

Source: Report

Group B
Pos	Team	Pld	Pts
1	Yongin City	3	6
2	Gangneung City	3	5
3	Incheon Korail	3	4
4	Gimhae City	3	1

Source: Report

Group C
Pos	Team	Pld	Pts
1	Daejeon KHNP	3	6
2	Ansan Hallelujah	3	6
3	Changwon City	3	6
4	Yesan FC	3	0

Source: Report

Group D
Pos	Team	Pld	Pts
1	Busan Transportation Corporation	3	6
2	Suwon City	3	5
3	Mokpo City	3	4
4	Cheonan City	3	1

Source: Report

==== Knockout stage ====
Quarter-finals
Hyundai Mipo Dockyard	4
Ansan Hallelujah	1
Yongin City	0 (1)
Suwon City (p)	0 (3)
Daejeon KHNP	0
Goyang KB Kookmin Bank	2
Busan Transportation Corporation	4
Gangneung City	1

Semi-finals
Hyundai Mipo Dockyard	2
Suwon City	0
Goyang KB Kookmin Bank	0
Busan Transportation Corporation	2

Final
Hyundai Mipo Dockyard	1
Busan Transportation Corporation	2

== International cups ==
=== AFC Champions League ===
Team	Result	Round	Aggregate	Score	Venue	Opponent
Jeonbuk Hyundai Motors	Quarter-finals	Group F	Runners-up	4–1	Away	(Indonesia) Persipura Jayapura
Jeonbuk Hyundai Motors	Quarter-finals	Group F	Runners-up	8–0	Home	(Indonesia) Persipura Jayapura
Jeonbuk Hyundai Motors	Quarter-finals	Group F	Runners-up	1–2	Home	(Japan) Kashima Antlers
Jeonbuk Hyundai Motors	Quarter-finals	Group F	Runners-up	1–2	Away	(Japan) Kashima Antlers
Jeonbuk Hyundai Motors	Quarter-finals	Group F	Runners-up	2–1	Away	(China) Changchun Yatai
Jeonbuk Hyundai Motors	Quarter-finals	Group F	Runners-up	1–0	Home	(China) Changchun Yatai
Jeonbuk Hyundai Motors	Quarter-finals	Round of 16	3–2	3–2 (a.e.t.)	—	(Australia) Adelaide United
Jeonbuk Hyundai Motors	Quarter-finals	Quarter-finals	1–2	0–2	Home	(Saudi Arabia) Al-Shabab
Jeonbuk Hyundai Motors	Quarter-finals	Quarter-finals	1–2	1–0	Away	(Saudi Arabia) Al-Shabab
Pohang Steelers	Quarter-finals	Group H	Runners-up	0–1	Away	(Australia) Adelaide United
Pohang Steelers	Quarter-finals	Group H	Runners-up	0–0	Home	(Australia) Adelaide United
Pohang Steelers	Quarter-finals	Group H	Runners-up	2–1	Home	(Japan) Sanfrecce Hiroshima
Pohang Steelers	Quarter-finals	Group H	Runners-up	3–4	Away	(Japan) Sanfrecce Hiroshima
Pohang Steelers	Quarter-finals	Group H	Runners-up	1–0	Home	(China) Shandong Luneng
Pohang Steelers	Quarter-finals	Group H	Runners-up	2–1	Away	(China) Shandong Luneng
Pohang Steelers	Quarter-finals	Round of 16	1–0	1–0	—	(Japan) Kashima Antlers
Pohang Steelers	Quarter-finals	Quarter-finals	2–3	1–2	Away	(Iran) Zob Ahan
Pohang Steelers	Quarter-finals	Quarter-finals	2–3	1–1	Home	(Iran) Zob Ahan
Seongnam Ilhwa Chunma	Champions	Group E	Winners	2–0	Home	(Japan) Kawasaki Frontale
Seongnam Ilhwa Chunma	Champions	Group E	Winners	0–3	Away	(Japan) Kawasaki Frontale
Seongnam Ilhwa Chunma	Champions	Group E	Winners	2–0	Away	(Australia) Melbourne Victory
Seongnam Ilhwa Chunma	Champions	Group E	Winners	3–2	Home	(Australia) Melbourne Victory
Seongnam Ilhwa Chunma	Champions	Group E	Winners	3–1	Home	(China) Beijing Guoan
Seongnam Ilhwa Chunma	Champions	Group E	Winners	1–0	Away	(China) Beijing Guoan
Seongnam Ilhwa Chunma	Champions	Round of 16	3–0	3–0	—	(Japan) Gamba Osaka
Seongnam Ilhwa Chunma	Champions	Quarter-finals	4–3	4–1	Home	(South Korea) Suwon Samsung Bluewings
Seongnam Ilhwa Chunma	Champions	Quarter-finals	4–3	0–2	Away	(South Korea) Suwon Samsung Bluewings
Seongnam Ilhwa Chunma	Champions	Semi-finals	4–4 (a)	3–4	Away	(Saudi Arabia) Al-Shabab
Seongnam Ilhwa Chunma	Champions	Semi-finals	4–4 (a)	1–0	Home	(Saudi Arabia) Al-Shabab
Seongnam Ilhwa Chunma	Champions	Final	3–1	3–1	—	(Iran) Zob Ahan
Suwon Samsung Bluewings	Quarter-finals	Group G	Winners	0–0	Home	(Japan) Gamba Osaka
Suwon Samsung Bluewings	Quarter-finals	Group G	Winners	1–2	Away	(Japan) Gamba Osaka
Suwon Samsung Bluewings	Quarter-finals	Group G	Winners	2–0	Away	Singapore Armed Forces
Suwon Samsung Bluewings	Quarter-finals	Group G	Winners	6–2	Home	Singapore Armed Forces
Suwon Samsung Bluewings	Quarter-finals	Group G	Winners	2–0	Away	(China) Henan Jianye
Suwon Samsung Bluewings	Quarter-finals	Group G	Winners	2–0	Home	(China) Henan Jianye
Suwon Samsung Bluewings	Quarter-finals	Round of 16	2–0	2–0	—	(China) Beijing Guoan
Suwon Samsung Bluewings	Quarter-finals	Quarter-finals	3–4	1–4	Away	(South Korea) Seongnam Ilhwa Chunma
Suwon Samsung Bluewings	Quarter-finals	Quarter-finals	3–4	2–0	Home	(South Korea) Seongnam Ilhwa Chunma

=== FIFA Club World Cup ===
Team	Result	Round	Score	Opponent
Seongnam Ilhwa Chunma	Fourth place	Quarter-finals	4–1	(United Arab Emirates) Al-Wahda
Seongnam Ilhwa Chunma	Fourth place	Semi-finals	0–3	(Italy) Inter Milan
Seongnam Ilhwa Chunma	Fourth place	Third place match	2–4	(Brazil) Internacional

== See also ==
- Football in South Korea
