= 2010 K3 League =

Daum K3 League
- Season: 2010
- Dates: 13 March – 20 November 2010
- Champions: Gyeongju Citizen (1st title)
- Matches: 229
- Goals: 829 (3.62 per match)
- Best Player: Choi Seok-do

The 2010 K3 League was the fourth season of the amateur K3 League. The participating clubs were divided into two groups, and the winners and runners-up of both groups qualified for the championship playoffs. All clubs played an interleague match once after playing a home-and-away season in each group. Jeonju Ongoeul withdrew from the league, while Chuncheon FC and Yeonggwang FC joined the league.

== Regular season ==
=== Group A ===
Locations of the 2010 K3 League Group A teams

Pos	Team	Pld	W	D	L	GF	GA	GD	Pts	Qualification
1	Samcheok Shinwoo Electronics	25	18	4	3	48	16	+32	58	Qualification for the playoffs
2	Gyeongju Citizen	25	17	4	4	71	26	+45	55	Qualification for the playoffs
3	Cheongju Jikji	25	13	7	5	47	24	+23	46	Qualification for the FA Cup first round
4	Bucheon FC 1995	25	14	4	7	50	35	+15	46	Qualification for the FA Cup first round
5	Jeonju EM	25	14	2	9	52	34	+18	44	Qualification for the FA Cup first round
6	Yongin Citizen	25	10	5	10	47	47	0	35	
7	Asan United	25	7	1	17	20	65	−45	22	
8	Seoul FC Martyrs	25	2	2	21	31	88	−57	8	
9	Goyang Citizen	25	1	2	22	24	86	−62	5	

Source: KFA (in Korean)
Rules for classification: 1) Points; 2) Goal difference; 3) Goals scored.

=== Group B ===
Locations of the 2010 K3 League Group B teams

Pos	Team	Pld	W	D	L	GF	GA	GD	Pts	Qualification
1	Icheon Citizen	25	16	4	5	85	41	+44	52	Qualification for the playoffs
2	Yangju Citizen	25	16	3	6	59	41	+18	51	Qualification for the playoffs
3	FC Pocheon	25	14	8	3	49	26	+23	50	Qualification for the FA Cup first round
4	Namyangju United	25	12	5	8	56	32	+24	41	Qualification for the FA Cup first round
5	Seoul United	25	10	8	7	47	31	+16	38	Qualification for the FA Cup first round
6	Gwangju Gwangsan FC	25	11	3	11	42	39	+3	36	
7	Cheonan FC	25	9	2	14	45	60	−15	29	
8	Chuncheon FC	25	6	2	17	36	68	−32	20	
9	Yeonggwang FC	25	1	2	22	19	69	−50	5	

Source: KFA (in Korean)
Rules for classification: 1) Points; 2) Goal difference; 3) Goals scored.

== Championship playoffs ==
=== Bracket ===
Semi-finals
Samcheok Shinwoo Electronics (p)	0 (6)
Yangju Citizen	0 (5)
Icheon Citizen	0 (2)
Gyeongju Citizen (p)	0 (4)

Final
Samcheok Shinwoo Electronics	0	0	0
Gyeongju Citizen	0	1	1

=== Semi-finals ===
6 November 2010
14:00 KST

Samcheok Shinwoo Electronics	0–0 (a.e.t.)	Yangju Citizen
Penalties
	6–5

Samcheok Stadium, Samcheok

6 November 2010
14:00 KST

Icheon Citizen	0–0 (a.e.t.)	Gyeongju Citizen
Penalties
	2–4

Icheon City Stadium, Icheon

=== Final ===
13 November 2010
14:00 KST

Samcheok Shinwoo Electronics	0–0	Gyeongju Citizen

Samcheok Stadium, Samcheok

20 November 2010
14:00 KST

Gyeongju Citizen	1–0	Samcheok Shinwoo Electronics

Gyeongju Stadium, Gyeongju

Gyeongju Citizen won 1–0 on aggregate.

=== Final table ===
Pos	Team	Qualification
1	Gyeongju Citizen (C)	Qualification for the FA Cup second round
2	Samcheok Shinwoo Electronics	Qualification for the FA Cup first round
3	Icheon Citizen	Qualification for the FA Cup first round
4	Yangju Citizen	Qualification for the FA Cup first round

Source: RSSSF
(C) Champions

== See also ==
- 2010 in South Korean football
- 2010 Korean FA Cup
