= Lee Gwang-jae (footballer) =

South Korean footballer (born 1980)

Personal information
- Full name: Lee Gwang-jae
- Date of birth: January 1, 1980 (age 46)
- Place of birth: Seoul, South Korea
- Height: 1.85 m (6 ft 1 in)
- Position: Forward

Team information
- Current team: Goyang Hi FC
- Number: 17

Senior career*
Years	Team	Apps	(Gls)
2003	Gwangju Sangmu Bulsajo (army)	17	(5)
2004–2006	Chunnam Dragons	25	(5)
2007–2009	Pohang Steelers	36	(7)
2009–2010	Jeonbuk Hyundai Motors	20	(2)
2011	Yanbian FC	4	(1)
2011	TTM Phichit FC	3	(2)
2012	Daegu FC	8	(0)
2013–2016	Goyang Hi FC	65	(5)
- * Club domestic league appearances and goals as of 20 December 2015

Lee Gwang-jae (Korean: 이광재, born January 1, 1980) is a retired South Korean footballer.

== Club career statistics ==
As of 23 March 2011

Club performance			League		Cup		League Cup		Continental		Total	
Season	Club	League	Apps	Goals	Apps	Goals	Apps	Goals	Apps	Goals	Apps	Goals
South Korea			League		KFA Cup		League Cup		Asia		Total	
2003	Gwangju Sangmu Bulsajo	K-League	17	5	2	0	-		-		19	5
2004	Chunnam Dragons	K-League	4	0	1	0	5	0	-		10	0
2005	Chunnam Dragons	K-League	9	1	3	0	6	0	-		18	1
2006	Chunnam Dragons	K-League	12	4	3	0	10	1	-		25	5
2007	Pohang Steelers	K-League	24	7	5	2	5	0	-		34	9
2008	Pohang Steelers	K-League	8	0	2	1	1	0	4	0	15	1
2009	Pohang Steelers	K-League	4	0	1	0	0	0	0	0	5	0
2009	Jeonbuk Hyundai Motors	K-League	11	1	1	0	0	0	-		12	1
2010	Jeonbuk Hyundai Motors	K-League	9	1	2	0	3	0	2	0	16	1
China PR			League		FA Cup		CSL Cup		Asia		Total	
2011	Yanbian FC	China League One					-		-			
Total	South Korea		98	19	20	3	30	1	6	0	154	23
Total	China PR		0	0	0	0	-		-		0	0
Career total			98	19	20	3	30	1	6	0	154	23
