= 2007 K3 League =

K3 League
- Season: 2007
- Champions: Seoul United (1st title)
- Matches: 228
- Goals: 1,003 (4.4 per match)
- Best Player: Je Yong-sam
- Top goalscorer: Je Yong-sam (13 goals)

The 2007 K3 League was the first season of amateur K3 League. It consisted of two regular stages and the final playoffs. The winners of each stage and the top two clubs of the overall table qualified for the league playoffs and the 2008 Korean FA Cup.

== Regular season ==
=== First stage ===
Pos	Team	Pld	W	D	L	GF	GA	GD	Pts	Qualification
1	Hwaseong Shinwoo Electronics	9	7	0	2	16	8	+8	21	Qualification for the playoffs
2	Yongin FC	9	6	1	2	15	10	+5	19	
3	Seoul United	9	5	3	1	19	7	+12	18	
4	Daegu Korea Powertrain	9	5	0	4	15	21	−6	15	
5	Jeonju EM Korea	9	3	4	2	18	8	+10	13	
6	Cheonan FC	9	3	3	3	12	11	+1	12	
7	Changwon Doodae	9	2	4	3	15	16	−1	10	
8	Asan FC	9	2	1	6	12	18	−6	7	
9	Yangju Citizen	9	2	1	6	10	20	−10	7	
10	Eunpyeong Chunggoo Sungsim Hospital	9	1	1	7	11	24	−13	4	

Source: JoinKFA

=== Second stage ===
Pos	Team	Pld	W	D	L	GF	GA	GD	Pts	Qualification
1	Cheonan FC	9	5	4	0	18	3	+15	19	Qualification for the playoffs
2	Seoul United	9	5	4	0	23	11	+12	19	
3	Yongin FC	9	4	5	0	20	5	+15	17	
4	Jeonju EM Korea	9	4	4	1	22	12	+10	16	
5	Hwaseong Shinwoo Electronics	9	4	4	1	13	8	+5	16	
6	Daegu Korea Powertrain	9	3	4	2	22	16	+6	13	
7	Yangju Citizen	9	3	1	5	12	17	−5	10	
8	Eunpyeong Chunggoo Sungsim Hospital	9	2	1	6	8	14	−6	7	
9	Changwon Doodae	9	0	2	7	13	31	−18	2	
10	Asan FC	9	0	1	8	6	40	−34	1	

Source: JoinKFA

=== Overall table ===
Pos	Team	Pld	W	D	L	GF	GA	GD	Pts	Qualification
1	Seoul United	18	10	7	1	42	18	+24	37	Qualification for the playoffs
2	Hwaseong Shinwoo Electronics	18	11	4	3	29	16	+13	37	First stage winners
3	Yongin FC	18	10	6	2	35	15	+20	36	Qualification for the playoffs
4	Cheonan FC	18	8	7	3	30	14	+16	31	Second stage winners
5	Jeonju EM Korea	18	7	8	3	40	20	+20	29	
6	Daegu Korea Powertrain	18	8	4	6	37	37	0	28	
7	Yangju Citizen	18	5	2	11	22	37	−15	17	
8	Changwon Doodae	18	2	6	10	28	47	−19	12	
9	Eunpyeong Chunggoo Sungsim Hospital	18	3	2	13	19	38	−19	11	
10	Asan FC	18	2	2	14	18	58	−40	8	

Source: JoinKFA

== Top scorers ==
Rank	Player	Team	Goals	Apps
1	(South Korea) Je Yong-sam	Seoul United	13	18
2	(South Korea) Ko Sung-jang	Changwon Doodae	11	14
3	(South Korea) Kim Wan-soo	Daegu Korea Powertrain	9	10
3	(South Korea) Han Jung-yeon	Jeonju EM Korea	9	16
5	(South Korea) Woo Je-won	Seoul United	8	16
5	(South Korea) Bae Min-hyuk	Hwaseong Shinwoo Electronics	8	16
5	(South Korea) Ahn Jung-yeol	Yongin FC	8	16

== Championship playoffs ==
=== Bracket ===
Semi-finals
Hwaseong Shinwoo Electronics	1
Yongin FC	0
Cheonan FC	1 (1)
Seoul United (p)	1 (3)

Final
Hwaseong Shinwoo Electronics	0	0	0
Seoul United	1	2	3

=== Semi-finals ===
November 10

Hwaseong Shinwoo Electronics	1–0	Yongin FC

Baran Middle School, Hwaseong

November 10

Cheonan FC	1–1 (a.e.t.)	Seoul United
Penalties
	1–3

Cheonan Sports Complex, Cheonan

=== Final ===
November 17

Hwaseong Shinwoo Electronics	0–1	Seoul United

Bibong Artificial Turf Field, Hwaseong

November 24

Seoul United	2–0	Hwaseong Shinwoo Electronics

Seoul Olympic Stadium, Seoul

Seoul United won 3–0 on aggregate.

=== Final table ===
Pos	Team	Qualification
1	Seoul United (C)	Qualification for the FA Cup second round
2	Hwaseong Shinwoo Electronics	Qualification for the FA Cup first round
3	Yongin FC	Qualification for the FA Cup first round
4	Cheonan FC	Qualification for the FA Cup first round

Source: RSSSF
(C) Champions

== See also ==
- 2007 in South Korean football
