= Yoon Ki-won =

South Korean footballer (1987–2011)

Personal information
- Full name: Yoon Ki-won
- Date of birth: 20 May 1987
- Place of birth: Busan, South Korea
- Date of death: 6 May 2011 (aged 23)
- Place of death: Seoul, South Korea
- Height: 1.88 m (6 ft 2 in)
- Position: Goalkeeper

Youth career
- 2006–2009: Ajou University

Senior career*
Years	Team	Apps	(Gls)
2010–2011	Incheon United FC	6	(0)
- * Club domestic league appearances and goals as of 18 May 2011

Yoon Ki-won (20 May 1987 – 6 May 2011) was a South Korean football goalkeeper, who played for Incheon United FC in the K-League. Yoon committed suicide in May 2011.

== Club career ==
Yoon, a draftee from the 2010 K-League draft intake, was selected by Incheon United FC for the 2010 season. His professional debut was in an away match against Jeju United on 7 November 2010, a match in which he kept a clean sheet as well as earning a yellow card.

Yoon was the first choice keeper for Incheon at the start of the 2011 season, but by early April, a series of poor performances saw him replaced by Song Yoo-Geol. Yoon was an unused substitute for the remainder of the matches played in April. On 6 May 2011, Yoon's body was found in his car at a rest stop along an expressway near Seoul. He is presumed to have committed suicide.

== Club career statistics ==
As of 18 May 2011

Club performance			League		Cup		League Cup		Total	
Season	Club	League	Apps	Goals	Apps	Goals	Apps	Goals	Apps	Goals
South Korea			League		KFA Cup		League Cup		Total	
2010	Incheon United	K-League	1	0	0	0	0	0	1	0
2011	Incheon United	K-League	5	0	0	0	2	0	7	0
Career total			6	0	0	0	2	0	8	0
