= Candango Esporte Clube =

Candango
- Full name: Candango Esporte Clube (former Centro de Futebol Zico de Brasília Sociedade Esportiva)
- Nickname: O time do Zico!
- Founded: 1 August 1999; 26 years ago
- Ground: Mané Garrincha, Brasília, DF
- Capacity: 15,000
Home colors	Away colors

Candango Esporte Clube, the former Centro de Futebol Zico de Brasília Sociedade Esportiva / CFZ de Brasília, are a Brazilian football team from Brasília, Distrito Federal. They won the Campeonato Brasiliense in 2002, and competed in the Copa do Brasil in 2003 and in 2005.

== History ==
Centro de Futebol Zico de Brasília Sociedade Esportiva were founded on August 1, 1999 by former footballer Zico as a branch of Rio de Janeiro state club Centro de Futebol Zico Sociedade Esportiva. CFZ de Brasília professionalized their football section on July 15, 2001. The club won the Campeonato Brasiliense in 2002. That season's top goalscorer was CFZ de Brasília's Tiano, with 21 goals.

In April 2025, after the club is acquired by the former footballer Schwenck, changed their name to Candango EC.

=== Copa do Brasil ===
CFZ de Brasília competed in the Copa do Brasil in 2003, when they were eliminated in the first stage by Fortaleza, and in 2005, when they were eliminated in the first stage by Coritiba.

== Honours ==
=== State ===
- Campeonato Brasiliense
  - Winners (1): 2002
- Campeonato Brasiliense Second Division
  - Winners (1): 2010

=== Women's Football ===
- Campeonato Brasiliense de Futebol Feminino
  - Winners (4): 2000, 2001, 2002, 2003

== Current squad ==
As of December 2010, according to combined sources on the official website.

Note: Flags indicate national team as defined under FIFA eligibility rules; some limited exceptions apply. Players may hold more than one non-FIFA nationality.

No.	Pos.	Nation	Player
—	GK	BRA	Marcone
—	GK	BRA	Carlos Rodolfo
—	DF	BRA	Carlos André
—	DF	BRA	Jardin
—	DF	BRA	Jean
—	DF	BRA	Rafael (on loan from Coritiba)
—	DF	BRA	Dudu
—	DF	BRA	Tarcísio
—	DF	BRA	Felipinho
—	DF	BRA	João Paulo
—	MF	BRA	Perivaldo

No.	Pos.	Nation	Player
—	MF	BRA	Paraíba
—	MF	BRA	André Tobias
—	MF	BRA	PC
—	MF	BRA	Brenio
—	MF	BRA	Lucas
—	MF	BRA	Carlyle (on loan from Flamengo)
—	MF	BRA	Janderson
—	FW	BRA	Jonhes
—	FW	BRA	Bruno
—	FW	BRA	André
—	FW	BRA	Lucas Dantas

== Youth squad ==
=== Professional players able to play in the youth team ===
Note: Flags indicate national team as defined under FIFA eligibility rules; some limited exceptions apply. Players may hold more than one non-FIFA nationality.

No.	Pos.	Nation	Player
—	DF	BRA	Rafael (on loan from Coritiba)
—	DF	BRA	Dudu
—	DF	BRA	Tarcísio
—	DF	BRA	João Paulo

No.	Pos.	Nation	Player
—	MF	BRA	Lucas
—	MF	BRA	Carlyle (on loan from Flamengo)
—	MF	BRA	Janderson
—	FW	BRA	André

=== Youth players with first team experience ===
Note: Flags indicate national team as defined under FIFA eligibility rules; some limited exceptions apply. Players may hold more than one non-FIFA nationality.

No.	Pos.	Nation	Player

== Out on loan ==
Note: Flags indicate national team as defined under FIFA eligibility rules; some limited exceptions apply. Players may hold more than one non-FIFA nationality.

No.	Pos.	Nation	Player
—	MF	BRA	Ronaell (loan to Internacional)

== First-team staff ==
As of December 28, 2010

Position	Name	Nationality
Coach	Toninho Cajurú	Brazilian

== Noted players ==
This is a list of noted footballers who have played for CFZ de Brasília whether or not they have a Wikipedia article. Players who have made significant/notable contribution to the club are included.

=== List of players ===
As of December 28, 2010.

Positions key
GK	Goalkeeper	CB	Centre back	FB	Full back
DM	Defensive midfielder	CM	Central midfielder	AM	Attacking midfielder
W	Winger	FW	Forward	ST	Striker

Statistics correct as of match played December 28, 2010

Player name	Position	CFZ de Brasília career	Appearances	Goals	Birth date	Birth place	Nationality
Carlyle	AM	2009–2010	?	?	September 26, 1991	Goiânia	Brazil
Tiano	AM	2002	?	?	December 20, 1977	Rio de Janeiro	Brazil

== Noted coaches ==
The following is a list of Centro de Futebol Zico de Brasília Sociedade Esportiva coaches.

Name	Nationality	Periods	Notes
Reinaldo Gueldini	Brazil	2002	

== Stadiums ==
=== Mané Garrincha Stadium ===
CFZ de Brasília play their home games at Mané Garrincha. The stadium has a maximum capacity of 15,000 people.

== Presidents ==
- Eduardo Carlos dos Santos (?)

== See also ==
- Centro de Futebol Zico Sociedade Esportiva
