= Choi Jong-bum =

South Korean footballer (born 1978)

Choi Jong-Bum
Personal information
- Full name: Choi Jong-Bum
- Date of birth: 27 March 1978 (age 48)
- Place of birth: South Korea
- Height: 1.76 m (5 ft 9 in)
- Position: Midfielder

Youth career
- Yeungnam University

Senior career*
Years	Team	Apps	(Gls)
2001–2008	Pohang Steelers	51	(1)
2005–2006	→ Gwangju Sangmu (army)	33	(2)
2009	Daegu FC	2	(0)
2010	Daejeon KHNP	10	(0)

International career
2000	South Korea U-23		
2003	South Korea	2	(0)

Managerial career
- 2011–: Sangju Sangmu Phoenix (assistant)
- * Club domestic league appearances and goals as of 20 June 2009

Choi Jong-Bum (Korean: 최종범; born 27 March 1978) is a South Korean former football midfielder.

Choi made his South Korea national football team debut on 29 September 2003 in a match against Nepal at Asian Cup qualification.
