= Yoo Byung-soo =

South Korean footballer (born 1988)

Yoo Byung-Soo 유병수
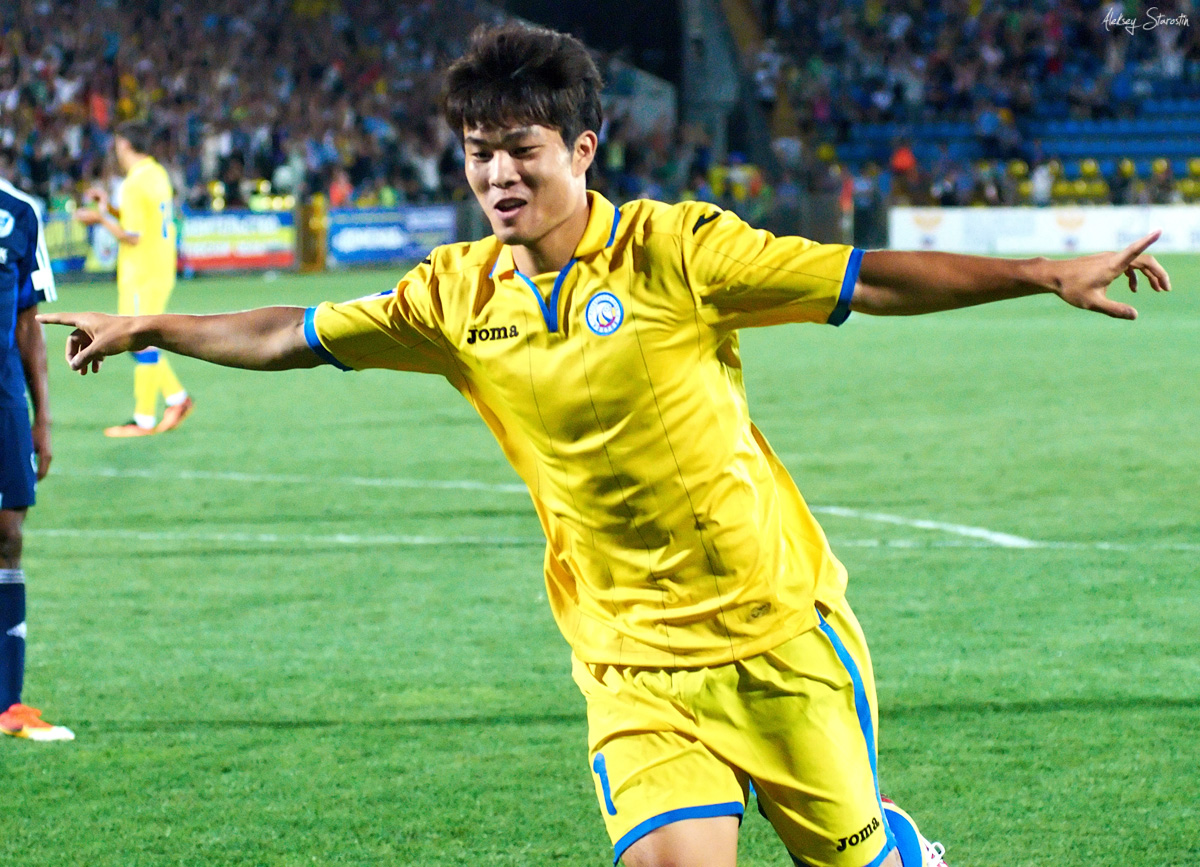
- Yoo in 2013

Personal information
- Date of birth: 26 March 1988 (age 38)
- Place of birth: Daegu, South Korea
- Height: 1.83 m (6 ft 0 in)
- Position: Striker

Team information
- Current team: North Bangkok University
- Number: 7

Youth career
- 2007–2008: Hongik University

Senior career*
Years	Team	Apps	(Gls)
2009–2011	Incheon United	67	(37)
2011–2013	Al-Hilal	44	(16)
2013–2016	Rostov	28	(3)
2017–2018	Gimpo Citizen	8	(8)
2019	Hwaseong	19	(7)
2020	MOF Customs United	4	(2)
2020–2021	Ayutthaya United	29	(20)
2021–2023	Chonburi	63	(21)
2023–2024	Chiangmai	22	(11)
2024–2025	Hwaseong	15	(6)
2026	Navy	11	(6)
2026–	North Bangkok University	0	(0)

International career
2010–2011	South Korea	4	(0)
- * Club domestic league appearances and goals as of 7 July 2026

- Yoo Byung-soo
- Hangul: 유병수
- Hanja: 兪炳守
- RR: Yu Byeongsu
- MR: Yu Pyŏngsu

Yoo Byung-Soo (Korean: 유병수; born 26 March 1988) is a South Korean professional footballer who plays as a striker for Thai League 3 club North Bangkok University.

He has been nicknamed the "Ronaldo of Wolmido", because of his spinless free-kick that resembles that of Cristiano Ronaldo's. Wolmido is a small park in Incheon city, where he started his professional career.

== Club career ==
=== Youth career ===
Yoo entered Dunchun Middle School, scoring at least one goal in nearly every match he played in. Then he entered Unnam High School, winning the top scorer award in a couple of national competitions. After graduating from high school, he decided to enter Hong-Ik University, winning the top assists award in National University Competition. Thus having grabbed the attention of many scouts, he joined K-League side Incheon United.

=== Incheon United ===
In the pre-season, Incheon sold its franchise star striker Bang Seung-Hwan to Jeju United. This transfer worried many Incheon fans as they had already sold another striker Dženan Radončić to Seongnam Ilhwa. However, Incheon's newly appointed manager Ilija Petković said that Yoo Byung-Soo could be the replacement, and he can develop into a new franchise star for Incheon.

On 3 March 2009, Yoo scored in his senior debut match against Busan I'Park. In his debut season in K-League, he was widely regarded as one of the best candidates for the Rookie of the Season award but eventually Gangwon FC's forward Kim Young-Hoo grabbed the award. In November 2009, he was linked with Premier League side Bolton Wanderers.

In the 2010 K-League season, he scored 22 goals in 28 appearances, and was named 2010 K-League top scorer, Yoo signed a contract extension with Incheon United, running until 2013.

=== Al Hilal ===
In July 2011, Yoo signed a new contract with the Asian club of the century, Al Hilal in Saudi Arabia, running until 2014. He scored a total of 16 goals while playing 44 league matches in two seasons for the Riyadh-based team.

=== Rostov ===
On 22 June 2013, Al Hilal announced that Yoo had agreed on a transfer to a Russian Premier League side FC Rostov.

=== Return to Korea ===
In 2017, Yoo joined Gimpo Citizen FC for public service work. During August 2018, Yoo spent time on trial with A-League side Wellington Phoenix; scoring in a 5–0 friendly victory over Napier City Rovers on 24 August.

In 2019, Yoo signed with K3 League team Hwaseong.

Yoo played in Thailand from 2020 to 2024.

In 2024, Yoo returned to Hwaseong, but shortly after he was diagnosed with blood cancer and did not play for a year undergoing therapy. He announced that he was cancer-free in August 2025 and returned to the field in October.

== International career ==
On 3 June 2009, Yoo played his first senior game for the South Korea national team against Oman, as a second-half substitute.

He was selected to take part in the Asian Cup 2011 in Qatar.

== Career statistics ==
As of 22 January 2016

Appearances and goals by club, season and competition
Club	Season	League			National cup (Note: Includes Korean FA Cup, Saudi Crown Prince Cup, Russian Cup.)		League cup (Note: Includes K-League Cup, Saudi Champions Cup.)		Continental		Other		Total	
Club	Season	Division	Apps	Goals	Apps	Goals	Apps	Goals	Apps	Goals	Apps	Goals	Apps	Goals
Incheon United	2009	K-League	27	12	1	0	7	2	–		–		35	14
Incheon United	2010	K-League	28	22	3	3	3	0	–		–		34	25
Incheon United	2011	K-League	12	3	0	0	1	1	–		–		13	4
Incheon United	Total		67	37	4	3	11	3	0	0	0	0	82	43
Al-Hilal	2011–12	Saudi Professional League	20	6	4	5	2	0	9	5	1	2	36	18
Al-Hilal	2012–13	Saudi Professional League	24	10	3	1	2	0	8	0	0	0	38	11
Al-Hilal	Total		44	16	7	6	4	0	17	5	1	2	73	29
Rostov	2013–14	Russian Premier League	17	2	2	0	–		–		–		19	2
Rostov	2014–15	Russian Premier League	4	0	0	0	–		1	0	–		5	0
Rostov	2015–16	Russian Premier League	7	1	0	0	–		0	0	–		7	1
Rostov	Total		28	3	2	0	0	0	1	0	0	0	31	3
Career total			139	56	13	9	15	3	18	5	1	2	186	75

== Honours ==
Al-Hilal

- Crown Prince Cup: 2011–12, 2012–13

Rostov

- Russian Cup: 2013–14
