= Song Yoo-geol =

South Korean footballer (born 1985)

Song Yoo-Geol 송유걸
Personal information
- Full name: Song Yoo-Geol
- Date of birth: February 16, 1985 (age 41)
- Place of birth: Busan, South Korea
- Height: 1.87 m (6 ft 2 in)
- Position: Goalkeeper

Youth career
- Kyunghee University

Senior career*
Years	Team	Apps	(Gls)
2006–2007	Chunnam Dragons	0	(0)
2007–2011	Incheon United	37	(0)
2012–2014	Gangwon FC	25	(0)
2013–2014	→ Ansan Police (army)	11	(0)
2015	Ulsan Hyundai	1	(0)
2016–2017	Gangwon FC	16	(0)
2018	Busan IPark	2	(0)
2019	Gangneung Citizen		

International career^{‡}
2007–2008	South Korea U-23	5	(0)
- * Club domestic league appearances and goals as of 2 July 2022 ‡ National team caps and goals as of 23 October 2007

Song Yoo-Geol (Korea:송유걸, born February 16, 1985) is a South Korean former football player who plays as a goalkeeper and currently goalkeeper manager of Seongnam FC.

His first club is Chunnam Dragons, Song played only one game at Hauzen Cup in 2006 and moved to league rivals Incheon United in July 2007.

On 28 November 2011, he joined Gangwon FC in a swap deal involving goalkeeper Yoo Hyun.

Song also participated in South Korea U-23 as of Olympic football team.

== Club career statistics ==
Club performance			League		Cup		League Cup		Continental		Total	
Season	Club	League	Apps	Goals	Apps	Goals	Apps	Goals	Apps	Goals	Apps	Goals
South Korea			League		KFA Cup		League Cup		Asia		Total	
2006	Chunnam Dragons	K-League	0	0	0	0	1	0	-		1	0
2007	Chunnam Dragons	K-League	0	0	0	0	0	0	1	0	1	0
2007	Incheon United	K-League	0	0	0	0	0	0	-		0	0
2008	Incheon United	K-League	4	0	1	0	8	0	-		13	0
2009	Incheon United	K-League	7	0	0	0	3	0	-		10	0
2010	Incheon United	K-League	15	0	2	0	2	0	-		19	0
2011	Incheon United	K-League	11	0	2	0	2	0	-		15	0
2012	Gangwon FC	K-League							-			
Career total			37	0	5	0	16	0	1	0	59	0
