= Samcheok Shinwoo Electronics FC =

2006–2011 South Korean football club

Samcheok Shinwoo Electronics FC 삼척 신우전자 FC
- Full name: Samcheok Shinwoo Electronics Football Club 삼척 신우전자 축구단
- Founded: 2006; 20 years ago
- Dissolved: 2011; 15 years ago
- Ground: Samcheok Stadium
- Capacity: 15,000
- Owner: (South Korea) Shinwoo Electronics
- Chairman: (South Korea) Kim Dae-soo (mayor) (South Korea) Lee Gi-won
- Manager: (South Korea) Jung Tae-young
- League: (South Korea) K3 League
- 2010 Season: 2nd
Home colours	Away colours

Samcheok Shinwoo Electronics Football Club (Korean: 삼척 신우전자 축구단) was a South Korean football club based in the city of Samcheok. It was established in Hwaseong in 2006 as Hwaseong Shinwoo Electronics FC. It moved its home to Samcheok in 2008, changing its name to Samcheok Shinwoo Electronics FC. It was a member of the Challengers League, an amateur league and the fourth tier of league football in South Korea. The club withdrew from the league at the end of the 2010 season.

== Club name history ==
- Hwaseong Shinwoo Electronics Butis FC (2007-2008)
- Samcheok Shinwoo Electronics FC (2009-2010)

== Honours ==
K3 League

- Runner-up: (2) 2007, 2008

== Year-by-year ==
Year	Regular Season	FA Cup
2007	2nd, K3	N/A
2008	2nd, K3	Round 1
2009	12th, K3	Round 1
2010	2nd, K3	Do Not Quilify
