= 2007 Korean League Cup =

2007 Samsung Hauzen Cup
Tournament details
- Country: South Korea
- Dates: 14 March – 27 June 2007
- Teams: 14

Final positions
- Champions: Ulsan Hyundai Horang-i (4th title)
- Runners-up: FC Seoul

Tournament statistics
- Matches played: 65
- Goals scored: 137 (2.11 per match)
- Top goal scorer: Luizinho (7 goals)

The 2007 Korean League Cup, also known as the 2007 Samsung Hauzen Cup, was the 20th competition of the Korean League Cup.

== Group stage ==
=== Group A ===
Pos	Team	Pld	W	D	L	GF	GA	GD	Pts
1	Ulsan Hyundai Horang-i	10	5	4	1	10	4	+6	19
2	Incheon United	10	6	1	3	20	15	+5	19
3	Daegu FC	10	4	1	5	13	16	−3	13
4	Jeonbuk Hyundai Motors	10	3	3	4	9	10	−1	12
5	Pohang Steelers	10	2	5	3	8	10	−2	11
6	Jeju United	10	2	2	6	4	9	−5	8

Source: RSSSF

=== Group B ===
Pos	Team	Pld	W	D	L	GF	GA	GD	Pts
1	FC Seoul	10	6	3	1	17	6	+11	21
2	Suwon Samsung Bluewings	10	5	2	3	20	12	+8	17
3	Gwangju Sangmu Bulsajo	10	3	3	4	6	12	−6	12
4	Busan IPark	10	2	5	3	7	8	−1	11
5	Daejeon Citizen	10	2	5	3	6	10	−4	11
6	Gyeongnam FC	10	1	4	5	3	11	−8	7

Source: RSSSF

== Knockout stage ==
Quarter-finals
L	Seongnam Ilhwa Chunma	1
B2	Suwon Samsung Bluewings (a.e.t.)	4
FA	Jeonnam Dragons	1
A2	Incheon United	2

Semi-finals
A1	Ulsan Hyundai Horang-i	1
QF	Suwon Samsung Bluewings	0
B1	FC Seoul (p)	1 (4)
QF	Incheon United	1 (3)

Final
SF	Ulsan Hyundai Horang-i	2
SF	FC Seoul	1

== Top scorers ==
Rank	Player	Club	Goals	Apps
1	(Brazil) Luizinho	Daegu FC	7	9
2	(South Korea) Ahn Jung-hwan	Suwon Samsung Bluewings	5	10
2	(Montenegro) Dejan Damjanović	Incheon United	5	10
2	(Brazil) Denilson	Daejeon Citizen	5	10
2	(South Korea) Kim Sang-rok	Incheon United	5	11
6	(Brazil) Nadson	Suwon Samsung Bluewings	4	7
6	(South Korea) Kim Eun-jung	FC Seoul	4	7
6	(South Korea) Yang Dong-hyun	Ulsan Hyundai Horang-i	4	9
6	(South Korea) Park Jae-hyun	Incheon United	4	9
6	(South Korea) Bang Seung-hwan	Incheon United	4	9
6	(Croatia) Mato Neretljak	Suwon Samsung Bluewings	4	11

== Awards ==
Award	Player	Team	Points
Top goalscorer	(Brazil) Luizinho	Daegu FC	7 goals
Top assist provider	(South Korea) Lee Chung-yong	FC Seoul	5 assists

== See also ==
- 2007 in South Korean football
- 2007 K League
- 2007 Korean FA Cup
