= Jang Won-seok =

South Korean footballer

Jang Won-Seok
Personal information
- Full name: Jang Won-Seok
- Date of birth: April 16, 1986 (age 40)
- Place of birth: Seoul, South Korea
- Height: 1.79 m (5 ft 10 1/2 in)
- Position: Centre back

Team information
- Current team: Daejeon Citizen
- Number: 3

Youth career
- Honam University

Senior career*
Years	Team	Apps	(Gls)
2009–2012	Incheon United	46	(3)
2012–2016	Jeju United	19	(0)
2014	→ Daejeon Citizen (loan)	31	(1)
2015–2016	→ FC Pocheon (loan)		
2017–	Daejeon Citizen	22	(0)
- * Club domestic league appearances and goals as of 1 January 2019

Jang Won-Seok (Korean: 장원석; born April 16, 1986) is a South Korean football player who plays for K League 2 side Daejeon Citizen.
