= 2007 K League =

Samsung Hauzen K League
- Season: 2007
- Dates: Regular season: 3 March – 14 October 2007; Championship: 20 October – 11 November 2007
- Champions: Pohang Steelers (4th title)
- Champions League: Pohang Steelers; Jeonnam Dragons
- Matches: 182
- Goals: 424 (2.33 per match)
- Best Player: André Luiz Tavares
- Top goalscorer: Cabore (17 goals)

The 2007 K League was the 25th season of the K League. The format of the league was changed from two stages to single league since this season. Each team played 26 matches against every other teams under the home and away system. After the regular league was finished, the top six clubs qualified for the championship playoffs to determine champions.

It took a break after the Round 13 on 23 June due to the 2007 AFC Asian Cup, and resumed with the Round 14 on 8 August.

== Teams ==
=== Foreign players ===
Club	Player 1	Player 2	Player 3	Former player(s)
Busan IPark	(Brazil) Ciel	(Brazil) Luciano Tanque	(Croatia) Frane Čačić	(Brazil) Luiz Fernando (Brazil) William
Jeonnam Dragons	(Brazil) Leandrão	(Brazil) Sandro Hiroshi	(Brazil) Victor Simões	(Brazil) Sandro
Daegu FC	(Brazil) Eninho	(Brazil) Luizinho	(Brazil) Selmir	
Daejeon Citizen	(Brazil) Adriano Chuva	(Brazil) Cristiano Pereira	(Brazil) Denílson	(Argentina) Fabián Caballero (Brazil) Fernandinho
FC Seoul	(Brazil) Adilson	(Brazil) Dudu	(Portugal) Ricardo Nascimento	
Gwangju Sangmu Bulsajo				
Gyeongnam FC	(Brazil) Cabore	(Brazil) Rogério Pinheiro	(Brazil) Popó	
Incheon United	(Montenegro) Dejan Damjanović	(Serbia) Dragan Mladenović	(Serbia) Željko Kalajdžić	(Montenegro) Dženan Radončić
Jeju United	(Brazil) Irineu	(Brazil) Ricardinho		(Bosnia and Herzegovina) Nikola Vasiljević (Serbia) Ivan Perić
Jeonbuk Hyundai Motors	(Croatia) Antonio Franja	(Brazil) Zé Carlos	(North Macedonia) Stevica Ristić	
Pohang Steelers	(Brazil) Jonhes	(Brazil) Schwenck	(Brazil) André Luiz Tavares	(Argentina) Carlos Frontini (Brazil) Maurício
Seongnam Ilhwa Chunma	(Brazil) Itamar	(Brazil) Mota		(Romania) Adrian Neaga
Suwon Samsung Bluewings	(Brazil) Edu	(Brazil) Nádson	(Croatia) Mato Neretljak	(Brazil) Elpídio Silva
Ulsan Hyundai	(Brazil) Almir	(Brazil) Leandro Machado	(Chile) José Luis Villanueva	

== Regular season ==
=== League table ===
The top six teams qualified for the championship playoffs.

Pos	Team	Pld	W	D	L	GF	GA	GD	Pts	Qualification
1	Seongnam Ilhwa Chunma	26	16	7	3	43	18	+25	55	Qualification for the playoffs final
2	Suwon Samsung Bluewings	26	15	6	5	36	24	+12	51	Qualification for the playoffs semi-final
3	Ulsan Hyundai Horang-i	26	12	9	5	34	22	+12	45	Qualification for the playoffs first round
4	Gyeongnam FC	26	13	4	9	41	31	+10	43	Qualification for the playoffs first round
5	Pohang Steelers	26	12	5	9	27	31	−4	41	Qualification for the playoffs first round
6	Daejeon Citizen	26	10	7	9	34	27	+7	37	Qualification for the playoffs first round
7	FC Seoul	26	8	13	5	23	16	+7	37	
8	Jeonbuk Hyundai Motors	26	9	9	8	36	32	+4	36	
9	Incheon United	26	8	9	9	30	32	−2	33	
10	Jeonnam Dragons	26	7	9	10	24	27	−3	30	Qualification for the Champions League (Note: Qualified as champions of the FA Cup.)
11	Jeju United	26	8	6	12	27	35	−8	30	
12	Daegu FC	26	6	6	14	35	46	−11	24	
13	Busan IPark	26	4	8	14	20	39	−19	20	
14	Gwangju Sangmu Bulsajo	26	2	6	18	14	44	−30	12	

Source: RSSSF

=== Results ===
Home \ Away	BIP	JND	DGU	DJC	SEO	GWJ	GNM	ICU	JJU	JHM	PHS	SIC	SSB	USH
Busan IPark	—	1–3	1–4	1–0	0–0	2–1	1–4	0–0	0–1	0–2	1–2	1–3	1–2	0–1
Jeonnam Dragons	0–0	—	3–2	1–2	0–1	2–0	2–1	0–0	1–0	1–0	2–1	0–2	0–0	0–1
Daegu FC	1–1	2–2	—	1–1	1–0	2–1	1–3	1–2	3–0	1–1	2–2	1–2	1–2	3–1
Daejeon Citizen	2–2	1–1	4–1	—	0–0	2–0	0–0	0–1	1–0	2–0	3–0	1–2	1–0	1–3
FC Seoul	4–0	1–0	2–0	2–1	—	0–0	0–3	2–1	1–0	1–1	3–0	0–0	0–1	0–0
Gwangju Sangmu	0–3	0–0	2–1	1–0	0–0	—	0–4	1–1	0–2	0–2	0–1	0–1	1–3	1–2
Gyeongnam FC	2–0	2–0	1–0	1–2	1–0	1–0	—	0–0	3–1	1–2	1–3	0–2	0–0	0–4
Incheon United	2–2	2–1	2–1	3–2	2–2	3–2	1–2	—	1–1	1–3	0–1	0–2	2–3	1–0
Jeju United	1–0	2–1	2–0	2–3	2–2	1–1	1–1	0–2	—	2–2	2–0	1–2	0–1	2–1
Jeonbuk Hyundai Motors	1–1	1–1	4–1	0–2	1–1	2–1	2–3	0–0	2–1	—	1–2	0–2	1–1	0–0
Pohang Steelers	0–1	1–0	1–3	1–1	0–0	2–1	2–1	3–2	0–1	1–3	—	2–1	0–0	1–0
Seongnam Ilhwa Chunma	2–1	1–1	3–0	0–0	0–0	3–1	1–2	1–1	2–0	2–1	1–1	—	3–1	1–1
Suwon Samsung Bluewings	1–0	1–0	1–1	2–1	2–1	0–0	5–3	1–0	3–0	2–3	1–0	2–1	—	1–2
Ulsan Hyundai Horang-i	0–0	2–2	2–1	2–1	0–0	4–0	1–1	1–0	2–2	2–1	0–0	0–3	2–0	—

Source: RSSSF
Legend: Blue = home team win; Yellow = draw; Red = away team win.

== Championship playoffs ==
=== Bracket ===
First round
3	Ulsan Hyundai Horang-i	2
6	Daejeon Citizen	0
4	Gyeongnam FC	1 (3)
5	Pohang Steelers (p)	1 (4)

Second round
Ulsan Hyundai Horang-i	1
Pohang Steelers	2

Semifinal
2	Suwon Samsung Bluewings	0
Pohang Steelers	1

Final
1	Seongnam Ilhwa Chunma	1	0	1
Pohang Steelers	3	1	4

=== Final table ===
Pos	Team	Qualification
1	Pohang Steelers (C)	Qualification for the Champions League
2	Seongnam Ilhwa Chunma	
3	Suwon Samsung Bluewings	
4	Ulsan Hyundai Horang-i	
5	Gyeongnam FC	
6	Daejeon Citizen	

Source: RSSSF
(C) Champions

== Top scorers ==
This list includes goals of the championship playoffs. The official top goalscorer was decided with records of only regular season, and Cabore won the award with 17 goals.

Pos	Player	Team	Goals	Apps
1	(Brazil) Cabore	Gyeongnam FC	18	26
2	(Brazil) Denilson	Daejeon Citizen	14	24
2	(Montenegro) Dejan Damjanović	Incheon United	14	26
4	(North Macedonia) Stevica Ristić	Jeonbuk Hyundai Motors	13	25
5	(Brazil) Luizinho	Daegu FC	11	23
6	(Brazil) Mota	Seongnam Ilhwa Chunma	9	21
7	(Brazil) Adriano Chuva	Daejeon Citizen	8	14
7	(South Korea) Lee Keun-ho	Daegu FC	8	20
7	(Brazil) Sandro Hiroshi	Jeonnam Dragons	8	26
7	(South Korea) Woo Sung-yong	Ulsan Hyundai Horang-i	8	26

== Awards ==
=== Main awards ===
The K League Players' Player of the Year was published by Korean edition of FourFourTwo in summer, and was not an official award of the K League, but 100 players participated in the selection process.

Award	Winner	Club
Most Valuable Player	(Brazil) André Luiz Tavares	Pohang Steelers
Top goalscorer	(Brazil) Cabore	Gyeongnam FC
Top assist provider	(Brazil) André Luiz Tavares	Pohang Steelers
Rookie of the Year	(South Korea) Ha Tae-goon	Suwon Samsung Bluewings
Manager of the Year	(Brazil) Sérgio Farias	Pohang Steelers
Players' Player of the Year	(South Korea) Kim Do-heon	Seongnam Ilhwa Chunma

=== Best XI ===
Position	Winner	Club
Goalkeeper	(South Korea) Kim Byung-ji	FC Seoul
Defenders	(Brazil) Adilson	FC Seoul
Defenders	(Croatia) Mato Neretljak	Suwon Samsung Bluewings
Defenders	(South Korea) Hwang Jae-won	Pohang Steelers
Defenders	(South Korea) Jang Hak-young	Seongnam Ilhwa Chunma
Midfielders	(Brazil) André Luiz Tavares	Pohang Steelers
Midfielders	(South Korea) Lee Kwan-woo	Suwon Samsung Bluewings
Midfielders	(South Korea) Kim Gi-dong	Pohang Steelers
Midfielders	(South Korea) Kim Do-heon	Seongnam Ilhwa Chunma
Forwards	(South Korea) Lee Keun-ho	Daegu FC
Forwards	(Brazil) Cabore	Gyeongnam FC

== Attendance ==
At the end of the 2007 season, the K League attracted 2,073,808 fans and an average of 11,786 fans per game. That puts the K League at 15th in the world for average attendances for domestic premier leagues for association football.

Team	Average	Minimum	Maximum	Total
Suwon Samsung Bluewings	25,194	16,213	41,819	327,526
FC Seoul	21,513	10,574	55,397	279,670
Incheon United	16,671	6,217	25,686	216,728
Daegu FC	15,007	2,085	44,215	180,090
Daejon Citizen	14,659	5,423	28,074	175,914
Jeonbuk Hyundai Motors	11,312	4,328	29,112	135,754
Gwangju Sangmu	8,861	2,678	28,637	115,196
Ulsan Hyundai Horang-i	8,706	3,628	14,763	113,184
Gyeongnam FC	8,625	3,051	23,192	103,503
Jeonnam Dragons	8,565	3,859	13,800	102,780
Seongnam Ilhwa Chunma	7,677	4,236	10,508	99,794
Jeju United	6,636	1,231	20,499	79,635
Pohang Steelers	6,572	1,735	12,596	78,873
Busan IPark	5,012	1,505	11,075	65,161

== See also ==
- 2007 in South Korean football
- 2007 K League Championship
- 2007 Korean League Cup
- 2007 Korean FA Cup
