= Daegu KAPEC FC =

2004–2008 South Korean football club

Daegu Korea Powertrain FC 대구 한국파워트레인 FC
- Full name: Daegu Korea Powertrain Football Club 대구 한국파워트레인 축구단
- Short name: KAPEC
- Founded: 2004
- Dissolved: 2008
- Ground: Daegu Stadium; Assistant Ground
- Owner: (South Korea) Korea Powertrain
- Chairman: (South Korea) Ju In-sik
- Manager: (South Korea) Sin Gi-dong
- League: (South Korea) K3 League
- 2007 Season: 6th
Home colours	Away colours

Daegu Korea Powertrain Football Club (Korean: 대구 한국파워트레인 축구단) was a South Korean association football club based in the city of Daegu. It was a member of the K3 League in 2007, but withdrew from the league after being unable to find a suitable home venue for the 2008 season.

== Club records ==
Season	K3 League											KFA Cup	Top scorer (League goals)	Manager
Season	Stage	Teams	P	W	D	L	GF	GA	GD	Pts	Position	KFA Cup	Top scorer (League goals)	Manager
2007	First	10	9	5	0	4	15	21	−6	15	4th	Did not qualify	(South Korea) Kim Wan-soo (9)	(South Korea) Shin Ki-dong
2007	Second	10	9	3	4	2	22	16	+6	13	6th	Did not qualify	(South Korea) Kim Wan-soo (9)	(South Korea) Shin Ki-dong
2007	Overall	10	18	8	4	6	37	37	0	28	6th	Did not qualify	(South Korea) Kim Wan-soo (9)	(South Korea) Shin Ki-dong
