= Fábio Bahia =

Brazilian footballer (born 1983)

Personal information
- Full name: Fábio Júnior Nascimento Santana
- Date of birth: 2 November 1983 (age 43)
- Place of birth: Senhor do Bonfim, Brazil
- Height: 1.70 m (5 ft 7 in)
- Position: Defensive midfielder

Team information
- Current team: Jacuipense

Youth career
- 2002: CRAC-GO

Senior career*
Years	Team	Apps	(Gls)
2002–2005	Vila Nova-GO	20	(0)
2005–2010	Goiás	38	(2)
2010	→ Bahia (loan)	30	(2)
2011	Incheon United	29	(2)
2012	Guarani	37	(0)
2013	Sport	28	(0)
2014	Mirassol	18	(1)
2014–2016	ABC	78	(0)
2016–2021	São Bento	206	(8)
2022–	Jacuipense	46	(2)
- * Club domestic league appearances and goals as of 23 July 2023

Fábio Júnior Nascimento Santana (born 2 November 1983), or simply Fábio Bahia, is a Brazilian defensive midfielder who plays for Jacuipense.

== Honours ==
- Goiás State League: 2005, 2006

== Contract ==
- Goiás: 1 January 2007 to 31 December 2011
