= Schwenck =

Brazilian footballer (born 1979)

Personal information
- Full name: Cléber Schwenck Tiene
- Date of birth: 8 February 1979 (age 47)
- Place of birth: Nova Iguaçu, Rio de Janeiro, Brazil
- Height: 1.80 m (5 ft 11 in)
- Position: Striker

Youth career
- 1993–1997: Nova Iguaçu

Senior career*
Years	Team	Apps	(Gls)
1998	Nova Iguaçu		
1999	Juventus-SP		
1999–2001	CRB		
2001–2002	CFZ de Brasília		
2002	Al-Riyadh		
2003	America-RJ		
2003	Bragantino		
2004	Cruzeiro		
2004	Botafogo	5	(1)
2005	Vegalta Sendai	38	(13)
2006	Figueirense	24	(10)
2007	Beitar Jerusalem	14	(2)
2007	Pohang Steelers	17	(4)
2008	Goiás	7	(0)
2008	Juventude		(2)
2009–2010	Nova Iguaçu	0	(0)
2009	→ Figueirense (loan)	24	(10)
2010	→ Vitória (loan)	35	(9)
2011	Criciúma	48	(17)
2012	Itumbiara	15	(8)
2012	Guarani	25	(8)
2013	CRB	4	(0)
2013	ABC	7	(0)
2014	Marcílio Dias	13	(7)
2014	Joinville	8	(0)
2015	Marcílio Dias	13	(6)
2015	Inter de Lages	5	(1)
2016	Nova Iguaçu	22	(11)
2017	Almirante Barroso	12	(4)
2017	Anápolis	8	(4)
2017	Marcílio Dias	10	(5)
2018	União Beltrão	5	(1)
2018	Marcílio Dias		
- * Club domestic league appearances and goals

Cléber Schwenck Tiene (born 8 February 1979), or simply Schwenck, is a Brazilian former football player who played as a striker.

== Career ==
He joined Pohang Steelers after a very brief spell with Beitar Jerusalem in 2007. In 2008, he moved to Goiás in Brazil.

== Club statistics ==
Club performance			League		Cup		Total	
Season	Club	League	Apps	Goals	Apps	Goals	Apps	Goals
Japan			League		Emperor's Cup		Total	
2005	Vegalta Sendai	J2 League	38	13	1	1	39	14
Country	Japan		38	13	1	1	39	14
Total			38	13	1	1	39	14

== Honours ==
- Federal District League: 2002
- Minas Gerais State League: 2004
- Santa Catarina State League: 2006
- K-League: 2007
- Bahia State League: 2010
- Brazilian Série B: 2014
- Campeonato Carioca Série B: 2016
