= Diego Giaretta =

Brazilian footballer (born 1983)

Personal information
- Full name: Diego da Silva Giaretta
- Date of birth: November 27, 1983 (age 42)
- Place of birth: Cascavel, Brazil
- Height: 1.84 m (6 ft 0 in)
- Positions: Centre-back; left-back

Youth career
- Matsubara
- Cascavel

Senior career*
Years	Team	Apps	(Gls)
2001	Cascavel		
2003	Marcílio Dias		
2004	Grêmio		
2005–2006	Tenerife		
2006	Brusque		
2006	Metropolitano		
2007	Figueirense		
2008–2012	Grêmio Prudente	94	(5)
2009	→ Botafogo (loan)	12	(0)
2011	→ Incheon United (loan)	6	(1)
2012–2013	Atlético Goianiense	43	(6)
2014	Shijiazhuang Yongchang	14	(1)
2015	Botafogo	50	(2)
2016–2017	Criciúma	100	(13)
2018	Vila Nova	55	(3)
2019	Guarani	33	(0)
2020	Mirassol	0	(0)
2021–2022	Cascavel	30	(1)
- * Club domestic league appearances and goals

Diego da Silva Giaretta (born November 27, 1983), commonly known as Diego Giaretta, is a Brazilian former professional footballer who played as a centre-back or left-back.

== Career statistics ==
(Correct as of October 16, 2010)

Club	Season	State League		Brazilian Série A		Copa do Brasil		Copa Libertadores		Copa Sudamericana		Total	
Club	Season	Apps	Goals	Apps	Goals	Apps	Goals	Apps	Goals	Apps	Goals	Apps	Goals
Grêmio Prudente	2009	8	0	2	0	-	-	-	-	-	-	0	0
Botafogo	2009	-	-	12	0	-	-	-	-	?	?	?	?
Grêmio Prudente	2010	19	2	32	2	-	-	-	-	?	?	0	0
Total		27	2	34	2	-	-	-	-	?	?	?	?

== Honours ==
Botafogo

- Campeonato Brasileiro Série B: 2015

== Contract ==
- Grêmio Prudente.
