= Samcheok Stadium =

Sports venue in Samcheok, South Korea

- Interactive map of Samcheok Stadium
- Location: Samcheok, Gangwon-do, South Korea
- Owner: City of Samcheok
- Operator: City of Samcheok
- Capacity: 20,000
- Surface: Natural grass

Construction
- Opened: 1985

Tenant
- Hyundai Horangi(1987-1989)

Samcheok Stadium is a multi-purpose stadium in Samcheok, South Korea. It is currently used mostly for football matches. The stadium has a capacity of 20,000 people and was opened in 1985. It was home ground of Hyundai Horangi during 1987–1989.
