= Changwon United FC =

1998–2008 South Korean football club

Changwon United FC 창원 유나이티드 FC
- Full name: Changwon United Football Club 창원 유나이티드 축구단
- Short name: CUFC
- Founded: 1998; 28 years ago
- Dissolved: 2008; 18 years ago
- Ground: Changwon Civil Stadium; Pallyong artificial turf Ground
Home colours	Away colours

Changwon United Football Club (Korean: 창원 유나이티드 FC) was a South Korean football club, based in Changwon. Founded as Changwon Doodae FC in 1998, the club changed its name to Changwon United FC in August 2007. It used to be a member of the K3 League, but withdrew from it during the 2008 season.

The club was dissolved in the same year due to financial reasons.

== Season-by-season records ==
Season	K3 League											KFA Cup	Top scorer (League goals)	Manager
Season	Stage	Teams	P	W	D	L	GF	GA	GD	Pts	Position	KFA Cup	Top scorer (League goals)	Manager
2007	First	10	9	2	4	3	15	16	−1	10	7th	Did not qualify	(South Korea) Ko Sung-jang (11)	(South Korea) Min Byung-oh
2007	Second	10	9	0	2	7	13	31	−18	2	9th	Did not qualify	(South Korea) Ko Sung-jang (11)	(South Korea) Min Byung-oh
2007	Overall	10	18	2	6	10	28	47	−19	12	8th	Did not qualify	(South Korea) Ko Sung-jang (11)	(South Korea) Min Byung-oh
2008	First	16	15	1	2	12	23	56	−33	5	14th	Did not qualify		(South Korea) Min Byung-oh
2008	Second	Club was dissolved due to financial problems.										Did not qualify		(South Korea) Min Byung-oh
