= Jonhes =

Brazilian footballer (born 1979)

Personal information
- Full name: Jonhes Elias Pinto dos Santos
- Date of birth: 28 September 1979 (age 47)
- Place of birth: Goiânia, Brazil
- Height: 1.88 m (6 ft 2 in)
- Position: Center forward

Senior career*
Years	Team	Apps	(Gls)
2001–2002	Bandeirante		
2002	CFZ de Brasília		
2003–2004	Ceilândia		
2005	Gama		
2006	Ceilândia		
2006–2007	Brasiliense		
2007	Pohang Steelers	14	(4)
2008	Tianjin Teda	6	(1)
2009	FC Unirea Alba Iulia	3	(0)
2009	Brasiliense		
2010	Fortaleza		
2010	Gama	2	(0)
2011	CFZ de Brasília		
2011	Capital		
2012	Sobradinho	4	(0)
- * Club domestic league appearances and goals

Jonhes Elias Pinto dos Santos, shortly Jonhes (born 28 September 1979) is a Brazilian former footballer.

His prior clubs include Brasiliense, Gama, Ceilândia, CFZ de Brasília, Bandeirante and Pohang Steelers. Jonhes has played for Ceilândia Esporte Clube and Brasiliense Futebol Clube in the Copa do Brasil.

== Honors ==
- Campeonato Brasiliense in 2002 with CFZ de Brasília
- Campeonato Brasiliense in 2006, 2007 with Brasiliense
- K-League champion in 2007 with Pohang Steelers
