= Luizinho (footballer, born 1985) =

Brazilian footballer

Personal information
- Full name: Luis Carlos Fernandes
- Date of birth: 25 July 1985 (age 41)
- Place of birth: Mogi Guaçu, Brazil
- Height: 1.75 m (5 ft 9 in)
- Position: Forward

Youth career
- 1994–2004: Santos

Senior career*
Years	Team	Apps	(Gls)
2004–2006	Santos	3	(0)
2005	→ Portuguesa (loan)		
2006	→ Taubaté (loan)		
2006	→ Ipatinga (loan)		
2007	Daegu FC	23	(11)
2008–2009	Ulsan Hyundai	21	(9)
2010–2011	Al Arabi	4	(0)
2011	Incheon United	7	(1)
2011–2012	Santo André	12	(1)
2013	São José-RS	14	(0)
2013	Gwangju FC	4	(1)
2014	Suphanburi	13	(5)
2014	Army United	7	(0)
2015	Itumbiara	7	(0)
2016	Juventus-SP	11	(1)
- * Club domestic league appearances and goals

Luís Carlos Fernandes (born 25 July 1985), commonly known as Luizinho, is a Brazilian retired footballer who played as a forward.

== Career ==
He spent his career playing mainly in Asia from 2007 to 2015. On 2 March 2011, Luizinho joined the South Korean club Incheon United, where he signed a contract until 2013. But, his contract was terminated after four months.

He played domestically for Santos, Portuguesa, Taubaté, Ipatinga, Santo André São José-RS and Itumbiara EC, in South Korea for Daegu FC, Ulsan Hyundai, Incheon United and Gwangju FC, for Kuwaiti club Al Arabi, and in Thailand for Suphanburi and Army United.

== Honor ==
Individual

- Hauzen Cup 2007 Best scorer (9 App, 7 Goals)
