= 2016 Korean FA Cup =

2016 KEB Hana Bank FA Cup

Tournament details
- Country: South Korea
- Date: 12 March – 3 December 2016
- Teams: 83

Final positions
- Champions: Suwon Samsung Bluewings (4th title)
- Runners-up: FC Seoul

Tournament statistics
- Top goal scorer: Adriano (5 goals)

Awards
- Best player: Yeom Ki-hun

The 2016 Korean FA Cup, known as 2016 KEB Hana Bank FA Cup, was the 21st edition of the Korean FA Cup. Suwon Samsung Bluewings won their fourth FA Cup title after defeating defending champions FC Seoul in the final, and qualified for the 2017 AFC Champions League.

== Qualifying rounds ==
=== First round ===
The first round was held on 12 and 13 March 2016.

12 March 2016	Cheongju University	4–1	Mokpo Christian Hospital	Cheongju University, Cheongju
11:00 UTC+09:00

12 March 2016	Siheung Citizen	2–3	Yonsei University	Gimcheon Stadium, Gimcheon
11:00 UTC+09:00

12 March 2016	Goyang Citizen	4–1	Jeju City	Eoulimnuri Byeolmuri ground, Goyang
14:00 UTC+09:00

12 March 2016	Ulsan Sejong Industry	0–1	Yeonggwang FC	Ulsan Stadium, Ulsan
14:00 UTC+09:00

12 March 2016	Konkuk University	3–0	LG Electronics	Chungju Stadium, Chungju
14:00 UTC+09:00

12 March 2016	SK Hynix	1–2	FC Uijeongbu	Icheon Stadium's Auxiliary Stadium, Icheon
14:00 UTC+09:00

12 March 2016	Hannam University	3–2	Nexen Tire	Hannam University, Daejeon
14:00 UTC+09:00

12 March 2016	Fuji Xerox	4–2	Seonam University	Suwon young-heung Sports Park, Suwon
14:00 UTC+09:00

12 March 2016	Sangji University	7–1	Daewoong Bio	Sangji University, Wonju
14:00 UTC+09:00

12 March 2016	Pyeongchang FC	0–2	Halla University	Pyeongchang Stadium, Pyeongchang
14:00 UTC+09:00

12 March 2016	Yangpyeong FC	1–0	Hanyang University	Yongmoon Sports Park
14:00 UTC+09:00

12 March 2016	Soongsil University	1–0	Dong-Eui University	Gimcheon Stadium, Gimcheon
14:00 UTC+09:00

13 March 2016	Samsung Electronics	3–6 (a.e.t.)	Buyeo FC	Gimcheon Stadium, Gimcheon
11:00 UTC+09:00

13 March 2016	Seoul United	2–3	SMC Engineering	Hyochang Stadium, Seoul
15:00 UTC+09:00

=== Second round ===
The second round was held on 26 March 2016.

26 March 2016	Soongsil University	0–0 (a.e.t.) (0–3 p)	Dankook University
11:00 UTC+09:00

26 March 2016	Cheongju University	0–3	Hwaseong FC	Cheongju University Playground, Cheongju
14:00 UTC+09:00

26 March 2016	Kyung Hee University	3–2	Jungnang Chorus Mustang	Yongin Football Center Fourth Stadium, Yongin
14:00 UTC+09:00

26 March 2016	Cheongju FC	0–2	Korea University
14:00 UTC+09:00

26 March 2016	Yangju Citizen	3–3 (a.e.t.) (4–2 p)	Ajou University
14:00 UTC+09:00

26 March 2016	Hannam University	2–0	Chuncheon FC	Hannam University, Daejeon
14:00 UTC+09:00

26 March 2016	Cheongju City	1–0	Gwangju University
14:00 UTC+09:00

26 March 2016	Yeonggwang FC	0–4	Yonsei University
14:00 UTC+09:00

26 March 2016	Sangji University	3–2	SMC Engineering	Sangji University Playground, Wonju
14:00 UTC+09:00

26 March 2016	Halla University	2–1	Icheon Citizen	Halla University Playground, Wonju
14:00 UTC+09:00

26 March 2016	Fuji Xerox	1–4	Konkuk University
: UTC+09:00

26 March 2016	Incheon National University	1–0	Buyeo FC	Incheon National University Playground, Incheon
14:00 UTC+09:00

26 March 2016	Sungkyunkwan University	4–3	FC Uijeongbu	Sungkyunkwan University Playground
14:00 UTC+09:00

26 March 2016	Goyang Citizen	1–2	Paju Citizen	Goyang Sport Complex, Goyang
14:00 UTC+09:00

26 March 2016	Yangpyeong FC	2–1	Jeonju Citizen
14:00 UTC+09:00

26 March 2016	Gimpo Citizen	2–3	Yong In University
14:00 UTC+09:00

26 March 2016	Yeungnam University	3–1	Honam University	Yeungnam University Artificial Ground, Gyeongsan
14:00 UTC+09:00

=== Third round ===
The third round matches were played between 23 April and 3 May 2016.

23 April 2016	Yongin City	1–0 (a.e.t.)	Changwon FC	Yongin Football Center, Yongin
14:00 UTC+09:00

23 April 2016	Cheonan City	0–0 (a.e.t.) (3–4 p)	Gyeongju KHNP	Cheonan Football Center, Cheonan
14:00 UTC+09:00

23 April 2016	Hyundai Mipo Dockyard	0–1	Gangwon FC	Ulsan Stadium, Ulsan
15:00 UTC+09:00

23 April 2016	Paju Citizen	0–3	Daejeon Korail
15:00 UTC+09:00

23 April 2016	Yangju Citizen	1–1 (a.e.t.) (3–5 p)	Gyeongju Citizen
16:00 UTC+09:00

27 April 2016	Gimhae FC	2–3	FC Anyang	Gimhae Stadium, Gimhae
19:00 UTC+09:00

27 April 2016	Ansan Mugunghwa	3–0	Sangji University	Ansan Wa~ Stadium, Ansan
19:00 UTC+09:00

27 April 2016	Busan Transportation Corporation	2–0	Hannam University	Busan Gudeok Stadium, Busan
19:00 UTC+09:00

27 April 2016	Hwaseong FC	0–2	Seoul E-Land	Hwaseong Stadium, Hwaseong
19:00 UTC+09:00

27 April 2016	Daegu FC	2–1	Chungju Hummel	Daegu Stadium, Daegu
19:00 UTC+09:00

27 April 2016	Gyeongnam FC	1–2	Busan IPark	Changwon Football Center, Changwon
19:00 UTC+09:00

27 April 2016	Goyang Zaicro	0–1	Gangneung City	Goyang Stadium, Goyang
19:00 UTC+09:00

27 April 2016	Mokpo City	2–3	Dankook University	Mokpo International Football Center, Mokpo
19:00 UTC+09:00

27 April 2016	Daejeon Citizen	3–0	Yonsei University	Daejeon World Cup Stadium, Daejeon
19:30 UTC+09:00

27 April 2016	Bucheon FC 1995	3–1 (a.e.t.)	Halla University	Bucheon Stadium, Bucheon
19:30 UTC+09:00

30 April 2016	Cheongju City	1–1 (a.e.t.) (4–3 p)	Yong In University
14:00 UTC+09:00

30 April 2016	Yangpyeong FC	1–3	Yeungnam University
14:00 UTC+09:00

30 April 2016	Sungkyunkwan University	1–0	Incheon National University	Sungkyunkwan University Playground
14:00 UTC+09:00

30 April 2016	Kyung Hee University	0–1	Konkuk University	Yongin Football Center, Yongin
14:00 UTC+09:00

3 May 2016	FC Pocheon	3–1	Korea University	Pocheon Stadium, Pocheon
16:00 UTC+09:00

== Final rounds ==
=== Bracket ===
Round of 32
FC Seoul (a.e.t.)	4
Daegu FC	2
Ansan Mugunghwa (a.e.t.)	3
Konkuk University	2
Jeonnam Dragons	4
Gangwon FC	0
Gangneung City	1 (3)
Yongin City	1 (4)
Jeonbuk Hyundai Motors	4
FC Anyang	1
Sangju Sangmu	1
Dankook University	2
Pohang Steelers	0
Bucheon FC 1995	2
Gyeongju Citizen	2
FC Pocheon	1
Suwon Samsung Bluewings	1
Gyeongju KHNP	0
Busan IPark	3
Busan Transportation Corporation	0
Seongnam FC	1
Yeungnam University	0
Seoul E-Land	2 (1)
Sungkyunkwan University (p)	2 (3)
Ulsan Hyundai	2
Daejeon Korail	0
Jeju United	1 (3)
Gwangju FC (p)	1 (5)
Incheon United	1
Cheongju City	0
Daejeon Citizen (p)	1 (3)
Suwon FC	1 (1)

Round of 16
FC Seoul	2
Ansan Mugunghwa	1
Jeonnam Dragons	4
Yongin City	2
Jeonbuk Hyundai Motors (a.e.t.)	3
Dankook University	1
Bucheon FC 1995	3
Gyeongju Citizen	1
Suwon Samsung Bluewings	1
Busan IPark	0
Seongnam FC	2
Sungkyunkwan University	0
Ulsan Hyundai	1
Gwangju FC	0
Incheon United (a.e.t.)	3
Daejeon Citizen	2

Quarter-finals
FC Seoul (p)	0 (4)
Jeonnam Dragons	0 (3)
Jeonbuk Hyundai Motors	2
Bucheon FC 1995	3
Suwon Samsung Bluewings (p)	1 (4)
Seongnam FC	1 (3)
Ulsan Hyundai	4
Incheon United	1

Semi-finals
26 October – Seoul
FC Seoul	1
Bucheon FC 1995	0
26 October – Ulsan
Suwon Samsung Bluewings	3
Ulsan Hyundai	1

Final
27 November, 3 December
FC Seoul	1	2	3 (9)
Suwon Samsung Bluewings (p)	2	1	3 (10)

=== Round of 32 ===
The round of 32 was held on 11 May 2016.

11 May 2016	Yongin City	1–1 (a.e.t.) (4–3 p)	Gangneung City	Yongin Football Center, Yongin
16:00 UTC+09:00	63'		75'

11 May 2016	FC Pocheon	1–2	Gyeongju Citizen	Pocheon Stadium, Pocheon
16:00 UTC+09:00	Kim Won-min 30'		18'; 48'

11 May 2016	Seoul E-Land	2–2 (a.e.t.) (1–3 p)	Sungkyunkwan University	Seoul Olympic Stadium, Seoul
16:00 UTC+09:00	Tarabai 65' (pen.), 106'		58'; 110'

11 May 2016	Daejeon Korail	0–2	Ulsan Hyundai	Daejeon Hanbat Sports Complex, Daejeon
19:00 UTC+09:00			Lee Chang-yong 6'; Lee Jae-sung 83'

11 May 2016	Sangju Sangmu	1–2	Dankook University	Sangju Civic Stadium, Sangju
19:00 UTC+09:00	Cho Young-cheol 89'		32'; 74'

11 May 2016	Incheon United	1–0	Cheongju City	Incheon Football Stadium, Incheon
19:00 UTC+09:00	Kim Dong-suk 49'

11 May 2016	Jeonnam Dragons	4–0	Gangwon FC	Gwangyang Football Stadium, Gwangyang
19:00 UTC+09:00	Jeong Seok-min 4'; Oršić 13', 72'; Jugović 22'

11 May 2016	Ansan Mugunghwa	3–2 (a.e.t.)	Konkuk University	Ansan Wa~ Stadium, Ansan
19:00 UTC+09:00	52'; Choi Bo-kyung 85', 115'		71'; 89'

11 May 2016	Pohang Steelers	0–2	Bucheon FC 1995	Pohang Steel Yard, Pohang
19:30 UTC+09:00			Kim Ryun-do 59'; 71'

11 May 2016	Suwon Samsung Bluewings	1–0	Gyeongju KHNP	Suwon World Cup Stadium, Suwon
19:30 UTC+09:00	Kwak Kwang-seon 15'

11 May 2016	FC Seoul	4–2 (a.e.t.)	Daegu FC	Seoul World Cup Stadium, Seoul
19:30 UTC+09:00	Adriano 74', 77', 103', 120'		Cesinha 39', 53'

11 May 2016	Daejeon Citizen	1–1 (a.e.t.) (3–1 p)	Suwon FC	Daejeon World Cup Stadium, Daejeon
19:30 UTC+09:00	Wanderson 87' (pen.)		Lee Seung-yeoul 63'

11 May 2016	Seongnam FC	1–0	Yeungnam University	Tancheon Stadium, Seongnam
19:30 UTC+09:00	Park Yong-ji 90+3'

11 May 2016	Jeju United	1–1 (a.e.t.) (3–5 p)	Gwangju FC	Jeju World Cup Stadium, Seogwipo
20:00 UTC+09:00	Oh Ban-suk 38'		Wada 48'

11 May 2016	Busan IPark	3–0	Busan Transportation Corporation	Busan Asiad Main Stadium, Busan
20:00 UTC+09:00	Lee Won-young 40'; Ko Kyung-min 49'; Lee Yeong-jae 69'

11 May 2016	FC Anyang	1–4	Jeonbuk Hyundai Motors	Anyang Sports Complex, Anyang
20:00 UTC+09:00	An Se-hee 40'		Seo Sang-min 24'; 60'; Leonardo 76'; Lee Jong-ho 80'

=== Round of 16 ===
The round of 16 was held on 22 June 2016.

22 June 2016	Jeonnam Dragons	4–2	Yongin City	Gwangyang Football Stadium, Gwangyang
19:00 UTC+09:00	Ristić 6', 10'; Jeong Seok-min 59'; Cho Seok-jae 66'	Report	Seon Seung-woo 28'; Cho Won-tae 90'	Attendance: 367

22 June 2016	Jeonbuk Hyundai Motors	3–1 (a.e.t.)	Dankook University	Jeonju World Cup Stadium, Jeonju
19:00 UTC+09:00	Lee Jong-ho 61', 111'; Kim Shin-wook 115'	Report	Lee Gi-un 55'	Attendance: 3,285

22 June 2016	Incheon United	3–2 (a.e.t.)	Daejeon Citizen	Incheon Football Stadium, Incheon
19:00 UTC+09:00	Kim Dae-joong 27'; Oris 69'; Kim Do-hyuk 99'	Report	Seo Dong-hyeon 73'; Wanderson 90+4'	Attendance: 1,173

22 June 2016	Suwon Samsung Bluewings	1–0	Busan IPark	Suwon World Cup Stadium, Suwon
19:30 UTC+09:00	Júnior Santos 30'	Report		Attendance: 4,237

22 June 2016	FC Seoul	2–1	Ansan Mugunghwa	Seoul World Cup Stadium, Seoul
19:30 UTC+09:00	Yun Ju-tae 30', 55'	Report	Hwang Ji-woong 76'	Attendance: 3,993

22 June 2016	Bucheon FC 1995	3–1	Gyeongju Citizen	Bucheon Stadium, Bucheon
19:30 UTC+09:00	Jeon Ki-sung 6'; Kim Ryun-do 67'; Shin Hyun-jun 84'	Report	Park Dong-hui 30'	Attendance: 457

22 June 2016	Ulsan Hyundai	1–0	Gwangju FC	Ulsan Munsu Football Stadium, Ulsan
19:30 UTC+09:00	Lee Chang-yong 75'	Report		Attendance: 595

22 June 2016	Seongnam FC	2–0	Sungkyunkwan University	Tancheon Stadium, Seongnam
19:30 UTC+09:00	Jo Jae-cheol 69'; Sung Bong-jae 79'	Report		Attendance: 1,509

=== Quarter-finals ===
The quarter-finals were held on 13 July 2016.

13 July 2016	FC Seoul	0–0 (a.e.t.) (4–3 p)	Jeonnam Dragons	Seoul World Cup Stadium, Seoul
19:30 UTC+09:00		Report		Attendance: 5,233
	Penalties
	Park Chu-young (penalty scored); Damjanović (penalty scored); Lee Sang-hyeob (penalty scored); Kim Chi-woo (penalty scored)		(penalty scored) Jair; (penalty scored) Bang Dae-jong; (penalty scored) Lee Ji-nam; (penalty missed) Jugović; (penalty missed) Ahn Yong-woo

13 July 2016	Jeonbuk Hyundai Motors	2–3	Bucheon FC 1995	Jeonju World Cup Stadium, Jeonju
19:00 UTC+09:00	Kim Shin-wook 25'; Leonardo 90+4' (pen.)	Report	Lee Hyo-kyun 37'; Lee Hak-min 66'; Waguininho 90'	Attendance: 6,428

13 July 2016	Suwon Samsung Bluewings	1–1 (a.e.t.) (4–3 p)	Seongnam FC	Suwon World Cup Stadium, Suwon
19:30 UTC+09:00	Ko Cha-won 24'	Report	Pitu 84'	Attendance: 5,598
	Penalties
	Yeom Ki-hun (penalty scored); Park Hyun-beom (penalty scored); Shin Se-gye (penalty scored); Lee Jung-soo (penalty scored)		(penalty scored) Pitu; (penalty missed) Lim Chae-min; (penalty scored) Lee Tae-hee; (penalty scored) Kim Hyun; (penalty missed) Jung Seon-ho

13 July 2016	Ulsan Hyundai	4–1	Incheon United	Ulsan Munsu Football Stadium, Ulsan
19:30 UTC+09:00	Kim Keon-woong 15'; Mendy 37', 66'; Kim Tae-hwan 52' (pen.)	Report	Kim Dae-joong 59'	Attendance: 400

=== Semi-finals ===
The semi-finals were held on 26 October 2016.

26 October 2016	FC Seoul	1–0	Bucheon FC 1995	Seoul World Cup Stadium, Seoul
19:30 UTC+09:00	Damjanović 7'	Report		Attendance: 5,843; Referee: Kim Dong-jin

26 October 2016	Ulsan Hyundai	1–3	Suwon Samsung Bluewings	Ulsan Munsu Football Stadium, Ulsan
19:30 UTC+09:00	Kovačec 39' (pen.)	Report	Johnathan 81', 90+2'; Kwon Chang-hoon 90+4'	Attendance: 3,015; Referee: Woo Sang-il

=== Final ===
The final was held on 27 November and 3 December 2016.

27 November 2016 First leg	Suwon Samsung Bluewings	2–1	FC Seoul	Suwon World Cup Stadium, Suwon
14:00 UTC+09:00	Johnathan 15'; Yeom Ki-hun 58'	Report	Ju Se-jong 50'	Attendance: 31,034

3 December 2016 Second leg	FC Seoul	2–1 (a.e.t.) (3–3 agg.) (9–10 p)	Suwon Samsung Bluewings	Seoul World Cup Stadium, Seoul
13:30 UTC+09:00	Adriano 75'; Yoon Seung-won 90+3'	Report	Johnathan 55'	Attendance: 35,037
	Penalties
	Kwak Tae-hwi (penalty scored); Go Yo-han (penalty scored); Osmar (penalty scored); Ju Se-jong (penalty scored); Adriano (penalty scored); Lee Seok-hyun (penalty scored); Ko Kwang-min (penalty scored); Cho Chan-ho (penalty scored); Yoon Seung-won (penalty scored); Yu Sang-hun (penalty missed)		Júnior Santos (penalty scored); Yang Sang-min (penalty scored); Cho Won-hee (penalty scored); Cho Dong-geon (penalty scored); Yeom Ki-hun (penalty scored); Kwak Kwang-seon (penalty scored); Hong Chul (penalty scored); Koo Ja-ryong (penalty scored); Jang Ho-ik (penalty scored); Yang Hyung-mo (penalty scored)

== See also ==
- 2016 in South Korean football
- 2016 K League Classic
- 2016 K League Challenge
- 2016 Korea National League
- 2016 K3 League
