= Lim Chai-min =

South Korean footballer

Lim Chai-Min
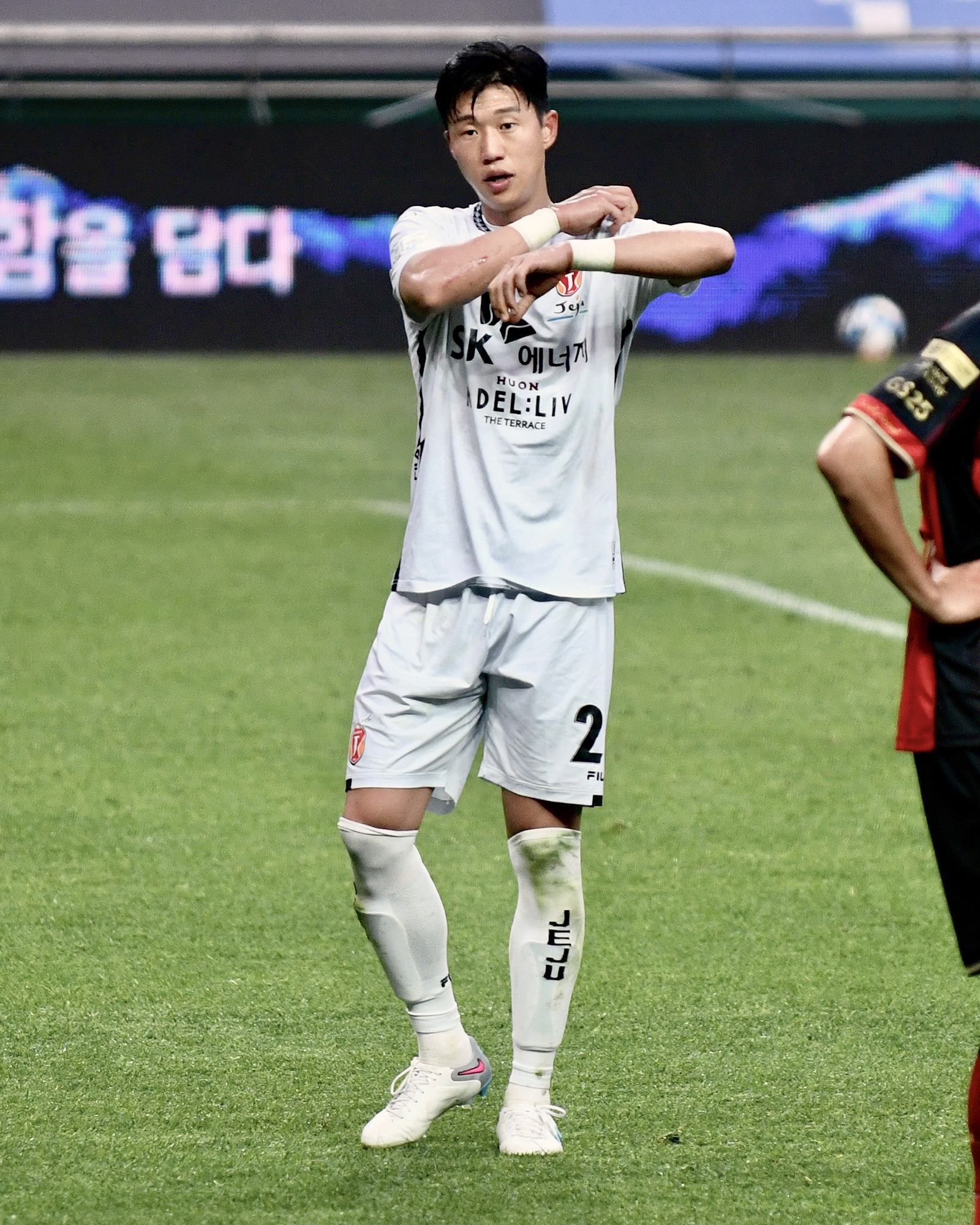
- Lim in 2023

Personal information
- Full name: Lim Chai-Min
- Date of birth: 18 November 1990 (age 35)
- Place of birth: South Korea
- Height: 1.85 m (6 ft 1 in)
- Position: Centre back

Team information
- Current team: Yongin FC
- Number: 26

Youth career
- Youngnam University

Senior career*
| Years | Team | Apps | (Gls) |
| 2013–2019 | Seongnam FC | 124 | (5) |
| 2017–2018 | → Sangju Sangmu (army) | 37 | (3) |
| 2020–2022 | Gangwon FC | 54 | (2) |
| 2022–2023 | Shenzhen FC | 24 | (1) |
| 2023–2025 | Jeju SK FC | 77 | (1) |
| 2026– | Yongin FC | 10 | (0) |

International career
| 2014 | South Korea | 1 | (0) |
- * Club domestic league appearances and goals as of 5 August 2026

Lim Chai-Min (Korean: 임채민; Hanja: 林採民; born 18 November 1990) is a South Korean footballer who plays as centre back for Yongin FC.

== Career ==
He signed with Seongnam Ilhwa on 7 December 2012. He made his debut in the league match against Gyeongnam FC on 19 May 2013.

== Career statistics ==
=== Club ===
As of 8 April 2024

| Club | Season | League | | | Cup | | Continental | | Other | | Total | |
| Club | Season | Division | Apps | Goals | Apps | Goals | Apps | Goals | Apps | Goals | Apps | Goals |
|---|---|---|---|---|---|---|---|---|---|---|---|---|
| Seongnam FC | 2013 | K League 1 | 21 | 3 | 1 | 0 | — | | — | | 22 | 3 |
| Seongnam FC | 2014 | K League 1 | 34 | 0 | 3 | 0 | — | | — | | 37 | 0 |
| Seongnam FC | 2015 | K League 1 | 13 | 0 | 0 | 0 | 8 (Note: Appearance(s) in AFC Champions League) | 0 | — | | 21 | 0 |
| Seongnam FC | 2016 | K League 1 | 21 | 0 | 2 | 0 | — | | 2 (Note: Appearance(s) in Promotion/Relegation play-offs) | 0 | 25 | 0 |
| Seongnam FC | 2018 | K League 2 | 10 | 0 | — | | — | | — | | 10 | 0 |
| Seongnam FC | 2019 | K League 1 | 25 | 2 | — | | — | | — | | 25 | 2 |
| Seongnam FC | Total | | 124 | 5 | 6 | 0 | 8 | 0 | 2 | 0 | 140 | 5 |
| Sangju Sangmu (Army) | 2017 | K League 1 | 20 | 1 | 2 | 0 | — | | 2 | 0 | 24 | 1 |
| Sangju Sangmu (Army) | 2018 | K League 1 | 17 | 2 | — | | — | | — | | 17 | 2 |
| Sangju Sangmu (Army) | Total | | 37 | 3 | 2 | 0 | — | | 2 | 0 | 41 | 3 |
| Gangwon FC | 2020 | K League 1 | 26 | 1 | 1 | 0 | — | | — | | 27 | 1 |
| Gangwon FC | 2021 | K League 1 | 28 | 1 | 2 | 0 | — | | 2 | 1 | 32 | 2 |
| Gangwon FC | 2022 | K League 1 | 0 | 0 | — | | — | | — | | 0 | 0 |
| Gangwon FC | Total | | 54 | 2 | 3 | 0 | — | | 2 | 1 | 59 | 3 |
| Shenzhen FC | 2022 | Chinese Super League | 24 | 1 | 0 | 0 | — | | — | | 24 | 1 |
| Jeju SK FC | 2023 | K League 1 | 26 | 1 | 3 | 0 | — | | — | | 29 | 1 |
| Jeju SK FC | 2024 | K League 1 | 5 | 0 | — | | — | | — | | 5 | 0 |
| Jeju SK FC | Total | | 31 | 1 | 3 | 0 | — | | — | | 34 | 1 |
| Career Total | | | 270 | 12 | 15 | 0 | 8 | 0 | 6 | 1 | 299 | 13 |
