= 2018 K3 League Basic =

K3 League Basic
- Season: 2018
- Champions: Siheung Citizen (1st title)
- Matches: 110
- Goals: 443 (4.03 per match)
- Best Player: Park Min-seon
- Top goalscorer: Bang Chan-joon (25 goals)

The 2018 K3 League Basic was the second season of the K3 League Basic. Yeoju Sejong and Chungju Citizen joined the league in this season. The top two teams were directly promoted to the K3 League Advanced, and the third, fourth and fifth-placed teams qualified for the promotion playoffs.

== Teams ==
=== Team changes ===
Relegated from K3 League Advanced

- Paju Citizen
- Yangju Citizen

Promoted to K3 League Advanced

- Seoul Jungnang
- Pyeongtaek Citizen

Newly joined

- Yeoju Sejong
- Chungju Citizen

=== General information ===
Club	City	Stadium	Capacity	Manager
Busan FC	Busan	Busan Asiad Supplementary Stadium	15,000	(South Korea) Kim Jong-mun
Buyeo FC	Buyeo	Buyeo Sports Complex	6,000	(South Korea) Kang Jeong-hoon
Chungju Citizen	Chungju	Tangumdae Football Stadium	600	(South Korea) Gong Mun-bae
Goyang Citizen	Goyang	Goyang Sports Complex	41,311	(South Korea) Kim Jin-ok
Paju Citizen	Paju	Paju Stadium	23,000	(South Korea) Jeong Seong-hoon
Pyeongchang FC	Pyeongchang	Pyeongchang Sports Complex	6,000	(South Korea) An Hong-min
Siheung Citizen	Siheung	Jeongwang Sports Park	200	(Brazil) Gléguer Zorzin
Seoul United	Seoul	Nowon Madeul Stadium	446	(South Korea) Jo Dong-hyun
Yangju Citizen	Pyeongtaek	Yangju Godeok Stadium	15,000	(South Korea) Kim Sung-il
Yeoju Sejong	Yeoju	Yeoju Sports Complex	21,600	(South Korea) Oh Ju-po
FC Uijeongbu	Uijeongbu	Uijeongbu Sports Complex	28,000	(South Korea) Kim Hee-tae

== League table ==
Pos	Team	Pld	W	D	L	GF	GA	GD	Pts	Promotion or qualification
1	Siheung Citizen (C, P)	20	15	1	4	40	10	+30	46	Promotion to the K3 League Advanced
2	Paju Citizen (P)	20	14	1	5	61	15	+46	43	Promotion to the K3 League Advanced
3	Busan FC (Note: Busan FC was dissolved just after the regular season.)	20	12	4	4	46	17	+29	40	
4	Chungju Citizen (O, P)	20	13	1	6	45	17	+28	40	Qualification for the promotion playoff
5	Yangju Citizen	20	11	5	4	41	19	+22	38	Qualification for the promotion playoff
6	Yeoju Sejong	20	11	1	8	50	29	+21	34	
7	Buyeo FC	20	7	3	10	47	41	+6	24	
8	Pyeongchang FC	20	4	6	10	37	51	−14	18	
9	Goyang Citizen	20	4	1	15	20	78	−58	13	
10	Seoul United	20	3	3	14	31	62	−31	12	
11	FC Uijeongbu	20	2	2	16	25	104	−79	8	

Source: 7m.com JoinKFA
Rules for classification: 1) Points; 2) Goal difference; 3) Goals scored.
(C) Champions; (O) Play-off winners; (P) Promoted

== Results ==
Home \ Away	SC	PC	CC	YSF	YC	BUS	BUY	PFC	GC	SU	UIJ
Siheung Citizen	—	0–1	2–0	1–0	1–2	1–1	4–0	2–0	0–1	5–0	5–1
Paju Citizen	1–2	—	0–2	1–0	3–0	1–1	0–2	3–1	5–1	4–0	11–0
Chungju Citizen	0–1	1–0	—	0–1	0–0	1–0	2–0	3–0	7–0	4–2	3–0
Yeoju Sejong	0–1	0–4	3–0	—	1–1	0–3	8–5	3–0	3–0	3–1	13–0
Yangju Citizen	2–0	2–3	1–2	6–2	—	1–0	2–1	3–0	3–0	5–1	1–1
Busan FC	0–1	0–1	1–0*	3–0	2–0	—	2–1	2–2	6–1	6–0	4–1
Buyeo FC	1–2*	0–3	4–0	1–2	0–2	1–2	—	2–2	6–0	2–1	3–1
Pyeongchang FC	0–4	2–1	0–3	0–3	1–1	1–1	4–4	—	6–1	3–2	6–1
Goyang Citizen	0–2	0–8	0–4	0–5	1–2	1–5	1–5	4–3	—	2–2	3–1
Seoul United	0–2	0–5	1–5	2–1	0–0	2–3	1–1	5–3	1–2	—	7–0
FC Uijeongbu	0–4	1–6	1–9	0–2	0–7	2–4	2–8	3–3	4–3	6–4	—

Source: JoinKFA
Legend: Blue = home team win; Yellow = draw; Red = away team win.

== Promotion playoff ==
When the match was finished as a draw, its winners were decided on the regular season rankings without extra time and the penalty shoot-out. Therefore, Chungju Citizen was promoted to the K3 League Advanced after the draw.

11 November 2018

Chungju Citizen	0–0	Yangju Citizen
	Report

Chungju Tangeumdae Stadium, Chungju

== See also ==
- 2018 in South Korean football
- 2018 Korean FA Cup
