= 2017 K3 League Basic =

K3 League Basic
- Season: 2017
- Champions: Jungnang Chorus Mustang (1st title)
- Matches: 80
- Goals: 267 (3.34 per match)
- Best Player: Park Jae-cheol
- Top goalscorer: Roberto Henrique (13 goals)

The 2017 K3 League Basic was the first season of the K3 League Basic.

The second division of the K3 League was founded under the name of "K3 League Basic" in 2017, and the bottom eight teams of the 2016 K3 League participated in its inaugural season. Newly formed clubs Busan FC and Pyeongtaek G-SMATT also joined it.

After the regular season, the champions were promoted to the first division "K3 League Advanced" and four teams from second to fifth-placed team qualified for the promotion playoffs.

== Teams ==
Yeonggwang FC withdrew from the K3 League Basic after becoming one of eight teams relegated from the K3 League.

Club	City	Stadium	Manager
Relegated from K3 League
Buyeo FC	Buyeo	Buyeo Stadium	(South Korea) Kang Jeong-hoon
Goyang Citizen	Goyang	Goyang Eoulimnuri ground	(South Korea) Kim Jin-ok
Jungnang Chorus Mustang	Seoul	Jungnang Public Ground	(South Korea) Yoo Bong-ki
Pyeongchang FC	Pyeongchang	Pyeongchang Stadium	(South Korea) Hwang Young-woo
Siheung Citizen	Siheung	Siheung Stadium	(Spain) Kike Linero
Seoul United	Seoul	Madeul Stadium	(South Korea) Kim Chang-kyum
FC Uijeongbu	Uijeongbu	Uijeongbu Stadium	(South Korea) Kim Hee-tae
Newly formed
Busan FC	Busan	Busan Asiad Supplementary Stadium	(South Korea) ?
Pyeongtaek G-SMATT	Pyeongtaek	Sosabeol Reports Town	(South Korea) ?

== League table ==
Pos	Team	Pld	W	D	L	GF	GA	GD	Pts	Promotion or qualification
1	Jungnang Chorus Mustang (C, P)	16	12	4	0	43	12	+31	40	Promotion to the K3 League Advanced
2	Siheung Citizen	16	13	0	3	32	17	+15	39	Qualification for the promotion playoffs
3	Pyeongtaek G-SMATT (O, P)	16	8	3	5	38	26	+12	27	Qualification for the promotion playoffs
4	Buyeo FC	16	8	3	5	23	18	+5	27	Qualification for the promotion playoffs
5	FC Uijeongbu	16	8	0	8	35	25	+10	24	Qualification for the promotion playoffs
6	Busan FC	16	6	3	7	34	35	−1	21	
7	Pyeongchang FC	16	5	3	8	27	29	−2	18	
8	Goyang Citizen	16	2	2	12	16	41	−25	8	
9	Seoul United	16	0	2	14	19	64	−45	2	

Source: KFA
Rules for classification: 1) Points; 2) Goal difference; 3) Goals scored.
(C) Champions; (O) Play-off winners; (P) Promoted

== Results ==
Home \ Away	JCM	CIT	PGS	BUY	UIJ	BUS	PYE	GOY	SU
Jungnang Chorus Mustang	—	5–0	1–1	3–1	2–0	1–1	2–1	4–1	4–0
Siheung Citizen	1–3	—	3–2	1–2	2–0	2–0	1–0	1–0	3–1
Pyeongtaek G-SMATT	1–4	1–2	—	0–0	4–2	4–3	2–1	3–0	4–0
Buyeo FC	2–2	0–1	3–2	—	0–2	0–1	2–1	0–0	4–1
FC Uijeongbu	0–2	0–2	3–1	1–3	—	6–0	2–1	7–1	4–0
Busan FC	0–3	1–2	1–2	0–2	2–1	—	2–2	3–1	9–4
Pyeongchang FC	1–1	0–6	1–1	2–1	1–2	0–5	—	2–0	4–0
Goyang Citizen	1–3	2–3	1–5	1–2	1–0	1–2	1–2	—	3–3
Seoul United	1–3	0–2*	1–5	0–1	3–5	4–4	1–7	0–2	—

Source: JoinKFA
Legend: Blue = home team win; Yellow = draw; Red = away team win.

== Promotion playoffs ==
When a match was finished as a draw, its winners were decided on the regular season rankings without extra time and the penalty shoot-out.

Semi-finals
2 Siheung Citizen	1
5 FC Uijeongbu	2
3 Pyeongtaek G-SMATT	3
4 Buyeo FC	0

Final
5 FC Uijeongbu	2
3 Pyeongtaek G-SMATT	2

== See also ==
- 2017 in South Korean football
- 2017 Korean FA Cup
