= Wanderson (footballer, born 1989) =

Brazilian footballer (born 1989)

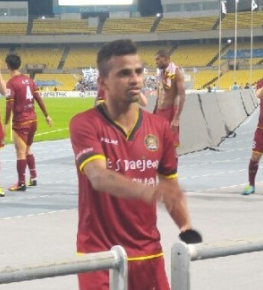

Personal information
- Full name: Wanderson Carvalho de Oliveira
- Date of birth: 31 March 1989 (age 37)
- Place of birth: Santa Inês, Brazil
- Height: 1.72 m (5 ft 8 in)
- Positions: Left-back; winger

Team information
- Current team: Pohang Steelers
- Number: 77

Senior career*
Years	Team	Apps	(Gls)
2011	Bahia de Feira	1	(0)
2012	América-RN	32	(2)
2013	→ América Mineiro (loan)	2	(0)
2013	América-RN	11	(1)
2014–2016	Tombense	0	(0)
2014	→ América-RN (loan)	32	(1)
2015	→ Fortaleza (loan)	4	(0)
2015–2016	→ Daejeon Citizen (loan)	33	(11)
2016	→ Jeju United (loan)	14	(4)
2017–2018	Atlético Goianiense	0	(0)
2017	→ Pohang Steelers (loan)	19	(1)
2018	→ Jeonnam Dragons (loan)	33	(4)
2019–2020	Pohang Steelers	38	(15)
2020–2021	Ittihad Kalba	26	(1)
2022–	Pohang Steelers	102	(10)
- * Club domestic league appearances and goals as of 3 August 2026

Wanderson Carvalho de Oliveira (born 31 March 1989), simply known as Wanderson, is a Brazilian professional footballer who plays as a left back or winger for Pohang Steelers of K League 1.

== Career ==
Wanderson has played for Bahia de Feira, América RN, América MG, Tombense and Fortaleza at various levels of Brazilian football.

Wanderson joined Daejeon Citizen in K League 1 in July 2015, scoring two goals in his debut.

In March 2022, Wanderson, one of the game's most decorated left backs, who can also play striker and attacking midfield due to his creative ability, came back to Pohang Steelers.

== Career statistics ==
=== Club ===
As of 5 April 2024

Club	Season	League			State League		Cup		Continental		Other		Total	
Club	Season	Division	Apps	Goals	Apps	Goals	Apps	Goals	Apps	Goals	Apps	Goals	Apps	Goals
Bahia de Feira	2011	Campeonato Baiano	—		1	0	—		—		—		1	0
América RN	2012	Série B	32	2	—		2	0	—		—		34	2
América RN	2013	Série B	11	1	—		—		—		—		11	1
América RN	Total		43	3	—		2	0	—		—		45	3
América Mineiro (loan)	2013	Série B	2	0	10 (Note: Appearance(s) in Campeonato Mineiro)	1	2	0	—		—		14	1
Tombense	2014	Campeonato Mineiro	—		10	0	2	0	—		—		12	0
América RN (loan)	2014	Série B	32	1	—		—		—		—		32	1
Fortaleza (loan)	2015	Série C	4	0	12 (Note: Appearance(s) in Campeonato Cearense)	0	3	1	—		8 (Note: Appearance(s) in Copa do Nordeste)	1	27	2
Daejeon Hana Citizen (loan)	2015	K League 1	15	6	—		—		—		—		15	6
Daejeon Hana Citizen (loan)	2016	K League 2	18	5	—		1	1	—		—		19	6
Daejeon Hana Citizen (loan)	Total		33	11	—		1	1	—		—		34	12
Jeju United (loan)	2016	K League 1	14	4	—		—		—		—		14	4
Atlético Goianiense	2017	Série A	0	0	12 (Note: Appearance(s) in Campeonato Goiano)	1	—		—		—		12	1
Pohang Steelers (loan)	2017	K League 1	19	1	—		—		—		—		19	1
Jeonnam Dragons (loan)	2018	K League 1	33	4	—		2	0	—		—		35	4
Pohang Steelers	2019	K League 1	38	15	—		—		—		—		38	15
Ittihad Kalba	2019-20	UAE Pro League	6	0	—		—		—		—		6	0
Ittihad Kalba	2020-21	UAE Pro League	20	1	—		—		—		4 (Note: Appearance(s) in UAE League Cup)	0	24	1
Ittihad Kalba	2021-22	UAE Pro League	0	0	—		—		—		1	0	1	0
Ittihad Kalba	Total		26	1	—		—		—		5	0	31	1
Pohang Steelers	2022	K League 1	27	2	—		1	0	—		—		28	2
Pohang Steelers	2023	K League 1	20	2	—		1	0	1 (Note: Appearance(s) in AFC Champions League)	0	—		22	2
Pohang Steelers	2024	K League 1	5	0	—		—		2	0	—		7	0
Pohang Steelers	Total		52	4	—		2	0	3	0	—		57	4
Career Total			296	44	45	2	14	2	3	0	5	0	363	48
