= 2016 K3 League =

K3 League
- Season: 2016
- Dates: 19 March – 12 November 2016
- Champions: FC Pocheon (5th title)
- Matches: 198
- Goals: 636 (3.21 per match)
- Best player: Jang Won-seok
- Top goalscorer: Kim Seong-min (17 goals)
- Best goalkeeper: Choi An-seong

The 2016 K3 League was the tenth season of the amateur K3 League.

Before the start of the 2016 season, Seoul FC Martyrs withdrew from the league, while Buyeo FC, Siheung Citizen and Yangpyeong FC joined the league.

The top five teams of the regular season qualified for the championship playoffs, and the winners of the regular season advanced to the final directly.

On the other hand, eight of the participating teams were relegated to the K3 League Basic, which was founded as the second division of the K3 League in 2017. The bottom five teams of the regular season were directly relegated, and three losing teams were additionally relegated after the relegation playoffs, contested between the four teams placed 12th to 15th.

== Teams ==
Club	City	Stadium	Manager
Buyeo FC	Buyeo	Buyeo Stadium	(South Korea) Kang Jeong-hoon
Cheongju City	Cheongju	Heungdeok Football Park	(South Korea) Seo Won-sang
Chungbuk Cheongju	Cheongju	Cheongju Stadium	(South Korea) Kim Jong-hyun
Chuncheon FC	Chuncheon	Chuncheon Stadium	(South Korea) Kim Yong-Ho
Gimpo Citizen	Gimpo	Gimpo City Stadium	(South Korea) Yoo Jong-wan
Goyang Citizen	Goyang	Goyang Eoulimnuri ground	(South Korea) Kim Jin-ok
Gyeongju Citizen	Gyeongju	Gyeongju Civic Stadium	(South Korea) Kim Jin-hyung
Hwaseong FC	Hwaseong	Hwaseong Stadium	(South Korea) Kim Jong-boo
Icheon Citizen	Icheon	Icheon City Stadium	(South Korea) Lee Hyun-chang
Jeonju FC	Jeonju	Jeonju University ground	(South Korea) Yang Young-cheol
Jungnang Chorus Mustang	Seoul	Jungnang Public Ground	(South Korea) Yoo Bong-ki
Paju Citizen	Paju	Paju Public Stadium	(South Korea) Oh Won-jae
Pyeongchang FC	Pyeongchang	Pyeongchang Stadium	(South Korea) Hwang Young-woo
FC Pocheon	Pocheon	Pocheon Stadium	(South Korea) In Chang-soo
Siheung Citizen	Siheung	Siheung Stadium	(Spain) Kike Linero
Seoul United	Seoul	Madeul Stadium	(South Korea) Kim Chang-kyum
FC Uijeongbu	Uijeongbu	Uijeongbu Stadium	(South Korea) Kim Hee-tae
Yangju Citizen	Yangju	Yangju Stadium	(South Korea) Lee Seung-hee
Yangpyeong FC	Yangpyeong	Yangpyeong Stadium	(South Korea) Cha Seung-yong
Yeonggwang FC	Yeonggwang	Yeonggwang Sportium	(South Korea) Kim Han-bong

== Regular season ==
Pos	Team	Pld	W	D	L	GF	GA	GD	Pts	Qualification or relegation
1	FC Pocheon (C)	19	16	2	1	52	14	+38	50	Qualification for the Championship final
2	Gimpo Citizen	19	16	1	2	46	14	+32	49	Qualification for the Championship first round
3	Cheongju City	19	15	1	3	42	12	+30	46	Qualification for the Championship first round
4	Yangju Citizen	19	12	4	3	46	31	+15	40	Qualification for the Championship first round
5	Jeonju FC	19	11	4	4	36	24	+12	37	Qualification for the Championship first round
6	Icheon Citizen	19	11	3	5	53	24	+29	36	
7	Paju Citizen	19	10	4	5	47	24	+23	34	
8	Chuncheon FC	19	10	2	7	23	18	+5	32	
9	Hwaseong FC	19	9	4	6	37	26	+11	31	
10	Gyeongju Citizen	19	9	3	7	32	24	+8	30	
11	Yangpyeong FC	19	8	6	5	34	26	+8	30	
12	Siheung Citizen (R)	19	8	2	9	32	40	−8	26	Qualification for the relegation playoffs
13	Jungnang Chorus Mustang (R)	19	6	4	9	25	27	−2	22	Qualification for the relegation playoffs
14	Pyeongchang FC (R)	19	5	3	11	18	39	−21	18	Qualification for the relegation playoffs
15	Chungbuk Cheongju	19	5	2	12	20	33	−13	17	Qualification for the relegation playoffs
16	Buyeo FC (R)	19	3	5	11	18	32	−14	14	Relegation to the K3 League Basic
17	Seoul United (R)	19	3	3	13	26	53	−27	12	Relegation to the K3 League Basic
18	Yeonggwang FC (R)	19	2	2	15	16	53	−37	8	Relegation to the K3 League Basic
19	Goyang Citizen (R)	19	1	3	15	20	58	−38	6	Relegation to the K3 League Basic
20	FC Uijeongbu (R)	19	1	0	18	13	64	−51	3	Relegation to the K3 League Basic

Source: JoinKFA Soccerway
Rules for classification: 1) Points; 2) Goal difference; 3) Goals scored.
(C) Champions; (R) Relegated

== Relegation playoffs ==
=== Bracket ===
Semifinals
12	Siheung Citizen	1
15	Chungbuk Cheongju	2
13	Jungnang Chorus Mustang	0
14	Pyeongchang FC	1

Finals
Chungbuk Cheongju	3
Pyeongchang FC	1

== Championship playoffs ==
When the first round and semi-final matches were finished as draws, their winners were decided on the regular season rankings without extra time and the penalty shoot-out.

=== Bracket ===
First round
2	Gimpo Citizen	0
5	Jeonju FC	1
3	Cheongju City	1
4	Yangju Citizen	1

Semi-final
5	Jeonju FC	1
3	Cheongju City	1

Final
FC Pocheon	0	4	4
Cheongju City	0	2	2

=== First round ===
22 October 2016

Gimpo Citizen	0–1	Jeonju FC

Gimpo Stadium, Gimpo

22 October 2016

Cheongju City	1–1	Yangju Citizen

Heungdeok Soccer Park, Cheongju

=== Semi-final ===
29 October 2016

Cheongju City	1–1	Jeonju FC

Heungdeok Soccer Park, Cheongju

=== Final ===
6 November 2016

Cheongju City	0–0	FC Pocheon

Heungdeok Soccer Park, Cheongju

12 November 2016

FC Pocheon	4–2	Cheongju City

Pocheon Stadium, Pocheon

FC Pocheon won 4–2 on aggregate.

== See also ==
- 2016 in South Korean football
- 2016 Korean FA Cup
