= 2017 in South Korean football =

Football in South Korea
- Season: 2017

Men's football
- K League Classic: Jeonbuk Hyundai Motors
- K League Challenge: Gyeongnam FC
- National League: Gyeongju KHNP
- K3 League Advanced: Pocheon Citizen
- K3 League Basic: Jungnang Chorus Mustang
- Korean FA Cup: Ulsan Hyundai

Women's football
- WK League: Incheon Hyundai Steel Red Angels

This article shows a summary of the 2017 football season in South Korea.

== National teams ==
=== FIFA World Cup qualification ===
23 March AFC third round, Group A	China	1–0	South Korea	Changsha, China
19:35 UTC+8	Yu Dabao 34'	Report		Stadium: Helong Stadium; Attendance: 30,950; Referee: Peter Green (Australia)

28 March AFC third round, Group A	South Korea	1–0	Syria	Seoul, South Korea
20:00 UTC+9	Hong Jeong-ho 4'	Report		Stadium: Seoul World Cup Stadium; Attendance: 30,352; Referee: Adham Makhadmeh (Jordan)

13 June AFC third round, Group A	Qatar	3–2	South Korea	Doha, Qatar
22:00 UTC+3	Al-Haidos 25', 75'; Afif 51'	Report	Ki Sung-yueng 62'; Hwang Hee-chan 70'	Stadium: Jassim Bin Hamad Stadium; Attendance: 5,373; Referee: Hettikamkanamge Perera (Sri Lanka)

31 August AFC third round, Group A	South Korea	0–0	Iran	Seoul, South Korea
21:00 UTC+9		Report		Stadium: Seoul World Cup Stadium; Attendance: 63,124; Referee: Peter Green (Australia)

5 September AFC third round, Group A	Uzbekistan	0–0	South Korea	Tashkent, Uzbekistan
20:00 UTC+5		Report		Stadium: Bunyodkor Stadium; Attendance: 34,000; Referee: Muhammad Taqi (Singapore)

AFC third round, Group A table
Pos	Team	Pld	W	D	L	GF	GA	GD	Pts	Qualification
1	Iran	10	6	4	0	10	2	+8	22	Qualification for World Cup
2	South Korea	10	4	3	3	11	10	+1	15	Qualification for World Cup
3	Syria	10	3	4	3	9	8	+1	13	Advance to AFC fourth round
4	Uzbekistan	10	4	1	5	6	7	−1	13	
5	China	10	3	3	4	8	10	−2	12	
6	Qatar	10	2	1	7	8	15	−7	7	

Source: FIFA
Rules for classification: Tiebreakers

=== EAFF Championship ===
9 December	South Korea	2–2	China	Chōfu, Japan
16:30 UTC+9	Kim Shin-wook 12'; Lee Jae-sung 19'	Report	Wei Shihao 9'; Yu Dabao 76'	Stadium: Ajinomoto Stadium; Attendance: 9,103; Referee: Khamis Al-Marri (Qatar)

12 December	South Korea	1–0	North Korea	Chōfu, Japan
16:30 UTC+9	Ri Yong-chol 64' (o.g.)	Report		Stadium: Ajinomoto Stadium; Attendance: 5,477; Referee: Hettikamkanamge Perera (Sri Lanka)

16 December	Japan	1–4	South Korea	Chōfu, Japan
19:15 UTC+9	Yu Kobayashi 3' (pen.)	Report	Kim Shin-wook 13', 35'; Jung Woo-young 23'; Yeom Ki-hun 69'	Stadium: Ajinomoto Stadium; Attendance: 36,645; Referee: Chris Beath (Australia)

Pos	Team	Pld	W	D	L	GF	GA	GD	Pts
1	South Korea (C)	3	2	1	0	7	3	+4	7
2	Japan (H)	3	2	0	1	4	5	−1	6
3	China	3	0	2	1	4	5	−1	2
4	North Korea	3	0	1	2	1	3	−2	1

Source: EAFF
(C) Champions; (H) Hosts

=== AFC U-23 Championship qualification ===
19 July Group I	South Korea	10–0	Macau	Ho Chi Minh City, Vietnam
16:00 (UTC+7)	Cho Young-wook 10', 14', 25', 55'; Hwang In-beom 29'; Doo Hyeon-seok 48'; Park Seong-bu 53' (pen.), 78'; Jo Sung-wook 64'; Park Jae-woo 90+3'	Report		Stadium: Thống Nhất Stadium; Attendance: 1,000; Referee: Aziz Asimov (Uzbekistan)

21 July Group I	Timor-Leste	0–0	South Korea	Ho Chi Minh City, Vietnam
16:00 (UTC+7)		Report		Stadium: Thống Nhất Stadium; Attendance: 2,500; Referee: Khurram Shahzad (Pakistan)

23 July Group I	South Korea	2–1	Vietnam	Ho Chi Minh City, Vietnam
19:00 (UTC+7)	Lee Sang-heon 19'; Hwang In-beom 41'	Report	Công Phượng 33'	Stadium: Thống Nhất Stadium; Attendance: 18,000; Referee: Masoud Tufayelieh (Syria)

Group I table
Pos	Team	Pld	W	D	L	GF	GA	GD	Pts	Qualification
1	South Korea	3	2	1	0	12	1	+11	7	Qualification for AFC U-23 Championship
2	Vietnam (H)	3	2	0	1	13	3	+10	6	Qualification for AFC U-23 Championship
3	Timor-Leste	3	1	1	1	7	5	+2	4	
4	Macau	3	0	0	3	2	25	−23	0	

Source: AFC
Rules for classification: Tiebreakers
(H) Hosts

=== Friendlies ===
==== Senior team ====
7 June	South Korea	0–0	Iraq	Ras Al Khaimah, United Arab Emirates
21:00 UTC+4		Report		Stadium: Emirates Club Stadium; Attendance: 1,000; Referee: Yaqoub Al Hammadi (United Arab Emirates)

7 October	Russia	4–2	South Korea	Moscow, Russia
17:00 UTC+3	Smolov 44'; Kim Ju-young 55', 57' (o.g.); Miranchuk 83'	Report	Kwon Kyung-won 87'; Ji Dong-won 90+3'	Stadium: VEB Arena; Attendance: 24,200; Referee: Viktor Kassai (Hungary)

10 October	South Korea	1–3	Morocco	Biel/Bienne, Switzerland
15:30 UTC+2	Son Heung-min 66' (pen.)	Report	Tannane 7', 11'; Haddad 46'	Stadium: Tissot Arena; Attendance: 2,000; Referee: Alain Bieri (Switzerland)

10 November	South Korea	2–1	Colombia	Suwon, South Korea
20:00 UTC+9	Son Heung-min 11', 61'	Report	Zapata 76'	Stadium: Suwon World Cup Stadium; Attendance: 29,750; Referee: Chris Beath (Australia)

14 November	South Korea	1–1	Serbia	Ulsan, South Korea
20:00 UTC+9	Koo Ja-cheol 62' (pen.)	Report	Ljajić 59'	Stadium: Ulsan Munsu Football Stadium; Attendance: 30,560; Referee: Ma Ning (China)

== Leagues ==
=== K League Classic ===
Pos	Team	Pld	W	D	L	GF	GA	GD	Pts	Qualification or relegation
1	Jeonbuk Hyundai Motors (C)	38	22	9	7	73	35	+38	75	Qualification for Champions League group stage
2	Jeju United	38	19	9	10	60	37	+23	66	Qualification for Champions League group stage
3	Suwon Samsung Bluewings	38	17	13	8	63	41	+22	64	Qualification for Champions League playoff round
4	Ulsan Hyundai	38	17	11	10	42	45	−3	62	Qualification for Champions League group stage (Note: Qualified as champions of FA Cup.)
5	FC Seoul	38	16	13	9	56	42	+14	61	
6	Gangwon FC	38	13	10	15	59	65	−6	49	
7	Pohang Steelers	38	15	7	16	63	60	+3	52	
8	Daegu FC	38	11	14	13	50	52	−2	47	
9	Incheon United	38	7	18	13	32	53	−21	39	
10	Jeonnam Dragons	38	8	11	19	53	69	−16	35	
11	Sangju Sangmu (O)	38	8	11	19	41	66	−25	35	Qualification for relegation playoffs
12	Gwangju FC (R)	38	6	12	20	33	60	−27	30	Relegation to K League 2

Source: K League
Rules for classification: 1) Points; 2) Goals scored; 3) Goal difference; 4) Wins; 5) Head-to-head points
(C) Champions; (O) Play-off winners; (R) Relegated

=== K League Challenge ===
==== Regular season ====
Pos	Team	Pld	W	D	L	GF	GA	GD	Pts	Qualification
1	Gyeongnam FC (C, P)	36	24	7	5	69	36	+33	79	Promotion to K League 1
2	Busan IPark	36	19	11	6	52	30	+22	68	Qualification for promotion playoffs semi-final
3	Asan Mugunghwa	36	15	9	12	44	37	+7	54	Qualification for promotion playoffs first round
4	Seongnam FC	36	13	14	9	38	30	+8	53	Qualification for promotion playoffs first round
5	Bucheon FC 1995	36	15	7	14	50	46	+4	52	
6	Suwon FC	36	11	12	13	42	48	−6	45	
7	FC Anyang	36	10	9	17	40	58	−18	39	
8	Seoul E-Land	36	7	14	15	42	55	−13	35	
9	Ansan Greeners	36	7	12	17	36	54	−18	33	
10	Daejeon Citizen	36	6	11	19	41	60	−19	29	

Source: K League
Rules for classification: 1) Points; 2) Goals scored; 3) Goal difference; 4) Wins; 5) Head-to-head points
(C) Champions; (P) Promoted

==== Promotion playoffs ====
Sangju Sangmu remains in the K League Classic.

First round
3	Asan Mugunghwa	1
4	Seongnam FC	0

Semi-final
2	Busan IPark	3
3	Asan Mugunghwa	0

Final
Busan IPark	0	1	1 (4)
Sangju Sangmu (p)	1	0	1 (5)

=== Korea National League ===
==== Regular season ====
Pos	Team	Pld	W	D	L	GF	GA	GD	Pts	Qualification or relegation
1	Gyeongju KHNP (C)	28	14	9	5	39	21	+18	51	Qualification for playoffs final
2	Gimhae City	28	12	14	2	38	21	+17	50	Qualification for playoffs semi-final
3	Cheonan City	28	15	4	9	37	33	+4	49	Qualification for playoffs semi-final
4	Daejeon Korail	28	10	9	9	31	34	−3	39	
5	Mokpo City	28	8	11	9	35	35	0	35	
6	Changwon City	28	7	8	13	33	36	−3	29	
7	Gangneung City	28	6	8	14	35	47	−12	26	
8	Busan Transportation Corporation	28	5	7	16	22	43	−21	22	

Source: Korea National League
Rules for classification: 1) Points; 2) Goal difference; 3) Goals scored
(C) Champions

==== Championship playoffs ====
Semi-final					Final
2	Gimhae City	2	1	3
3	Cheonan City	2	0	2
3	Cheonan City	2	0	2		Gimhae City	1	0	1
					1	Gyeongju KHNP	0	2	2

=== K3 League Advanced ===
==== Regular season ====
Pos	Team	Pld	W	D	L	GF	GA	GD	Pts	Qualification or relegation
1	Pocheon Citizen (C)	22	12	8	2	31	19	+12	44	Qualification for Championship final
2	Cheongju City	22	8	11	3	33	23	+10	35	Qualification for Championship first round
3	Hwaseong FC	22	9	8	5	30	26	+4	35	Qualification for Championship first round
4	Yangpyeong FC	22	11	2	9	25	28	−3	35	Qualification for Championship first round
5	Gimpo Citizen	22	9	6	7	28	26	+2	33	Qualification for Championship first round
6	Icheon Citizen	22	9	5	8	43	32	+11	32	
7	Chungbuk Cheongju	22	7	9	6	18	19	−1	30	
8	Gyeongju Citizen	22	7	5	10	36	36	0	26	
9	Jeonju FC	22	7	5	10	30	36	−6	26	
10	Chuncheon FC	22	7	3	12	23	29	−6	24	
11	Paju Citizen (R)	22	6	6	10	22	31	−9	24	Relegation to K3 League Basic
12	Yangju Citizen (R)	22	4	4	14	33	47	−14	16	Relegation to K3 League Basic

Source: KFA Soccerway
Rules for classification: 1) Points; 2) Goal difference; 3) Goals scored
(C) Champions; (R) Relegated

==== Championship playoffs ====
When the first round and semi-final matches were finished as draws, their winners were decided on the regular season rankings without extra time and the penalty shoot-out.

First round
2	Cheongju City	3
5	Gimpo Citizen	3
3	Hwaseong FC	1
4	Yangpyeong FC	1

Semi-final
2	Cheongju City	0
3	Hwaseong FC	0

Final
Pocheon Citizen (a.e.t.)	0	2	2
Cheongju City	1	0	1

=== K3 League Basic ===
==== Regular season ====
Pos	Team	Pld	W	D	L	GF	GA	GD	Pts	Promotion or qualification
1	Jungnang Chorus Mustang (C, P)	16	12	4	0	43	12	+31	40	Promotion to K3 League Advanced
2	Siheung Citizen	16	13	0	3	32	17	+15	39	Qualification for promotion playoffs
3	Pyeongtaek G-SMATT (O, P)	16	8	3	5	38	26	+12	27	Qualification for promotion playoffs
4	Buyeo FC	16	8	3	5	23	18	+5	27	Qualification for promotion playoffs
5	FC Uijeongbu	16	8	0	8	35	25	+10	24	Qualification for promotion playoffs
6	Busan FC	16	6	3	7	34	35	−1	21	
7	Pyeongchang FC	16	5	3	8	27	29	−2	18	
8	Goyang Citizen	16	2	2	12	16	41	−25	8	
9	Seoul United	16	0	2	14	19	64	−45	2	

Source: KFA
Rules for classification: 1) Points; 2) Goal difference; 3) Goals scored
(C) Champions; (O) Play-off winners; (P) Promoted

==== Promotion playoffs ====
When a match was finished as a draw, its winners were decided on the regular season rankings without extra time and the penalty shoot-out.

Semi-finals
2 Siheung Citizen	1
5 FC Uijeongbu	2
3 Pyeongtaek G-SMATT	3
4 Buyeo FC	0

Final
5 FC Uijeongbu	2
3 Pyeongtaek G-SMATT	2

=== WK League ===
==== Regular season ====
Pos	Team	Pld	W	D	L	GF	GA	GD	Pts	Qualification
1	Incheon Hyundai Steel Red Angels (C)	28	22	4	2	88	18	+70	70	Qualification for playoffs final
2	Icheon Daekyo	28	16	5	7	51	34	+17	53	Qualification for playoffs semi-final
3	Hwacheon KSPO	28	13	7	8	45	50	−5	46	Qualification for playoffs semi-final
4	Seoul WFC	28	12	5	11	40	43	−3	41	
5	Suwon FMC	28	9	10	9	39	38	+1	37	
6	Gumi Sportstoto	28	8	7	13	34	43	−9	31	
7	Gyeongju KHNP	28	5	6	17	23	53	−30	21	
8	Boeun Sangmu	28	3	4	21	22	63	−41	13	

Source: Soccerway
(C) Champions

==== Championship playoffs ====
Semi-final			Final
			1	Incheon Hyundai Steel Red Angels	3	3	6
2	Icheon Daekyo	1		Hwacheon KSPO	0	0	0
3	Hwacheon KSPO	2

== Domestic cups ==
=== Korean FA Cup ===
Round of 32
Jeonbuk Hyundai Motors	0 (2)
Bucheon FC 1995 (p)	0 (4)
Sangju Sangmu	1
Gangneung City	0
Gyeongnam FC	2
Daegu FC	1
Ulsan Hyundai	3
Chuncheon FC	1
Gangwon FC	1
Daejeon Korail	0
Seongnam FC	3
Cheongju City	1
Gyeongju KHNP	0
Pocheon Citizen	2
Mokpo City	1
Yangpyeong FC	0
Daejeon Citizen	2
Yeungnam University	0
Jeonnam Dragons	4
Jeonju Citizen	0
FC Seoul	2
FC Anyang	0
Busan IPark (a.e.t.)	1
Pohang Steelers	0
Gwangju FC (a.e.t.)	4
Yonsei University	2
Asan Mugunghwa	2
Ajou University	1
Jeju United	1
Gimhae City	0
Incheon United	0
Suwon Samsung Bluewings	1

Round of 16
Bucheon FC 1995	0
Sangju Sangmu	2
Gyeongnam FC	1
Ulsan Hyundai	2
Gangwon FC	0
Seongnam FC	1
Pocheon Citizen	0
Mokpo City	1
Daejeon Citizen	1
Jeonnam Dragons	2
FC Seoul	0 (7)
Busan IPark (p)	0 (8)
Gwangju FC	3
Asan Mugunghwa	0
Jeju United	0
Suwon Samsung Bluewings	2

Quarter-finals
Sangju Sangmu	1
Ulsan Hyundai	3
Seongnam FC	0
Mokpo City	3
Jeonnam Dragons	1
Busan IPark	3
Gwangju FC	1
Suwon Samsung Bluewings (a.e.t.)	2

Semi-finals
27 September – Ulsan
Ulsan Hyundai	1
Mokpo City	0
25 October – Busan
Busan IPark (p)	1 (4)
Suwon Samsung Bluewings	1 (2)

Final
29 November, 3 December
Ulsan Hyundai	2	0	2
Busan IPark	1	0	1

=== Korea National League Championship ===
==== Group stage ====
Group A
Pos	Team	Pld	Pts
1	Cheonan City	3	5
2	Changwon City	3	4
3	Gimhae City	3	4
4	Mokpo City	3	2

Group B
Pos	Team	Pld	Pts
1	Gyeongju KHNP	3	7
2	Daejeon Korail	3	6
3	Busan Transportation Corporation	3	3
4	Gangneung City	3	1

==== Knockout stage ====
Semi-finals
A1	Cheonan City (p)	1 (7)
B2	Daejeon Korail	1 (6)
B1	Gyeongju KHNP	1 (2)
A2	Changwon City (p)	1 (4)

Final
Cheonan City	2 (3)
Changwon City (p)	2 (4)

== International cups ==
=== AFC Champions League ===
Team	Result	Round	Aggregate	Score	Venue	Opponent
FC Seoul	Group stage	Group F	Third place	0–1	Home	(China) Shanghai SIPG
FC Seoul	Group stage	Group F	Third place	2–4	Away	(China) Shanghai SIPG
FC Seoul	Group stage	Group F	Third place	2–5	Away	(Japan) Urawa Red Diamonds
FC Seoul	Group stage	Group F	Third place	1–0	Home	(Japan) Urawa Red Diamonds
FC Seoul	Group stage	Group F	Third place	2–3	Home	(Australia) Western Sydney Wanderers
FC Seoul	Group stage	Group F	Third place	3–2	Away	(Australia) Western Sydney Wanderers
Jeju United	Round of 16	Group H	Runners-up	0–1	Home	(China) Jiangsu Suning
Jeju United	Round of 16	Group H	Runners-up	2–1	Away	(China) Jiangsu Suning
Jeju United	Round of 16	Group H	Runners-up	4–1	Away	(Japan) Gamba Osaka
Jeju United	Round of 16	Group H	Runners-up	2–0	Home	(Japan) Gamba Osaka
Jeju United	Round of 16	Group H	Runners-up	3–3	Away	(Australia) Adelaide United
Jeju United	Round of 16	Group H	Runners-up	1–3	Home	(Australia) Adelaide United
Jeju United	Round of 16	Round of 16	2–3	2–0	Home	(Japan) Urawa Red Diamonds
Jeju United	Round of 16	Round of 16	2–3	0–3 (a.e.t.)	Away	(Japan) Urawa Red Diamonds
Suwon Samsung Bluewings	Group stage	Group G	Third place	1–1	Away	(Japan) Kawasaki Frontale
Suwon Samsung Bluewings	Group stage	Group G	Third place	0–1	Home	(Japan) Kawasaki Frontale
Suwon Samsung Bluewings	Group stage	Group G	Third place	2–2	Home	(China) Guangzhou Evergrande
Suwon Samsung Bluewings	Group stage	Group G	Third place	2–2	Away	(China) Guangzhou Evergrande
Suwon Samsung Bluewings	Group stage	Group G	Third place	1–0	Away	(Hong Kong) Eastern
Suwon Samsung Bluewings	Group stage	Group G	Third place	5–0	Home	(Hong Kong) Eastern
Ulsan Hyundai	Group stage	Qualifying play-offs	1–1 (4–3 p)	1–1 (a.e.t.)	—	(Hong Kong) Kitchee
Ulsan Hyundai	Group stage	Group E	Third place	0–2	Away	(Japan) Kashima Antlers
Ulsan Hyundai	Group stage	Group E	Third place	0–4	Home	(Japan) Kashima Antlers
Ulsan Hyundai	Group stage	Group E	Third place	6–0	Home	(Australia) Brisbane Roar
Ulsan Hyundai	Group stage	Group E	Third place	3–2	Away	(Australia) Brisbane Roar
Ulsan Hyundai	Group stage	Group E	Third place	0–0	Home	(Thailand) Muangthong United
Ulsan Hyundai	Group stage	Group E	Third place	0–1	Away	(Thailand) Muangthong United

== See also ==
- Football in South Korea
