= 2016 in South Korean football =

Football in South Korea
- Season: 2016

Men's football
- K League Classic: FC Seoul
- K League Challenge: Asan Mugunghwa
- National League: Gangneung City
- K3 League: Pocheon Citizen
- Korean FA Cup: Suwon Samsung Bluewings

Women's football
- WK League: Incheon Hyundai Steel Red Angels

This article shows a summary of the 2016 football season in South Korea.

== National teams ==
=== FIFA World Cup qualification ===
24 March AFC second round, Group G	South Korea	1–0	Lebanon	Ansan, South Korea
20:00 KST	Lee Jeong-hyeop 90+3'	Report (FIFA); Report (AFC)		Stadium: Ansan Wa~ Stadium; Attendance: 30,532; Referee: Ma Ning (China)

29 March AFC second round, Group G	South Korea	3–0; Awarded	Kuwait	South Korea
00:00 KST		Report

AFC second round, Group G table
Pos	Team	Pld	W	D	L	GF	GA	GD	Pts	Qualification
1	South Korea	8	8	0	0	27	0	+27	24	Advance to AFC third round
2	Lebanon	8	3	2	3	12	6	+6	11	
3	Kuwait	8	3	1	4	12	10	+2	10	
4	Myanmar	8	2	2	4	9	21	−12	8	
5	Laos	8	1	1	6	6	29	−23	4	

Source: FIFA
Rules for classification: Tiebreakers

1 September AFC third round, Group A	South Korea	3–2	China	Seoul, South Korea
20:00 UTC+9	Zheng Zhi 20' (o.g.); Lee Chung-yong 62'; Koo Ja-cheol 66'	Report (FIFA)	Yu Hai 73'; Hao Junmin 76'	Stadium: Seoul World Cup Stadium; Attendance: 51,238; Referee: Mohammed Abdulla Hassan Mohamed (United Arab Emirates)

6 September AFC third round, Group A	South Korea	0–0	Syria	Seremban, Malaysia
20:00 UTC+8		Report (FIFA)		Stadium: Tuanku Abdul Rahman Stadium; Attendance: 4,350; Referee: Chris Beath (Australia)

6 October AFC third round, Group A	South Korea	3–2	Qatar	Suwon, South Korea
20:00 UTC+9	Ki Sung-yueng 11'; Ji Dong-won 56'; Son Heung-min 58'	Report (FIFA)	Al-Haidos 16' (pen.); Soria 45'	Stadium: Suwon World Cup Stadium; Attendance: 32,550; Referee: Mohd Amirul Izwan Yaacob (Malaysia)

11 October AFC third round, Group A	Iran	1–0	South Korea	Tehran, Iran
18:15 UTC+3:30	Azmoun 25'	Report (FIFA)		Stadium: Azadi Stadium; Attendance: 75,800; Referee: Ryuji Sato (Japan)

15 November AFC third round, Group A	South Korea	2–1	Uzbekistan	Seoul, South Korea
20:00 UTC+9	Nam Tae-hee 67'; Koo Ja-cheol 85'	Report (FIFA)	Bikmaev 25'	Stadium: Seoul World Cup Stadium; Attendance: 30,526; Referee: Fahad Al-Mirdasi (Saudi Arabia)

=== AFC U-23 Championship ===
13 January Group C	South Korea	2–1	Uzbekistan	Doha, Qatar
19:30 AST (UTC+03)	Moon Chang-jin 20' (pen.), 48'	Report	Dostonbek Khamdamov 57'	Stadium: Suheim Bin Hamad Stadium; Attendance: 803; Referee: Fahad Al-Mirdasi (KSA)

16 January Group C	Yemen	0–5	South Korea	Doha, Qatar
16:30 AST (UTC+03)		Report	Kwon Chang-hoon 14', 31', 41'; Ryu Seung-woo 72'; Kim Seung-jun 76'	Stadium: Suheim Bin Hamad Stadium; Attendance: 686; Referee: Dmitriy Mashentsev (KGZ)

19 January Group C	Iraq	1–1	South Korea	Doha, Qatar
19:30 AST (UTC+03)	Walid 90+2'	Report	Kim Hyun 22'	Stadium: Suheim Bin Hamad Stadium; Attendance: 1,086; Referee: Abdulrahman Al-Jassim (QAT)

Group C table
Pos	Team	Pld	W	D	L	GF	GA	GD	Pts	Qualification
1	South Korea	3	2	1	0	8	2	+6	7	Advance to knockout stage
2	Iraq	3	2	1	0	6	3	+3	7	Advance to knockout stage
3	Uzbekistan	3	1	0	2	6	6	0	3	
4	Yemen	3	0	0	3	1	10	−9	0	

Source: AFC
Rules for classification: Tiebreakers

23 January Quarter-finals	South Korea	1–0	Jordan	Doha, Qatar
16:30 AST (UTC+03)	Moon Chang-jin 23'	Report		Stadium: Suheim Bin Hamad Stadium; Attendance: 3,126; Referee: Alireza Faghani (IRN)

26 January Semi-finals	Qatar	1–3	South Korea	Doha, Qatar
19:30 AST (UTC+03)	Alaa 79'	Report	Ryu Seung-woo 48'; Kwon Chang-hoon 89'; Moon Chang-jin 90+4'	Stadium: Jassim Bin Hamad Stadium; Attendance: 11,840; Referee: Crishantha Dilan Perera (SRI)

30 January Final	South Korea	2–3	Japan	Doha, Qatar
17:45 AST (UTC+03)	Kwon Chang-hoon 20'; Jin Seong-uk 47'	Report	Asano 66', 81'; Yajima 68'	Stadium: Abdullah bin Khalifa Stadium; Attendance: 5,394; Referee: Abdulrahman Al-Jassim (QAT)

=== Summer Olympics ===
4 August Group C	Fiji	0–8	South Korea	Salvador, Brazil
17:00 UTC−3		Report (Rio2016); Report (FIFA)	Ryu Seung-woo 32', 63', 90+3'; Kwon Chang-hoon 62', 63'; Son Heung-min 72' (pen.); Suk Hyun-jun 77', 90'	Stadium: Itaipava Arena Fonte Nova; Attendance: 16,000; Referee: Malang Diedhiou (Senegal)

7 August Group C	Germany	3–3	South Korea	Salvador, Brazil
16:00 UTC−3	Gnabry 33', 90+2'; Selke 55'	Report (Rio2016); Report (FIFA)	Hwang Hee-chan 25'; Son Heung-min 57'; Suk Hyun-jun 87'	Stadium: Itaipava Arena Fonte Nova; Referee: Néstor Pitana (Argentina)

10 August Group C	South Korea	1–0	Mexico	Brasília, Brazil
16:00 UTC−3	Kwon Chang-hoon 73'	Report (Rio2016); Report (FIFA)		Stadium: Estádio Nacional Mané Garrincha

Group C table
Pos	Team	Pld	W	D	L	GF	GA	GD	Pts	Qualification
1	South Korea	3	2	1	0	12	3	+9	7	Advance to knockout stage
2	Germany	3	1	2	0	15	5	+10	5	Advance to knockout stage
3	Mexico	3	1	1	1	7	4	+3	4	
4	Fiji	3	0	0	3	1	23	−22	0	

Source: Rio2016 FIFA
Rules for classification: Tiebreakers

13 August Quarter-finals	South Korea	0–1	Honduras	Belo Horizonte, Brazil
19:00 UTC−3		Report (Rio2016); Report (FIFA)	Elis 59'	Stadium: Mineirão; Attendance: 36,704; Referee: Gehad Grisha (Egypt)

=== Friendlies ===
==== Senior team ====
27 March	Thailand	0–1	South Korea	Bangkok, Thailand
21:30 KST		Report	Suk Hyun-jun 4'	Stadium: Suphachalasai Stadium

1 June	South Korea	1–6	Spain	Salzburg, Austria
16:30 CEST	Ju Se-jong 83'	Report	Silva 30'; Fàbregas 32'; Nolito 38', 54'; Morata 50', 89'	Stadium: Red Bull Arena; Referee: Harald Lechner (Austria)

5 June	Czech Republic	1–2	South Korea	Prague, Czech Republic
15:10 CEST	Suchý 46'	Report	Yoon Bit-garam 26'; Suk Hyun-jun 40'	Stadium: Eden Arena; Attendance: 16,490; Referee: Daniel Stefanski (Poland)

11 November	South Korea	2–0	Canada	Cheonan, South Korea
20:00 UTC+9	Kim Bo-kyung 10'; Lee Jeong-hyeop 25'	Report		Stadium: Cheonan Stadium; Attendance: 18,920; Referee: Ma Ning (China)

==== Under-23 team ====
4 January	United Arab Emirates	0–2	South Korea	Dubai, United Arab Emirates
18:20 AST (UTC+03)		Report	Lee Yeong-jae 61'; Hwang Hee-chan 88'	Stadium: Maktoum Bin Rashid Al Maktoum Stadium; Attendance: 400; Referee: Sultan Al Razaq (UAE)

7 January	Saudi Arabia	0–0	South Korea	Dubai, United Arab Emirates
18:20 AST (UTC+03)		Report		Stadium: Maktoum Bin Rashid Al Maktoum Stadium; Attendance: 350; Referee: Sultan Mohamed Saleh (UAE)

25 March	South Korea	2–0	Algeria	Icheon, South Korea
20:00 KST (UTC+09)	Kwon Chang-hoon 3'; Moon Chang-jin 30'	Report		Stadium: Icheon Stadium; Attendance: 11,752; Referee: Chen Hsin-chuan (Chinese Taipei)

28 March	South Korea	3–0	Algeria	Goyang, South Korea
19:00 KST (UTC+09)	Lee Chang-min 22'; Moon Chang-jin 59', 75'	Report		Stadium: Goyang Stadium; Attendance: 14,357; Referee: Ali Abdulnabi (Bahamas)

2 June	South Korea	1–0	Nigeria	Suwon, South Korea
20:00 KST (UTC+09)	Choi Kyu-baek 86'	Report		Stadium: Suwon World Cup Stadium; Attendance: 7,627; Referee: Masaaki Toma (Japan)

4 June	South Korea	2–2	Honduras	Goyang, South Korea
13:30 KST (UTC+09)	Kim Hyun 35'; Park In-hyeok 93'	Report	Lozano 22', 42'	Stadium: Goyang Stadium; Attendance: 4,315; Referee: Wang Di (China)

6 June	South Korea	1–1	Denmark	Bucheon, South Korea
20:00 KST (UTC+09)	Moon Chang-jin 40'	Report	Brock-Madsen 92'	Stadium: Bucheon Stadium; Attendance: 13,690; Referee: Masaaki Toma (Japan)

30 July	South Korea	3–2	Sweden	São Paulo, Brazil
20:00 UTC−2	Moon Chang-jin 38', 41'; Ryu Seung-woo 54'	Report	Sema 26'; Une Larsson 57'	Stadium: Pacaembu Stadium; Attendance: 11,256; Referee: Raphael Claus (Brazil)

== Leagues ==
=== K League Classic ===
Pos	Team	Pld	W	D	L	GF	GA	GD	Pts	Qualification or relegation
1	FC Seoul (C)	38	21	7	10	67	46	+21	70	Qualification for Champions League group stage
2	Jeonbuk Hyundai Motors (Note: Jeonbuk Hyundai Motors were deducted 9 points and were excluded from the next Champions League due to bribery scandal.)	38	20	16	2	71	40	+31	67	
3	Jeju United	38	17	8	13	71	57	+14	59	Qualification for Champions League group stage
4	Ulsan Hyundai	38	14	12	12	41	47	−6	54	Qualification for Champions League playoff round
5	Jeonnam Dragons	38	12	11	15	44	53	−9	47	
6	Sangju Sangmu	38	12	7	19	54	65	−11	43	
7	Suwon Samsung Bluewings	38	10	18	10	56	59	−3	48	Qualification for Champions League group stage (Note: Qualified as champions of FA Cup.)
8	Gwangju FC	38	11	14	13	41	45	−4	47	
9	Pohang Steelers	38	12	10	16	43	46	−3	46	
10	Incheon United	38	11	12	15	43	51	−8	45	
11	Seongnam FC (R)	38	11	10	17	47	51	−4	43	Qualification for relegation playoffs
12	Suwon FC (R)	38	10	9	19	40	58	−18	39	Relegation to K League Challenge

Source: K League
Rules for classification: 1) Points; 2) Goals scored; 3) Goal difference; 4) Wins; 5) Head-to-head points
(C) Champions; (R) Relegated

=== K League Challenge ===
==== Regular season ====
Pos	Team	Pld	W	D	L	GF	GA	GD	Pts	Qualification
1	Ansan Mugunghwa (Note: Ansan Mugunghwa lost its qualification for the promotion after Ansan Government decided to break up with Korean Police Agency.) (C)	40	21	7	12	57	55	+2	70	
2	Daegu FC (P)	40	19	13	8	53	36	+17	70	Promotion to K League Classic
3	Bucheon FC 1995	40	19	10	11	49	33	+16	67	Qualification for promotion playoffs semi-final
4	Gangwon FC (O, P)	40	19	9	12	50	33	+17	66	Qualification for promotion playoffs first round
5	Busan IPark	40	19	7	14	52	39	+13	64	Qualification for promotion playoffs first round
6	Seoul E-Land	40	17	13	10	47	35	+12	64	
7	Daejeon Citizen	40	15	10	15	56	52	+4	55	
8	Gyeongnam FC (Note: Gyeongnam FC were deducted 10 points due to bribery scandal.)	40	18	6	16	61	58	+3	50	
9	FC Anyang	40	11	13	16	40	53	−13	46	
10	Chungju Hummel	40	7	8	25	42	62	−20	29	
11	Goyang Zaicro	40	2	10	28	21	72	−51	16	

Source: K League
Rules for classification: 1) Points; 2) Goals scored; 3) Goal difference; 4) Wins; 5) Head-to-head points
(C) Champions; (O) Play-off winners; (P) Promoted

==== Promotion playoffs ====
Gangwon FC was promoted to the K League Classic, while Seongnam FC was relegated to the K League Challenge.

First round
4	Gangwon FC	1
5	Busan IPark	0

Semi-final
3	Bucheon FC 1995	1
4	Gangwon FC	2

Final
Gangwon FC (a)	0	1	1
Seongnam FC	0	1	1

=== Korea National League ===
==== Regular season ====
Pos	Team	Pld	W	D	L	GF	GA	GD	Pts	Qualification or relegation
1	Gangneung City	27	16	8	3	33	17	+16	56	Qualification for playoffs final
2	Hyundai Mipo Dockyard (C)	27	13	5	9	35	31	+4	44	Qualification for playoffs semi-final
3	Gyeongju KHNP	27	11	9	7	43	31	+12	42	Qualification for playoffs first round
4	Changwon City	27	10	9	8	33	29	+4	39	Qualification for playoffs first round
5	Cheonan City	27	10	9	8	34	31	+3	39	
6	Gimhae City	27	8	10	9	37	34	+3	34	
7	Daejeon Korail	27	8	10	9	33	41	−8	34	
8	Busan Transportation Corporation	27	6	10	11	26	36	−10	28	
9	Mokpo City	27	6	9	12	20	26	−6	27	
10	Yongin City	27	4	7	16	30	48	−18	19	

Source: Korea National League
Rules for classification: 1) Points; 2) Goal difference; 3) Goals scored
(C) Champions

==== Championship playoffs ====
Hyundai Mipo Dockyard advanced to the final after drawing the semi-final due to a higher ranking in the regular season.

First round
3	Gyeongju KHNP	2
4	Changwon City	0

Semi-final
2	Hyundai Mipo Dockyard	1
3	Gyeongju KHNP	1

Final
2	Hyundai Mipo Dockyard	1	1	2
1	Gangneung City	0	1	1

=== K3 League ===
==== Regular season ====
Pos	Team	Pld	W	D	L	GF	GA	GD	Pts	Qualification or relegation
1	Pocheon Citizen (C)	19	16	2	1	52	14	+38	50	Qualification for Championship final
2	Gimpo Citizen	19	16	1	2	46	14	+32	49	Qualification for Championship first round
3	Cheongju City	19	15	1	3	42	12	+30	46	Qualification for Championship first round
4	Yangju Citizen	19	12	4	3	46	31	+15	40	Qualification for Championship first round
5	Jeonju FC	19	11	4	4	36	24	+12	37	Qualification for Championship first round
6	Icheon Citizen	19	11	3	5	53	24	+29	36	
7	Paju Citizen	19	10	4	5	47	24	+23	34	
8	Chuncheon FC	19	10	2	7	23	18	+5	32	
9	Hwaseong FC	19	9	4	6	37	26	+11	31	
10	Gyeongju Citizen	19	9	3	7	32	24	+8	30	
11	Yangpyeong FC	19	8	6	5	34	26	+8	30	
12	Siheung Citizen (R)	19	8	2	9	32	40	−8	26	Qualification for relegation playoffs
13	Jungnang Chorus Mustang (R)	19	6	4	9	25	27	−2	22	Qualification for relegation playoffs
14	Pyeongchang FC (R)	19	5	3	11	18	39	−21	18	Qualification for relegation playoffs
15	Chungbuk Cheongju (O)	19	5	2	12	20	33	−13	17	Qualification for relegation playoffs
16	Buyeo FC (R)	19	3	5	11	18	32	−14	14	Relegation to K3 League Basic
17	Seoul United (R)	19	3	3	13	26	53	−27	12	Relegation to K3 League Basic
18	Yeonggwang FC (R)	19	2	2	15	16	53	−37	8	Relegation to K3 League Basic
19	Goyang Citizen (R)	19	1	3	15	20	58	−38	6	Relegation to K3 League Basic
20	FC Uijeongbu (R)	19	1	0	18	13	64	−51	3	Relegation to K3 League Basic

Source: JoinKFA Soccerway
Rules for classification: 1) Points; 2) Goal difference; 3) Goals scored
(C) Champions; (O) Play-off winners; (R) Relegated

==== Relegation playoffs ====
Semifinals
12	Siheung Citizen	1
15	Chungbuk Cheongju	2
13	Jungnang Chorus Mustang	0
14	Pyeongchang FC	1

Finals
Chungbuk Cheongju	3
Pyeongchang FC	1

==== Championship playoffs ====
When the first round and semi-final matches were finished as draws, their winners were decided on the regular season rankings without extra time and the penalty shoot-out.

First round
2	Gimpo Citizen	0
5	Jeonju FC	1
3	Cheongju City	1
4	Yangju Citizen	1

Semi-final
5	Jeonju FC	1
3	Cheongju City	1

Final
Pocheon Citizen	0	4	4
Cheongju City	0	2	2

=== WK League ===
==== Regular season ====
Pos	Team	Pld	W	D	L	GF	GA	GD	Pts	Qualification
1	Incheon Hyundai Steel Red Angels (C)	24	16	7	1	55	21	+34	55	Qualification for playoffs final
2	Icheon Daekyo	24	16	5	3	46	20	+26	53	Qualification for playoffs semi-final
3	Gumi Sportstoto	24	10	6	8	31	27	+4	36	Qualification for playoffs semi-final
4	Hwacheon KSPO	24	9	6	9	35	32	+3	33	
5	Seoul WFC	24	7	5	12	33	48	−15	26	
6	Suwon FMC	24	4	8	12	26	38	−12	20	
7	Boeun Sangmu	24	1	5	18	13	53	−40	8	

Source: KWFF
Rules for classification: 1) Points; 2) Goal difference; 3) Goals scored
(C) Champions

==== Championship playoffs ====
Semi-final			Final
			1	Incheon Hyundai Steel Red Angels	0	4	4
2	Icheon Daekyo	2		Icheon Daekyo	0	0	0
3	Gumi Sportstoto	0

== Domestic cups ==
=== Korean FA Cup ===
Round of 32
FC Seoul (a.e.t.)	4
Daegu FC	2
Ansan Mugunghwa (a.e.t.)	3
Konkuk University	2
Jeonnam Dragons	4
Gangwon FC	0
Gangneung City	1 (3)
Yongin City	1 (4)
Jeonbuk Hyundai Motors	4
FC Anyang	1
Sangju Sangmu	1
Dankook University	2
Pohang Steelers	0
Bucheon FC 1995	2
Gyeongju Citizen	2
Pocheon Citizen	1
Suwon Samsung Bluewings	1
Gyeongju KHNP	0
Busan IPark	3
Busan Transportation Corporation	0
Seongnam FC	1
Yeungnam University	0
Seoul E-Land	2 (1)
Sungkyunkwan University (p)	2 (3)
Ulsan Hyundai	2
Daejeon Korail	0
Jeju United	1 (3)
Gwangju FC (p)	1 (5)
Incheon United	1
Cheongju City	0
Daejeon Citizen (p)	1 (3)
Suwon FC	1 (1)

Round of 16
FC Seoul	2
Ansan Mugunghwa	1
Jeonnam Dragons	4
Yongin City	2
Jeonbuk Hyundai Motors (a.e.t.)	3
Dankook University	1
Bucheon FC 1995	3
Gyeongju Citizen	1
Suwon Samsung Bluewings	1
Busan IPark	0
Seongnam FC	2
Sungkyunkwan University	0
Ulsan Hyundai	1
Gwangju FC	0
Incheon United (a.e.t.)	3
Daejeon Citizen	2

Quarter-finals
FC Seoul (p)	0 (4)
Jeonnam Dragons	0 (3)
Jeonbuk Hyundai Motors	2
Bucheon FC 1995	3
Suwon Samsung Bluewings (p)	1 (4)
Seongnam FC	1 (3)
Ulsan Hyundai	4
Incheon United	1

Semi-finals
26 October – Seoul
FC Seoul	1
Bucheon FC 1995	0
26 October – Ulsan
Suwon Samsung Bluewings	3
Ulsan Hyundai	1

Final
27 November, 3 December
FC Seoul	1	2	3 (9)
Suwon Samsung Bluewings (p)	2	1	3 (10)

=== Korea National League Championship ===
==== Group stage ====
Group A
Pos	Team	Pld	Pts
1	Daejeon Korail	4	10
2	Mokpo City	4	9
3	Gyeongju KHNP	4	6
4	Changwon City	4	3
5	Gangneung City	4	1

Group B
Pos	Team	Pld	Pts
1	Hyundai Mipo Dockyard	4	10
2	Gimhae City	4	7
3	Yongin City	4	6
4	Cheonan City	4	3
5	Busan Transportation Corporation	4	3

==== Knockout stage ====
Semifinals
A1	Daejeon Korail (p)	0 (6)
B2	Gimhae City	0 (5)
B1	Hyundai Mipo Dockyard (p)	1 (7)
A2	Mokpo City	1 (6)

Final
Daejeon Korail	0
Hyundai Mipo Dockyard	1

== International cups ==
=== AFC Champions League ===
Team	Result	Round	Aggregate	Score	Venue	Opponent
FC Seoul	Semi-finals	Group F	Winners	6–0	Away	(Thailand) Buriram United
FC Seoul	Semi-finals	Group F	Winners	2–1	Home	(Thailand) Buriram United
FC Seoul	Semi-finals	Group F	Winners	4–1	Home	(Japan) Sanfrecce Hiroshima
FC Seoul	Semi-finals	Group F	Winners	1–2	Away	(Japan) Sanfrecce Hiroshima
FC Seoul	Semi-finals	Group F	Winners	4–1	Away	(China) Shandong Luneng
FC Seoul	Semi-finals	Group F	Winners	0–0	Home	(China) Shandong Luneng
FC Seoul	Semi-finals	Round of 16	3–3 (7–6 p)	0–1	Away	(Japan) Urawa Red Diamonds
FC Seoul	Semi-finals	Round of 16	3–3 (7–6 p)	3–2 (a.e.t.)	Home	(Japan) Urawa Red Diamonds
FC Seoul	Semi-finals	Quarter-finals	4–2	3–1	Home	(China) Shandong Luneng
FC Seoul	Semi-finals	Quarter-finals	4–2	1–1	Away	(China) Shandong Luneng
FC Seoul	Semi-finals	Semi-finals	3–5	1–4	Away	(South Korea) Jeonbuk Hyundai Motors
FC Seoul	Semi-finals	Semi-finals	3–5	2–1	Home	(South Korea) Jeonbuk Hyundai Motors
Jeonbuk Hyundai Motors	Champions	Group E	Winners	2–1	Home	(Japan) FC Tokyo
Jeonbuk Hyundai Motors	Champions	Group E	Winners	3–0	Away	(Japan) FC Tokyo
Jeonbuk Hyundai Motors	Champions	Group E	Winners	2–3	Away	(China) Jiangsu Suning
Jeonbuk Hyundai Motors	Champions	Group E	Winners	2–2	Home	(China) Jiangsu Suning
Jeonbuk Hyundai Motors	Champions	Group E	Winners	2–0	Home	(Vietnam) Becamex Binh Duong
Jeonbuk Hyundai Motors	Champions	Group E	Winners	2–3	Away	(Vietnam) Becamex Binh Duong
Jeonbuk Hyundai Motors	Champions	Round of 16	3–2	1–1	Away	(Australia) Melbourne Victory
Jeonbuk Hyundai Motors	Champions	Round of 16	3–2	2–1	Home	(Australia) Melbourne Victory
Jeonbuk Hyundai Motors	Champions	Quarter-finals	5–0	0–0	Away	(China) Shanghai SIPG
Jeonbuk Hyundai Motors	Champions	Quarter-finals	5–0	5–0	Home	(China) Shanghai SIPG
Jeonbuk Hyundai Motors	Champions	Semi-finals	5–3	4–1	Home	(South Korea) FC Seoul
Jeonbuk Hyundai Motors	Champions	Semi-finals	5–3	1–2	Away	(South Korea) FC Seoul
Jeonbuk Hyundai Motors	Champions	Final	3–2	2–1	Home	(United Arab Emirates) Al-Ain
Jeonbuk Hyundai Motors	Champions	Final	3–2	1–1	Away	(United Arab Emirates) Al-Ain
Pohang Steelers	Group stage	Qualifying play-offs	3–0	3–0	—	(Vietnam) Hanoi
Pohang Steelers	Group stage	Group H	Fourth place	0–0	Away	(China) Guangzhou Evergrande
Pohang Steelers	Group stage	Group H	Fourth place	0–2	Home	(China) Guangzhou Evergrande
Pohang Steelers	Group stage	Group H	Fourth place	1–0	Home	(Japan) Urawa Red Diamonds
Pohang Steelers	Group stage	Group H	Fourth place	1–1	Away	(Japan) Urawa Red Diamonds
Pohang Steelers	Group stage	Group H	Fourth place	0–1	Home	(Australia) Sydney FC
Pohang Steelers	Group stage	Group H	Fourth place	0–1	Away	(Australia) Sydney FC
Suwon Samsung Bluewings	Group stage	Group G	Third place	0–0	Home	(Japan) Gamba Osaka
Suwon Samsung Bluewings	Group stage	Group G	Third place	2–1	Away	(Japan) Gamba Osaka
Suwon Samsung Bluewings	Group stage	Group G	Third place	1–2	Away	(China) Shanghai SIPG
Suwon Samsung Bluewings	Group stage	Group G	Third place	3–0	Home	(China) Shanghai SIPG
Suwon Samsung Bluewings	Group stage	Group G	Third place	0–0	Away	(Australia) Melbourne Victory
Suwon Samsung Bluewings	Group stage	Group G	Third place	1–1	Home	(Australia) Melbourne Victory

=== FIFA Club World Cup ===
Team	Result	Round	Score	Opponent
Jeonbuk Hyundai Motors	Fifth place	Quarter-finals	1–2	(Mexico) América
Jeonbuk Hyundai Motors	Fifth place	Fifth place match	4–1	(South Africa) Mamelodi Sundowns

== See also ==
- Football in South Korea
