= 2018 in South Korean football =

Football in South Korea
- Season: 2018

Men's football
- K League 1: Jeonbuk Hyundai Motors
- K League 2: Asan Mugunghwa
- National League: Gyeongju KHNP
- K3 League Advanced: Gyeongju Citizen
- K3 League Basic: Siheung Citizen
- Korean FA Cup: Daegu FC

Women's football
- WK League: Incheon Hyundai Steel Red Angels

This article shows a summary of the 2018 football season in South Korea.

== National teams ==
=== FIFA World Cup ===
For the combined qualification matches for the 2018 FIFA World Cup and the 2019 AFC Asian Cup, South Korea won all seven matches without conceding a goal in the second round but following a series of poor results in the third round of qualifiers, including losses to China and Qatar, the former manager Uli Stielike was sacked and was replaced by under-23 coach Shin Tae-yong for the remainder of the qualifying round. Under Shin Tae-yong, the team managed to qualify as the second-placed team in their group following two goalless draws against Iran and Uzbekistan, sending South Korea to the World Cup for the ninth consecutive time. Shin quickly tested various tactics after the qualifiers, but he had difficulty carrying out his plan due to injuries of many players. Some of them were eventually excluded from the team.

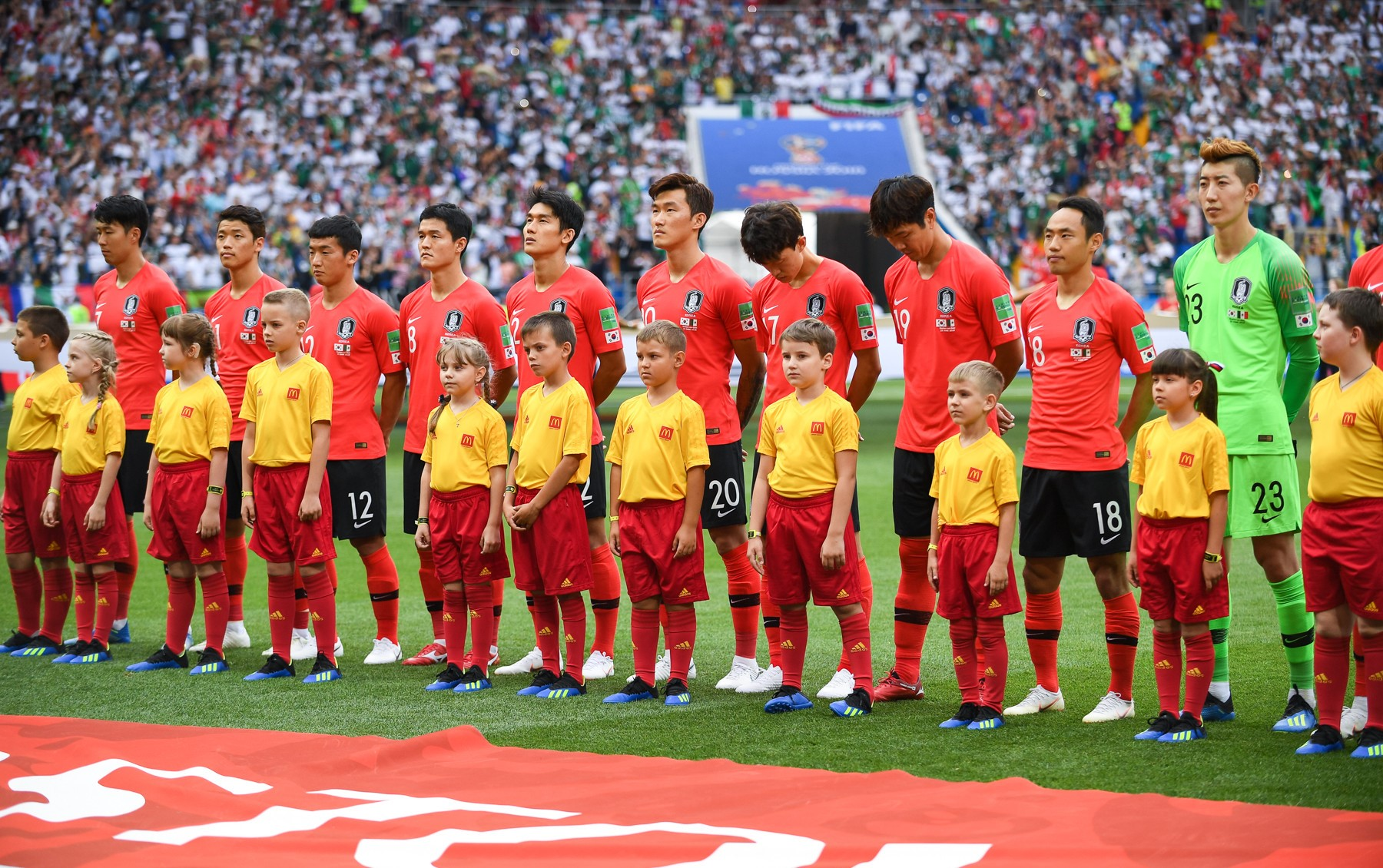
South Korea national team at the 2018 FIFA World Cup in Russia

At the 2018 World Cup, they lost their first game against Sweden 1–0 after conceding from a penalty. They then faced Mexico and lost 2–1 after conceding another penalty. However, despite their two consecutive losses, South Korea was not eliminated just yet. To have any chance of advancing, South Korea would have to win their final group stage match against the defending champions Germany by at least two goals and Mexico would have to defeat Sweden in its last group stage game. South Korea for its part did what it had to do to stay in contention and won 2–0 against Germany with goals from Kim Young-gwon and Son Heung-min, causing them to be eliminated in the first round for the first time in 80 years. Germany had 28 shots with 6 on target, but the South Korea's defense, led by keeper Jo Hyeon-woo, did not concede once. However, Mexico lost to Sweden that same day and thus South Korea ultimately finished third in the group. As a result, South Korea saved Mexico from being eliminated and Mexican fans heavily praised the Koreans and celebrated their victory in front of the South Korean embassy. The match is also called the "Miracle of Kazan" in South Korea although they dropped out of the tournament.

| 18 June Group F | Sweden | 1–0 | South Korea | Nizhny Novgorod, Russia |
| 15:00 UTC+3 | Claesson (yellow card) 61'; Granqvist 65' (pen.) | Report | Kim Shin-wook (yellow card) 13'; Hwang Hee-chan (yellow card) 55' | Stadium: Nizhny Novgorod Stadium; Attendance: 42,300; Referee: Joel Aguilar (El Salvador) |

| 23 June Group F | South Korea | 1–2 | Mexico | Rostov-on-Don, Russia |
| 18:00 UTC+3 | Kim Young-gwon (yellow card) 58'; Lee Yong (yellow card) 63'; Lee Seung-woo (yellow card) 72'; Jung Woo-young (yellow card) 80'; Son Heung-min 90+3' | Report | Vela 26' (pen.); Hernández 66' | Stadium: Rostov Arena; Attendance: 43,472; Referee: Milorad Mažić (Serbia) |

| 27 June Group F | South Korea | 2–0 | Germany | Kazan, Russia |
| 17:00 UTC+3 | Jung Woo-young (yellow card) 9'; Lee Jae-sung (yellow card) 23'; Moon Seon-min (yellow card) 48'; Son Heung-min (yellow card) 65' (goal) 90+6'; Kim Young-gwon 90+4' | Report | | Stadium: Kazan Arena; Attendance: 41,835; Referee: Mark Geiger (United States) |

Group F table
| Pos | Team | Pld | W | D | L | GF | GA | GD | Pts | Qualification |
|---|---|---|---|---|---|---|---|---|---|---|
| 1 | Sweden | 3 | 2 | 0 | 1 | 5 | 2 | +3 | 6 | Advance to knockout stage |
| 2 | Mexico | 3 | 2 | 0 | 1 | 3 | 4 | –1 | 6 | Advance to knockout stage |
| 3 | South Korea | 3 | 1 | 0 | 2 | 3 | 3 | 0 | 3 | |
| 4 | Germany | 3 | 1 | 0 | 2 | 2 | 4 | –2 | 3 | |

=== AFC U-23 Championship ===
| 11 January Group D | South Korea | 2–1 | Vietnam | Kunshan, China |
| 19:30 (UTC+8) | Cho Young-wook 29'; Lee Keun-ho 73' | Report | Quang Hải 17' | Stadium: Kunshan Stadium; Attendance: 766; Referee: Turki Al-Khudhayr (Saudi Arabia) |

| 14 January Group D | Syria | 0–0 | South Korea | Kunshan, China |
| 19:30 (UTC+8) | | Report | | Stadium: Kunshan Stadium; Attendance: 685; Referee: Ravshan Irmatov (Uzbekistan) |

| 17 January Group D | South Korea | 3–2 | Australia | Kunshan, China |
| 19:30 (UTC+8) | Lee Keun-ho 18', 65'; Han Seung-gyu 44' | Report | Cowburn 72'; Buhagiar 76' | Stadium: Kunshan Stadium; Attendance: 678; Referee: Abdulrahman Al-Jassim (Qatar) |

Group D table
| Pos | Team | Pld | W | D | L | GF | GA | GD | Pts | Qualification |
|---|---|---|---|---|---|---|---|---|---|---|
| 1 | South Korea | 3 | 2 | 1 | 0 | 5 | 3 | +2 | 7 | Advance to knockout stage |
| 2 | Vietnam | 3 | 1 | 1 | 1 | 2 | 2 | 0 | 4 | Advance to knockout stage |
| 3 | Australia | 3 | 1 | 0 | 2 | 5 | 5 | 0 | 3 | |
| 4 | Syria | 3 | 0 | 2 | 1 | 1 | 3 | −2 | 2 | |

Source: AFC
Rules for classification: Tiebreakers

| 20 January Quarter-finals | South Korea | 2–1 | Malaysia | Kunshan, China |
| 16:00 (UTC+8) | Cho Jae-wan 1'; Han Seung-gyu 85' | Report | Thanabalan 67' | Stadium: Kunshan Stadium; Attendance: 738; Referee: Adham Makhadmeh (Jordan) |

| 23 January Semi-finals | Uzbekistan | 4–1 (a.e.t.) | South Korea | Kunshan, China |
| 19:30 (UTC+8) | Urinboev 33'; Ganiev 99'; Yakhshiboev 110'; Komilov 120+1' | Report | Hwang Hyun-soo 58' | Stadium: Kunshan Stadium; Attendance: 367; Referee: Turki Al-Khudhayr (Saudi Arabia) |

| 26 January Third place match | Qatar | 1–0 | South Korea | Kunshan, China |
| 19:30 (UTC+8) | Afif 39' | Report | | Stadium: Kunshan Stadium; Attendance: 168; Referee: Adham Makhadmeh (Jordan) |

=== Asian Games ===
| 15 August Group E | South Korea | 6–0 | Bahrain | Soreang, Indonesia |
| 19:00 (UTC+7) | Hwang Ui-jo 17', 36', 43'; Kim Jin-ya 23'; Na Sang-ho 41'; Hwang Hee-chan 90+3' | Report | | Stadium: Jalak Harupat Stadium; Referee: Takuto Okabe (Japan) |

| 17 August Group E | Malaysia | 2–1 | South Korea | Soreang, Indonesia |
| 19:00 (UTC+7) | Safawi 5', 45+1' | Report | Hwang Ui-jo 87' | Stadium: Jalak Harupat Stadium; Referee: Mohammed Al-Hoish (Saudi Arabia) |

| 20 August Group E | South Korea | 1–0 | Kyrgyzstan | Soreang, Indonesia |
| 19:00 (UTC+7) | Son Heung-min 63' | Report | | Stadium: Jalak Harupat Stadium; Referee: Masoud Tufaylieh (Syria) |

Group E table
| Pos | Team | Pld | W | D | L | GF | GA | GD | Pts | Qualification |
|---|---|---|---|---|---|---|---|---|---|---|
| 1 | Malaysia | 3 | 2 | 0 | 1 | 7 | 5 | +2 | 6 (Note: Head-to-head result: Malaysia 2–1 South Korea.) | Advance to knockout stage |
| 2 | South Korea | 3 | 2 | 0 | 1 | 8 | 2 | +6 | 6 | Advance to knockout stage |
| 3 | Bahrain | 3 | 1 | 1 | 1 | 5 | 10 | −5 | 4 | Advance to knockout stage |
| 4 | Kyrgyzstan | 3 | 0 | 1 | 2 | 3 | 6 | −3 | 1 | |

Source: Asian Games
Rules for classification: Group stage tiebreakers
Notes:

| 23 August Round of 16 | Iran | 0–2 | South Korea | Cikarang, Indonesia |
| 19:30 (UTC+7) | | Report | Hwang Ui-jo 40'; Lee Seung-woo 55' | Stadium: Wibawa Mukti Stadium; Referee: Ahmad Yacoub Ibrahim (Jordan) |

| 27 August Quarter-finals | Uzbekistan | 3–4 (a.e.t.) | South Korea | Bekasi, Indonesia |
| 16:00 (UTC+7) | Masharipov 17'; Alibaev 53'; Hwang Hyun-soo 55' (o.g.) | Report | Hwang Ui-jo 4', 34', 75'; Hwang Hee-chan 118' (pen.) | Stadium: Patriot Candrabhaga Stadium; Referee: Mohammed Al-Hoish (Saudi Arabia) |

| 29 August Semi-finals | Vietnam | 1–3 | South Korea | Cibinong, Indonesia |
| 16:00 (UTC+7) | Minh Vương 70' | Report | Lee Seung-woo 7', 55'; Hwang Ui-jo 28' | Stadium: Pakansari Stadium; Referee: Masoud Tufaylieh (Syria) |

| 1 September Final | South Korea | 2–1 (a.e.t.) | Japan | Cibinong, Indonesia |
| 18:30 (UTC+7) | Lee Seung-woo 93'; Hwang Hee-chan 101' | Report | Ueda 115' | Stadium: Pakansari Stadium; Referee: Aziz Asimov (Uzbekistan) |

=== Friendlies ===
==== Senior team ====
| 27 January | South Korea | 1–0 | Moldova | Antalya, Turkey |
| 16:00 UTC+3 | Kim Shin-wook 67' | Report | Ambros (yellow card) 78' | Stadium: Mardan Stadium; Attendance: 1,000; Referee: Alper Ulusoy (Turkey) |

| 30 January | South Korea | 2–2 | Jamaica | Antalya, Turkey |
| 14:00 UTC+3 | Kim Shin-wook 55', 63'; Kim Jin-su (yellow card) 79' | Report | Kelly 4' (yellow card) 40'; Francis (yellow card) 49'; Foster 72' | Stadium: Mardan Stadium; Attendance: 100; Referee: Alper Ulusoy (Turkey) |

| 3 February | South Korea | 1–0 | Latvia | Antalya, Turkey |
| 17:30 UTC+3 | Kim Shin-wook 33' | Report | | Stadium: Mardan Stadium; Attendance: 100; Referee: Ali Palabıyık (Turkey) |

| 24 March | Northern Ireland | 2–1 | South Korea | Belfast, Northern Ireland |
| 14:00 UTC+0 | Kim Min-jae 20' (o.g.); Smyth 86' | Report | Kwon Chang-hoon 7' | Stadium: Windsor Park; Attendance: 18,103; Referee: Bobby Madden (Scotland) |

| 27 March | Poland | 3–2 | South Korea | Chorzów, Poland |
| 20:45 UTC+2 | Lewandowski 32'; Grosicki 45'; Rybus (yellow card) 62'; Zieliński 90+2' | Report | Choi Chul-soon (yellow card) 76'; Lee Chang-min 85'; Hwang Hee-chan 87' | Stadium: Silesian Stadium; Attendance: 53,129; Referee: Tore Hansen (Norway) |

| 28 May | South Korea | 2–0 | Honduras | Daegu, South Korea |
| 20:00 UTC+9 | Son Heung-min 60'; Moon Seon-min 72' | Report | Claros (yellow card) 25'; Castillo (yellow card) 90+2' | Stadium: Daegu Stadium; Attendance: 33,252; Referee: Hiroyuki Kimura (Japan) |

| 1 June | South Korea | 1–3 | Bosnia and Herzegovina | Jeonju, South Korea |
| 20:00 UTC+9 | Lee Jae-sung 30'; Jung Woo-young (yellow card) 56' | Report | Šunjić (yellow card) 17'; Višća 28', 45+1', 79'; Sarić (yellow card) 58' | Stadium: Jeonju World Cup Stadium; Attendance: 41,254; Referee: Peter Green (Australia) |

| 7 June | South Korea | 0–0 | Bolivia | Innsbruck, Austria |
| 14:10 UTC+2 | | Report | | Stadium: Tivoli-Neu; Attendance: 500; Referee: Robert Schörgenhofer (Austria) |

| 11 June | South Korea | 0–2 | Senegal | Grödig, Austria |
| 15:30 UTC+2 | | Report | Sabaly (yellow card); Kouyaté (yellow card); Niang (yellow card); Kim Shin-wook 55' (o.g.); Konaté 86' (pen.) | Stadium: Untersberg-Arena; Referee: Harald Lechner (Austria) |

| 7 September | South Korea | 2–0 | Costa Rica | Goyang, South Korea |
| 20:00 UTC+9 | Lee Jae-sung 35'; Nam Tae-hee 78' | Report | Gamboa (yellow card) 34'; Guzmán (yellow card) 35' | Stadium: Goyang Stadium; Attendance: 36,127; Referee: Ma Ning (China) |

| 11 September | South Korea | 0–0 | Chile | Suwon, South Korea |
| 20:00 UTC+9 | Kim Young-gwon (yellow card) 41'; Hwang In-beom (yellow card) 90+1' | Report | Medel (yellow card) 13' | Stadium: Suwon World Cup Stadium; Attendance: 40,127; Referee: Ryuji Sato (Japan) |

| 12 October | South Korea | 2–1 | Uruguay | Seoul, South Korea |
| 20:00 UTC+9 | Hwang Ui-jo 66'; Jung Woo-young 79' | Report | Nández (yellow card) 27'; Muslera (yellow card) 65'; Vecino 72'; Bentancur (yellow card) 75' | Stadium: Seoul World Cup Stadium; Attendance: 64,170; Referee: Alireza Faghani (Iran) |

| 16 October | South Korea | 2–2 | Panama | Cheonan, South Korea |
| 20:00 UTC+9 | Park Joo-ho 6'; Hwang In-beom 33' (yellow card) 51'; Kim Young-gwon (yellow card) 88' | Report | Arroyo 45'; Blackburn 49' | Stadium: Cheonan Stadium; Attendance: 25,556; Referee: Alireza Faghani (Iran) |

| 17 November | Australia | 1–1 | South Korea | Brisbane, Australia |
| 18:50 UTC+10 | Milligan (yellow card) 88'; Boyle (yellow card) 89'; Luongo 90+4' | Report | Hwang Ui-jo 22'; Hong Chul (yellow card) 38' | Stadium: Suncorp Stadium; Attendance: 32,922; Referee: Jumpei Iida (Japan) |

| 20 November | South Korea | 4–0 | Uzbekistan | Brisbane, Australia |
| 20:00 UTC+10 | Nam Tae-hee 9'; Hwang Ui-jo 24'; Moon Seon-min 70'; Suk Hyun-jun 82' | Report | | Stadium: QSAC; Attendance: 1,705; Referee: Chris Beath (Australia) |

| 31 December | South Korea | 0–0 | Saudi Arabia | Abu Dhabi, United Arab Emirates |
| 20:00 UTC+4 | | Report | Al-Owais (yellow card) 82' | Stadium: Baniyas Stadium; Attendance: 300; Referee: Adel Al Naqbi (United Arab Emirates) |

==== Under-23 team ====
| 23 June | Indonesia | 1–2 | South Korea | Cibinong, Indonesia |
| (UTC+7) | Hansamu 90+4' | Report | Jeong Tae-wook 43'; Han Seung-gyu 90+5' | Stadium: Pakansari Stadium |

== Leagues ==
=== K League 1 ===
| Pos | Team | Pld | W | D | L | GF | GA | GD | Pts | Qualification or relegation |
|---|---|---|---|---|---|---|---|---|---|---|
| 1 | Jeonbuk Hyundai Motors (C) | 38 | 26 | 8 | 4 | 75 | 31 | +44 | 86 | Qualification for Champions League group stage |
| 2 | Gyeongnam FC | 38 | 18 | 11 | 9 | 59 | 44 | +15 | 65 | Qualification for Champions League group stage |
| 3 | Ulsan Hyundai | 38 | 17 | 12 | 9 | 61 | 46 | +15 | 63 | Qualification for Champions League playoff round |
| 4 | Pohang Steelers | 38 | 15 | 9 | 14 | 47 | 48 | −1 | 54 | |
| 5 | Jeju United | 38 | 14 | 12 | 12 | 41 | 41 | 0 | 54 | |
| 6 | Suwon Samsung Bluewings | 38 | 13 | 11 | 14 | 53 | 54 | −1 | 50 | |
| 7 | Daegu FC | 38 | 14 | 8 | 16 | 47 | 56 | −9 | 50 | Qualification for Champions League group stage (Note: Qualified as champions of FA Cup.) |
| 8 | Gangwon FC | 38 | 12 | 10 | 16 | 56 | 60 | −4 | 46 | |
| 9 | Incheon United | 38 | 10 | 12 | 16 | 55 | 69 | −14 | 42 | |
| 10 | Sangju Sangmu | 38 | 10 | 10 | 18 | 41 | 52 | −11 | 40 | |
| 11 | FC Seoul (O) | 38 | 9 | 13 | 16 | 40 | 48 | −8 | 40 | Qualification for relegation playoffs |
| 12 | Jeonnam Dragons (R) | 38 | 8 | 8 | 22 | 43 | 69 | −26 | 32 | Relegation to K League 2 |

Source: K League
Rules for classification: 1) Points; 2) Goals scored; 3) Goal difference; 4) Wins; 5) Head-to-head points
(C) Champions; (O) Play-off winners; (R) Relegated

=== K League 2 ===
==== Regular season ====
| Pos | Team | Pld | W | D | L | GF | GA | GD | Pts | Qualification |
|---|---|---|---|---|---|---|---|---|---|---|
| 1 | Asan Mugunghwa (Note: Asan Mugunghwa was disqualified from promoting to the K League 1 due to lack of players who could meet clubs' requisite for maintenance. Therefore, runner-up Seongnam FC was directly promoted, and 5th-placed team Gwangju FC qualified for the promotion playoffs.) (C) | 36 | 21 | 9 | 6 | 54 | 27 | +27 | 72 | |
| 2 | Seongnam FC (P) | 36 | 18 | 11 | 7 | 49 | 36 | +13 | 65 | Promotion to K League 1 |
| 3 | Busan IPark | 36 | 14 | 14 | 8 | 53 | 35 | +18 | 56 | Qualification for promotion playoffs semi-final |
| 4 | Daejeon Citizen | 36 | 15 | 8 | 13 | 47 | 44 | +3 | 53 | Qualification for promotion playoffs first round |
| 5 | Gwangju FC | 36 | 11 | 15 | 10 | 51 | 41 | +10 | 48 | Qualification for promotion playoffs first round |
| 6 | FC Anyang | 36 | 12 | 8 | 16 | 44 | 50 | −6 | 44 | |
| 7 | Suwon FC | 36 | 13 | 3 | 20 | 29 | 46 | −17 | 42 | |
| 8 | Bucheon FC 1995 | 36 | 11 | 6 | 19 | 37 | 50 | −13 | 39 | |
| 9 | Ansan Greeners | 36 | 10 | 9 | 17 | 32 | 45 | −13 | 39 | |
| 10 | Seoul E-Land | 36 | 10 | 7 | 19 | 30 | 52 | −22 | 37 | |

Source: K League
Rules for classification: 1) Points; 2) Goals scored; 3) Goal difference; 4) Wins; 5) Head-to-head points
(C) Champions; (P) Promoted

==== Promotion playoffs ====
FC Seoul remains in the K League 1.

First round
4 | Daejeon Citizen | 1
5 | Gwangju FC | 0

Semi-final
3 | Busan IPark | 3
4 | Daejeon Citizen | 0

Final
Busan IPark | 1 | 1 | 2
FC Seoul | 3 | 1 | 4

=== Korea National League ===
==== Regular season ====
| Pos | Team | Pld | W | D | L | GF | GA | GD | Pts | Qualification |
|---|---|---|---|---|---|---|---|---|---|---|
| 1 | Gyeongju KHNP (C) | 28 | 18 | 7 | 3 | 46 | 25 | +21 | 61 | Qualification for playoffs final |
| 2 | Gimhae City | 28 | 16 | 8 | 4 | 46 | 20 | +26 | 56 | Qualification for playoffs semi-final |
| 3 | Cheonan City | 28 | 13 | 7 | 8 | 33 | 32 | +1 | 46 | Qualification for playoffs semi-final |
| 4 | Gangneung City | 28 | 10 | 7 | 11 | 35 | 30 | +5 | 37 | |
| 5 | Mokpo City | 28 | 7 | 10 | 11 | 36 | 42 | −6 | 31 | |
| 6 | Changwon City | 28 | 5 | 13 | 10 | 28 | 41 | −13 | 28 | |
| 7 | Daejeon Korail | 28 | 7 | 6 | 15 | 31 | 40 | −9 | 27 | |
| 8 | Busan Transportation Corporation | 28 | 2 | 10 | 16 | 21 | 46 | −25 | 16 | |

Source: RSSSF
Rules for classification: 1) Points; 2) Goal difference; 3) Goals scored
(C) Champions

==== Championship playoffs ====
| Semi-final | | | | | Final |
| 2 | Gimhae City | 3 | 3 | 6 |
| 3 | Cheonan City | 2 | 0 | 2 |
| 3 | Cheonan City | 2 | 0 | 2 | | Gimhae City | 1 | 0 | 1 |
| | | | | | 1 | Gyeongju KHNP | 2 | 2 | 4 |

=== K3 League Advanced ===
==== Regular season ====
| Pos | Team | Pld | W | D | L | GF | GA | GD | Pts | Qualification or relegation |
|---|---|---|---|---|---|---|---|---|---|---|
| 1 | Gyeongju Citizen (C) | 22 | 16 | 2 | 4 | 46 | 21 | +25 | 50 | Qualification for Championship final |
| 2 | Pocheon Citizen | 22 | 15 | 1 | 6 | 58 | 30 | +28 | 46 | Qualification for Championship first round |
| 3 | Icheon Citizen | 22 | 11 | 5 | 6 | 33 | 25 | +8 | 38 | Qualification for Championship first round |
| 4 | Gimpo Citizen | 22 | 11 | 4 | 7 | 42 | 31 | +11 | 37 | Qualification for Championship first round |
| 5 | Chuncheon FC | 22 | 10 | 6 | 6 | 38 | 27 | +11 | 36 | Qualification for Championship first round |
| 6 | Cheongju City | 22 | 9 | 7 | 6 | 26 | 26 | 0 | 34 | |
| 7 | Hwaseong FC | 22 | 9 | 6 | 7 | 32 | 25 | +7 | 33 | |
| 8 | Yangpyeong FC | 22 | 8 | 5 | 9 | 32 | 26 | +6 | 29 | |
| 9 | Pyeongtaek Citizen | 22 | 7 | 4 | 11 | 28 | 34 | −6 | 25 | |
| 10 | Chungbuk Cheongju | 22 | 6 | 2 | 14 | 19 | 37 | −18 | 20 | |
| 11 | Jeonju Citizen (R) | 22 | 5 | 1 | 16 | 25 | 46 | −21 | 16 | Relegation to K3 League Basic |
| 12 | Seoul Jungnang (R) | 22 | 3 | 1 | 18 | 23 | 74 | −51 | 10 | Relegation to K3 League Basic |

Source: Soccerway
Rules for classification: 1) Points; 2) Goal difference; 3) Goals scored
(C) Champions; (R) Relegated

==== Championship playoffs ====
When the first round and semi-final matches were finished as draws, their winners were decided on the regular season rankings without extra time and the penalty shoot-out.

First round
2 | Pocheon Citizen | 3
5 | Chuncheon FC | 3
3 | Icheon Citizen | 1
4 | Gimpo Citizen | 1

Semi-final
Pocheon Citizen | 1
Icheon Citizen | 2

Final
Gyeongju Citizen | 0 | 2 | 2
Icheon Citizen | 0 | 1 | 1

=== K3 League Basic ===
==== Regular season ====
| Pos | Team | Pld | W | D | L | GF | GA | GD | Pts | Promotion or qualification |
|---|---|---|---|---|---|---|---|---|---|---|
| 1 | Siheung Citizen (C, P) | 20 | 15 | 1 | 4 | 40 | 10 | +30 | 46 | Promotion to K3 League Advanced |
| 2 | Paju Citizen (P) | 20 | 14 | 1 | 5 | 61 | 15 | +46 | 43 | Promotion to K3 League Advanced |
| 3 | Busan FC (Note: Busan FC was dissolved just after the regular season.) | 20 | 12 | 4 | 4 | 46 | 17 | +29 | 40 | |
| 4 | Chungju Citizen (O, P) | 20 | 13 | 1 | 6 | 45 | 17 | +28 | 40 | Qualification for promotion playoff |
| 5 | Yangju Citizen | 20 | 11 | 5 | 4 | 41 | 19 | +22 | 38 | Qualification for promotion playoff |
| 6 | Yeoju Sejong | 20 | 11 | 1 | 8 | 50 | 29 | +21 | 34 | |
| 7 | Buyeo FC | 20 | 7 | 3 | 10 | 47 | 41 | +6 | 24 | |
| 8 | Pyeongchang FC | 20 | 4 | 6 | 10 | 37 | 51 | −14 | 18 | |
| 9 | Goyang Citizen | 20 | 4 | 1 | 15 | 20 | 78 | −58 | 13 | |
| 10 | Seoul United | 20 | 3 | 3 | 14 | 31 | 62 | −31 | 12 | |
| 11 | FC Uijeongbu | 20 | 2 | 2 | 16 | 25 | 104 | −79 | 8 | |

Source: 7m.com JoinKFA
Rules for classification: 1) Points; 2) Goal difference; 3) Goals scored
(C) Champions; (O) Play-off winners; (P) Promoted

==== Promotion playoff ====
When the match was finished as a draw, its winners were decided on the regular season rankings without extra time and the penalty shoot-out. Therefore, Chungju Citizen was promoted to the K3 League Advanced after the draw.

11 November

| Chungju Citizen | 0–0 | Yangju Citizen |
|---|---|---|
| | Report |

Chungju Tangeumdae Stadium, Chungju

=== WK League ===
==== Regular season ====
| Pos | Team | Pld | W | D | L | GF | GA | GD | Pts | Qualification |
|---|---|---|---|---|---|---|---|---|---|---|
| 1 | Incheon Hyundai Steel Red Angels | 28 | 21 | 6 | 1 | 84 | 21 | +63 | 69 | Qualification for playoffs final |
| 2 | Gyeongju KHNP | 28 | 16 | 5 | 7 | 54 | 35 | +19 | 53 | Qualification for playoffs semi-final |
| 3 | Suwon UDC | 28 | 14 | 8 | 6 | 48 | 34 | +14 | 50 | Qualification for playoffs semi-final |
| 4 | Gumi Sportstoto | 28 | 15 | 3 | 10 | 49 | 38 | +11 | 48 | |
| 5 | Hwacheon KSPO | 28 | 13 | 5 | 10 | 52 | 45 | +7 | 44 | |
| 6 | Seoul WFC | 28 | 4 | 9 | 15 | 34 | 57 | −23 | 21 | |
| 7 | Boeun Sangmu | 28 | 3 | 7 | 18 | 18 | 59 | −41 | 16 | |
| 8 | Changnyeong WFC | 28 | 3 | 3 | 22 | 30 | 80 | −50 | 12 | |

Source: Soccerway

==== Championship playoffs ====
| Semi-final | | | Final |
| | | | 1 | Incheon Hyundai Steel Red Angels (p) | 0 | 4 | 4 (3) |
| 2 | Gyeongju KHNP | 2 | | Gyeongju KHNP | 3 | 1 | 4 (1) |
| 3 | Suwon UDC | 0 |

==== Final table ====
| Pos | Team | Qualification |
|---|---|---|
| 1 | Incheon Hyundai Steel Red Angels (C) | Qualification for AFC Club Championship |
| 2 | Gyeongju KHNP | |
| 3 | Suwon UDC | |

Source: RSSSF
(C) Champion

== Domestic cups ==
=== Korean FA Cup ===
Round of 32
Pohang Steelers | 0
Jeonnam Dragons | 1
Daejeon Korail | 1
Chuncheon FC | 2
Jeonbuk Hyundai Motors | 3
Busan Transportation Corporation | 1
Asan Mugunghwa (a.e.t.) | 1
Ansan Greeners | 0
Daegu FC | 4
Yong In University | 1
Sangju Sangmu (p) | 2 (2)
Yangpyeong FC | 2 (4)
Incheon United | 2
Pocheon Citizen | 0
FC Anyang | 1
Mokpo City (a.e.t.) | 2
Ulsan Hyundai | 1
Suwon FC | 0
Busan IPark (a.e.t.) | 3
Gyeongju Citizen | 2
Gangwon FC | 1
Gimhae City | 2
Seongnam FC | 0
Gyeongju KHNP (a.e.t.) | 1
Suwon Samsung Bluewings | 6
Gimpo Citizen | 1
Gangneung City | 1
Cheonan City (a.e.t.) | 2
FC Seoul (p) | 0 (3)
Gyeongnam FC | 0 (1)
Jeju United | 4
Korea University | 1

Round of 16
Jeonnam Dragons | 2
Chuncheon FC | 1
Jeonbuk Hyundai Motors | 1
Asan Mugunghwa | 2
Daegu FC | 8
Yangpyeong FC | 0
Incheon United | 1
Mokpo City | 2
Ulsan Hyundai | 2
Busan IPark | 0
Gimhae City | 1
Gyeongju KHNP | 0
Suwon Samsung Bluewings (a.e.t.) | 4
Cheonan City | 2
FC Seoul | 1
Jeju United | 2

Quarter-finals
Jeonnam Dragons (p) | 1 (4)
Asan Mugunghwa | 1 (2)
Daegu FC | 2
Mokpo City | 1
Ulsan Hyundai | 2
Gimhae City | 0
Suwon Samsung Bluewings (p) | 2 (2)
Jeju United | 2 (1)

Semi-finals
31 October – Gwangyang
Jeonnam Dragons | 1
Daegu FC | 2
31 October – Ulsan
Ulsan Hyundai | 2
Suwon Samsung Bluewings | 1

Final
5, 8 December
Daegu FC | 2 | 3 | 5
Ulsan Hyundai | 1 | 0 | 1

=== Korea National League Championship ===
==== Group stage ====
Group A
| Pos | Team | Pld | Pts |
|---|---|---|---|
| 1 | Cheonan City | 3 | 9 |
| 2 | Gimhae City | 3 | 6 |
| 3 | Busan Transportation Corporation | 3 | 1 |
| 4 | Changwon City | 3 | 1 |

Group B
| Pos | Team | Pld | Pts |
|---|---|---|---|
| 1 | Gyeongju KHNP | 3 | 6 |
| 2 | Daejeon Korail | 3 | 6 |
| 3 | Gangneung City | 3 | 6 |
| 4 | Mokpo City | 3 | 0 |

==== Knockout stage ====
Semi-finals
A1 | Cheonan City | 1
B2 | Daejeon Korail | 2
B1 | Gyeongju KHNP | 2
A2 | Gimhae City | 0

Final
Daejeon Korail | 2
Gyeongju KHNP | 1

== International cups ==
=== AFC Champions League ===
| Team | Result | Round | Aggregate | Score | Venue | Opponent |
|---|---|---|---|---|---|---|
| Jeju United | Group stage | Group G | Fourth place | 0–1 | Home | (Japan) Cerezo Osaka |
| Jeju United | Group stage | Group G | Fourth place | 1–2 | Away | (Japan) Cerezo Osaka |
| Jeju United | Group stage | Group G | Fourth place | 2–0 | Away | (Thailand) Buriram United |
| Jeju United | Group stage | Group G | Fourth place | 0–1 | Home | (Thailand) Buriram United |
| Jeju United | Group stage | Group G | Fourth place | 3–5 | Away | (China) Guangzhou Evergrande |
| Jeju United | Group stage | Group G | Fourth place | 0–2 | Home | (China) Guangzhou Evergrande |
| Jeonbuk Hyundai Motors | Quarter-finals | Group E | Winners | 3–2 | Home | (Japan) Kashiwa Reysol |
| Jeonbuk Hyundai Motors | Quarter-finals | Group E | Winners | 2–0 | Away | (Japan) Kashiwa Reysol |
| Jeonbuk Hyundai Motors | Quarter-finals | Group E | Winners | 6–0 | Away | (Hong Kong) Kitchee |
| Jeonbuk Hyundai Motors | Quarter-finals | Group E | Winners | 3–0 | Home | (Hong Kong) Kitchee |
| Jeonbuk Hyundai Motors | Quarter-finals | Group E | Winners | 6–3 | Home | (China) Tianjin Quanjian |
| Jeonbuk Hyundai Motors | Quarter-finals | Group E | Winners | 2–4 | Away | (China) Tianjin Quanjian |
| Jeonbuk Hyundai Motors | Quarter-finals | Round of 16 | 4–3 | 2–3 | Away | (Thailand) Buriram United |
| Jeonbuk Hyundai Motors | Quarter-finals | Round of 16 | 4–3 | 2–0 | Home | (Thailand) Buriram United |
| Jeonbuk Hyundai Motors | Quarter-finals | Quarter-finals | 3–3 (2–4 p) | 0–3 | Home | (South Korea) Suwon Samsung Bluewings |
| Jeonbuk Hyundai Motors | Quarter-finals | Quarter-finals | 3–3 (2–4 p) | 3–0 (a.e.t.) | Away | (South Korea) Suwon Samsung Bluewings |
| Suwon Samsung Bluewings | Semi-finals | Qualifying play-offs | 5–1 | 5–1 | — | (Vietnam) Thanh Hóa |
| Suwon Samsung Bluewings | Semi-finals | Group H | Winners | 2–0 | Away | (Australia) Sydney FC |
| Suwon Samsung Bluewings | Semi-finals | Group H | Winners | 1–4 | Home | (Australia) Sydney FC |
| Suwon Samsung Bluewings | Semi-finals | Group H | Winners | 1–2 | Home | (Japan) Kashima Antlers |
| Suwon Samsung Bluewings | Semi-finals | Group H | Winners | 1–0 | Away | (Japan) Kashima Antlers |
| Suwon Samsung Bluewings | Semi-finals | Group H | Winners | 1–1 | Home | (China) Shanghai Shenhua |
| Suwon Samsung Bluewings | Semi-finals | Group H | Winners | 2–0 | Away | (China) Shanghai Shenhua |
| Suwon Samsung Bluewings | Semi-finals | Round of 16 | 3–1 | 0–1 | Away | (South Korea) Ulsan Hyundai |
| Suwon Samsung Bluewings | Semi-finals | Round of 16 | 3–1 | 3–0 | Home | (South Korea) Ulsan Hyundai |
| Suwon Samsung Bluewings | Semi-finals | Quarter-finals | 3–3 (4–2 p) | 3–0 | Away | (South Korea) Jeonbuk Hyundai Motors |
| Suwon Samsung Bluewings | Semi-finals | Quarter-finals | 3–3 (4–2 p) | 0–3 (a.e.t.) | Home | (South Korea) Jeonbuk Hyundai Motors |
| Suwon Samsung Bluewings | Semi-finals | Semi-finals | 5–6 | 2–3 | Away | (Japan) Kashima Antlers |
| Suwon Samsung Bluewings | Semi-finals | Semi-finals | 5–6 | 3–3 | Home | (Japan) Kashima Antlers |
| Ulsan Hyundai | Round of 16 | Group F | Runners-up | 3–3 | Away | (Australia) Melbourne Victory |
| Ulsan Hyundai | Round of 16 | Group F | Runners-up | 6–2 | Home | (Australia) Melbourne Victory |
| Ulsan Hyundai | Round of 16 | Group F | Runners-up | 2–1 | Home | (Japan) Kawasaki Frontale |
| Ulsan Hyundai | Round of 16 | Group F | Runners-up | 2–2 | Away | (Japan) Kawasaki Frontale |
| Ulsan Hyundai | Round of 16 | Group F | Runners-up | 2–2 | Away | (China) Shanghai SIPG |
| Ulsan Hyundai | Round of 16 | Group F | Runners-up | 0–1 | Home | (China) Shanghai SIPG |
| Ulsan Hyundai | Round of 16 | Round of 16 | 1–3 | 1–0 | Home | (South Korea) Suwon Samsung Bluewings |
| Ulsan Hyundai | Round of 16 | Round of 16 | 1–3 | 0–3 | Away | (South Korea) Suwon Samsung Bluewings |

== See also ==
- Football in South Korea
