= 2018 K3 League Advanced =

K3 League Advanced
- Season: 2018
- Dates: 24 March – 24 November 2018
- Champions: Gyeongju Citizen (3rd title)
- Relegated: Jeonju Citizen; Seoul Jungnang
- Matches: 132
- Goals: 404 (3.06 per match)
- Best Player: Choi Yong-woo
- Top goalscorer: Choi Yong-woo (16 goals)
- Best goalkeeper: Jeong Gyu-jin
- Biggest home win: Pocheon 7–0 Jungnang
- Biggest away win: Jungnang 0–9 Hwaseong
- Highest attendance: 1655
- Lowest attendance: 75
- Average attendance: 262

The 2018 K3 League Advanced was the twelfth season of amateur K3 League, an association football league in South Korea.

== Teams ==
Club	City	Stadium	Capacity	Manager
Cheongju City	Cheongju	Cheongju Stadium	17,264	(South Korea) Kwon Oh-gyu
Chungbuk Cheongju	Cheongju	Cheongju Stadium	17,264	(South Korea) Park Yang-hoon
Chuncheon FC	Chuncheon	Chuncheon Stadium	20,000	(South Korea) Kim Yong-ho
Gimpo Citizen	Gimpo	Gimpo Sports Complex	5,068	(South Korea) Oh Jong-yeo
Gyeongju Citizen	Gyeongju	Gyeongju Civic Stadium	12,199	(South Korea) Kim Dae-geon
Hwaseong FC	Hwaseong	Hwaseong Stadium	35,270	(South Korea) Kim Seong-nam
Icheon Citizen	Icheon	Icheon Stadium	20,305	(South Korea) Lee Yeong-gi
Jeonju Citizen	Jeonju	Jeonju Sports Complex	30,000	(South Korea) Yang Young-cheol
Seoul Jungnang	Seoul	Jungnang Public Ground	400	(South Korea) Kim Sang-hwa
Pocheon Citizen	Pocheon	Pocheon Stadium	7,000	(South Korea) Kim Jae-hyeong
Pyeongtaek Citizen	Pyeongtaek	Sosabeol Reports Town	15,000	(South Korea) Lee Seong-gyun
Yangpyeong FC	Yangpyeong	Yongmun Sports Park	400	(South Korea) Kim Gyeong-bum

== Regular season ==
=== League table ===
Pos	Team	Pld	W	D	L	GF	GA	GD	Pts	Qualification or relegation
1	Gyeongju Citizen (C)	22	16	2	4	46	21	+25	50	Qualification for the Championship final
2	Pocheon Citizen	22	15	1	6	58	30	+28	46	Qualification for the Championship first round
3	Icheon Citizen	22	11	5	6	33	25	+8	38	Qualification for the Championship first round
4	Gimpo Citizen	22	11	4	7	42	31	+11	37	Qualification for the Championship first round
5	Chuncheon FC	22	10	6	6	38	27	+11	36	Qualification for the Championship first round
6	Cheongju City	22	9	7	6	26	26	0	34	
7	Hwaseong FC	22	9	6	7	32	25	+7	33	
8	Yangpyeong FC	22	8	5	9	32	26	+6	29	
9	Pyeongtaek Citizen	22	7	4	11	28	34	−6	25	
10	Chungbuk Cheongju	22	6	2	14	19	37	−18	20	
11	Jeonju Citizen (R)	22	5	1	16	25	46	−21	16	Relegation to the K3 League Basic
12	Seoul Jungnang (R)	22	3	1	18	23	74	−51	10	Relegation to the K3 League Basic

Source: Soccerway
Rules for classification: 1) Points; 2) Goal difference; 3) Goals scored.
(C) Champions; (R) Relegated

=== Results ===
Home \ Away	GC	FCP	ICH	GIM	CHU	CHE	HWA	YAN	PYE	CC	JEO	SJ
Gyeongju Citizen	—	2–3	1–0	3–1	1–2	2–0	2–0	1–0	2–1	2–0	2–1	6–3
Pocheon Citizen	3–0	—	0–3	4–2	3–1	4–1	2–0	1–2	4–2	3–0	1–4	7–0
Icheon Citizen	1–1	2–0	—	3–2	1–4	1–1	1–1	1–2	1–0	1–0	1–2	1–1
Gimpo Citizen	1–1	2–1	1–2	—	2–1	1–1	1–0	0–1	3–1	2–1	5–0	5–1
Chuncheon FC	1–2	1–2	1–1	1–3	—	1–1	0–0	3–2	2–0	3–3	2–1	3–0
Cheongju City	0–4	1–4	2–1	0–0	0–0	—	2–0	1–0	1–1	2–1	1–0	5–1
Hwaseong FC	0–3	0–2	3–2	3–1	2–1	2–1	—	0–0	1–1	3–1	2–1	1–0
Yangpyeong FC	0–1	3–3	1–1	2–4	1–1	1–2	1–1	—	2–1	3–0	2–0	4–0
Pyeongtaek Citizen	2–1	1–4	2–3	2–0	0–3	0–0	2–2	1–0	—	2–0	5–1	1–0
Chungbuk Cheongju	0–2	2–0	0–2	1–1	0–1	0–1	1–1	1–0	2–1	—	2–1	2–4
Jeonju Citizen	1–4	0–1	1–3	1–3	2–3	1–1	0–2	2–1	1–0	0–1	—	2–3
Seoul Jungnang	1–3	1–6	0–1	1–2	0–3	1–3	0–9	1–4	1–2	3–1	1–3	—

Source: JoinKFA
Legend: Blue = home team win; Yellow = draw; Red = away team win.

== Championship playoffs ==
When the first round and semi-final matches were finished as draws, their winners were decided on the regular season rankings without extra time and the penalty shoot-out.

=== Bracket ===
First round
2	Pocheon Citizen	3
5	Chuncheon FC	3
3	Icheon Citizen	1
4	Gimpo Citizen	1

Semi-final
Pocheon Citizen	1
Icheon Citizen	2

Final
Gyeongju Citizen	0	2	2
Icheon Citizen	0	1	1

== See also ==
- 2018 in South Korean football
- 2018 Korean FA Cup
