= Kim Hee-tae =

South Korean footballer (born 1953)

Personal information
- Date of birth: July 10, 1953 (age 73)
- Position: Defender

Youth career
- 1973–1977: Yonsei University (연세대학교)

Senior career*
Years	Team	Apps	(Gls)
1977–1979	Korea Housing & Commercial Bank FC		
1977–1979	ROK Air Force FC (Military service)		
1981–1983	Daewoo Royals (Semi-professional)		

International career
1973	South Korea U-20	?	
1973–1979	South Korea		

Managerial career
- 1983–1985: Myongji University (coach)(명지대)
- 1986–2003: Daewoo Royals (coach)
- 1987: South Korea (coach)
- 1994–1995: Daewoo Royals
- 1995–2002: Myongji University(명지대)
- 2014–: FC Uijeongbu
- * Club domestic league appearances and goals

- Kim Hee-tae
- Hangul: 김희태
- RR: Gim Huitae
- MR: Kim Hŭit'ae

Kim Hee-Tae (born July 10, 1953) is former South Korean football player and manager. He was served as South Korean national team player for 1974 Asian Games and 1978 Asian Games.
