= FC Uijeongbu =

FC Uijeongbu FC 의정부
- Full name: Football Club Uijeongbu; FC 의정부
- Short name: FCU
- Founded: 29 March 2014; 11 years ago
- Dissolved: 2018; 7 years ago
- Ground: Uijeongbu Stadium
- Capacity: 35,000
- Manager: Kim Hee-tae
- League: K3 League Basic
- 2018: 11th
- Website: http://www.uifc.co.kr
Home colours	Away colours

Football Club Uijeongbu (FC 의정부) was a South Korean amateur football club based in Uijeongbu, South Korea. They played in the K3 League Basic, fifth tier of the South Korean football league system.

== History ==
=== Founding ===
According to their website plans were first set in action to form the club in March 2013, and in the same month the clubs constitution was published. The club founding was announced on 6 October 2013 when the mayor of Uijeongbu signed the club into existence as a citizens club. then On 29 March 2014, Club was officially founded.

=== Entry into the league system ===
Under former Korean national team manager Kim Hee-Tae (김희태), the club held an open trial on 22 October 2013. 34 players attended and the club selected 20. They also shortlisted 10 players from other club where their contracts were due to expire. From the 2014 season, the team started to play in the Challengers League, currently called K3 League.

== Team colours ==
The official uniform has not been shown yet.

== Players ==
=== Current team ===
As of 30 November 2014 Note: Flags indicate national team as defined under FIFA eligibility rules; some limited exceptions apply. Players may hold more than one non-FIFA nationality.

No.	Pos.	Nation	Player
1	GK	KOR	Kim Se-Min
2	DF	KOR	Park Jae-Min
3	MF	KOR	Lee Su-Bin
4	MF	KOR	Ahn Jung-Min
5	DF	KOR	Lim Kyeong-Ho
8	MF	KOR	Yoo Jong-Soo
9	FW	KOR	Lee Ji-Sung
10	MF	KOR	Shin Hak-Young
12	MF	KOR	Kim Young-Hun
13	MF	KOR	Oh Eun-Hyuk
14	FW	KOR	Lim Seung-Hyun
15	MF	KOR	Lee Woo-Yeol
16	MF	KOR	Seo Dong-Ho
17	FW	KOR	Choi Chang-Hyun

No.	Pos.	Nation	Player
19	FW	KOR	Yoo Dong-Kyu
20	DF	KOR	Kim Dong-Uk
22	MF	KOR	Kim Dae-Ung
23	FW	KOR	Jeong Sang-Uk
24	DF	KOR	Kim Tae-Uk
26	FW	KOR	Huh Ung
27	FW	KOR	Paik Min-Woo
28	FW	KOR	Koo Ja-Seung
31	GK	KOR	Cho Cheol-Hwan
32	MF	KOR	Park Seung-Ryeol
33	DF	KOR	Park Ji-Su
34	MF	KOR	Son Hyeong-Jun
35	DF	KOR	Yang Ki-Young
36	MF	KOR	Hwang San-Hyun
37	DF	KOR	Jeong Uk-Hyun
99	MF	KOR	Ma Hyun-Jun
—	DF	CHN	Cao Guodong

== Honours ==
=== Season-by-season records ===
Season	Teams	Tier	Placement	Pld	W	D	L	GF	GA	GD	Pts	League Cup	FA Cup	Manager
2014	18	K3 Challengers League	11 (6th in Group B)	25	8	6	11	49	50	−1	30	–	–	Kim Hee-Tae
2015	18	K3 League	15 (8th in Group A)	25	7	1	17	49	50	−16	22	–	–	Kim Hee-Tae
2016	20	K3 League	20th	19	1	0	18	13	64	6	3	–	–	Kim Hee-tae
2017	9	K3 Basic	9th	16	8	0	8	35	25	+10	24	–	–	Kim Hee-tae
2018	11	K3 Basic	11th	20	2	2	16	25	104	-79	8	–	–	Kim Hee-tae
