= Buyeo FC =

2015–2019 South Korean football club

Buyeo FC 부여 FC
- Full name: Buyeo Football Club
- Founded: 2015; 10 years ago
- Dissolved: 2019; 6 years ago
- Ground: Buyeo Stadium
- Owner: Yangpyeong City
- Chairman: Lee Yongwoo (Mayor of Yangpyeong)
- League: K3 League Basic
- 2018: 7th of 11
| Home colours | Away colours |

Buyeo Football Club (Korean: 부여 FC) was a South Korean football club based in the county of Buyeo. The club was a member of the K3 League, an semi-professional league and the fourth tier of league football in South Korea, since the 2016 season.

== Honours ==
=== Season-by-season records ===
| Season | Teams | Tier | Placement | Pld | W | D | L | GF | GA | GD | Pts | League Cup | FA Cup | Manager |
|---|---|---|---|---|---|---|---|---|---|---|---|---|---|---|
| 2016 | 20 | K3 League | 16th | 19 | 3 | 5 | 11 | 18 | 32 | -14 | 14 | – | – | Kang Jeong-hoon |
| 2017 | 9 | K3 Basic | 4th | 16 | 8 | 3 | 5 | 23 | 18 | +5 | 27 | – | – | Kang Jeong-hoon |
| 2018 | 11 | K3 Basic | 7th | 20 | 7 | 3 | 10 | 47 | 41 | +6 | 24 | – | – | Kang Jeong-hoon |

== See also ==
- List of football clubs in South Korea
