= Uijeongbu Sports Complex =

Sports venue in Uijeongbu, South Korea

Coordinates: 37°45′28.52″N 127°1′47.07″E

Uijeongbu Sports Complex is a multi-purpose stadium in Uijeongbu, South Korea. It is currently used mostly for football matches. The Uijeongbu Stadium has a capacity of 28,000 people.
