= List of South Korean football transfers winter 2013–14 =

This is a list of South Korean football transfers in the winter transfer window 2013–14.

== Transfers ==
Player	Position	Moving from	Moving to	Fee
Ahn Dong-eun (draft)	Defender	Goyang Hi FC	Ansan Police	Free
Ahn Jae-hoon (draft)	Defender	Daegu FC	Sangju Sangmu	Free
Ahn Jong-hun	Forward	Jeju United	Gwangju FC	
Ahn Yong-woo	Forward	Dong-Eui University	Jeonnam Dragons	Free
Ahn Young-gyu	Midfielder	Suwon Samsung Bluewings	Daejeon Citizen	
An Dong-hyeok	Midfielder	Gwangju FC		Free
An Jin-beom	Midfielder	FC Anyang	Ulsan Hyundai	
An Jin-beom	Midfielder	Korea University	FC Anyang	Free
An Young-jin	Defender	Bucheon FC 1995	Cheonan City	Free
(Australia) Adrian Madaschi	Defender	Jeju United		Free
(Australia) Aleksandar Jovanović	Defender	Suwon FC	Jeju United	
Back Dong-gyu	Defender	Dong-A University	FC Anyang	Free
Back Min-chul	Goalkeeper	Gyeongnam FC	Gwangju FC	Free
Bae In-young	Goalkeeper	Daegu FC		Free
Bae Ki-jong (loan)	Forward	Jeju United	Suwon Samsung Bluewings	
Bae Min-ho	Defender	Hanyang University	Goyang Hi FC	Free
Bae Se-hyun	Midfielder	Jeju Jeil High School	Jeju United	
Bae Seung-jin	Midfielder	(Japan) Yokohama FC	Incheon United	
Bae Su-han	Forward	Jeonnam Dragons		Free
Baek Ji-hoon (loan)	Midfielder	Suwon Samsung Bluewings	Ulsan Hyundai	
Bak Jae-cheol	Midfielder	Yongin City	Bucheon FC 1995	Free
(Belgium) Kevin Oris	Forward	Jeonbuk Hyundai Motors	(China) Liaoning Whowin	
(Bosnia and Herzegovina) Joco Stokić	Forward	(Bosnia and Herzegovina) Borac Banja Luka	Jeju United	
(Brazil) Adriano Michael Jackson	Forward	(Brazil) Atlético Goianiense	Daejeon Citizen	
(Brazil) Alessandro Lopes	Defender	Chungju Hummel		Free
(Brazil) Almir	Forward	Goyang Hi FC	Ulsan Hyundai	
(Brazil) Bruno Agnello	Midfielder	(Portugal) Moura AC	Bucheon FC 1995	
(Brazil) Diogo Acosta	Forward	Incheon United	(Brazil) São Bernardo	Free
(Brazil) Fábio Neves	Midfielder	(Brazil) Botafogo-PB	Gwangju FC	
(Brazil) Felipe Adão	Forward	(Brazil) XV de Piracicaba	FC Anyang	
(Brazil) Ivo	Midfielder	(Brazil) Criciúma	Incheon United	
(Brazil) João Paulo	Forward	Gwangju FC	Incheon United	Free
(Brazil) Joélson	Forward	(Brazil) Porto de Caruaru	Gangwon FC	
(Brazil) Kaio	Forward	(United Arab Emirates) Al Wasl	Jeonbuk Hyundai Motors	
(Brazil) Leandrinho	Midfielder	Daegu FC	Jeonnam Dragons	Free
(Brazil) Lúcio Curió	Forward	Gwangju FC	(Brazil) ABC	Free
(Brazil) Luizinho	Forward	Gwangju FC	(Thailand) Suphanburi	Free
(Brazil) Maranhão	Forward	Jeju United	(Kuwait) Al Qadsia	Free
(Brazil) Marcos Aurélio (loan)	Forward	(Brazil) Internacional	Jeonbuk Hyundai Motors	
(Brazil) Nilson Ricardo	Midfielder	(Japan) Sagan Tosu	Busan IPark	
(Brazil) Pedro Júnior	Forward	Jeju United	(Japan) Vissel Kobe	
(Brazil) Rafael Costa	Forward	(Brazil) Figueirense	FC Seoul	
(Brazil) Rafinha	Forward	(Brazil) Nacional-SP	Ulsan Hyundai	
(Brazil) Reiner Ferreira	Defender	(Portugal) Académica	Suwon Samsung Bluewings	
(Brazil) Rodrigo Leandro	Forward	Busan IPark	(Qatar) Muaither SC	Free
(Brazil) Rodrigo Paraná	Forward	(Brazil) São Bento	Bucheon FC 1995	
(Brazil) Rodriguinho	Forward	Jeju United	(Brazil) Linense	Free
(Brazil) Roger	Forward	(Brazil) Atlético Paranaense	Suwon Samsung Bluewings	
(Brazil) Romarinho	Forward	(Brazil) Botafogo-PB	Gwangju FC	
(Brazil) Roni	Midfielder	(Brazil) Taubaté	Goyang Hi FC	
(Brazil) Sandro Mendonça	Midfielder	Daegu FC	(Brazil) Operário	Free
(Brazil) Caíque Valdivia	Midfielder	(Brazil) ASA	Seongnam FC	
(Brazil) Wagner Querino	Forward	(Bahrain) Al Hidd	FC Anyang	
(Brazil) William	Midfielder	Busan IPark	(Mexico) Querétaro	Free
Byun Sung-hwan	Defender	FC Anyang		Free
Byun Woong	Midfielder	Ulsan Hyundai	Chungju Hummel	Free
Cha Joon-yeop	Defender	Chosun University	Suwon FC	
Cha Tae-young	Midfielder	University of Ulsan	Ulsan Hyundai	Free
Cheon Min-kwan	Defender	Bucheon FC 1995		Free
(Chile) Hugo Droguett	Midfielder	(Chile) Cobreloa	Jeju United	
Cho Jae-yong	Defender	Gyeongnam FC	Busan Transportation Corporation	Free
Cho Jin-soo	Forward	(Thailand) Ratchaburi	Suwon FC	
Cho Jun-hyun	Midfielder	Chungju Hummel	Jeju United	
Cho Jun-jae	Forward	Yongin City	Chungju Hummel	
Cho Kyum-son	Midfielder	Incheon United		Free
Cho Min-hyung	Midfielder	Jeonju Kijeon University	Suwon FC	
Cho Soo-chul	Midfielder	Seongnam FC	Incheon United	Free
Cho Sung-jin	Defender	(Japan) Consadole Sapporo	Suwon Samsung Bluewings	
Cho Won-deuk	Defender	Dankook University	Suwon Samsung Bluewings	Free
Cho Won-hee (loan)	Midfielder	(China) Wuhan Zall	Gyeongnam FC	
Cho Yong-min	Forward	Gwangju University	Suwon FC	Free
Cho Yong-tae	Forward	Suwon Samsung Bluewings	Gyeongnam FC	
Cho Young-jun	Midfielder	Konkuk University	Jeonbuk Hyundai Motors	Free
Choe Pil-su	Goalkeeper	Sungkyunkwan University	FC Anyang	Free
Choi Bo-kyung	Defender	Ulsan Hyundai	Jeonbuk Hyundai Motors	
Choi Bong-kyun	Midfielder	Hanyang University	Goyang Hi FC	Free
Choi Bong-won	Defender	FC Seoul		Free
Choi Bum-yong	Defender	Suwon FC		Free
Choi Geun-jong	Midfielder	Kwangmyeong Technical High School	Jeonbuk Hyundai Motors	Free
Choi Ho-jung (draft)	Midfielder	Daegu FC	Sangju Sangmu	Free
Choi In-hoo	Midfielder	Dongbuk High School	Gangwon FC	
Choi Jin-seok	Midfielder	Gimhae City	Bucheon FC 1995	Free
Choi Jin-soo	Midfielder	Ulsan Hyundai	FC Anyang	
Choi Jun-suck	Midfielder	FC Anyang	Gangneung City	Free
Choi Kyu-hwan	Goalkeeper	Chungju Hummel	Cheongju Jikji	Free
Choi Myeong-hun	Midfielder	Soongsil University	FC Seoul	
Choi Seung-ho	Defender	Yewon Arts University	Chungju Hummel	
Choi Sung-hwan	Defender	Ulsan Hyundai	Gwangju FC	
Choi Sung-min	Defender	Dongguk University	Gyeongnam FC	Free
Choi Tae-uk	Midfielder	FC Seoul	Ulsan Hyundai	Free
Choi Won-kwon	Defender	Jeju United	Gyeongju KHNP	Free
Choi Won-wook	Defender	FC Seoul		Free
Choi Woo-sun	Forward	Seongnam FC		Free
Chun Hong-suk	Goalkeeper	Ulsan Hyundai	Gangneung City	Free
Chun Tae-hyun (draft)	Goalkeeper	Jeju United	Ansan Police	Free
(Colombia) Julián Estiven Vélez	Midfielder	(Japan) Vissel Kobe	Jeju United	
(Croatia) Sandi Križman	Forward	(Croatia) Istra 1961	Jeonnam Dragons	
Don Ji-deok	Defender	FC Anyang	Gyeongju KHNP	
(Ghana) Derek Asamoah	Forward	Daegu FC		Free
Gil Young-tae	Defender	Kwandong University	Pohang Steelers	Free
Go Dae-woo	Midfielder	Paju Citizen	FC Anyang	
Gong Young-sun	Forward	Jeonnam Dragons	(Thailand) TOT	
Gwon Soon-gyu	Midfielder	Daejeon Citizen		Free
Ha Dae-sung	Midfielder	FC Seoul	(China) Beijing Guoan	
Ha Kang-jin	Goalkeeper	Gyeongnam FC		Free
Ha Sung-min	Midfielder	Jeonbuk Hyundai Motors	(Qatar) Muaither SC	Free
Han Deok-hee (draft)	Midfielder	Daejeon Citizen	Ansan Police	Free
Han Dong-won	Forward	Gangwon FC	(Indonesia) Persijap Jepara	Free
Han Eui-gwon	Forward	Kwandong University	Gyeongnam FC	Free
Han Geu-loo	Forward	Daejeon Citizen	Cheonan FC	Free
Han Hyo-hyuk	Midfielder	Gwangju FC	Goyang Citizen	Free
Han Jae-woong	Midfielder	Incheon United		Free
Han Ji-seong	Defender	International University of Korea	Ulsan Hyundai	Free
Han Kyo-won	Forward	Incheon United	Jeonbuk Hyundai Motors	
Han Kyung-in (draft)	Forward	Daejeon Citizen	Sangju Sangmu	Free
Han Sang-hak	Defender	Yongin City	Chungju Hummel	
Han Sang-hyuk	Goalkeeper	Pai Chai University	Daejeon Citizen	Free
Han Sang-hyun	Defender	Sungkyunkwan University	Bucheon FC 1995	Free
Han Suk-jong	Midfielder	Soongsil University	Gangwon FC	Free
Han Vit	Forward	Konkuk University	Goyang Hi FC	Free
Han Yoo-sung	Goalkeeper	Kyung Hee University	Jeonnam Dragons	Free
Han Young-gu	Defender	Goyang Hi FC	Gyeongju KHNP	
Heo Beom-san	Midfielder	Daejeon Citizen	Jeju United	
Heo Jae-won	Defender	Jeju United	Daegu FC	
Hong Dong-hyun	Midfielder	Soongsil University	Busan IPark	Free
Hong Joo-bin	Midfielder	Chungju Hummel		Free
Hong Sang-jun	Goalkeeper	Daejeon Citizen	Gangwon FC	Free
Hong Sun-man	Defender	Incheon United	Mokpo City	
Hong Tae-gon	Midfielder	Hongik University	Gwangju FC	
Hong Yo-sep	Midfielder	Cheonan City	Bucheon FC 1995	Free
Hou Jae-bum	Midfielder	Daejeon Citizen	Gyeongju Citizen	Free
Huh Young-suk (loan)	Midfielder	Gyeongnam FC	Gimhae City	
Hwang Hee-hoon	Goalkeeper	Goyang Hi FC		Free
Hwang Hun-hee	Forward	Gyeongju KHNP	Chungju Hummel	
Hwang Il-su	Forward	Daegu FC	Jeju United	
Hwang Jae-hoon	Midfielder	Gyeongnam FC		Free
Hwang Jae-won	Defender	Seongnam FC		Free
Hwang Ji-joon	Midfielder	Gwangju FC	Paju Citizen	Free
Hwang Jin-sung	Midfielder	Pohang Steelers		Free
Hwang Kyo-chung	Goalkeeper	Pohang Steelers	Gangwon FC	Free
Hwang Sun-bo	Forward	Jeonnam Dragons	Gyeongnam FC	Free
Hyun Young-min	Defender	Seongnam FC	Jeonnam Dragons	Free
Im Cha-min	Goalkeeper	Dongshin University	Chungju Hummel	
Im Yo-hwan	Defender	Gyeongnam FC		Free
Jang Baek-gyu	Forward	Sun Moon University	Daegu FC	Free
Jang Eun-kyu	Midfielder	Dankook University	Jeju United	
Jang Hyun-woo (draft)	Defender	FC Seoul	Sangju Sangmu	Free
Jang Jeong-hyun	Midfielder	Jeju United		Free
Jang Joo-seong	Forward	Pohang Steelers		Free
Jang Kyu-in	Midfielder	Ulsan Hyundai		Free
Jang Su-min	Midfielder	Daejeon Citizen		Free
Jang Won-seok (loan)	Defender	Jeju United	Daejeon Citizen	
(Japan) Yuta Baba	Midfielder	Daejeon Citizen		Free
Jeon Hyung-seop	Defender	Incheon United		Free
Jeon Jae-ho	Midfielder	Gangwon FC		Free
Jeon Jun-hyung	Defender	Incheon United	Gwangju FC	Free
Jeon Kwang-hwan	Defender	Jeonbuk Hyundai Motors		Free
Jeon Myung-keun	Forward	Gwangju FC	Yongin City	Free
Jeong Dong-ho	Defender	(Japan) Yokohama F. Marinos	Ulsan Hyundai	
Jeong Dong-jin	Midfielder	Gwangju FC	Goyang Citizen	Free
Jeong Hee-su	Midfielder	Korea University	Ulsan Hyundai	Free
Jeong Ho-jeong	Defender	Seongnam FC	Gwangju FC	
Jeong Hwuy	Defender	Daejeon Citizen	Chungbuk Cheongju	Free
Jeong Jong-hee	Midfielder	University of Ulsan	Jeonbuk Hyundai Motors	Free
Jeong Ju-il	Defender	Chosun University	Gyeongnam FC	Free
Jeong Jun-yeon (loan)	Defender	Jeonnam Dragons	Gwangju FC	
Jeong Jung-seok	Forward	Pohang Steelers	Mokpo City	Free
Jeong Shung-hoon	Forward	Gyeongnam FC	(Japan) Consadole Sapporo	Free
Ji Byeung-ju	Defender	Incheon National University	Daegu FC	
Jin Chang-su	Midfielder	Goyang Hi FC	Gyeongju KHNP	Free
Jin Kyung-sun	Defender	Gangwon FC		Free
Jo Chul-in (loan)	Defender	Suwon Samsung Bluewings	FC Anyang	
Jo Jae-cheol (draft)	Midfielder	Gyeongnam FC	Ansan Police	Free
Jo Jae-cheol (draft)	Midfielder	Gyeongnam FC	Ansan Police	Free
Jo Woo-jin	Midfielder	Daegu FC	Cheonan City	Free
Joo Hyun-tak	Defender	Kyonggi University	Jeonbuk Hyundai Motors	Free
Joo Ik-seong	Forward	FC Seoul	Daejeon Citizen	Free
Joo Sung-hwan	Forward	Jeonnam Dragons	(Thailand) Singhtarua	Free
Jun Sang-hoon	Defender	Ansan Police	Gyeongnam FC	
Jun Sang-won	Midfielder	Daejeon Citizen		Free
Jung Chan-il	Midfielder	Dongguk University	Ulsan Hyundai	Free
Jung Da-hwon	Defender	Gyeongnam FC	Jeju United	
Jung Dae-kyo	Forward	Yeungnam University	Daegu FC	
Jung Dae-sun	Forward	Gyeongnam FC	FC Anyang	Free
Jung Dong-cheol	Forward	Kyung Hee University	FC Seoul	
Jung Eui-do	Goalkeeper	Suwon FC	Seoul United	Free
Jung Hae-gwon	Midfielder	Chodang University	Incheon United	Free
Jung Hong-youn	Defender	Jeonnam Dragons	Bucheon FC 1995	Free
Jung Hun-chan	Midfielder	Goyang Hi FC		Free
Jung Hun-sik	Defender	Hanyang University	Gangwon FC	Free
Jung Jae-won	Forward	Jeonbuk Hyundai Motors	Cheonan FC	Free
Jung Ji-an	Forward	Seongnam FC		Free
Jung Keun-hee	Defender	Jeonnam Dragons	Chungju Hummel	Free
Jung Kyu-min	Goalkeeper	Seohae High School	Goyang Hi FC	Free
Jung Kyung-ho	Midfielder	Gwangju FC	Hyundai Mipo Dockyard	Free
Jung Min-woo	Forward	Honam University	Suwon FC	Free
Jung Sung-jo	Defender	FC Anyang	Paju Citizen	Free
Jung Sung-min	Forward	Gyeongnam FC	Chungju Hummel	Free
Jung Woo-in	Defender	Gwangju FC	Gangwon FC	Free
Jung Yeon-woong	Midfielder	Daejeon Citizen	(Germany) Hessen Kassel	Free
Jung Young-il	Forward	Yewon Arts University	FC Anyang	
Kang Hoon	Goalkeeper	Kwangwoon University	Bucheon FC 1995	Free
Kang Ji-baek	Defender	Chungju Hummel		Free
Kang Ji-yong	Defender	Gyeongju Citizen	Bucheon FC 1995	
Kang Jong-guk (draft)	Forward	Gyeongnam FC	Ansan Police	Free
Kang Ju-ho	Midfielder	Chungju Hummel	Gyeongju KHNP	Free
Kang Ki-hoon (loan)	Forward	Pohang Steelers	Gimhae City	
Kang Kyung-won	Midfielder	Jeonbuk Hyundai Motors		Free
Kang Min	Defender	Gwangju FC	Mokpo City	Free
Kang Sang-woo	Midfielder	Kyung Hee University	Pohang Steelers	Free
Kang Seong-ho	Defender	Hanzhong University	FC Anyang	Free
Kang Seung-jo	Midfielder	Gyeongnam FC	FC Seoul	
Kang Sung-kwan	Goalkeeper	Seongnam FC	Gangwon FC	Free
Kang Yong	Defender	Incheon United		Free
Kang Young-yeon	Defender	Incheon United	Gangneung City	Free
Keum Kyo-jin	Defender	Yeungnam University	Daegu FC	Free
Kim Bong-jin	Midfielder	Gangwon FC	Incheon United	Free
Kim Byung-oh	Forward	FC Anyang	Daejeon Korail	
Kim Byung-suk (draft)	Midfielder	Daejeon Citizen	Ansan Police	Free
Kim Chan-hee	Forward	Pohang Steelers	Daejeon Citizen	
Kim Chan-young	Defender	(Japan) Tonan Maebashi	Busan IPark	Free
Kim Chang-dae	Forward	Chungju Hummel	Gyeongju KHNP	Free
Kim Chang-hoon (draft)	Defender	Incheon United	Sangju Sangmu	Free
Kim Chang-hun	Defender	(Japan) Cerezo Osaka	Suwon FC	Free
Kim Da-bin	Forward	Chungju Hummel	Hwaseong FC	Free
Kim Dae-joong	Defender	Hongik University	Incheon United	Free
Kim Dae-san	Defender	Gangwon FC		Free
Kim Deok-soo	Goalkeeper	Bucheon FC 1995		Free
Kim Do-hyeok	Midfielder	Yonsei University	Incheon United	Free
Kim Dong-geon	Midfielder	Suwon FC		Free
Kim Dong-ho	Defender	Gangwon FC	Seoul United	Free
Kim Dong-hwi	Defender	FC Anyang		Free
Kim Dong-hyeok	Defender	Daejeon Citizen		Free
Kim Dong-jin	Defender	Ajou University	Daegu FC	Free
Kim Dong-seok	Midfielder	Ulsan Hyundai	FC Seoul	
Kim Dong-suk	Midfielder	Ulsan Hyundai	FC Seoul	
Kim Dong-wuk	Midfielder	Chungju Hummel		Free
Kim Eun-do	Goalkeeper	FC Seoul	Chungju Hummel	Free
Kim Eun-jung	Forward	Gangwon FC	Daejeon Citizen	Free
Kim Eun-sun	Midfielder	Gwangju FC	Suwon Samsung Bluewings	
Kim Geyong-min (draft)	Defender	Incheon United	Sangju Sangmu	Free
Kim Hak-chan	Midfielder	Hongik University	Ulsan Hyundai	Free
Kim Han-bin	Defender	Sun Moon University	Chungju Hummel	Free
Kim Hun-sung	Midfielder	Korea University	Ulsan Hyundai	Free
Kim Hyeong-rok	Goalkeeper	Dong-A University	Jeju United	Free
Kim Hyeung-bum	Midfielder	Gyeongnam FC		Free
Kim Hyuk-jin	Midfielder	Kyung Hee University	Suwon FC	Free
Kim Hyun	Forward	Jeonbuk Hyundai Motors	Jeju United	
Kim In-sung	Midfielder	Seongnam FC	Jeonbuk Hyundai Motors	Free
Kim Jae-hoon	Defender	Gangneung City	Chungju Hummel	
Kim Jae-hwan	Defender	Jeonbuk Hyundai Motors	Suwon FC	Free
Kim Jae-woong (loan)	Forward	Incheon United	FC Anyang	
Kim Jee-wong	Midfielder	Busan IPark	FC Pocheon	Free
Kim Ji-min	Midfielder	Suwon FC		Free
Kim Ji-sung	Goalkeeper	Gwangju FC	Cheonan City	Free
Kim Ji-woong (draft)	Defender	Seongnam FC	Sangju Sangmu	Free
Kim Jin-hwan	Defender	Gangwon FC	Incheon United	
Kim Jin-yong	Forward	Gangwon FC	(Malaysia) Negeri Sembilan	Free
Kim Jin-young	Goalkeeper	Konkuk University	Pohang Steelers	Free
Kim Jong-gook	Midfielder	Ulsan Hyundai	Daejeon Citizen	
Kim Jong-seong	Midfielder	Suwon FC	FC Anyang	Free
Kim Joo-bin	Defender	Incheon United	Daegu FC	Free
Kim Ju-hyoung	Forward	Suwon City	Chungju Hummel	
Kim Jun-hwan	Forward	(Japan) FC Korea	Gyeongnam FC	Free
Kim Jun-yeop	Midfielder	Gwangju FC	Gyeongnam FC	
Kim Jung-bin	Midfielder	Pohang Steelers	Suwon FC	Free
Kim Jung-hun	Forward	Kwandong University	Chungju Hummel	Free
Kim Jung-joo	Forward	Gangwon FC	Gangneung City	Free
Kim Kang-hyun	Midfielder	Daejeon Citizen		Free
Kim Kang-min	Defender	Jeonbuk Hyundai Motors	FC Pocheon	Free
Kim Keun-bae (draft)	Goalkeeper	Gangwon FC	Sangju Sangmu	Free
Kim Kun-hoan	Defender	(Japan) Albirex Niigata	Ulsan Hyundai	
Kim Kyeong-min	Goalkeeper	Hanyang University	Jeju United	Free
Kim Kyo-bin	Goalkeeper	Incheon United		Free
Kim Kyung-min (draft)	Defender	Incheon United	Sangju Sangmu	Free
Kim Min-ho	Midfielder	Bucheon FC 1995	Gyeongju KHNP	Free
Kim Min-joong	Midfielder	Daejeon Citizen		Free
Kim Min-ki	Midfielder	Hyundai Mipo Dockyard	Suwon FC	
Kim Min-kyun	Midfielder	(Japan) Fagiano Okayama	Ulsan Hyundai	
Kim Min-soo	Forward	Gyeongnam FC	Gwangju FC	
Kim Moon-ju	Midfielder	Daejeon Citizen		Free
Kim Moon-soo	Defender	Gangwon FC	Gangneung City	Free
Kim Myeong-kyu	Defender	Bucheon FC 1995		Free
Kim Myung-woon	Forward	Incheon United		Free
Kim Nam-il	Midfielder	Incheon United	Jeonbuk Hyundai Motors	Free
Kim Pyoung-jin	Midfielder	Daejeon Citizen	Hyundai Mipo Dockyard	Free
Kim Ryun-do	Midfielder	Kwangwoon University	Bucheon FC 1995	Free
Kim Sang-pil	Defender	FC Seoul	Daejeon Citizen	Free
Kim Sang-rok	Midfielder	Bucheon FC 1995		Free
Kim Sang-won	Midfielder	University of Ulsan	Jeju United	
Kim Seo-jun	Midfielder	Ulsan Hyundai	Suwon FC	
Kim Seong-eun	Defender	Sun Moon University	Incheon United	Free
Kim Seul-gi	Forward	Jeonju University	Gyeongnam FC	Free
Kim Seung-yong	Midfielder	Ulsan Hyundai	(Australia) Central Coast Mariners	Free
Kim Shin-chul (draft)	Midfielder	Bucheon FC 1995	Ansan Police	Free
Kim Shin-young	Forward	Jeonbuk Hyundai Motors	Busan IPark	Free
Kim Soo-beom	Defender	Gwangju FC	Jeju United	
Kim Sun-min	Midfielder	Hyundai Mipo Dockyard	Ulsan Hyundai	Free
Kim Sun-woo (1983)	Forward	Seongnam FC		Free
Kim Sun-woo (1986)	Defender	Suwon FC		Free
Kim Sung-jin	Defender	Gwangju FC	FC Pocheon	Free
Kim Sung-kuk	Defender	FC Anyang		Free
Kim Sung-min (1985)	Forward	Gwangju FC	Chungju Hummel	
Kim Sung-min (1989)	Midfielder	Chungju Hummel	Jungnang Chorus Mustang	Free
Kim Tae-jun (1990)	Forward	Honam University	Incheon United	Free
Kim Tae-jun (1989) (draft)	Midfielder	Goyang Hi FC	Gimpo Citizen	Free
Kim Tae-yeon	Midfielder	Daejeon Citizen	(China) Shenyang Zhongze	
Kim Tae-yoon	Defender	Incheon United		Free
Kim U-hyeon	Defender	Korea University	FC Seoul	Free
Kim Woo-chul	Midfielder	Jeonbuk Hyundai Motors	Gwangju FC	Free
Kim Woo-jin	Midfielder	Bucheon FC 1995		Free
Kim Yong-chan	Defender	Gyeongnam FC	Incheon United	Free
Kim Yong-han	Midfielder	Suwon FC		Free
Kim Yoon-jae	Defender	Hongik University	Daejeon Citizen	Free
Kim You-sung	Midfielder	Daegu FC	Gwangju FC	
Kim Young-bin (1984)	Midfielder	Daejeon Citizen	Gyeongnam FC	Free
Kim Young-bin (1991)	Defender	Gwangju University	Gwangju FC	Free
Kim Young-chan (loan)	Defender	Jeonbuk Hyundai Motors	Suwon FC	
Kim Young-kwang (loan)	Goalkeeper	Ulsan Hyundai	Gyeongnam FC	
Kim Young-nam	Forward	FC Anyang	Gyeongju KHNP	
Kim Young-seung	Midfielder	Howon University	Daejeon Citizen	Free
Kim Young-woo	Midfielder	Jeonbuk Hyundai Motors	Jeonnam Dragons	
Kim Young-yun	Defender	Gangwon FC		Free
Kim Yun-sik	Midfielder	Kyung Hee University	Ulsan Hyundai	Free
Ko Bo-yeon	Midfielder	Ajou University	Bucheon FC 1995	Free
Koo Dae-young	Defender	Hongik University	FC Anyang	Free
Kwak Hae-seong	Defender	Kwangwoon University	Seongnam FC	Free
Kwak Hee-ju	Defender	Suwon Samsung Bluewings	(Japan) FC Tokyo	Free
Kwak Jae-min	Defender	Hannam University	Daejeon Citizen	Free
Kwak Jeong-sool	Forward	Goyang Hi FC	Gangneung City	Free
Kwak Rae-seung	Forward	Cheonan City	Bucheon FC 1995	Free
Kwon Hyuk-kwan	Midfielder	Chungju Hummel	Jungnang Chorus Mustang	Free
Kwon Hyun-min	Defender	Daegu University	Chungju Hummel	
Kwon Soo-hyun	Midfielder	Ajou University	Gwangju FC	Free
Kwon Soon-hyung (draft)	Midfielder	Jeju United	Sangju Sangmu	Free
Kwon Soon-yong	Midfielder	Jeonbuk Hyundai Motors	Gangwon FC	Free
Kwon Tae-ahn	Goalkeeper	Gyeongnam FC	Seongnam FC	Free
Kwon Wan-kyu	Defender	Sungkyunkwan University	Gyeongnam FC	Free
Kwon Yong-nam	Defender	Gwangju FC		Free
Kwon Youn-cheol	Defender	Goyang Hi FC	Chungbuk Cheongju	Free
Kyung Jae-yoon	Midfielder	FC Seoul	Bucheon FC 1995	Free
Lee Bo-hwi	Midfielder	Daejeon Citizen	Cheonan FC	Free
Lee Bong-jun	Midfielder	Gangwon FC	Gangneung City	Free
Lee Chan-dong	Midfielder	Incheon National University	Gwangju FC	Free
Lee Chang-ho	Midfielder	Suwon FC	Hwaseong FC	Free
Lee Chang-min	Midfielder	Chung-ang University	Bucheon FC 1995	Free
Lee Chang-min (loan)	Midfielder	Bucheon FC 1995	Gyeongnam FC	
Lee Chi-joon	Defender	Seongnam FC	Suwon FC	Free
Lee Dae-myung	Midfielder	Incheon United		Free
Lee Dong-woo	Defender	Chungju Hummel		Free
Lee Hak-min	Defender	Sangji University	Gyeongnam FC	Free
Lee Hee-hyun	Goalkeeper	Cheonan City	Bucheon FC 1995	Free
Lee Ho-seok	Forward	Chungju Hummel	Gyeongnam FC	
Lee Ho-seok	Forward	Dongguk University	Chungju Hummel	Free
Lee Hoo-kwon (draft)	Midfielder	Bucheon FC 1995	Sangju Sangmu	Free
Lee Hoon	Defender	Ajou University	Goyang Hi FC	
Lee Hui-chan (loan)	Defender	Pohang Steelers	Goyang Hi FC	
Lee Hwi-soo	Goalkeeper	Jeonnam Dragons	Gangneung City	Free
Lee Hyeon-do	Midfielder	Busan IPark		Free
Lee Hyun-ho	Forward	Seongnam FC	Jeju United	Free
Lee Hyun-jin	Forward	Jeju United	(Thailand) Chainat	Free
Lee Hyun-min	Defender	Chungju Hummel	Hwaseong FC	Free
Lee In-kyu	Forward	Nambu University	Jeonnam Dragons	Free
Lee In-sik	Forward	Chung-ang University	Daejeon Citizen	
Lee Jae-kwon (draft)	Midfielder	FC Seoul	Ansan Police	Free
Lee Jae-min (loan)	Midfielder	Gyeongnam FC	Gimhae City	
Lee Jae-seung	Midfielder	Cheongju University	Bucheon FC 1995	Free
Lee Jae-sung	Midfielder	Korea University	Jeonbuk Hyundai Motors	Free
Lee Jae-won	Goalkeeper	Nambu University	Chungju Hummel	
Lee Ji-nam	Defender	Daegu FC	(China) Henan Jianye	
Lee Jin-gyu	Goalkeeper	Gimhae City	Gyeongnam FC	
Lee Jin-ho	Forward	Daegu FC	Gwangju FC	Free
Lee Jin-jae	Midfielder	Bucheon FC 1995	Busan Transportation Corporation	Free
Lee Jong-min	Defender	Suwon Samsung Bluewings	Gwangju FC	Free
Lee Ju-yong	Midfielder	Dong-A University	Jeonbuk Hyundai Motors	Free
Lee Jun-ho	Midfielder	Hongik University	Chungju Hummel	Free
Lee Jun-hyeong	Defender	Myongji University	FC Seoul	Free
Lee June-sik	Goalkeeper	Nambu University	Ulsan Hyundai	Free
Lee Jung-heon	Defender	Suwon FC	Gyeongju KHNP	Free
Lee Jung-hwan (1991)	Defender	Soongsil University	Busan IPark	Free
Lee Jung-hwan (1988)	Defender	Gyeongnam FC	Changwon City	Free
Lee Jung-ki (draft)	Forward	Busan IPark	Sangju Sangmu	Free
Lee Keun-pyo	Goalkeeper	Gangwon FC		Free
Lee Kook-ho	Forward	Daejeon Citizen		Free
Lee Kwang-jin	Midfielder	FC Seoul	Daejeon Citizen	
Lee Kyeong-su	Midfielder	University of Suwon	Bucheon FC 1995	Free
Lee Min-woo	Forward	Gwangju University	Seongnam FC	Free
Lee Myung-jae	Defender	Hongik University	Ulsan Hyundai	Free
Lee Sang-hee	Defender	Daejeon Citizen	Incheon United	
Lee Sang-ho	Defender	Jeonnam Dragons	(Thailand) Singhtarua	Free
Lee Sang-hyup	Forward	Jeju United	Jeonbuk Hyundai Motors	
Lee Sang-ki	Goalkeeper	Suwon Samsung Bluewings	Suwon FC	Free
Lee Sang-won	Midfielder	Ajou University	FC Anyang	
Lee Sang-woo (draft)	Defender	FC Anyang	FC Pocheon	Free
Lee Sang-wook	Goalkeeper	Mokpo City	Suwon Samsung Bluewings	Free
Lee Seul-gi	Midfielder	Daejeon Citizen	Hwaseong FC	Free
Lee Seung-hyun	Defender	Gangwon FC	Chungju Hummel	Free
Lee Seung-kyu	Goalkeeper	FC Seoul	Gwangju FC	Free
Lee Seung-kyu	Goalkeeper	FC Seoul	Gwangju FC	Free
Lee Seung-yeoul	Forward	Seongnam FC	Jeonbuk Hyundai Motors	
Lee Soon-seok	Midfielder	Bucheon FC 1995		Free
Lee Sung-jae	Forward	Suwon FC	Goyang Hi FC	Free
Lee Sung-woon	Midfielder	Busan IPark		Free
Lee Wan	Defender	Ulsan Hyundai	Gwangju FC	
Lee Wan-hee (loan)	Forward	FC Anyang	Chungju Hummel	
Lee Woong-hee	Defender	Daejeon Citizen	FC Seoul	
Lee Yong-rae (draft)	Midfielder	Suwon Samsung Bluewings	Ansan Police	Free
Lee Yoon-eui	Defender	Bucheon FC 1995		Free
Lee Youn-kyu	Goalkeeper	Chungju Hummel		Free
Lee Young-duk	Midfielder	Chungju Hummel		Free
Lim Chang-kyun	Midfielder	Bucheon FC 1995	Gyeongnam FC	
Lim Dong-cheon	Defender	Korea University	Ulsan Hyundai	Free
Lim Ha-ram	Defender	Gwangju FC	Incheon United	
Lim Jin-wook	Midfielder	Dongguk University	Chungju Hummel	Free
Lim Jong-wook	Midfielder	Chungju Hummel	Changwon City	Free
Lim Tae-sup	Forward	Chungju Hummel		Free
Ma Hyun-jun	Midfielder	FC Anyang		Free
Ma Sang-hoon	Defender	(Thailand) BBCU	Jeonnam Dragons	
Mo Kyung-joo	Midfielder	Jeonbuk Hyundai Motors		Free
(Montenegro) Bogdan Milić	Forward	Suwon FC	(Montenegro) Rudar	Free
(Montenegro) Dejan Damjanović	Forward	FC Seoul	(China) Jiangsu Sainty	
(Montenegro) Dženan Radončić	Forward	Suwon Samsung Bluewings	(Japan) Omiya Ardija	
(Montenegro) Stefan Nikolić	Forward	(Romania) Steaua București	Incheon United	
Moon Byung-woo	Midfielder	Gangwon FC	Daejeon Korail	Free
Moon Dong-ju (loan)	Midfielder	FC Seoul	(Japan) Ehime FC	
Moon Gyu-hyun	Midfielder	Pohang Steelers	Yongin City	Free
Moon Jeong-joo	Midfielder	Chungju Hummel	Chungbuk Cheongju	Free
Nam Dae-sik (loan)	Defender	Chungju Hummel	FC Anyang	
Nam Se-in	Midfielder	Dong-Eui University	Daegu FC	
Namgung Woong	Defender	Gangwon FC		Free
Namkung Do	Forward	FC Anyang		Free
No Byung-jun	Forward	Pohang Steelers	Daegu FC	Free
No Dong-geon	Goalkeeper	Korea University	Suwon Samsung Bluewings	Free
No Yeon-bin	Defender	Cheonan City	Chungju Hummel	Free
(North Macedonia) Stevica Ristić (loan)	Forward	(Croatia) Inter Zaprešić	Jeonnam Dragons	
O Jei-hun	Defender	Yongho High School	Gyeongnam FC	
Oh Jong-cheol	Defender	Chungju Hummel		Free
Oh Ju-hyun	Midfielder	Jeju United	Hwaseong FC	Free
Oh Min-yeob	Defender	Chungju Hummel		Free
Oh Se-gil	Midfielder	Sehan University	FC Anyang	Free
Oh Se-ryong	Midfielder	Hwaseong FC	Suwon FC	
Oh Tae-hwan	Defender	FC Pocheon	Chungju Hummel	Free
Park Byung-won	Midfielder	FC Anyang	Goyang Hi FC	Free
Park Dae-han	Defender	Sungkyunkwan University	Gangwon FC	
Park Dong-hyuk	Forward	Ulsan Hyundai	Cheonan City	Free
Park Dong-shin	Forward	Gangwon FC		Free
Park Geon-hee	Goalkeeper	Bucheon FC 1995		Free
Park Gyung-ik (draft)	Midfielder	Ulsan Hyundai	Sangju Sangmu	Free
Park Hee-do (draft)	Midfielder	Jeonbuk Hyundai Motors	Ansan Police	Free
Park Hee-sung (1987)	Midfielder	Gwangju FC	Seongnam FC	Free
Park Hee-sung (1990)	Defender	Jungnang Chorus Mustang	Chungju Hummel	Free
Park Ho-jin	Goalkeeper	Gangwon FC		Free
Park Hyun	Midfielder	Gwangju FC	Cheonan City	Free
Park Hyun-bem (draft)	Midfielder	Suwon Samsung Bluewings	Ansan Police	Free
Park Im-soo	Midfielder	Suwon FC	Gimhae City	Free
Park Jae-bum	Forward	Gangwon FC	Chungju Hummel	
Park Jae-seong	Defender	Daegu University	Seongnam FC	Free
Park Jeong-min	Forward	Gwangju FC	Yongin City	Free
Park Ji-su	Defender	Incheon United	Uijeongbu FC	Free
Park Ji-young (draft)	Goalkeeper	FC Anyang	Sangju Sangmu	Free
Park Jin-ok	Defender	Daejeon Citizen	Gwangju FC	Free
Park Jong-in	Forward	Gwangju FC		Free
Park Jong-oh	Defender	Hanyang University	Bucheon FC 1995	Free
Park Jong-woo	Midfielder	Busan IPark	(China) Guangzhou R&F	
Park Jun-hui	Defender	Konkuk University	Pohang Steelers	Free
Park Jun-hyuk	Goalkeeper	Jeju United	Seongnam FC	
Park Jung-hoon	Midfielder	Jeonnam Dragons		Free
Park Kyung-min	Midfielder	Jeonnam Dragons		Free
Park Kyung-wan	Midfielder	Gyeongju KHNP	Bucheon FC 1995	Free
Park Min	Defender	Gangwon FC	FC Anyang	Free
Park Min-sun	Goalkeeper	Yong In University	Daegu FC	Free
Park Sang-hee	Midfielder	Seongnam FC	Yongin City	Free
Park Se-hwan	Defender	Hyundai Mipo Dockyard	Chungju Hummel	
Park Seung-il (draft)	Forward	Ulsan Hyundai	Sangju Sangmu	Free
Park Seung-ryeol	Midfielder	FC Seoul		Free
Park Soung-jun	Midfielder	Jeonju University	Bucheon FC 1995	Free
Park Su-chang	Midfielder	Chungju Hummel	Jeju United	Free
Park Sung-ho (1982)	Forward	Pohang Steelers	(Japan) Yokohama FC	Free
Park Sung-ho (1992)	Defender	Ulsan Hyundai	Hyundai Mipo Dockyard	Free
Park Sung-yong	Defender	Dankook University	Daegu FC	Free
Park Tae-soo	Defender	Daejeon Citizen	Chungju Hummel	Free
Park Tae-youn	Defender	Chung-ang University	Ulsan Hyundai	Free
Park Yong-ho	Defender	Busan IPark		Free
Park Yong-joon (loan)	Midfielder	Suwon Samsung Bluewings	Bucheon FC 1995	
Rim Chang-woo (loan)	Defender	Ulsan Hyundai	Daejeon Citizen	
Roh Young-gyun	Midfielder	FC Seoul		Free
(Romania) Ciprian Vasilache	Midfielder	(Ukraine) Vorskla Poltava	Gangwon FC	
(Romania) Ianis Zicu	Midfielder	Gangwon FC	(Romania) Petrolul Ploiești	Free
Ryu Seung-woo	Forward	Chung-ang University	Jeju United	Free
Ryu Seung-woo (loan)	Forward	Jeju United	(Germany) Bayer Leverkusen	
Ryu Won-woo (loan)	Goalkeeper	Jeonnam Dragons	Gwangju FC	
Seo Bo-min	Midfielder	Kwandong University	Gangwon FC	Free
Seo Dong-hyeon (draft)	Forward	Jeju United	Ansan Police	Free
Seo Dong-wook	Forward	Bucheon FC 1995	Gimhae City	Free
Seo Sang-min (draft)	Midfielder	Jeonbuk Hyundai Motors	Sangju Sangmu	Free
Seo Seung-hoon	Midfielder	Joongwon University	Daejeon Citizen	Free
(Serbia) Milan Bubalo	Midfielder	Gyeongnam FC	(Thailand) Muangthong United	Free
(Serbia) Miloš Stojanović	Forward	(China) Wuhan Zall	Gyeongnam FC	
(Serbia) Nikola Komazec	Forward	(Bosnia and Herzegovina) FK Sarajevo	Busan IPark	
Shin Chang-moo	Midfielder	Woosuk University	Daegu FC	
Shin Dong-hyuk	Midfielder	Incheon United	Daejeon Citizen	Free
Shin Hak-young	Midfielder	FC Seoul		Free
Shin Ho-eun	Defender	Yeungnam University	Bucheon FC 1995	Free
Shin Yeon-soo	Midfielder	Suwon Samsung Bluewings	Busan IPark	
Sim Sang-min	Defender	Chung-ang University	FC Seoul	Free
Son Dae-ho	Midfielder	Incheon United	(China) Hangzhou Greentown	Free
Son Guk-hoe	Defender	Chungju Hummel	Gyeongju KHNP	Free
Son Jae-young (loan)	Midfielder	Hyundai Mipo Dockyard	Ulsan Hyundai	
Son Jeong-hyun	Goalkeeper	Gwangju University	Gyeongnam FC	Free
Son Jun-ho	Midfielder	Yeungnam University	Pohang Steelers	
Song Byung-yong	Defender	Hannam University	FC Anyang	
Song Chang-ho	Midfielder	Daegu FC	Jeonnam Dragons	
Song Han-bok	Defender	Daegu FC	Gwangju FC	
Song Ho-young	Forward	Jeju United	Gyeongnam FC	Free
Song Je-heon (draft)	Forward	Jeonbuk Hyundai Motors	Sangju Sangmu	Free
Song Ju-han	Defender	Incheon National University	Daejeon Citizen	Free
Song Seung-min	Midfielder	Incheon National University	Gwangju FC	Free
Song Su-yeong	Forward	Yonsei University	Gyeongnam FC	Free
(Spain) Osmar Barba	Defender	(Thailand) Buriram United	FC Seoul	
Suh Myeong-won	Forward	Shinpyeong High School	Daejeon Citizen	Free
Suk Dong-woo	Defender	Yong In University	Bucheon FC 1995	Free
Sun Seung-woo	Forward	Korea University	Busan IPark	Free
(Timor-Leste) Diogo Rangel	Defender	(Indonesia) Sriwijaya	Daejeon Citizen	
Won Tae-yeon	Defender	Sungkyunkwan University	Gyeongnam FC	Free
Won Tae-yeon (loan)	Defender	Gyeongnam FC	(China) Yanbian Baekdu Tigers	
Woo Ju-sung	Defender	Chung-ang University	Gyeongnam FC	Free
Yang Dong-won	Goalkeeper	Suwon Samsung Bluewings	Gangwon FC	Free
Yang Hyung-mo	Goalkeeper	Chungbuk National University	Suwon Samsung Bluewings	Free
Yang Se-woon	Midfielder	Gwangju FC		Free
Yeom Ho-deok	Midfielder	FC Anyang		Free
Yong Hyun-jin	Defender	Seongnam FC	Incheon United	
Yoo Chung-youn	Defender	Kyung Hee University	Seongnam FC	Free
Yoo Dae-hyun	Defender	(Japan) Tochigi SC	Bucheon FC 1995	Free
Yoo Ho-joon (draft)	Midfielder	Gyeongnam FC	Ansan Police	Free
Yoo Jae-ho	Midfielder	Incheon United	Gimpo Citizen	Free
Yoo Jong-hyun	Defender	Gwangju FC	Chungju Hummel	Free
Yoo Jun-soo	Defender	Gyeongju KHNP	Ulsan Hyundai	
Yoo Kyoung-youl	Defender	Daegu FC	Cheonan City	Free
Yoo Man-kee	Midfielder	Goyang Hi FC	Gyeongju KHNP	Free
Yoon Dong-gyu	Forward	Jeonbuk Hyundai Motors		Free
Yoon Jun-ha (draft)	Forward	Daejeon Citizen	Ansan Police	Free
Yoon Sang-ho	Midfielder	Honam University	Incheon United	Free
Yoon Seung-hyeon	Midfielder	FC Seoul	(Croatia) Istra 1961	Free
Yoon Sin-young	Defender	Gyeongnam FC	(China) Jiangsu Sainty	
You Sung-ki	Midfielder	Yonsei University	Daejeon Citizen	Free
Youm Yu-shin	Midfielder	Sun Moon University	Seongnam FC	
Youn Sung-woo	Midfielder	FC Seoul	Gangneung City	Free
Yu Je-ho	Forward	Ajou University	Pohang Steelers	
Yun Gi-hae	Goalkeeper	Gwangju FC	Yongin City	Free
Yun Jeong-kyu	Goalkeeper	Myongji University	Busan IPark	Free
Yun Ju-tae	Midfielder	(Germany) FSV Frankfurt	FC Seoul	Free
