= 2020 K League 2 =

Eighth season of the K League 2, the second tier South Korean professional league

Hana 1Q K League 2
- Season: 2020
- Dates: 9 May – 21 November 2020
- Champions: Jeju United (1st title)
- Promoted: Jeju United; Suwon FC
- Matches: 119
- Goals: 288 (2.42 per match)
- Best player: An Byong-jun
- Top goalscorer: An Byong-jun (21 goals)
- Biggest home win: Jeju 4–0 Bucheon (26 August 2020)
- Biggest away win: Chungnam Asan 0–5 Suwon FC (24 May 2020)
- Highest scoring: Suwon FC 3–4 Jeonnam (18 September 2020)
- Longest winning run: 3 matches Suwon FC
- Longest unbeaten run: 4 matches Daejeon Hana Citizen; Jeonnam Dragons
- Longest winless run: 4 matches Chungnam Asan; Seoul E-Land

The 2020 K League 2 was the eighth season of the K League 2, the second-tier South Korean professional football league. The champions and the winners of the promotion play-offs could be promoted to the K League 1. The second, third and fourth-placed teams qualified for the promotion play-offs.

On 24 April 2020, the K League Federation confirmed that they reduced the number of matchdays to 27.

== Teams ==
=== Team changes ===
The Asan government made new football club Chungnam Asan to replace its former club Asan Mugunghwa, which was dissolved before the season.

Relegated from K League 1

- Gyeongnam FC
- Jeju United

Promoted to K League 1

- Gwangju FC
- Busan IPark

Newly joined

- Chungnam Asan

Withdrawn

- Asan Mugunghwa

=== Locations ===
Hana Financial Group took over Daejeon Citizen, and renamed the team Daejeon Hana Citizen.

Team	City/Province	Abbreviation
Ansan Greeners	Ansan	Ansan
Bucheon FC 1995	Bucheon	Bucheon
Chungnam Asan	Asan	Chungnam Asan
Daejeon Hana Citizen	Daejeon	Daejeon
FC Anyang	Anyang	Anyang
Gyeongnam FC	Gyeongnam	Gyeongnam
Jeju United	Jeju	Jeju
Jeonnam Dragons	Jeonnam	Jeonnam
Seoul E-Land	Seoul	Seoul E
Suwon FC	Suwon	Suwon FC

=== Stadiums ===
Ansan Greeners	Bucheon FC 1995	Chungnam Asan	Daejeon Hana Citizen	FC Anyang
Ansan Wa~ Stadium	Bucheon Stadium	Yi Sun-sin Stadium	Daejeon World Cup Stadium	Anyang Stadium
Capacity: **35,000**	Capacity: **34,456**	Capacity: **17,376**	Capacity: **40,535**	Capacity: **17,143**
Gyeongnam FC	Jeju United	Jeonnam Dragons	Seoul E-Land	Suwon FC
Changwon Football Center	Jeju World Cup Stadium	Gwangyang Stadium	Seoul Olympic Stadium	Suwon Sports Complex
Capacity: **15,074**	Capacity: **35,657**	Capacity: **13,496**	Capacity: **69,950**	Capacity: **11,808**

=== Personnel and sponsoring ===
Team	Manager	Kit manufacturer	Main sponsor
Ansan Greeners	(South Korea) Kim Gil-sik	Lupo Finta	Ansan Government
Bucheon FC 1995	(South Korea) Song Sun-ho	Astore	Bucheon Government
Chungnam Asan	(South Korea) Park Dong-hyuk	Mizuno	Asan Government
Daejeon Hana Citizen	(South Korea) Hwang Sun-hong	Astore	Hana Financial Group
FC Anyang	(South Korea) Kim Hyung-yul	Joma	Anyang Government
Gyeongnam FC	(South Korea) Seol Ki-hyeon	Hummel	Gyeongnam Provincial Government
Jeju United	(South Korea) Nam Ki-il	Puma	SK Energy
Jeonnam Dragons	(South Korea) Jeon Kyung-jun	Puma	POSCO
Seoul E-Land	(South Korea) Chung Jung-yong	New Balance	E-Land
Suwon FC	(South Korea) Kim Do-kyun	Hummel	Suwon Government

Note: Flags indicate national team as has been defined under FIFA eligibility rules. Players may hold more than one non-FIFA nationality.

=== Managerial changes ===
Team	Outgoing	Manner	Date	Incoming	Date	Table
Suwon FC	(South Korea) Lee Kwan-woo (caretaker)	Caretaker	10 November 2019	(South Korea) Kim Do-kyun	15 November 2019	Pre-season
Seoul E-Land	(South Korea) Woo Sung-yong (caretaker)	Caretaker	10 November 2019	(South Korea) Chung Jung-yong	5 December 2019	Pre-season
Jeju United	(South Korea) Choi Yun-kyum	Resigned	30 November 2019	(South Korea) Nam Ki-il	26 December 2019	Pre-season
Daejeon Hana Citizen	(South Korea) Lee Heung-sil	Sacked	2 December 2019	(South Korea) Hwang Sun-hong	4 January 2020	Pre-season
Ansan Greeners	(South Korea) Lim Wan-sup	Resigned	23 December 2019	(South Korea) Kim Gil-sik	31 December 2019	Pre-season
Gyeongnam FC	(South Korea) Kim Jong-boo	End of contract	26 December 2019	(South Korea) Seol Ki-hyeon	26 December 2019	Pre-season

=== Foreign players ===
Restricting the number of foreign players strictly to five per team, including a slot for a player from AFC and ASEAN countries. A team could use four foreign players on the field each game.

North Korean player An Byong-jun was deemed as a native player in K League by South Korean nationality law and passport.

Players in bold are players who join midway through the competition.

As of 2 August 2020

Team	Player 1	Player 2	Player 3	AFC player	ASEAN player	Former player(s)
Ansan Greeners	(Brazil) **Anderson Canhoto**	(Brazil) Felipe Augusto		(Lebanon) Soony Saad		(Spain) Ismael Jorge Balea (Brazil) Bruno Moreira
Bucheon FC 1995	(Brazil) William Barbio					(Brazil) Jefferson Baiano
Chungnam Asan	(Austria) Armin Mujakic	(Brazil) **Bruno Moreira**	(Sweden) Philip Hellquist			
Daejeon Hana Citizen	(Brazil) André Luis	(Brazil) Bruno Baio	(Brazil) **Edinho**	(Australia) Connor Chapman		
FC Anyang	(Brazil) Maurides	(Brazil) Nilson Júnior	(Ghana) Maxwell Acosty			(Uzbekistan) Khursid Giyosov
Gyeongnam FC	(Brazil) Negueba	(Serbia) Uroš Đerić				(Netherlands) Luc Castaignos (Australia) Nick Ansell
Jeju United	(Cyprus) Valentinos Sielis					(Brazil) Eder (Costa Rica) Elías Aguilar
Jeonnam Dragons	(Brazil) **Hernandes**	(Brazil) Rodolfo	(Norway) Julian Kristoffersen	(Uzbekistan) **Oleg Zoteev**		
Seoul E-Land	(Brazil) Leandro Ribeiro	(Germany) Richard Sukuta-Pasu	(Serbia) Lazar Arsić			
Suwon FC	(Brazil) Danilo Alves	(Brazil) Marlone	(South Africa) **Lars Veldwijk**	(Japan) Masatoshi Ishida		(Slovakia) Ákos Szarka

== League table ==
Pos	Team	Pld	W	D	L	GF	GA	GD	Pts	Promotion or qualification
1	Jeju United (C, P)	27	18	6	3	50	23	+27	60	Promotion to K League 1
2	Suwon FC (O, P)	27	17	3	7	52	28	+24	54	Qualification for promotion play-offs final
3	Gyeongnam FC	27	10	9	8	40	37	+3	39	Qualification for promotion play-offs first round
4	Daejeon Hana Citizen	27	11	6	10	36	35	+1	39	Qualification for promotion play-offs first round
5	Seoul E-Land	27	11	6	10	33	30	+3	39	
6	Jeonnam Dragons	27	8	14	5	31	25	+6	38	
7	Ansan Greeners	27	7	7	13	18	34	−16	28	
8	Bucheon FC 1995	27	7	5	15	19	36	−17	26	
9	FC Anyang	27	6	7	14	27	38	−11	25	
10	Chungnam Asan	27	5	7	15	20	40	−20	22	

Source: K League Soccerway
Rules for classification: 1) Points; 2) Goals scored; 3) Goal difference; 4) Wins; 5) Head-to-head points
(C) Champions; (O) Play-off winners; (P) Promoted

== Positions by matchday ==
Leaders, promotion to K League 1
Qualification for promotion play-offs final
Qualification for promotion play-offs first round

=== Round 1–18 ===
Team ╲ Round	1	2	3	4	5	6	7	8	9	10	11	12	13	14	15	16	17	18
Jeju United	4	9	8	6	4	3	2	3	2	3	2	3	3	3	3	1	1	1
Suwon FC	8	4	3	2	3	5	4	1	1	1	1	1	1	1	1	2	2	2
Daejeon Hana Citizen	1	2	2	1	2	2	1	2	4	2	3	2	2	2	2	3	3	3
Gyeongnam FC	6	7	4	5	6	6	5	6	7	7	7	7	7	6	4	4	4	4
Seoul E-Land	4	6	6	8	7	7	7	5	6	5	6	6	5	4	5	6	5	5
Jeonnam Dragons	6	3	5	4	5	4	6	7	5	6	4	4	4	7	6	5	6	6
FC Anyang	9	10	10	7	8	8	9	9	10	9	8	9	10	8	8	8	8	7
Bucheon FC 1995	2	1	1	3	1	1	3	4	3	4	5	5	6	5	7	7	7	8
Chungnam Asan	9	8	9	10	10	9	10	10	8	8	9	8	9	10	10	10	9	9
Ansan Greeners	2	5	7	9	9	10	8	8	9	10	10	10	8	9	9	9	10	10

Source: K League

=== Round 19–27 ===
Team ╲ Round	19	20	21	22	23	24	25	26	27
Jeju United	1	1	1	1	2	1	1	1	1
Suwon FC	2	2	2	2	1	2	2	2	2
Gyeongnam FC	4	6	4	5	4	5	4	6	3
Daejeon Hana Citizen	3	3	3	3	5	6	5	3	4
Seoul E-Land	6	5	6	4	3	4	3	4	5
Jeonnam Dragons	5	4	5	6	6	3	6	5	6
Ansan Greeners	10	9	9	10	10	8	9	9	7
Bucheon FC 1995	8	8	8	7	7	7	8	7	8
FC Anyang	7	7	7	8	8	9	7	8	9
Chungnam Asan	9	10	10	9	9	10	10	10	10

Source: K League

== Results ==
=== Matches 1–18 ===
Home \ Away	ASG	AYG	BCN	CNAS	DJC	GNM	JJU	JND	SUE	SWN
Ansan Greeners	—	0–1	0–2	1–1	0–2	0–0	1–2	0–0	0–1	0–2
FC Anyang	0–1	—	2–1	1–1	0–0	2–3	1–2	0–0	2–1	0–2
Bucheon FC 1995	0–0	2–1	—	0–2	1–0	0–1	0–1	0–1	2–3	2–0
Chungnam Asan	1–1	0–2	0–1	—	1–2	2–1	0–2	0–2	0–1	0–5
Daejeon Hana Citizen	1–0	3–3	1–0	2–2	—	2–3	2–1	2–0	0–0	1–4
Gyeongnam FC	2–1	1–0	1–1	2–0	2–2	—	3–3	0–0	1–2	2–3
Jeju United	3–1	3–1	4–0	2–1	2–3	1–1	—	1–1	1–1	1–0
Jeonnam Dragons	4–0	1–1	2–0	1–1	1–1	1–1	1–0	—	1–2	1–2
Seoul E-Land	0–2	0–2	3–0	1–2	2–0	2–2	1–2	0–0	—	0–3
Suwon FC	1–2	3–2	1–2	1–1	1–2	3–1	1–1	2–2	2–0	—

Source: K League
Legend: Blue = home team win; Yellow = draw; Red = away team win.

=== Matches 19–27 ===
Home \ Away	ASG	AYG	BCN	CNAS	DJC	GNM	JJU	JND	SUE	SWN
Ansan Greeners	—	1–0	2–0	—	1–2	—	—	—	0–3	0–4
FC Anyang	—	—	0–0	—	—	—	—	1–2	1–1	1–2
Bucheon FC 1995	—	—	—	0–0	—	3–4	0–2	1–1	—	—
Chungnam Asan	0–1	0–2	—	—	3–2	—	0–1	—	—	0–2
Daejeon Hana Citizen	—	3–0	0–1	—	—	—	—	—	1–2	0–1
Gyeongnam FC	1–2	1–0	—	3–1	1–0	—	0–1	—	—	—
Jeju United	1–1	4–1	—	—	2–0	—	—	—	3–2	2–0
Jeonnam Dragons	0–0	—	—	1–0	1–2	2–2	0–2	—	—	—
Seoul E-Land	—	—	3–0	0–1	—	1–0	—	1–1	—	—
Suwon FC	—	—	1–0	—	—	2–1	—	3–4	1–0	—

Source: K League
Legend: Blue = home team win; Yellow = draw; Red = away team win.

== Promotion play-offs ==
The first round was contested between the third and fourth-placed teams, and the runners-up played the winners of the first round in the final. When the matches were finished as draws, their winners were decided on the regular season rankings without extra time and penalty shoot-outs.

=== Bracket ===
First round			Final
			2	Suwon FC	1
3	Gyeongnam FC	1	3	Gyeongnam FC	1
4	Daejeon Hana Citizen	1

=== First round ===
25 November 2020
19:00 KST

Gyeongnam FC	1–1	Daejeon Hana Citizen
Ko Kyung-min 69'		Edinho 61'

Changwon Football Center, Changwon
Attendance: 0

=== Final ===
29 November 2020
15:00 KST

Suwon FC	1–1	Gyeongnam FC
An Byong-jun 90+8' (pen.)		Choi Jun 27'

Suwon Sports Complex, Suwon
Attendance: 1,000

Suwon FC was promoted to K League 1.

== Statistics ==
=== Top goalscorers ===
Rank	Player	Club	Goals
1	(North Korea) An Byong-jun	Suwon FC	21
2	(Brazil) André Luis	Daejeon Hana Citizen	13
3	(Brazil) Leandro Ribeiro	Seoul E-Land	10
3	(Japan) Masatoshi Ishida	Suwon FC	10
5	(South Korea) Gong Min-hyun	Jeju United	9
5	(South Korea) Baek Sung-dong	Gyeongnam FC	9
7	(South Korea) Joo Min-kyu	Jeju United	8
8	(Ghana) Boadu Maxwell Acosty	FC Anyang	7
8	(Germany) Richard Sukuta-Pasu	Seoul E-Land	7
8	(South Korea) Ko Kyung-min	Gyeongnam FC	7

=== Top assist providers ===
Rank	Player	Club	Assists
1	(South Korea) Kim Young-uk	Jeju United	7
2	(South Korea) Hwang Il-su	Gyeongnam FC	5
2	(Brazil) Leandro Ribeiro	Seoul E-Land	5
4	(South Korea) Lim Chang-gyoon	Jeonnam Dragons	4
4	(Brazil) Marlone	Suwon FC	4
4	(South Korea) Park Gi-dong	Gyeongnam FC	4
4	(South Korea) Kang Yoon-sung	Jeju United	4
4	(South Korea) Jeong Woo-jae	Jeju United	4
4	(North Korea) An Byong-jun	Suwon FC	4
4	(Japan) Masatoshi Ishida	Suwon FC	4

== Awards ==
=== Weekly awards ===
Round	Player of the Round	
Round	Player	Club
1	(South Korea) Park Yong-ji	Daejeon Hana Citizen
2	(Brazil) André Luis	Daejeon Hana Citizen
3	(North Korea) An Byong-jun	Suwon FC
4	(Japan) Masatoshi Ishida	Suwon FC
5	(South Korea) Lee Hyun-il	Bucheon FC 1995
6	(Germany) Richard Sukuta-Pasu	Seoul E-Land
7	(South Korea) Kim Ryun-do	Ansan Greeners
8	(Brazil) Leandro Ribeiro	Seoul E-Land
9	(Japan) Masatoshi Ishida	Suwon FC
10	(Germany) Richard Sukuta-Pasu	Seoul E-Land
11	(Japan) Masatoshi Ishida	Suwon FC
12	(North Korea) An Byong-jun	Suwon FC
13	(Brazil) Leandro Ribeiro	Seoul E-Land
14	(South Korea) Hwang Il-su	Gyeongnam FC

Round	Player of the Round	
Round	Player	Club
15	(South Korea) Baek Sung-dong	Gyeongnam FC
16	(South Korea) Jeong Woo-jae	Jeju United
17	(South Korea) Lee Dong-ryul	Jeju United
18	(South Korea) Hwang Ki-wook	Jeonnam Dragons
19	(South Korea) Ahn Hyeon-beom	Jeju United
20	(South Africa) Lars Veldwijk	Suwon FC
21	(South Korea) Ko Kyung-min	Gyeongnam FC
22	(South Korea) Jin Seong-uk	Jeju United
23	(South Korea) Kim Jin-hwan	Seoul E-Land
24	(South Korea) Park Chan-yong	Jeonnam Dragons
25	(Brazil) Edinho	Daejeon Hana Citizen
26	(South Korea) Jin Seong-uk	Jeju United
27	(South Korea) Kim Ryun-do	Ansan Greeners

=== Monthly awards ===
Month	Manager of the Month		
Month	Manager	Club	Division
May	(South Korea) Kim Nam-il	Seongnam FC	1
June	(Portugal) José Morais	Jeonbuk Hyundai Motors	1
July	(South Korea) Kim Do-hoon	Ulsan Hyundai	1
August	(South Korea) Nam Ki-il	Jeju United	2
September	(South Korea) Kim Gi-dong	Pohang Steelers	1
October	(South Korea) Nam Ki-il	Jeju United	2

=== Annual awards ===
The 2020 K League Awards was held on 30 November 2020.

Award	Winner	Club
Most Valuable Player	(North Korea) An Byong-jun	Suwon FC
Young Player of the Year	(South Korea) Lee Dong-ryul	Jeju United
Top goalscorer	(North Korea) An Byong-jun	Suwon FC
Top assist provider	(South Korea) Kim Young-uk	Jeju United
Manager of the Year	(South Korea) Nam Ki-il	Jeju United

Position	Best XI			
Goalkeeper	(South Korea) Oh Seung-hoon (Jeju)			
Defenders	(South Korea) Ahn Hyeon-beom (Jeju)	(South Korea) Cho Yu-min (Suwon FC)	(South Korea) Chung Woon (Jeju)	(South Korea) Jeong Woo-jae (Jeju)
Midfielders	(South Korea) Baek Sung-dong (Gyeongnam)	(South Korea) Kim Young-uk (Jeju)	(South Korea) Lee Chang-min (Jeju)	(South Korea) Gong Min-hyun (Jeju)
Forwards	(Brazil) Leandro Ribeiro (Seoul E)		(North Korea) An Byong-jun (Suwon FC)	

== See also ==
- 2020 in South Korean football
- 2020 Korean FA Cup
