= 2019 K League =

2019 K League may refer to:

- 2019 K League 1 (1st Division)
- 2019 K League 2 (2nd Division)
