= Fauver =

Brazilian footballer (born 1994)

Personal information
- Full name: Fauver Frank Mendes Braga
- Date of birth: 14 September 1994 (age 32)
- Place of birth: São Paulo, Brazil
- Height: 1.72 m (5 ft 8 in)
- Position: Midfielder

Youth career
- 2012: Monte Azul
- 2013: Bahia

Senior career*
Years	Team	Apps	(Gls)
2014–2015	Rio Branco	0	(0)
2015	Gyeongnam	6	(0)
2016	PSTC	17	(0)
2017	Toledo	3	(0)
2017–2018	Rio Branco	18	(2)
2018	Tocantinópolis	0	(0)
2019	Ansan Greeners	21	(1)
2020	Ferroviário	7	(0)
2020	CEOV Operário	1	(0)
2021	Velo Clube	6	(0)
2021	Afogados	9	(4)
2021	Santa Cruz	7	(0)
- * Club domestic league appearances and goals as of 14:39, 2 January 2022 (UTC)

Fauver Frank Mendes Braga (born 14 September 1994), commonly known as Fauver, is a Brazilian footballer who plays as a midfielder.

== Career statistics ==
As of 29 March 2019

Club	Season	League			Cup		Other		Total	
Club	Season	Division	Apps	Goals	Apps	Goals	Apps	Goals	Apps	Goals
Rio Branco	2014	Série D	0	0	2 (Note: Appearances in the Copa Paulista)	0	0	0	2	0
Gyeongnam	2015	K League Challenge	6	0	0	0	0	0	6	0
PSTC	2016	Série D	3	0	0	0	14 (Note: Appearances in the Campeonato Paranaense)	0	17	0
Toledo	2017	–			0	0	3	1	3	1
Rio Branco	2017	Série D	0	0	10	4	0	0	10	4
Rio Branco	2018	Série D	0	0	0	0	18 (Note: Appearances in the Campeonato Paulista A3)	2	18	2
Ansan Greeners	2019	K League 2	21	1	0	0	0	0	3	0
Career total			12	0	12	4	35	3	59	7
