= Jeong Hyun-woo =

South Korean footballer (born 2000)

Personal information
- Date of birth: 12 July 2000 (age 26)
- Place of birth: Yeosu, South Korea
- Height: 1.77 m (5 ft 10 in)
- Position: Winger

Team information
- Current team: Ansan Greeners
- Number: 8

Youth career
- 2016–2018: Kumho High School

Senior career*
Years	Team	Apps	(Gls)
2016–2018	Gwangju FC	9	(0)
2022	Chuncheon FC		
2023	Siheung Citizen FC		
2024–2025	Pyeongtaek Citizen FC		
2026–	Ansan Greeners		
- * Club domestic league appearances and goals as of 6 August 2026

- Jeong Hyun-woo
- Hangul: 정현우
- RR: Jeong Hyeonu
- MR: Chŏng Hyŏnu

Jeong Hyun-woo (born 12 July 2000) is a South Korean footballer currently playing as a Winger for K League 2 club Ansan Greeners.

== Career statistics ==
=== Club ===
As of 11 June 2021.

Club	Season	League			Cup		Other		Total	
Club	Season	Division	Apps	Goals	Apps	Goals	Apps	Goals	Apps	Goals
Gwangju FC	2019	K League 2	3	0	1 (Note: Appearances in the Korean FA Cup)	0	0	0	4	0
Gwangju FC	2020	K League 1	1	0	1	0	0	0	2	0
Gwangju FC	2021	K League 1	5	0	0	0	0	0	5	0
Career total			9	0	2	0	0	0	11	0
