= 2019 K League 2 =

Seventh season of the K League 2, the second tier South Korean professional league

Hana 1Q K League 2
- Season: 2019
- Champions: Gwangju FC (1st title)
- Promoted: Gwangju FC; Busan IPark
- Matches: 180
- Best player: Lee Dong-jun
- Top goalscorer: Felipe (19 goals)

The 2019 K League 2 was the seventh season of the K League 2, the second-highest division in the South Korean football league system. Its champions could be promoted to the K League 1 the next season, and second, third and fourth-placed team advanced to the promotion playoffs.

== Teams ==
=== Team changes ===
Relegated from K League 1

- Jeonnam Dragons

Promoted to K League 1

- Seongnam FC

=== Stadiums ===
Ansan Greeners	Asan Mugunghwa	Bucheon FC 1995	Busan IPark	Daejeon Citizen
Ansan Wa~ Stadium	Yi Sun-sin Stadium	Bucheon Stadium	Busan Gudeok Stadium	Daejeon World Cup Stadium
Capacity: **35,000**	Capacity: **17,376**	Capacity: **34,456**	Capacity: **12,349**	Capacity: **40,535**
FC Anyang	Gwangju FC	Jeonnam Dragons	Seoul E-Land	Suwon FC
Anyang Stadium	Gwangju World Cup Stadium	Gwangyang Stadium	Seoul Olympic Stadium	Suwon Sports Complex
Capacity: **17,143**	Capacity: **40,245**	Capacity: **13,496**	Capacity: **69,950**	Capacity: **11,808**

=== Personnel and sponsoring ===
Note: Flags indicate national team as has been defined under FIFA eligibility rules. Players may hold more than one non-FIFA nationality.

Team	Manager	Kit manufacturer	Main sponsor
Ansan Greeners	(South Korea) Lim Wan-sup	Lupo Finta	Ansan Government
Asan Mugunghwa	(South Korea) Park Dong-hyuk	Mizuno	Asan Government and Korean Police Agency
Bucheon FC 1995	(South Korea) Song Sun-ho	Astore	Bucheon Government
Busan IPark	(South Korea) Cho Deok-je	Adidas	Hyundai Development Company
Daejeon Citizen	(South Korea) Lee Heung-sil	Joma	Daejeon Government
FC Anyang	(South Korea) Kim Hyung-yul	Joma	Anyang Government
Gwangju FC	(South Korea) Park Jin-sub	Kelme	Gwangju Government
Jeonnam Dragons	(South Korea) Jeon Kyung-jun	Joma	POSCO
Seoul E-Land	(South Korea) Woo Sung-yong	New Balance	E-Land
Suwon FC	(South Korea) Kim Dae-eui	Hummel	Suwon Government

=== Managerial changes ===
Team	Outgoing	Manner	Date	Incoming	Date	Table
Daejeon Citizen	(South Korea) Ko Jong-soo	Sacked	21 May 2019	(South Korea) Park Chul (caretaker)	21 May 2019	
Seoul E-Land	(South Korea) Kim Hyun-soo	Sacked	22 May 2019	(South Korea) Woo Sung-yong (caretaker)	17 June 2019	
Daejeon Citizen	(South Korea) Park Chul	Caretaker	1 July 2019	(South Korea) Lee Heung-sil	1 July 2019	
Jeonnam Dragons	(Brazil) Fabiano Soares	Resigned	27 July 2019	(South Korea) Jeon Kyung-jun (caretaker)	27 July 2019	
Suwon FC	(South Korea) Kim Dae-eui	Resigned	29 October 2019	(South Korea) Lee Kwan-woo (caretaker)	29 October 2019	

=== Foreign players ===
Restricting the number of foreign players strictly to four per team, including a slot for a player from AFC countries. A team could use four foreign players on the field each game. Players in bold are players who joined midway through the competition.

Club	Player 1	Player 2	Player 3	Player 4	Asian player	Former player(s)
Ansan Greeners	(Brazil) Fauver	(Brazil) Gustavo Vintecinco			(Japan) Masatoshi Ishida	
Bucheon FC 1995	(Brazil) Nilson Júnior	(Ecuador) Marlon de Jesús			(Brazil) Rodrigo Maranhão	(China) Nan Song
Busan IPark	(Brazil) Diego Maurício	(Brazil) Rômulo	(Hungary) Soma Novothny	(Serbia) Aleksandar Šušnjar		
Daejeon Citizen	(Brazil) **Matheus Pato**	(Brazil) **Rafael Ramazotti**	(Romania) Aurelian Chițu			(Uzbekistan) Shohrux Gadoyev (Uzbekistan) Sanzhar Tursunov
FC Anyang	(Brazil) Alex Lima	(Colombia) Manuel Palacios	(Ukraine) Mykola Kovtalyuk			(Australia) Dylan Fox
Gwangju FC	(Brazil) Felipe	(Brazil) **Ratinho**	(Brazil) Willyan		(Uzbekistan) Rustam Ashurmatov	
Jeonnam Dragons	(Brazil) **Bruno Baio**	(Brazil) Bruno Nunes	(Brazil) Wanderson Macedo		(Australia) Nick Ansell	(Croatia) Vedran Jugović
Seoul E-Land	(Brazil) Wesley Alex	(Brazil) Douglas Coutinho	(Brazil) Róbson Duarte		(Japan) Chikashi Masuda	
Suwon FC	(Estonia) Henri Anier	(Nigeria) Chisom Egbuchulam	(North Korea) An Byong-jun (Note: An Byong-jun represented North Korea at international level, but he was deemed as a native player in the K League 2 by South Korean law and passport.)		(Uzbekistan) Jovlon Ibrokhimov	(Colombia) Sebastián Velásquez

== League table ==
Pos	Team	Pld	W	D	L	GF	GA	GD	Pts	Promotion or qualification
1	Gwangju FC (C, P)	36	21	10	5	59	31	+28	73	Promotion to K League 1
2	Busan IPark (O, P)	36	18	13	5	72	47	+25	67	Qualification for promotion playoffs semi-final
3	FC Anyang	36	15	10	11	63	50	+13	55	Qualification for promotion playoffs first round
4	Bucheon FC 1995	36	14	9	13	49	51	−2	51	Qualification for promotion playoffs first round
5	Ansan Greeners	36	14	8	14	46	42	+4	50	
6	Jeonnam Dragons	36	13	9	14	43	47	−4	48	
7	Asan Mugunghwa	36	12	8	16	42	56	−14	44	
8	Suwon FC	36	11	10	15	49	55	−6	43	
9	Daejeon Citizen	36	8	11	17	31	47	−16	35	
10	Seoul E-Land	36	5	10	21	43	71	−28	25	

Source: K League Soccerway
Rules for classification: 1) Points; 2) Goals scored; 3) Goal difference; 4) Wins; 5) Head-to-head points
(C) Champions; (O) Play-off winners; (P) Promoted

== Positions by matchday ==
Leaders
Qualification for the promotion playoffs

=== Round 1–18 ===
Team ╲ Round	1	2	3	4	5	6	7	8	9	10	11	12	13	14	15	16	17	18
Gwangju FC	3	1	1	1	1	1	1	1	1	1	1	1	2	1	1	1	1	1
Busan IPark	7	6	5	6	3	2	2	2	2	2	2	2	1	2	2	2	2	2
FC Anyang	1	4	6	7	7	9	5	3	3	3	4	5	4	5	6	5	5	3
Asan Mugunghwa	2	5	4	2	2	3	4	7	4	5	5	4	5	4	4	4	4	4
Suwon FC	8	9	7	5	5	5	7	5	6	4	3	3	3	3	3	3	3	5
Ansan Greeners	6	7	10	9	8	6	8	8	5	6	6	6	7	7	5	6	6	6
Bucheon FC 1995	5	3	3	3	4	4	6	4	7	7	7	7	6	6	7	7	7	7
Jeonnam Dragons	10	10	8	8	9	10	10	9	9	9	9	8	8	9	8	8	8	8
Daejeon Citizen	4	2	2	4	6	7	3	6	8	8	8	9	9	8	9	9	9	9
Seoul E-Land	9	8	9	10	10	8	9	10	10	10	10	10	10	10	10	10	10	10

Source: K League

=== Round 19–36 ===
Team ╲ Round	19	20	21	22	23	24	25	26	27	28	29	30	31	32	33	34	35	36
Gwangju FC	1	1	1	1	1	1	1	1	1	1	1	1	1	1	1	1	1	1
Busan IPark	2	2	2	2	2	2	2	2	2	2	2	2	2	2	2	2	2	2
FC Anyang	3	3	3	3	3	3	3	4	3	3	3	3	3	3	4	3	3	3
Bucheon FC 1995	7	7	7	7	7	7	7	7	7	7	7	7	8	8	6	5	5	4
Ansan Greeners	6	6	5	5	5	5	4	3	4	4	4	4	5	4	3	4	4	5
Jeonnam Dragons	8	8	8	8	8	8	8	8	8	8	8	8	7	6	7	7	6	6
Asan Mugunghwa	4	4	4	4	4	4	5	5	5	5	5	5	4	5	5	6	7	7
Suwon FC	5	5	6	6	6	6	6	6	6	6	6	6	6	7	8	8	8	8
Daejeon Citizen	9	9	9	9	10	10	10	10	10	10	9	9	9	9	9	9	9	9
Seoul E-Land	10	10	10	10	9	9	9	9	9	9	10	10	10	10	10	10	10	10

Source: K League

== Results ==
=== Matches 1–18 ===
Home \ Away	ANS	ANY	ASM	BUC	BIP	DJC	GWJ	JND	SEL	SUW
Ansan Greeners	—	1–1	1–0	0–1	0–0	1–2	0–0	3–0	1–0	2–3
FC Anyang	0–0	—	0–1	2–2	1–3	2–1	0–1	2–1	2–1	2–0
Asan Mugunghwa	1–1	0–2	—	3–2	2–5	1–0	0–0	1–1	3–1	1–2
Bucheon FC 1995	1–2	1–0	0–0	—	1–3	1–1	0–1	1–1	3–2	1–0
Busan IPark	3–0	1–4	2–4	3–3	—	2–1	1–1	1–0	4–1	2–2
Daejeon Citizen	1–3	0–2	0–1	1–0	0–5	—	0–1	1–2	0–0	0–2
Gwangju FC	3–1	2–2	4–0	4–1	1–1	0–0	—	2–0	3–1	2–1
Jeonnam Dragons	1–3	1–0	0–3	1–0	1–0	1–3	1–2	—	1–1	1–2
Seoul E-Land	1–1	4–1	0–2	1–2	3–3	1–1	0–2	0–1	—	1–1
Suwon FC	2–1	1–2	2–0	0–3	1–2	2–0	0–2	1–1	3–1	—

Source: K League
Legend: Blue = home team win; Yellow = draw; Red = away team win.

=== Matches 19–36 ===
Home \ Away	ANS	ANY	ASM	BUC	BIP	DJC	GWJ	JND	SEL	SUW
Ansan Greeners	—	1–3	1–2	1–2	2–0	0–2	2–1	1–0	2–0	1–2
FC Anyang	3–2	—	4–1	1–2	2–2	0–0	7–1	4–2	5–2	0–2
Asan Mugunghwa	1–1	1–4	—	2–3	0–1	0–1	0–1	1–0	3–2	1–1
Bucheon FC 1995	1–2	2–2	3–0	—	0–2	1–3	1–1	0–3	3–2	1–1
Busan IPark	0–2	1–1	3–2	2–2	—	2–0	3–2	0–0	3–1	2–0
Daejeon Citizen	0–0	1–1	0–1	1–2	0–0	—	3–1	1–2	1–0	2–4
Gwangju FC	2–1	4–0	3–1	1–0	1–1	0–0	—	1–2	3–1	2–0
Jeonnam Dragons	2–1	2–0	2–0	0–1	3–3	2–0	1–1	—	0–1	3–2
Seoul E-Land	1–3	2–0	1–1	1–0	3–5	2–2	0–2	2–2	—	2–1
Suwon FC	2–3	1–1	2–2	1–2	0–1	2–2	0–3	2–2	1–1	—

Source: K League
Legend: Blue = home team win; Yellow = draw; Red = away team win.

== Promotion playoffs ==
When the first round or semi-final match was finished as a draw, its winners were decided on the regular season rankings without extra time and the penalty shoot-out.

=== Bracket ===
First round
3	FC Anyang	1
4	Bucheon FC 1995	1

Semi-final
2	Busan IPark	1
3	FC Anyang	0

Final
Busan IPark	0	2	2
Gyeongnam FC	0	0	0

=== First round ===
23 November 2019
15:00 KST

FC Anyang	1–1	Bucheon FC 1995
Palacios 11'	Report	An Tae-hyun 78'

Anyang Stadium, Anyang
Attendance: 6,017
Referee: Park Byung-jin

=== Semi-final ===
30 November 2019
14:00 KST

Busan IPark	1–0	FC Anyang
Rômulo 61'	Report

Busan Gudeok Stadium, Busan
Attendance: 8,570
Referee: Kim Yong-woo

=== Final ===
The promotion-relegation playoffs were held between the winners of the 2019 K League 2 playoffs and the 11th-placed club of the 2019 K League 1.

5 December 2019
19:00 KST

Busan IPark	0–0	Gyeongnam FC
	Report

Busan Gudeok Stadium, Busan
Attendance: 8,249
Referee: Kim Dae-yong

8 December 2019
14:00 KST

Gyeongnam FC	0–2	Busan IPark
	Report	Rômulo 78' (pen.); Novothny 90+5'

Changwon Football Center
Attendance: 5,397
Referee: Go Hyung-jin

Busan IPark won 2–0 on aggregate and were promoted to the K League 1, while Gyeongnam FC were relegated to the K League 2.

== Player statistics ==
=== Top scorers ===
Rank	Player	Club	Goals
1	(Brazil) Felipe	Gwangju FC	19
2	(Nigeria) Chisom Egbuchulam	Suwon FC	18
3	(South Korea) Cho Gue-sung	FC Anyang	14
4	(South Korea) Lee Dong-jun	Busan IPark	13
4	(Brazil) Rômulo	Busan IPark	13
4	(South Korea) Lee Jeong-hyeop	Busan IPark	13
4	(Brazil) Alex Lima	FC Anyang	13
8	(South Korea) Ko Moo-yeol	Asan Mugunghwa	12
8	(Hungary) Soma Novothny	Busan IPark	12

=== Top assist providers ===
Rank	Player	Club	Assists
1	(South Korea) Jeong Jae-hee	Jeonnam Dragons	10
2	(South Korea) Chang Hyuk-jin	Ansan Greeners	9
3	(South Korea) Kim Sang-won	FC Anyang	8
4	(South Korea) Park Jong-woo	Busan IPark	7
4	(South Korea) Baek Sung-dong	Suwon FC	7
4	(South Korea) Lee Dong-jun	Busan IPark	7
7	(South Korea) Kim Min-kyun	Seoul E-Land	6
7	(Colombia) Manuel Palacios	FC Anyang	6
9	(South Korea) Ju Se-jong	Asan Mugunghwa	5
9	(South Korea) Róbson	Seoul E-Land	5
9	(Brazil) Alex Lima	FC Anyang	5
9	(South Korea) Kim Ryun-do	Bucheon FC 1995	5

== Attendance ==
Attendants who entered with free ticket were not counted.

Pos	Team	Total	High	Low	Average	Change
1	Busan IPark	71,000	7,724	1,386	3,944	+59.3%
2	FC Anyang	65,597	11,098	835	3,644	+142.1%
3	Asan Mugunghwa	56,494	6,040	1,361	3,139	+78.9%
4	Gwangju FC	56,669	5,408	903	3,148	+106.8%
5	Seoul E-Land	56,114	4,752	1,316	3,117	+352.4%
6	Ansan Greeners	53,438	7,714	619	2,969	+63.1%
7	Suwon FC	45,674	4,383	1,477	2,537	+35.2%
8	Bucheon FC 1995	39,946	3,987	771	2,219	+116.3%
9	Jeonnam Dragons	41,709	4,882	48	2,317	−30.2%^{†}
10	Daejeon Citizen	35,589	4,370	655	1,977	+20.2%
	League total	522,130	11,098	48	2,901	+73.5%

Source: K League
Notes:
^{†} Team played previous season in K League 1.

== See also ==
- 2019 in South Korean football
- 2019 K League 1
- 2019 Korean FA Cup
