= Nan Song (footballer) =

Chinese footballer

Nan Song 南松
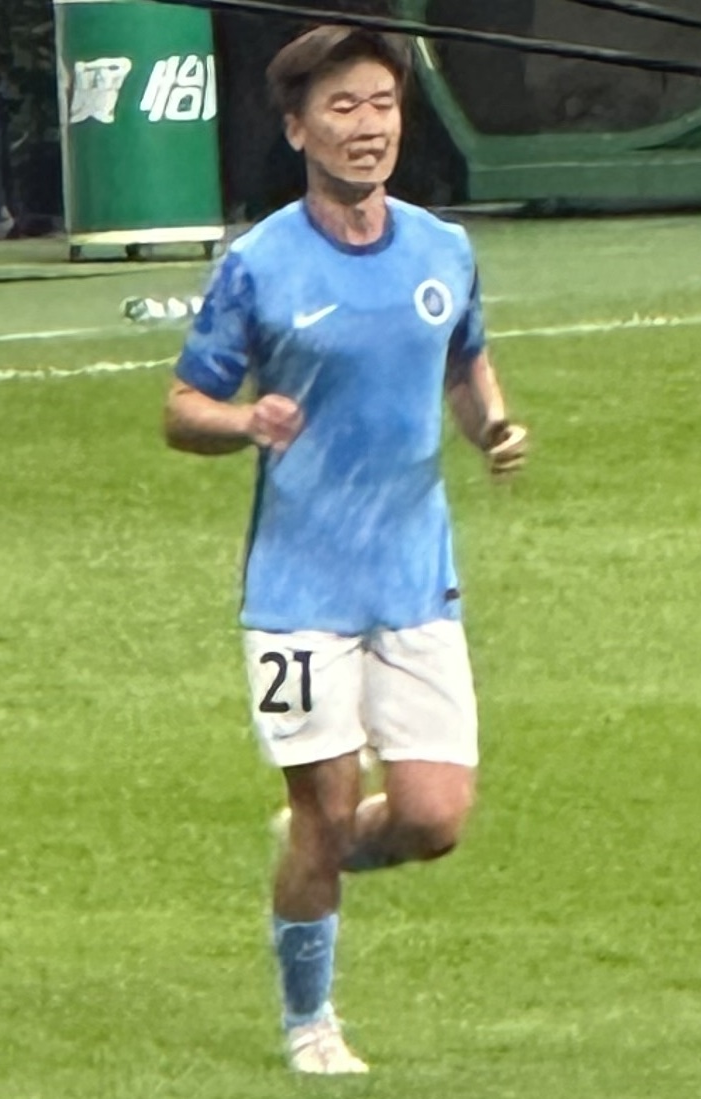
- Nan Song in May 2025

Personal information
- Date of birth: 21 June 1997 (age 29)
- Place of birth: Yanji, Jilin, China
- Height: 1.70 m (5 ft 7 in)
- Position: Midfielder

Team information
- Current team: Qingdao West Coast
- Number: 35

Youth career
- 2010–2015: Yanbian FC
- 2016: Albirex Niigata

Senior career*
Years	Team	Apps	(Gls)
2016–2020	Bucheon FC 1995	3	(0)
2017	→ Chongqing Lifan (loan)	27	(3)
2021	Sichuan Jiuniu	30	(2)
2022	Chongqing Liangjiang Athletic	0	(0)
2022–2026	Shenzhen Peng City	85	(1)
2026–	Qingdao West Coast	8	(0)

International career^{‡}
2017–2020	China U23	7	(0)
- * Club domestic league appearances and goals as of 19 November 2026 ‡ National team caps and goals as of 10 June 2018

Nan Song (Chinese: 南松; Korean: 남송; born 21 June 1997) is a Chinese footballer of Korean ethnicity who plays for Chinese Super League club Qingdao West Coast.

== Club career ==
Nan Song joined Yanbian FC's youth academy in 2010. He refused to sign a professional contract with Yanbian and training with Japanese side Albirex Niigata in 2016. He signed his first professional contract with K League Challenge side Bucheon FC 1995 on 26 July 2016.

Nan returned to China and had trial with Chinese Super League side Chongqing Dangdai Lifan in January 2017. However, his former club Yanbian claimed that Nan was belong to the club and his trial at Chongqing was illegal. Yanbian officially announced they ratified Nan's loan deal to Chongqing temporary for one season on 28 February 2017. Chongqing Lifan then confirmed Nan joined the club with a one-year loan deal. On 5 March 2017, Nan made his senior debut in a 0–0 home draw against Yanbian Funde. He scored his first senior goal on 14 April 2017 in a 2–1 home victory against Guizhou Hengfeng Zhicheng. Nan scored his second goal on 8 July 2017 in a 4–0 over Yanbian Funde and his third goal came on 29 July in a 2–1 home loss against Jiangsu Suning. At the end of the 2017 season, Nan went on to make 27 appearances and scoring three goals in all competitions.

Nan was linked with another Super League club Guizhou Hengfeng after the 2017 season. On 19 December 2017, Yanbian submitted a claim to FIFA Dispute Resolution Chamber (DRC) for the ownership of Nan Song. He failed to joined other Chinese clubs and stayed at Bucheon FC 1995 for the 2018 K League 2 season. On 8 February 2018, Bucheon FC 1995 made an official statement that the declaration of Yanbian was completely wrong and would defend the interests of the club and the player. On 4 April 2018, he made his debut for Bucheon in a 2–1 away defeat against Busan IPark in the 2018 Korean FA Cup, replacing Kim Ji-ho in the 82nd minute. Nan made his league debut on 27 October 2018 in a 2–0 home win over Suwon FC.

In April 2021, Nan signed for China League One side Sichuan Jiuniu F.C.

On 26 June 2026, the club annouanced his departure after the league game against Chengdu Rongcheng. On 3 July 2026, Nan joined another Chinese Super League club Qingdao West Coast.

== Career statistics ==
As of 18 July 2024

Appearances and goals by club, season and competition
Club	Season	League			National Cup		Continental		Other		Total	
Club	Season	Division	Apps	Goals	Apps	Goals	Apps	Goals	Apps	Goals	Apps	Goals
Bucheon FC 1995	2016	K League Challenge	0	0	0	0	-		-		0	0
Bucheon FC 1995	2018	K League 2	3	0	1	0	-		-		4	0
Bucheon FC 1995	2019	K League 2	0	0	0	0	-		-		0	0
Bucheon FC 1995	Total		3	0	1	0	0	0	0	0	4	0
Chongqing Lifan (loan)	2017	Chinese Super League	27	3	0	0	-		-		27	3
Sichuan Jiuniu	2021	China League One	30	2	5	0	-		-		35	2
Chongqing Liangjiang Athletic	2022	Chinese Super League	0	0	0	0	-		-		0	0
Sichuan Jiuniu/ Shenzhen Peng City	2022	China League One	31	1	1	0	-		-		32	1
Sichuan Jiuniu/ Shenzhen Peng City	2023	China League One	22	0	2	1	-		-		24	1
Sichuan Jiuniu/ Shenzhen Peng City	2024	Chinese Super League	10	0	1	0	-		-		11	0
Sichuan Jiuniu/ Shenzhen Peng City	Total		63	1	4	1	0	0	0	0	67	2
Career total			123	6	10	1	0	0	0	0	133	7

== Honours ==
=== Club ===
Shenzhen Peng City

- China League One: 2023
