= Róbson Duarte =

Brazilian footballer (born 1993)

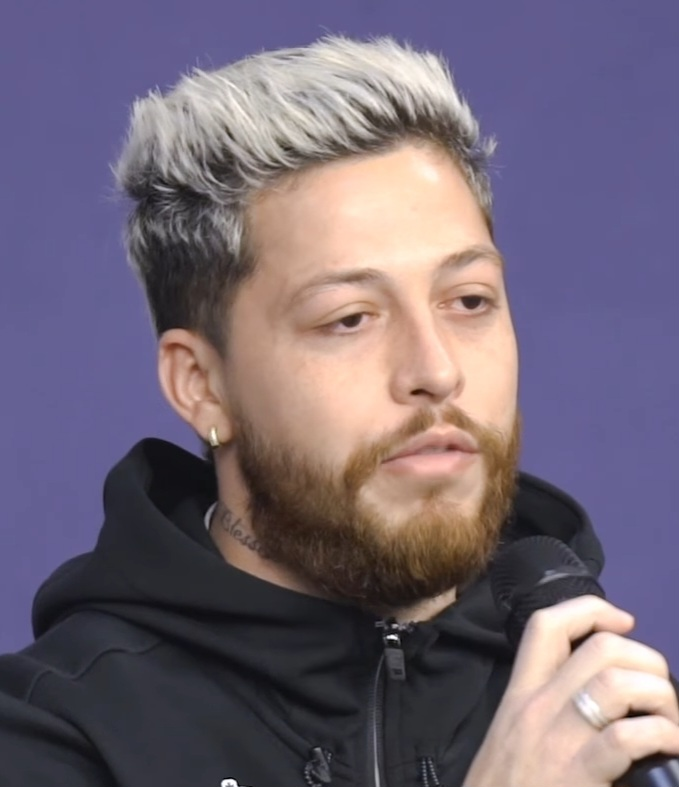

Personal information
- Full name: Róbson Carlos Duarte
- Date of birth: 20 June 1993 (age 33)
- Place of birth: Londrina, Brazil
- Height: 1.74 m (5 ft 9 in)
- Position: Winger

Team information
- Current team: Kanchanaburi Power
- Number: 70

Senior career*
| Years | Team | Apps | (Gls) |
| 2012 | América-SP | 11 | (1) |
| 2013 | Catanduvense | 20 | (1) |
| 2014 | Sorocaba | 8 | (1) |
| 2014 | → São Caetano (loan) | 7 | (0) |
| 2014 | Inter de Bebedouro | 4 | (1) |
| 2015 | URT | 8 | (0) |
| 2015 | Inter de Bebedouro | 23 | (12) |
| 2016 | Santo André | 19 | (2) |
| 2016–2018 | Ituano | 1 | (0) |
| 2017 | → Água Santa (loan) | 15 | (4) |
| 2018 | → Anapolina (loan) | 15 | (5) |
| 2018 | Goiás | 3 | (0) |
| 2018 | → Gwangju (loan) | 15 | (6) |
| 2019 | Seoul E-Land | 28 | (6) |
| 2020 | Paraná | 6 | (2) |
| 2020–2021 | Sampaio Corrêa | 25 | (1) |
| 2021–2022 | Ansan Greeners | 62 | (12) |
| 2023 | Chungnam Asan | 25 | (4) |
| 2023–2024 | Persebaya Surabaya | 13 | (1) |
| 2024 | Amazonas | 3 | (0) |
| 2025 | Londrina | 16 | (1) |
| 2026 | XV de Novembro | 5 | (0) |
| 2026– | Kanchanaburi Power | 0 | (0) |
- * Club domestic league appearances and goals as of 31 May 2026

Róbson Carlos Duarte (born 20 June 1993) is a Brazilian professional footballer who plays as a winger for Thai League 2 club Kanchanaburi Power.

== Career statistics ==
=== Club ===
As of 8 April 2019

| Club | Season | League | | | Cup | | Other | | Total | |
| Club | Season | Division | Apps | Goals | Apps | Goals | Apps | Goals | Apps | Goals |
|---|---|---|---|---|---|---|---|---|---|---|
| América-SP | 2012 | — | | | 0 | 0 | 11 (Note: Appearances in Campeonato Paulista A2) | 1 | 11 | 1 |
| Catanduvense | 2013 | — | | | 0 | 0 | 20 | 1 | 20 | 1 |
| Sorocaba | 2014 | — | | | 0 | 0 | 9 (Note: Appearances in Campeonato Paulista) | 1 | 9 | 1 |
| São Caetano (loan) | 2014 | Série C | 8 | 1 | 0 | 0 | 0 | 0 | 8 | 1 |
| URT | 2015 | — | | | 0 | 0 | 8 (Note: Appearances in Campeonato Mineiro) | 0 | 8 | 0 |
| Santo André | 2016 | — | | | 0 | 0 | 19 | 2 | 19 | 2 |
| Ituano | 2016 | Série D | 1 | 0 | 10 (Note: Appearances in Copa Paulista) | 0 | 0 | 0 | 11 | 0 |
| Água Santa | 2017 | — | | | 0 | 0 | 15 | 4 | 15 | 4 |
| Anapolina | 2018 | — | | | 0 | 0 | 15 (Note: Appearances in Campeonato Goiano) | 5 | 15 | 5 |
| Goiás | 2018 | Série B | 3 | 0 | 1 (Note: Appearances in Copa do Brasil) | 0 | 0 | 0 | 4 | 0 |
| Gwangju | 2018 | K League 2 | 14 | 6 | 0 | 0 | 1 (Note: Appearance in K League 2 promotion play-offs) | 0 | 15 | 6 |
| Seoul E-Land | 2019 | K League 2 | 3 | 0 | 1 | 0 | 0 | 0 | 4 | 0 |
| Career total | | | 29 | 7 | 12 | 0 | 98 | 14 | 139 | 21 |
