= Ismael Jorge Balea =

Uruguayan footballer (born 1993)

Personal information
- Date of birth: 27 January 1993 (age 33)
- Place of birth: Uruguay
- Position: Midfielder

Senior career*
Years	Team	Apps	(Gls)
-2012	Rayo Vallecano B	1	(0)
2012-2013	AD Villaviciosa de Odón		
2013-2014/15	CDA Navalcarnero		
2015/2016	Alcobendas CF		
2016-2017	Real Ávila CF	34	(6)
2017-2020	CA Pinto	44	(9)
2020	Ansan Greeners FC	3	(0)
2020	→ Gimpo Citizen FC (loan)	?	(?)
- * Club domestic league appearances and goals

Ismael Jorge Balea (born 27 January 1993 in Uruguay) is a Uruguayan footballer who now plays for Ansan Greeners in South Korea.

== Career ==
Balea started his senior career with Rayo Vallecano. After that, he played for AD Villaviciosa de Odón, CDA Navalcarnero, Alcobendas CF, Real Ávila CF, and CA Pinto. In 2020, he signed for Ansan Greeners in the South Korean K League 2, where he made three league appearances and scored zero goals.
