= Lee Young-min (footballer, born 1973) =

South Korean footballer

Personal information
- Full name: Lee Young-min
- Date of birth: 20 December 1973 (age 52)
- Place of birth: Busan, South Korea
- Height: 1.81 m (5 ft 11 1/2 in)
- Position: Defender

Team information
- Current team: FC Anyang

Youth career
- 1993–1996: Dong-a University

Senior career*
Years	Team	Apps	(Gls)
1996–1999	Pohang Steelers	0	(0)
2000–2006	Goyang Kookmin Bank	49	(1)

Managerial career
- 2007–2012: Goyang Kookmin Bank (assistant)
- 2012–2015: FC Anyang (assistant)
- 2015: FC Anyang (interim)
- 2015–16: FC Anyang
- 2018: Ansan Greeners FC
- 2020-: Bucheon FC 1995
- * Club domestic league appearances and goals

Lee Young-min (Korean: 이영민; born 20 December 1973) is a South Korean former footballer and current manager of Bucheon FC 1995. He played as defender.

== Managerial career ==
He was appointed as an interim manager of FC Anyang on 16 June 2015. He was promoted to full-time manager on 9 November.

== Managerial statistics ==
As of match played 1 August 2026

Managerial record by team and tenure
Team	Nat.	From	To	Record					Ref.
Team	Nat.	From	To	G	W	D	L	Win %	Ref.
Anyang	(South Korea)	16 June 2015	30 October 2016	68	24	20	24	35.29	
Ansan Greeners (caretaker)	(South Korea)	21 August 2018	30 September 2018	6	3	2	1	50.00	
Bucheon	(South Korea)	19 November 2020	Present	230	90	65	75	39.13	
Career Total				304	117	87	100	38.49	
