= Lee Hee-seong =

South Korean footballer (born 1990)

Personal information
- Date of birth: 27 May 1990 (age 36)
- Place of birth: South Korea
- Height: 1.85 m (6 ft 1 in)
- Position: Goalkeeper

Team information
- Current team: Ansan Greeners FC
- Number: 1

Senior career*
Years	Team	Apps	(Gls)
2011–2018	Ulsan Hyundai FC	10	(0)
2013	Ulsan Hyundai Mipo Dockyard FC→(loan)	15	(0)
2016	Yangju Citizen FC		
2018–	Ansan Greeners FC	205	(0)
- * Club domestic league appearances and goals as of 6 August 2026

Lee Hee-seong (Korean: 이희성; born 27 May 1990), also known as Lee Seung-Bin, in South Korea) is a South Korean footballer who plays as a goalkeeper for Ansan Greeners FC.

== Career ==
Lee started playing as goalkeeper in 5th grade because he thought that "saving while falling looked cool".

In high school, Lee was regarded as a better goalkeeper than future international Kim Seung-gyu, winning Most Valuable Player at the 2008 High School Challenge and giving the trophy to his dying father in the hospital. However, he later envied Kim, who played in the 2014 World Cup, and contemplated quitting football while playing for Ulsan Hyundai's reserves.

On the 17th of June 2015, Lee started against Jeonbuk Hyundai in his first league appearances that season. In the 37th minute, he struck his head against striker Lee Dong-gook's knee, causing a broken temple. The injury was life threatening, but he eventually recovered with the support of his girlfriend.
