= Baek Dong-kyu =

South Korean footballer

- Baek in 2026

Personal information
- Full name: Baek Dong-kyu
- Date of birth: 30 May 1991 (age 35)
- Place of birth: South Korea
- Height: 1.86 m (6 ft 1 in)
- Position: Defender

Team information
- Current team: Bucheon FC 1995
- Number: 29

Youth career
- 2010–2013: Dong-a University

Senior career*
Years	Team	Apps	(Gls)
2014–2015	FC Anyang	36	(0)
2015–2017	Jeju United	48	(0)
2018–2019	→ Sangju Sangmu (army)	33	(0)
2019–2020	Jeju United	19	(0)
2021–2023	Anyang	110	(5)
2024–2025	Suwon Bluewings	16	(0)
2025–	Bucheon FC 1995	37	(1)
- * Club domestic league appearances and goals as of 4 August 2026

Baek Dong-kyu (Korean: 백동규; born 30 May 1991) is a South Korean footballer who plays as defender for Bucheon FC 1995 in K League 1.

== Career ==
Baek was selected by FC Anyang in the 2014 K League draft. He joined Jeju United on 9 July 2015. On 31 May 2017, Baek charged onto the field while a substitute and struck Urawa player Yuki Abe in the late minute in a 2017 AFC Champions League match against Urawa Red Diamonds. Baek was given a red card even as a substitute He was banned for three months in all AFC-related matches and fined $15,000 for his violent conduct.
