= Yeo Bong-hun =

South Korean footballer

- Yeo in 2026

Personal information
- Date of birth: 12 March 1994 (age 32)
- Place of birth: South Korea
- Height: 1.78 m (5 ft 10 in)
- Position: Midfielder

Team information
- Current team: Bucheon
- Number: 25

Youth career
- 2011–2013: Andong High School

Senior career*
Years	Team	Apps	(Gls)
2014–2015	Alcorcón	0	(0)
2015	→ Marino (loan)	19	(0)
2015–2017	Gil Vicente	20	(1)
2016–2017	→ Vilaverdense (loan)	13	(1)
2017–2025	Gwangju FC	115	(3)
2022–2023	→ Chungju Citizen FC (loan)	23	(1)
2025	Chungbuk Cheongju FC	3	(0)
2026–	Bucheon	4	(0)

International career
2015	South Korea U-23		
- * Club domestic league appearances and goals as of 4 August 2026

Yeo Bong-hun (Korean: 여봉훈; born 12 March 1994) is a South Korean footballer who plays as midfielder for Bucheon. Besides South Korea, he has played in Spain and Portugal.

== Career ==
=== Club career ===
Bong-hun joined Segunda División B side Marino on loan right after signing with Alcorcón.

Ho moved to Portuguese club Gil Vicente in summer 2015.

He joined Gwangju FC in 2017 after terminating the contract with Gil Vicente.

In 2022, he joined Chungju Citizen FC on loan for his military service.

=== International career ===
He was called up for the South Korea U-23 in November 2015.
