= Moon Jeong-joo =

South Korean footballer

Moon Jeong-Joo
Personal information
- Full name: Moon Jeong-Joo
- Date of birth: 22 March 1990 (age 36)
- Place of birth: South Korea
- Height: 1.76 m (5 ft 9 1/2 in)
- Position: Midfielder

Team information
- Current team: Chungju Hummel
- Number: 13

Youth career
- Sunmoon University

Senior career*
Years	Team	Apps	(Gls)
2013	Chungju Hummel	29	(2)
2014–2015	Cheongju FC (military service)		
2016	Chuncheon		
- * Club domestic league appearances and goals as of 14 December 2013

Moon Jeong-Joo (Korean: 문정주; born 22 March 1990) is a South Korean footballer who played as midfielder for Chungju Hummel in K League Challenge.

== Career ==
He was selected by Chungju Hummel in the 2013 K League draft. He made his debut goal in his debut match against Police FC on 17 March 2013.
