= 2018 K League 2 =

KEB Hana Bank K League 2
- Season: 2018
- Champions: Asan Mugunghwa (1st title)
- Promoted: Seongnam FC
- Matches: 180
- Goals: 426 (2.37 per match)
- Best player: Na Sang-ho
- Top goalscorer: Na Sang-ho (16 goals)
- Biggest home win: Gwangju 5–0 Suwon FC (21 April 2018)
- Biggest away win: Seoul E 0–5 Busan (11 August 2018)
- Highest scoring: Busan 4–3 Anyang (29 July 2018)
- Highest attendance: 6,532; Busan 2–2 Gwangju (4 November 2018)
- Lowest attendance: 312; Seoul E 1–0 Anyang (14 April 2018)
- Average attendance: 1,672

The 2018 K League 2 was the sixth season of the K League 2, the second-highest division in the South Korean football league system.

Asan Mugunghwa once again grabbed an opportunity for promotion by winning its second K League 2 title (officially first title after Ansan era), but its owner Korean Police Agency did not recruit new players who could meet clubs' requisite for maintenance before the end of the season. Asan Mugunghwa, which was in the process of being dissolved, was finally disqualified from promoting.

Runners-up Seongnam FC directly qualified for the K League 1 instead of Asan Mugunghwa, and the third, fourth, and fifth-placed team advanced to the promotion playoffs.

== Teams ==
=== Team changes ===
Relegated from K League Classic

- Gwangju FC

Promoted to K League 1

- Gyeongnam FC

=== Stadiums ===
Ansan Greeners	FC Anyang	Asan Mugunghwa	Bucheon FC 1995	Busan IPark
Ansan Wa~ Stadium	Anyang Stadium	Yi Sun-sin Stadium	Bucheon Stadium	Busan Gudeok Stadium
Capacity: 35,000	Capacity: 17,143	Capacity: 19,283	Capacity: 34,545	Capacity: 12,349
Daejeon Citizen	Gwangju FC	Seongnam FC	Seoul E-Land	Suwon FC
Daejeon World Cup Stadium	Gwangju World Cup Stadium	Tancheon Stadium	Seoul Olympic Stadium	Suwon Sports Complex
Capacity: 40,535	Capacity: 40,245	Capacity: 16,146	Capacity: 69,950	Capacity: 11,808

=== Personnel and sponsoring ===
Note: Flags indicate national team as has been defined under FIFA eligibility rules. Players may hold more than one non-FIFA nationality.

Team	Managers	Kit manufacturer	Main sponsor
Ansan Greeners	(South Korea) Lee Heung-sil	Kelme	Ansan Government
FC Anyang	(South Korea) Ko Jeong-woon	Zaicro	Anyang Government
Asan Mugunghwa	(South Korea) Park Dong-hyuk	Puma	Asan Government
Bucheon FC 1995	(South Korea) Jeong Gab-seok	Astore	Bucheon Government
Busan IPark	(South Korea) Choi Yun-kyum	Adidas	Hyundai Development Company
Daejeon Citizen	(South Korea) Ko Jong-soo	Astore	Daejeon Government
Gwangju FC	(South Korea) Park Jin-sub	Joma	Gwangju Government
Seongnam FC	(South Korea) Nam Ki-il	Umbro	Seongnam Government
Seoul E-Land	(Argentina) In Chang-soo	New Balance	E-Land
Suwon FC	(South Korea) Cho Duck-je	Hummel	Suwon Government

=== Foreign players ===
Restricting the number of foreign players strictly to four per team, including a slot for a player from AFC countries. A team could use four foreign players on the field each game.

As of 24 July 2018.

Club	Player 1	Player 2	Player 3	Asian Player
Ansan Greeners	(Brazil) Fidel	(Liberia) Seku Conneh	(Uruguay) Raúl Tarragona	
FC Anyang	(Brazil) Wesley Alex	(Brazil) Marcos Antônio		
Bucheon FC 1995	(Brazil) Cristovam	(Brazil) Nilson Júnior	(Brazil) Willian Popp	(China) Nan Song
Busan IPark	(Brazil) Rômulo	(Netherlands) Arsenio Valpoort	(Netherlands) Sherjill MacDonald	
Daejeon Citizen	(Romania) Aurelian Chițu	(Slovakia) Filip Hlohovský	(Uzbekistan) Sanzhar Tursunov	(Uzbekistan) Shohrux Gadoyev
Gwangju FC	(Brazil) Gil	(Brazil) Felipe Silva	(Brazil) Róbson Duarte	(Japan) Minori Sato (Chinese Taipei) Wang Chien-ming (Note: Wang Chien-ming represented Chinese Taipei at international level, but he was considered Korean in the K League 2.)
Seongnam FC	(Brazil) Éder Lima	(Niger) Olivier Bonnes		
Seoul E-Land	(Argentina) Diego Bielkiewicz	(Chile) Ignacio Herrera	(Croatia) Ivan Herceg	
Suwon FC	(Brazil) Alex Lima	(Brazil) Alex Bruno	(Brazil) Fernando Viana	(Australia) Adrian Leijer

== League table ==
Pos	Team	Pld	W	D	L	GF	GA	GD	Pts	Qualification
1	Asan Mugunghwa (Note: Asan Mugunghwa was disqualified from promoting to the K League 1 due to lack of players who could meet clubs' requisite for maintenance. Therefore, runner-up Seongnam FC was directly promoted, and 5th-placed team Gwangju FC qualified for the promotion playoffs.) (C)	36	21	9	6	54	27	+27	72	
2	Seongnam FC (P)	36	18	11	7	49	36	+13	65	Promotion to the K League 1
3	Busan IPark	36	14	14	8	53	35	+18	56	Qualification for the promotion playoffs semi-final
4	Daejeon Citizen	36	15	8	13	47	44	+3	53	Qualification for the promotion playoffs first round
5	Gwangju FC	36	11	15	10	51	41	+10	48	Qualification for the promotion playoffs first round
6	FC Anyang	36	12	8	16	44	50	−6	44	
7	Suwon FC	36	13	3	20	29	46	−17	42	
8	Bucheon FC 1995	36	11	6	19	37	50	−13	39	
9	Ansan Greeners	36	10	9	17	32	45	−13	39	
10	Seoul E-Land	36	10	7	19	30	52	−22	37	

Source: K League
Rules for classification: 1) Points; 2) Goals scored; 3) Goal difference; 4) Wins; 5) Head-to-head points.
(C) Champions; (P) Promoted

== Positions by matchday ==
Leaders
Qualification for the promotion playoffs

=== Round 1–18 ===
Team ╲ Round	1	2	3	4	5	6	7	8	9	10	11	12	13	14	15	16	17	18
Asan Mugunghwa	2	2	3	4	5	3	2	4	4	3	3	3	3	2	2	1	2	1
Seongnam FC	4	6	4	5	2	4	3	1	1	1	1	1	1	1	1	2	1	2
Busan IPark	4	5	5	2	3	5	5	5	6	4	4	4	4	4	4	4	4	3
Bucheon FC 1995	1	1	1	1	1	1	1	2	2	2	2	2	2	3	3	3	3	4
Gwangju FC	6	7	8	8	8	8	8	6	5	6	7	7	7	5	6	7	5	5
Ansan Greeners	9	3	2	3	4	2	4	3	3	5	5	5	5	6	5	5	6	6
Suwon FC	2	4	7	7	7	7	6	7	9	9	8	9	9	9	9	9	8	7
Daejeon Citizen	8	10	6	6	6	6	7	8	7	7	6	6	6	7	7	6	7	8
FC Anyang	6	9	10	10	10	10	10	10	10	10	10	10	10	10	10	10	10	9
Seoul E-Land	9	8	8	9	9	9	9	9	8	8	9	8	8	8	8	8	9	10

Source: K League

=== Round 19–36 ===
Team ╲ Round	19	20	21	22	23	24	25	26	27	28	29	30	31	32	33	34	35	36
Asan Mugunghwa	2	2	2	2	2	1	1	2	2	2	1	1	1	1	1	1	1	1
Seongnam FC	1	1	1	1	1	2	2	1	1	1	2	2	2	2	2	2	2	2
Busan IPark	4	3	3	3	3	3	3	3	3	3	4	4	4	3	3	3	3	3
Daejeon Citizen	8	8	9	8	7	7	6	5	4	4	3	3	3	4	4	4	4	4
Gwangju FC	5	5	4	4	4	4	5	4	5	5	5	5	5	5	7	5	5	5
FC Anyang	10	9	10	9	9	9	9	8	8	9	8	8	6	6	5	6	6	6
Suwon FC	7	7	6	6	6	5	4	6	6	6	6	6	8	7	6	7	7	7
Bucheon FC 1995	3	4	5	5	5	6	7	7	7	7	7	7	7	8	9	8	8	8
Ansan Greeners	6	6	7	10	10	10	10	10	10	8	9	9	9	9	8	9	9	9
Seoul E-Land	9	10	8	7	8	8	8	9	9	10	10	10	10	10	10	10	10	10

Source: K League

== Results ==
=== Matches 1–18 ===
Home \ Away	ANS	ANY	ASM	BUC	BIP	DJC	GWJ	SEN	SEL	SUW
Ansan Greeners	—	2–1	0–2	3–1	1–3	3–2	2–0	2–1	0–2	1–0
FC Anyang	1–0	—	0–3	0–3	2–2	1–1	3–2	2–3	2–0	0–1
Asan Mugunghwa	1–0	1–1	—	4–2	1–1	0–1	1–2	4–2	3–0	2–0
Bucheon FC 1995	1–1	1–2	0–1	—	1–0	0–2	1–0	1–2	0–3	4–1
Busan IPark	1–1	3–0	1–0	1–2	—	3–3	0–1	1–1	2–0	1–1
Daejeon Citizen	1–1	3–2	1–2	1–2	0–1	—	1–2	1–2	1–0	0–2
Gwangju FC	0–0	0–0	2–2	1–2	1–1	0–1	—	1–3	3–0	5–0
Seongnam FC	0–0	1–1	1–0	2–1	0–1	4–2	0–0	—	1–1	2–1
Seoul E-Land	2–1	1–0	0–0	2–4	2–2	0–2	0–0	1–1	—	0–1
Suwon FC	1–0	1–0	0–2	0–1	1–0	1–2	0–1	1–4	1–0	—

Source: K League
Legend: Blue = home team win; Yellow = draw; Red = away team win.

=== Matches 19–36 ===
Home \ Away	ANS	ANY	ASM	BUC	BIP	DJC	GWJ	SEN	SEL	SUW
Ansan Greeners	—	0–2	0–1	3–1	0–1	1–1	3–2	0–1	0–0	0–1
FC Anyang	3–2	—	3–0	3–1	1–2	0–1	0–0	1–1	1–0	3–1
Asan Mugunghwa	2–0	2–1	—	0–0	0–0	2–2	1–0	1–0	3–1	2–1
Bucheon FC 1995	1–2	0–1	0–1	—	0–0	1–1	0–1	0–1	0–2	2–0
Busan IPark	0–0	4–3	1–2	1–1	—	1–2	2–2	2–0	3–1	0–1
Daejeon Citizen	1–0	2–2	2–1	3–0	0–1	—	1–1	0–1	1–0	1–0
Gwangju FC	4–0	2–1	1–1	1–1	3–3	1–2	—	3–1	2–2	0–2
Seongnam FC	1–1	1–0	1–1	2–1	1–0	2–0	2–2	—	1–2	0–0
Seoul E-Land	2–0	0–1	0–4	0–1	0–5	1–0	1–4	1–2	—	1–0
Suwon FC	1–2	3–0	0–1	2–0	0–3	3–2	1–1	0–1	0–2	—

Source: K League
Legend: Blue = home team win; Yellow = draw; Red = away team win.

== Promotion playoffs ==
=== Bracket ===
First round
4	Daejeon Citizen	1
5	Gwangju FC	0

Semi-final
3	Busan IPark	3
4	Daejeon Citizen	0

Final
Busan IPark	1	1	2
FC Seoul	3	1	4

=== First round ===
28 November 2018
19:00 KST

Daejeon Citizen	1–0	Gwangju FC
Chițu 68'	Report

Daejeon World Cup Stadium, Daejeon
Attendance: 3,121
Referee: Kim Hee-gon

=== Semi-final ===
1 December 2018
16:00 KST

Busan IPark	3–0	Daejeon Citizen
Rômulo 6'; Noh Haeng-seok 42'; Shin Young-jun 90+3'	Report

Busan Gudeok Stadium, Busan
Attendance: 8,132
Referee: Lee Dong-jun

=== Final ===
The promotion-relegation playoffs were held between the winners of the 2018 K League 2 playoffs and the 11th-placed club of the 2018 K League 1. The winners on aggregate score after both matches earned entry into the 2019 K League 1.

6 December 2018
19:00 KST

Busan IPark	1–3	FC Seoul
Rômulo 24'	Report	Cho Young-wook 58'; Go Yo-han 78'; Jung Hyun-cheol 89'

Busan Gudeok Stadium, Busan
Attendance: 10,127
Referee: Kim Woo-sung

9 December 2018
14:10 KST

FC Seoul	1–1	Busan IPark
Park Chu-young 90+3'	Report	Kim Jin-kyu 32'

Seoul World Cup Stadium, Seoul
Attendance: 8,554
Referee: Kim Dae-yong

FC Seoul won 4–2 on aggregate and therefore both clubs remain in their respective leagues.

== Player statistics ==
=== Top scorers ===
Rank	Player	Club	Goals
1	(South Korea) Na Sang-ho	Gwangju FC	16
2	(Brazil) Wesley Alex	FC Anyang	15
3	(Romania) Aurelian Chițu	Daejeon Citizen	11
4	(South Korea) Jung Sung-min	Seongnam FC	10
4	(Brazil) Willian Popp	Bucheon FC 1995	10
6	(South Korea) Ko Kyung-min	Busan IPark	9
6	(Brazil) Rômulo	Busan IPark	9
8	(Uzbekistan) Shohrux Gadoyev	Daejeon Citizen	8
9	7 players		7

=== Top assist providers ===
Rank	Player	Club	Assists
1	(Brazil) Rômulo	Busan IPark	9
2	(South Korea) Park Soo-il	Daejeon Citizen	8
2	(South Korea) Chang Hyuk-jin	Ansan Greeners	8
4	(South Korea) Moon Sang-yun	Seongnam FC	7
5	(South Korea) Jo Seong-joon	Asan Mugunghwa	6
6	(South Korea) Lee Euddeum	Asan Mugunghwa	6
6	(South Korea) Cho Chan-ho	Seoul E-Land	6
6	(South Korea) Lee Jae-kwon	Busan IPark	6
6	(South Korea) Lee Myung-joo	Asan Mugunghwa	6
6	(South Korea) Moon Ki-han	Bucheon FC 1995	6
6	(South Korea) Kim Dong-hyun	Gwangju FC	6

== Attendance ==
Attendants who entered with free ticket were not counted.

Pos	Team	Total	High	Low	Average	Change
1	Busan IPark	44,572	6,532	1,008	2,476	+3.0%
2	Seongnam FC	43,208	4,167	1,128	2,400	−14.3%
3	Suwon FC	33,792	3,060	815	1,877	−11.0%
4	Ansan Greeners	32,775	5,532	645	1,820	−32.6%
5	Asan Mugunghwa	31,594	4,039	844	1,755	−10.3%
6	Daejeon Citizen	29,617	4,142	418	1,645	−26.5%
7	Gwangju FC	27,393	5,439	464	1,522	−51.8%^{†}
8	FC Anyang	27,090	6,503	405	1,505	−54.9%
9	Bucheon FC 1995	18,464	1,655	618	1,026	−50.2%
10	Seoul E-Land	12,410	1,349	312	689	−57.2%
	League total	300,895	6,532	312	1,672	−28.2%

Source: K League
Notes:
^{†} Team played previous season in K League Classic.

== See also ==
- 2018 in South Korean football
- 2018 K League 1
- 2018 Korean FA Cup
