= No Yeon-bin =

South Korean footballer

Personal information
- Full name: No Yeon-bin
- Date of birth: 2 April 1990 (age 36)
- Place of birth: South Korea
- Height: 1.79 m (5 ft 10 1/2 in)
- Position: Defender

Team information
- Current team: Chungju Hummel
- Number: 8

Youth career
- 2009–2012: Cheongju University

Senior career*
Years	Team	Apps	(Gls)
2013	Cheonan City	23	(0)
2014–2016	Chungju Hummel	49	(1)
2016	→ Gyeongju KHNP (loan)	15	(0)
2017	Gyeongju KHNP	27	(1)
- * Club domestic league appearances and goals as of 23 December 2015

No Yeon-bin (Korean: 노연빈; born 2 April 1990) is a South Korean footballer who played as defender for Chungju Hummel in K League Challenge.

== Career ==
He was selected by Chungju Hummel in 2014 K League draft. He made his professional debut in the league match against Suwon FC on 29 March 2014.
