= Yoo Man-kee =

South Korean footballer

Yoo Man-Kee
Personal information
- Full name: Yoo Man-Kee
- Date of birth: 22 March 1988 (age 38)
- Place of birth: South Korea
- Height: 1.70 m (5 ft 7 in)
- Position: Midfielder

Team information
- Current team: Goyang Hi FC
- Number: 18

Youth career
- 2007–2010: Sungkyunkwan University

Senior career*
Years	Team	Apps	(Gls)
2011–2012	Suwon FC	37	(2)
2013–	Goyang Hi FC	28	(3)
- * Club domestic league appearances and goals as of 20 December 2013

Yoo Man-Kee (Korean: 유만기; born 22 March 1988) is a South Korean footballer who plays as midfielder for Goyang Hi FC in K League Challenge.

== Career ==
He joined Suwon FC after graduation.

He was selected by Goyang Hi FC in 2013 K League draft. He made his professional debut in the league match against FC Anyang on 17 March.
