= Kim Jong-seong =

South Korean footballer (born 1988)

Kim Jong-Seong
Personal information
- Full name: Kim Jong-Seong
- Date of birth: 12 March 1988 (age 38)
- Place of birth: South Korea
- Height: 1.87 m (6 ft 1 1/2 in)
- Position: Midfielder

Team information
- Current team: FC Anyang
- Number: 6

Youth career
- Ajou University

Senior career*
Years	Team	Apps	(Gls)
2011	Yongin City	18	(1)
2012–2013	Suwon FC	44	(2)
2014–	FC Anyang	42	(1)
- * Club domestic league appearances and goals as of 15 December 2015

Kim Jong-Seong (Korean: 김종성; born 12 March 1988) is a South Korean footballer who plays as midfielder for FC Anyang in K League Challenge.

== Career ==
He joined Yongin City in 2011 after graduating from college.
