= Park Chul =

South Korean footballer

Personal information
- Date of birth: August 20, 1973 (age 53)
- Place of birth: South Korea
- Height: 1.77 m (5 ft 10 in)
- Position: Defender

Youth career
- 1987–1989: Geoje High School
- 1990–1993: Daegu University

Senior career*
Years	Team	Apps	(Gls)
1994–1998	LG Cheethas / Anyang LG Cheetahs	58	(5)
1997–1998	→ Sangmu (military service)	?	(?)
1999–2002	Bucheon SK	96	(3)
2003–2005	Daejeon Citizen	51	(0)

International career^{‡}
1991–1993	South Korea U-20	4+?	(?)
1994	South Korea	0	(?)

Managerial career
- 2006: Kyungmin IT High School
- 2008–2009: Sorabol College (Coach)
- 2010: Sorabol College
- 2011–2014: Namhae Haesung High School
- 2016: Daejeon Citizen (Youth manager)
- 2017: Daejeon Citizen (Assistant coach)
- 2017–2020: Daejeon Citizen (Scout)
- 2019: Daejeon Citizen (Caretaker manager)
- 2021: Zibo Cuju
- * Club domestic league appearances and goals as of Sep 3 2011 ‡ National team caps and goals as of Sep 3 2011

- Park Chul
- Hangul: 박철
- Hanja: 朴徹
- RR: Bak Cheol
- MR: Pak Ch'ŏl

Park Chul (born August 20, 1973) is a South Korean professional football manager and former football player.

== Club career ==
He joined LG Cheetahs in 1994.

== International career ==
He participated in FIFA U-20 World Cup in 1991 and 1993.

== Managerial career ==
In February 2021, Park was appointed as new manager of China League One side Zibo Cuju.

== Career statistics ==
=== International ===
Scores and results list South Korea's goal tally first, score column indicates score after each Park Chul goal.

List of international goals scored by Park Chul
No.	Date	Venue	Opponent	Score	Result	Competition
1	19 June 1992	Suphachalasai Stadium, Bangkok, Thailand	Bangladesh	5–0	6–0	1992 AFC Asian Cup qualification
