= Kim Hyung-yul =

South Korean football manager (born 1964)

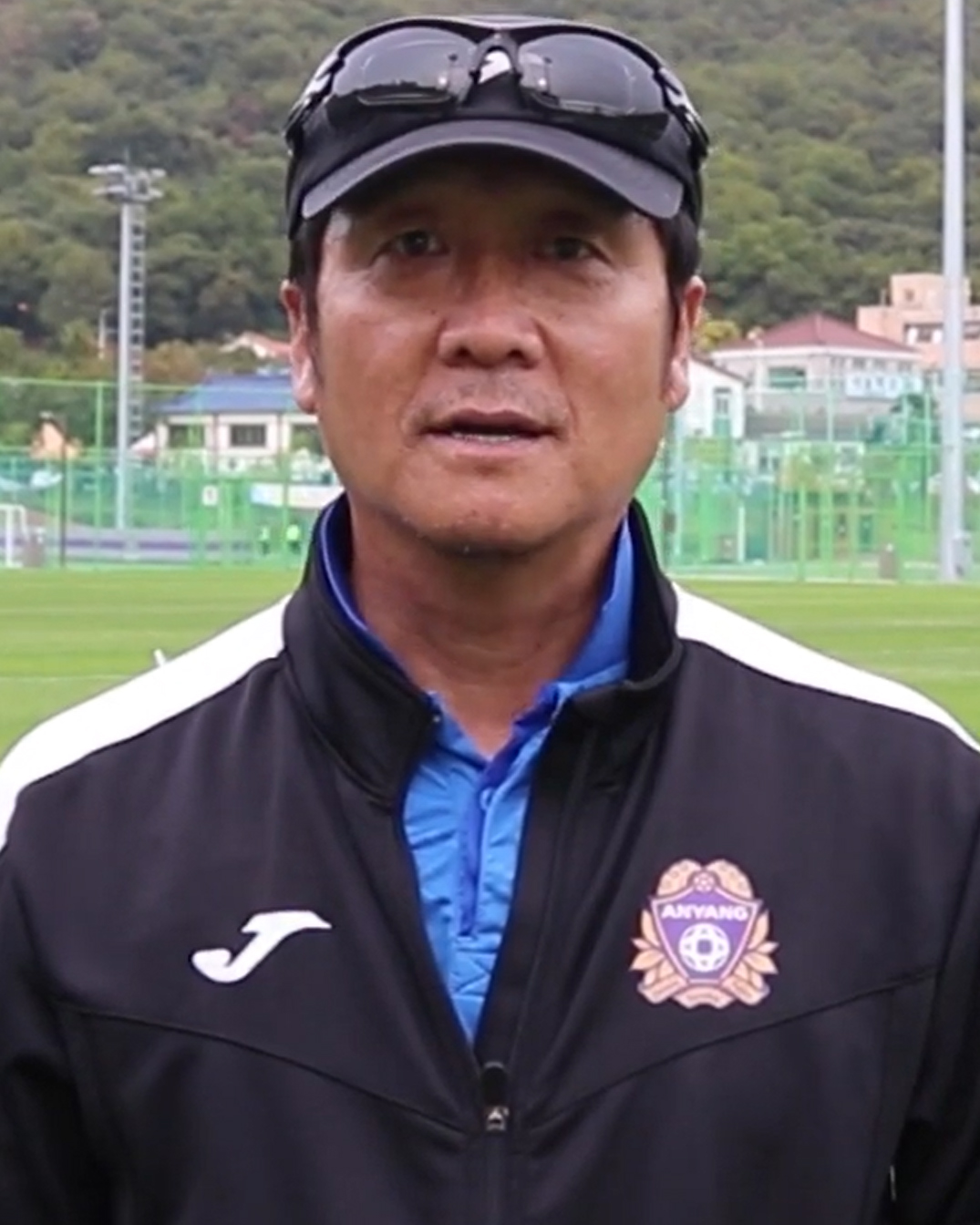
- Kim in 2019

Personal information
- Full name: Kim Hyung-yul
- Date of birth: 20 February 1964 (age 62)
- Place of birth: South Korea

Managerial career
- Years: Team
- 2001–2003: Kookmin Bank FC
- 2004–2005: Jeonbuk Hyundai (assistant)
- 2005: Jeonbuk Hyundai (caretaker)
- 2006–2008: Seongnam Ilhwa (assistant)
- 2010: Henan Jianye (assistant)
- 2012: Gangwon FC (assistant)
- 2015–2018: Catholic Kwandong University
- 2019–2020: FC Anyang

Kim Hyung-yul (Korean: 김형열; born 20 February 1964) is a South Korean football manager.

== Career ==
Kim appointed as manager of FC Anyang before the 2019 season started.
