= Yun Gi-hae =

South Korean footballer

Yun Gi-Hae
Personal information
- Full name: Yun Gi-Hae
- Date of birth: 9 February 1991 (age 35)
- Place of birth: South Korea
- Height: 1.85 m (6 ft 1 in)
- Position: Goalkeeper

Team information
- Current team: Gwangju FC
- Number: 21

Senior career*
Years	Team	Apps	(Gls)
2012–	Gwangju FC	10	(0)
- * Club domestic league appearances and goals as of 20 December 2013

Yun Gi-Hae (Korean: 윤기해; born 9 February 1991) is a South Korean footballer who plays as goalkeeper for Gwangju FC in the K-League.
