= Song Han-bok =

South Korean footballer (born 1984)

Song Han-Bok
Personal information
- Date of birth: 12 April 1984 (age 42)
- Place of birth: South Korea
- Height: 1.82 m (6 ft 0 in)
- Positions: Defender; midfielder

Senior career*
Years	Team	Apps	(Gls)
2003–2004	Ulsan Hyundai	0	(0)
2005–2010	Chunnam Dragons	16	(0)
2008–2009	→ Gwangju Sangmu (army)	29	(0)
2011–2013	Daegu FC	40	(0)
2014	Gwangju FC	6	(0)
2014– 2020	Cheonan City		

International career
2000	South Korea U-17		

Managerial career
- 2016–2021: Cheonan City (assistant)
- 2021: Ansan Greeners (assistant)
- 2023–2024: Ansan Greeners (assistant)
- 2025: Jeonnam Dragons (assistant)
- 2026–: Cheonan City (assistant)
- * Club domestic league appearances and goals as of 1 July 2014

- Song Han-bok
- Hangul: 송한복
- Hanja: 宋韓福
- RR: Song Hanbok
- MR: Song Hanbok

Song Han-Bok (Korean: 송한복; born 12 April 1984) is a South Korean football coach and former player, who is the current assistant manager of Cheonan City. His previous clubs were Ulsan Hyundai, Jeonnam Dragons, Daegu FC, Gwangju FC and he also played for Gwangju Sangmu while fulfilling his compulsory military service.

== Career statistics ==
As of 5 November 2011

Club performance			League		Cup		League Cup		Continental		Total	
Season	Club	League	Apps	Goals	Apps	Goals	Apps	Goals	Apps	Goals	Apps	Goals
South Korea			League		KFA Cup		League Cup		Asia		Total	
2003	Ulsan Hyundai	K-League	0	0	0	0	-		-		0	0
2004	Ulsan Hyundai	K-League	0	0	0	0	0	0	-		0	0
2005	Chunnam Dragons	K-League	0	0	0	0	0	0	-		0	0
2006	Chunnam Dragons	K-League	1	0	1	0	3	0	-		5	0
2007	Chunnam Dragons	K-League	1	0	0	0	0	0	-		1	0
2008	Gwangju Sangmu	K-League	14	0	2	0	7	0	-		23	0
2009	Gwangju Sangmu	K-League	15	0	0	0	1	0	-		16	0
2009	Chunnam Dragons	K-League	3	0	0	0	0	0	-		3	0
2010	Chunnam Dragons	K-League	13	0	0	0	1	0	-		14	0
2011	Daegu FC	K-League	23	0	1	0	1	0	-		25	0
Career total			70	0	4	0	13	0	-		84	0
