= Jeong Woo-jae =

South Korean footballer

Personal information
- Full name: Jeong Woo-jae
- Date of birth: 28 June 1992 (age 34)
- Place of birth: Yongin, South Korea
- Height: 1.79 m (5 ft 10 1/2 in)
- Position: Full back

Team information
- Current team: Chungnam Asan FC
- Number: 66

Youth career
- 2011–2013: Yewon Arts University

Senior career*
Years	Team	Apps	(Gls)
2014	Seongnam FC	2	(0)
2015	Chungju Hummel	26	(1)
2016–2018	Daegu FC	102	(5)
2019–2023	Jeju United	98	(6)
2023–2025	Jeonbuk Hyundai Motors	37	(0)
2025	Daegu FC	16	(0)
2026–	Chungnam Asan FC	2	(0)
- * Club domestic league appearances and goals as of 5 August 2026

Jeong Woo-jae (Korean: 정우재; Hanja: 鄭宇宰; born 28 June 1992) is a South Korean footballer who plays as full back for Chungnam Asan FC.

== Early life ==
Jeong Woo-jae was born in Yongjin, South Korea. He went to Yewon Arts University.

== Career ==
Jeong was selected by Seongnam FC in the 2014 K League draft. He played only two games for the club in 2014 and transferred to Chungju Hummel FC for 2015. He moved to Daegu FC in January 2016 after a successful season with Chungju.

Jeong joined Jeonbuk from Jeju in 2023.

== Career statistics ==
As of 5 December 2024

Appearances and goals by club, season and competition
Club	Season	League			Cup		Continental		Other		Total	
Club	Season	Division	Apps	Goals	Apps	Goals	Apps	Goals	Apps	Goals	Apps	Goals
Seongnam FC	2014	K League 1	2	0	0	0	—		—		2	0
Chungju Hummel	2015	K League 2	26	1	0	0	—		—		26	1
Daegu FC	2016	K League 2	37	3	2	0	—		—		39	3
Daegu FC	2017	K League 1	33	1	1	0	—		—		34	1
Daegu FC	2018	K League 1	32	1	1	0	—		—		33	1
Daegu FC	Total		102	5	4	0	—		—		106	5
Jeju United	2019	K League 1	11	0	0	0	—		—		11	0
Jeju United	2020	K League 1	21	3	1	0	—		—		22	3
Jeju United	2021	K League 1	38	3	0	0	—		—		38	3
Jeju United	2022	K League 1	28	0	1	0	—		—		29	0
Jeju United	Total		98	6	2	0	—		—		100	6
Jeonbuk Hyundai Motors	2023	K League 1	26	0	2	0	4	0	—		32	0
Jeonbuk Hyundai Motors	2024	K League 1	11	0	0	0	5	0	—		16	0
Jeonbuk Hyundai Motors	Total		37	0	2	0	9	0	—		48	0
Career total			265	12	8	0	9	0	0	0	282	12

== Honors and awards ==
=== Player ===
Seongnam FC

- Korean FA Cup Winners (1) : 2014

Daegu FC

- Korean FA Cup Winners (1) : 2018
