= Ahn Dong-eun =

South Korean footballer

Personal information
- Full name: Ahn Dong-eun
- Date of birth: 1 October 1988 (age 38)
- Place of birth: South Korea
- Height: 1.85 m (6 ft 1 in)
- Position: Defender

Team information
- Current team: Goyang Hi FC
- Number: 6

Youth career
- 2007–2010: Kyungwoon University

Senior career*
| Years | Team | Apps | (Gls) |
| 2011 | Suwon FC | 18 | (1) |
| 2012– | Ansan H FC / Goyang Hi FC | 56 | (6) |
| 2014 | → Ansan Police (military duty) | 6 | (0) |
- * Club domestic league appearances and goals as of 20 December 2015

Ahn Dong-eun (Korean: 안동은; born 1 October 1988) is a South Korean footballer who plays as defender for Goyang Hi FC in K League Challenge.

== Career ==
Dong-eun applied to the 2010 and 2011 K League draft but wasn't selected by any team, and he joined Korea National League side Suwon FC.

He made his professional league debut in the opening match of 2013 K League Challenge against FC Anyang.
