= Lim Wan-sup =

South Korean football manager

Lim Wan-Sup
Personal information
- Full name: Lim Wan-Sup
- Date of birth: 15 August 1971 (age 55)
- Place of birth: South Korea
- Position: Midfielder

Youth career
- Hanyang Technical High School

Senior career*
Years	Team	Apps	(Gls)
1991–1999	Kookmin Bank FC		

International career
1987	South Korea U-17		

Managerial career
- 2000–2004: Hanyang Technical High School (assistant)
- 2005–2010: Hanyang Middle School (assistant)
- 2010–2011: Namyangju United FC
- 2011–2013: Daejeon Citizen (assistant)
- 2014: Ansan Mugunghwa Youth
- 2015–2016: Ansan Mugunghwa (assistant)
- 2017: Gyeongnam FC (assistant)
- 2018–2019: Ansan Greeners
- 2020: Incheon United
- * Club domestic league appearances and goals

Lim Wan-Sup (Korean: 임완섭; born 15 August 1971) is a South Korean football manager and former footballer.

== Career ==
Lim was appointed as manager of Ansan Greeners in September 2018. Lim left Ansan Greeners on December 23, 2019, as a result of mutual termination. Lim was appointed the manager of Incheon United on February 6, 2020 to lead the club in the upcoming 2020 K League 1 season.
