= Kim Ryun-do =

South Korean footballer (born 1991)

Personal information
- Full name: Kim Ryun-do
- Date of birth: 9 July 1991 (age 35)
- Place of birth: South Korea
- Height: 1.87 m (6 ft 1 1/2 in)
- Position: Forward

Team information
- Current team: Cheonan City FC
- Number: 18

Youth career
- 2010–2013: Kwangwoon University

Senior career*
Years	Team	Apps	(Gls)
2014–2020	Bucheon FC 1995	134	(12)
2017–2018	→ Asan Mugunghwa (army)	22	(3)
2020–2022	Ansan Greeners	64	(14)
2022–2023	FC Anyang	35	(0)
2024–	Cheonan City FC	3	(0)
- * Club domestic league appearances and goals as of 19:28, 6 October 2022 (AEST)

Kim Ryun-do (Korean: 김륜도; born 9 July 1991) is a South Korean footballer who plays as forward for Cheonan City FC in K League 2.

== Career ==
He was selected by Bucheon FC 1995 in the 2014 K League draft.
