= Ansan Greeners FC =

South Korean association football club

- Full name: Ansan Greeners Football Club 안산 그리너스 FC
- Nickname: Green Wolves
- Founded: 2017; 9 years ago
- Ground: Ansan Wa~ Stadium
- Capacity: 35,000
- Owner: Ansan Government
- Chairman: Lee Min-geun (Mayor of Ansan)
- Manager: Choi Moon-sik
- League: K League 2
- 2026: K League 2, 15th of 17
- Website: www.greenersfc.com
Home colours	Away colours

The Ansan Greeners FC (Korean: 안산 그리너스 FC) are a South Korean professional football club based in Ansan. They compete in the K League 2, the second tier of the South Korean football league system. Founded in 2017, they play their home matches at Ansan Wa~ Stadium.

== History ==
On 22 July 2016, the Ansan Government officially announced the establishment of a professional football club based in Ansan. In October of the same year, Lee Heung-sil was appointed as the club's first manager.

Lim Wan-sup was the club's second manager, serving from September 2018 till December 2019, when he left by mutual termination. He was succeeded by Kim Gil-sik.

== Current squad ==
As of 24 June 2026

Note: Flags indicate national team as defined under FIFA eligibility rules; some limited exceptions apply. Players may hold more than one non-FIFA nationality.

No.	Pos.	Nation	Player
1	GK	KOR	Lee Seung-bin
2	MF	KOR	Jang Hyun-soo (vice-captain)
3	DF	KOR	Kang Dong-hyun
4	DF	KOR	Yeon Jei-min (captain)
5	MF	KOR	Yeon Eung-bin (on loan from Gimpo FC)
6	MF	KOR	Park Kyu-min
7	MF	KOR	Ryu Seung-woo (vice-captain)
8	MF	KOR	Jeong Hyun-woo
9	FW	SSD	Machop Chol
10	FW	BRA	Gabriel Lima
11	FW	KOR	Jung Kun-wook
13	FW	KOR	Kim Geon-oh
15	DF	SRB	Milan Obradović
16	FW	KOR	Park Chae-jun
17	FW	KOR	Ryu Seung-wan
18	FW	KOR	Park Jun-hyeok
19	FW	KOR	Lee Jae-hwan
20	DF	KOR	Song Beom

No.	Pos.	Nation	Player
21	GK	KOR	Kim Do-dam
22	FW	KOR	Jin Ho-jin
25	MF	KOR	Cho Ji-hun
26	MF	KOR	Rim Ji-min
28	MF	KOR	Kim Jeong-hyeon (on loan from Chungnam Asan)
29	DF	KOR	Kim Jun-hyeong
30	FW	KOR	Lee Jun-han
31	GK	KOR	Kim Min-jae
32	MF	KOR	Kim Seung-hyun
42	MF	KOR	Choi Dan
44	DF	SWE	Tim Hartzell
55	DF	KOR	Lee Hyo-jun
66	FW	KOR	Kim Baek-min
77	FW	BRA	Marlon
87	MF	KOR	Do Seung-woo
88	DF	KOR	Lee Gyu-bin
92	FW	KOR	Kim In-sung

=== Out on loan ===
Note: Flags indicate national team as defined under FIFA eligibility rules; some limited exceptions apply. Players may hold more than one non-FIFA nationality.

No.	Pos.	Nation	Player
—	MF	KOR	Kim Tae-baek (at Seosan Pioneer for military service)
—	FW	KOR	Choi Shin-woo (at Seosan Pioneer for military service)

No.	Pos.	Nation	Player
—	FW	KOR	Kim Min-young (at Jinju Citizen)

== Coaching staff ==
- Manager: (South Korea) Choi Moon-sik
- Assistant manager: (South Korea) Kim Dong-ki
- Coaches: (South Korea) Kim Dae-yeol, (South Korea) Lee Jeong-woo
- Goalkeeping coach: (South Korea) Jung Boo-sun
- Fitness coach: (South Korea) Lee Dong-hwan

Source: Official website

== Managerial history ==
No.	Name	From	To
1	(South Korea) Lee Heung-sil	30 October 2016	21 August 2018
C	(South Korea) Lee Young-min	21 August 2018	30 September 2018
2	(South Korea) Lim Wan-sup	30 September 2018	24 December 2019
3	(South Korea) Kim Gil-sik	31 December 2019	16 September 2021
C	(South Korea) Min Dong-sung	16 September 2021	25 November 2021
4	(South Korea) Cho Min-kook	25 November 2021	8 July 2022
C	(South Korea) Lim Jong-heon	8 July 2022	11 August 2022
5	(South Korea) Lim Jong-heon	11 August 2022	22 June 2023
C	(South Korea) Kim Jung-woo	23 June 2023	27 June 2023
C	(South Korea) Song Han-bok	27 June 2023	12 August 2023
6	(South Korea) Lim Kwan-sik	16 August 2023	11 July 2024
C	(South Korea) Song Han-bok	12 July 2024	11 August 2024
7	(South Korea) Lee Kwan-woo	11 August 2024	18 September 2025
C	(South Korea) Hong Seong-yo	18 September 2025	17 November 2025
8	(South Korea) Choi Moon-sik	17 November 2025	Present

== Season-by-season records ==
Season	League									Korea Cup	Top goalscorer (league only)	Manager(s)
Season	Div.	Pos.	Pl.	W	D	L	GF	GA	P	Korea Cup	Top goalscorer (league only)	Manager(s)
2017	2nd	9	36	7	12	17	36	54	33	Third round	Raúl Tarragona (15)	Lee Heung-sil
2018	2nd	9	36	10	9	17	32	45	39	Round of 32	Choi Ho-ju (7)	Lee Heung-sil; Lim Wan-sup
2019	2nd	5	36	14	8	14	46	42	50	Third round	Masatoshi Ishida (9); Gustavo Víntecinco (9)	Lim Wan-sup
2020	2nd	7	27	7	7	13	18	34	28	Third round	Kim Ryun-do (5)	Kim Gil-sik
2021	2nd	7	36	11	10	15	37	49	43	Third round	Kim Ryun-do (9)	Kim Gil-sik; Min Dong-sung
2022	2nd	9	40	8	13	19	49	67	37	Second round	Choi Geon-ju (7)	Cho Min-kook; Lim Jong-heon
2023	2nd	12	36	6	7	23	40	72	25	Third round	Yun Ju-tae (9)	Lim Jong-heon; Kim Jung-woo; Song Han-bok; Lim Kwan-sik
2024	2nd	11	36	9	10	17	35	48	37	Third round	Kim Do-yoon (5)	Lim Kwan-sik; Song Han-bok; Lee Kwan-woo
2025	2nd	14	39	5	12	22	25	60	27	Third round	Kim Hyun-tae (5)	Lee Kwan-woo; Hong Seong-yo; Choi Moon-sik
2026	2nd	15	32	8	5	19	37	60	29	Second round	Gabriel Lima (10)	Choi Moon-sik
