= Bucheon FC 1995 =

Association football club in South Korea

- Full name: Bucheon Football Club 1995
- Founded: 2007; 19 years ago
- Ground: Bucheon Stadium
- Capacity: 34,456
- Owner: Bucheon Government
- Chairman: Cho Yong-ik (Mayor of Bucheon)
- Manager: Lee Young-min
- League: K League 1
- 2025: K League 2, 3rd of 14 (promoted via play-offs)
- Website: bfc1995.com
Home colours	Away colours

Bucheon Football Club 1995 (Korean: 부천FC 1995) is a South Korean professional football club based in Bucheon that competes in the K League 1, the top tier of South Korean football. The club was founded in 2007 by a group of former Bucheon SK supporters after its move to Jeju in early 2006.

== History ==
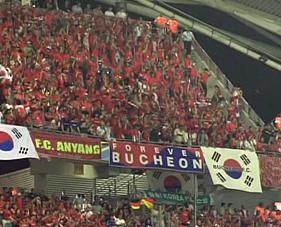
A "Forever Bucheon" banner, displayed by fans behind the movement to create the new Bucheon FC at a 2006 FIFA World Cup match between South Korea and France.

Within weeks of the relocation of Bucheon SK, fans started a movement to form a brand new team in Bucheon, with an initial goal of creating a team to participate in the 2007 Korea National League season. However, the considerable financial requirements for entry to the National League, coupled with the launch of the K3 League in 2007, led to them readjusting their target and focusing on entry to the K3 League in 2008.

During the course of 2007, deals with several major sponsors, including Sportstoto, Daum and SK Energy, were negotiated. On 25 October 2007, the club's name, Bucheon FC 1995, was announced, and the club was officially founded on 1 December.

Bucheon FC 1995 became a professional club and gained approval to join the second-tier K League Challenge on 5 December 2012. In their first season as a professional club, they finished in seventh place.

In the 2025 K League 2 season, the club finished third in the regular season and then went on to defeat the K League 1 side Suwon FC in the promotion-relegation play-offs to win promotion to the top flight for the first time.

== Club culture ==
Bucheon's supporters' group is called Hermes, which started as supporters of Bucheon SK.

The club has a heated local rivalry with Incheon United, with whom they contest the '032 derby', with the name owing to their shared calling code (032). They are also one of the several South Korean phoenix clubs contesting 'relocation derbies' with clubs that once played in their city, and they contest their relocation derby with Jeju SK.

== Players ==
=== Current squad ===
As of 15 August 2026

Note: Flags indicate national team as defined under FIFA eligibility rules; some limited exceptions apply. Players may hold more than one non-FIFA nationality.

No.	Pos.	Nation	Player
1	GK	KOR	Kim Hyung-geun
2	DF	KOR	Kim Jong-min
3	DF	BRA	Patrick William
4	MF	KOR	Sung Ye-geon
6	MF	KOR	Jeong Ho-jin
7	DF	BRA	Thiaguinho Santos
8	MF	KOR	Yoon Bit-garam
9	FW	KOR	Park Jeong-in
10	FW	BRA	Rodrigo Bassani (vice-captain)
11	FW	BRA	Jefferson Galego
13	MF	KOR	Kim Min-jun
14	MF	KOR	Kim Jong-woo
16	MF	KOR	Kim Sang-jun
17	FW	KOR	Kim Gyu-min
18	FW	KOR	Lee Eui-hyung
19	MF	KOR	Sung Shin
20	DF	KOR	Hong Sung-wook
21	GK	KOR	Kim Hyeon-yeop

No.	Pos.	Nation	Player
22	FW	KOR	Han Ji-ho (captain)
23	MF	JPN	Kazuki Takahashi
24	MF	KOR	Kim Dong-hyeon
25	MF	KOR	Yeo Bong-hun
26	DF	KOR	An Tae-hyun
27	FW	KOR	Uh Dam
29	DF	KOR	Baek Dong-kyu (vice-captain)
31	GK	KOR	Lee Sang-hyeon (on loan from Incheon United)
44	DF	KOR	Lee Ye-chan
63	FW	BRA	Vitor Gabriel
66	DF	KOR	Yu Seung-hyun
71	MF	KOR	Kim Seung-bin
77	DF	KOR	Shin Jae-won (vice-captain)
83	DF	KOR	Jo Seong-joon
88	MF	KOR	Kang Jae-woo
93	DF	KOR	Lee Jae-won
99	FW	BRA	Gustavo Nescau

=== Out on loan ===
Note: Flags indicate national team as defined under FIFA eligibility rules; some limited exceptions apply. Players may hold more than one non-FIFA nationality.

No.	Pos.	Nation	Player
—	DF	KOR	Kim Won-june (at Changwon FC)
—	DF	KOR	Lee Sang-hyeok (at Gimcheon Sangmu for military service)
—	DF	KOR	Nam Hyun-wook (at Siheung Citizen)

No.	Pos.	Nation	Player
—	MF	KOR	Hong Gi-uk (at Jincheon HR)
—	FW	KOR	Lee Chung-hyun (at 1. FC Magdeburg)

== Backroom staff ==
=== Coaching staff ===
- Manager: (South Korea) Lee Young-min
- Head coach: (South Korea) Ma Hyun-uk
- Coach: (South Korea) Ko Kyung-min
- Goalkeeping coach: (South Korea) Kim Jee-woon
- Physical coach: (South Korea) Park Hyo-jun

=== Support staff ===
- Technical director: (South Korea) Kwon Oh-ghu
- Physical therapist: (South Korea) Choi Hwan-seok
- Medical trainers: (South Korea) Yoo Ho-jun, (South Korea) Jang Woo-hyuk
- Analyst: (South Korea) Kim Hyeong-cheol
- Interpreter: (South Korea) Ko Kang-jae
- Kit manager: (South Korea) Oh Dong-young

Source: Official website

== Records ==
=== Season-by-season ===
Season	Division	Tms.	Pos.	Cup
2008	K3 League	16	13	—
2009	K3 League	17	4	—
2010	Challengers League	18	7	Second round
2011	Challengers League	16	8	First round
2012	Challengers League	18	8	First round
2013	K League Challenge	8	7	Second round
2014	K League Challenge	10	10	Third round
2015	K League Challenge	11	5	Round of 32
2016	K League Challenge	11	3	Semi-finals
2017	K League Challenge	10	5	Round of 16
2018	K League 2	10	8	Third round
2019	K League 2	10	4	Third round
2020	K League 2	10	8	Second round
2021	K League 2	10	10	Third round
2022	K League 2	11	4	Quarter-finals
2023	K League 2	13	5	Second round
2024	K League 2	13	8	Round of 16
2025	K League 2	14	3 ↑	Semi-finals
2026	K League 1	12		

Colour key

Promoted ↑	Relegated ↓
