= 2014 in South Korean football =

Football in South Korea
- Season: 2014

Men's football
- K League Classic: Jeonbuk Hyundai Motors
- K League Challenge: Daejeon Citizen
- National League: Hyundai Mipo Dockyard
- K3 League: Hwaseong FC
- Korean FA Cup: Seongnam FC

Women's football
- WK League: Incheon Hyundai Steel Red Angels

This article shows a summary of the 2014 football season in South Korea.

== National teams ==
=== FIFA World Cup ===
Hong Myung-bo became the national team manager one year before the 2014 World Cup, and had to prepare for the competition in a short period of time. He called up the players who had won the bronze medal at the 2012 Summer Olympics under his leadership, but the team performed below par in the World Cup. They were pelted with yeot (a traditional Korean confectionery, which can sometimes be used to express insults) when they returned to South Korea.

17 June Group H	Russia	1–1	South Korea	Cuiabá, Brazil
18:00 BRT–1 (UTC−4)	Kerzhakov 74'	Report	Lee Keun-ho 68'	Stadium: Arena Pantanal; Attendance: 37,603; Referee: Néstor Pitana (Argentina)

22 June Group H	South Korea	2–4	Algeria	Porto Alegre, Brazil
16:00 BRT (UTC−3)	Son Heung-min 50'; Koo Ja-cheol 72'	Report	Slimani 26'; Halliche 28'; Djabou 38'; Brahimi 62'	Stadium: Estádio Beira-Rio; Attendance: 42,732; Referee: Wilmar Roldán (Colombia)

26 June Group H	South Korea	0–1	Belgium	São Paulo, Brazil
17:00 BRT (UTC−3)		Report	Vertonghen 78'	Stadium: Arena Corinthians; Attendance: 61,397; Referee: Ben Williams (Australia)

Group H table
Pos	Team	Pld	W	D	L	GF	GA	GD	Pts	Qualification
1	Belgium	3	3	0	0	4	1	+3	9	Advance to knockout stage
2	Algeria	3	1	1	1	6	5	+1	4	Advance to knockout stage
3	Russia	3	0	2	1	2	3	–1	2	
4	South Korea	3	0	1	2	3	6	–3	1	

=== AFC U-22 Championship ===
11 January Group A	South Korea	1–1	Jordan	Muscat, Oman
17:00 GST (UTC+04:00)	Lim Chang-woo 43'	Report	Lim Chang-woo 31' (o.g.)	Stadium: Royal Oman Police Stadium, Muscat; Attendance: 400; Referee: Mohd Amirul Izwan (Malaysia)

13 January Group A	Myanmar	0–3	South Korea	Muscat, Oman
17:00 GST (UTC+04:00)		Report	Baek Sung-dong 32'; Yun Il-lok 61'; Moon Chang-jin 78'	Stadium: Royal Oman Police Stadium, Muscat; Attendance: 103; Referee: Mohanad Qasim Eesee Sarray (Iraq)

15 January Group A	Oman	0–2	South Korea	Muscat, Oman
20:00 GST (UTC+04:00)		Report	Kim Kyung-jung 62'; Yun Il-lok 80'	Stadium: Sultan Qaboos Sports Complex, Muscat; Attendance: 6,000; Referee: Ma Ning (China PR)

Group A table
Pos	Team	Pld	W	D	L	GF	GA	GD	Pts	Qualification
1	Jordan	3	2	1	0	8	2	+6	7	Advance to knockout stage
2	South Korea	3	2	1	0	6	1	+5	7	Advance to knockout stage
3	Oman (H)	3	1	0	2	4	3	+1	3	
4	Myanmar	3	0	0	3	1	13	−12	0	

Source: AFC
(H) Hosts

19 January Quarter-finals	Syria	1–2	South Korea	Seeb, Oman
17:00 GST (UTC+04:00)	Mardikian 90+5'	Report	Baek Sung-dong 3'; Hwang Ui-jo 11'	Stadium: Seeb Stadium, Seeb; Attendance: 300; Referee: Hettikamkanamge Perera (Sri Lanka)

23 January Semi-finals	South Korea	0–1	Iraq	Seeb, Oman
17:00 GST (UTC+04:00)		Report	Nadhim 74'	Stadium: Seeb Stadium, Seeb; Attendance: 2,600; Referee: Muhammad Taqi Aljaafari Bin Jahari (Singapore)

25 January Third place match	Jordan	0–0 (a.e.t.) (3–2 p)	South Korea	Seeb, Oman
19:30 GST (UTC+04:00)		Report		Stadium: Seeb Stadium, Seeb; Attendance: 337; Referee: Yaqoob Abdul Baki (Oman)
	Penalties
	Al-Dardour (penalty scored); Zahran (penalty scored); Al-Khawaldeh (penalty missed); Abu Amarah (penalty scored)		(penalty missed) Baek Sung-dong; (penalty missed) Moon Chang-jin; (penalty scored) Nam Seung-woo; (penalty scored) Lim Chang-woo; (penalty missed) Yun Il-lok

=== Asian Games ===
14 September Group A	South Korea	3–0	Malaysia	Incheon, South Korea
17:00 KST (UTC+09)	Rim Chang-woo 27'; Kim Shin-wook 78'; Kim Seung-dae 82'	Report		Stadium: Incheon Munhak Stadium, Incheon; Attendance: 38,500; Referee: Abdullah Balideh (Qatar)

17 September Group A	South Korea	1–0	Saudi Arabia	Ansan, South Korea
20:00 KST (UTC+09)	Kim Seung-dae 12'	Report		Stadium: Ansan Wa~ Stadium, Ansan; Attendance: 23,850; Referee: Ma Ning (China)

21 September Group A	Laos	0–2	South Korea	Hwaseong City, South Korea
17:00 KST (UTC+09)		Report	Lee Jong-ho 42'; Kim Seung-dae 89'	Stadium: Hwaseong Stadium, Hwaseong City; Attendance: 21,272; Referee: Ma Ning (China)

Group A table
Pos	Team	Pld	W	D	L	GF	GA	GD	Pts	
1	South Korea (H)	3	3	0	0	6	0	+6	9	Advance to knockout stage
2	Saudi Arabia	3	2	0	1	6	1	+5	6	Advance to knockout stage
3	Malaysia	3	1	0	2	4	6	−2	3	
4	Laos	3	0	0	3	0	9	−9	0	

Source: RSSSF
(H) Hosts

25 September Round of 16	South Korea	3–0	Hong Kong	Goyang City, South Korea
20:00 KST (UTC+09)	Lee Yong-jae 59'; Park Joo-ho 76'; Kim Jin-su 90+3'	Report		Stadium: Goyang Stadium, Goyang City; Attendance: 17,962; Referee: Mohamed Al Zarouni (United Arab Emirates)

28 September Quarter-finals	South Korea	1–0	Japan	Incheon, South Korea
17:00 KST (UTC+09)	Jang Hyun-soo 88' (pen.)	Report		Stadium: Incheon Munhak Stadium, Incheon; Attendance: 43,221; Referee: Marai Al Awaji (Saudi Arabia)

30 September Semi-finals	South Korea	2–0	Thailand	Incheon, South Korea
20:00 KST (UTC+09)	Lee Jong-ho 41'; Jang Hyun-soo 45+1' (pen.)	Report		Stadium: Incheon Munhak Stadium, Incheon; Attendance: 23,555; Referee: Mohamed Al Zarouni (United Arab Emirates)

2 October Final	South Korea	1–0 (a.e.t.)	North Korea	Incheon, South Korea
20:00 KST (UTC+09)	Rim Chang-woo 120+1'	Report		Stadium: Incheon Munhak Stadium, Incheon; Attendance: 47,121; Referee: Abdullah Balideh (Qatar)

=== Friendlies ===
==== Senior team ====
25 January	South Korea	1–0	Costa Rica	Los Angeles, United States
15:00	Kim Shin-wook 9'	Report		Stadium: LA Memorial Coliseum; Attendance: 15,000; Referee: Baldomero Toledo (United States)

29 January	South Korea	0–4	Mexico	San Antonio, United States
20:00		Report	Peralta 37'; Pulido 45+1', 86', 89'	Stadium: Alamodome; Attendance: 54,313; Referee: Héctor Rodríguez (Honduras)

1 February	United States	2–0	South Korea	Carson, United States
14:00 PST	Wondolowski 4', 60'	Report		Stadium: StubHub Center; Attendance: 27,000; Referee: Hugo Cruz (Costa Rica)

5 March	Greece	0–2	South Korea	Athens, Greece
		Report	Park Chu-young 18'; Son Heung-min 55'	Stadium: Karaiskakis Stadium; Attendance: 7,600; Referee: Ovidiu Hațegan (Romania)

28 May	South Korea	0–1	Tunisia	Seoul, South Korea
20:00		Report	Dhaouadi 44'	Stadium: Seoul World Cup Stadium; Attendance: 57,112; Referee: Martin Atkinson (England)

9 June	South Korea	0–4	Ghana	Miami, United States
19:00 UTC−5		Report	J. Ayew 11', 53', 89'; Gyan 44'	Stadium: Sun Life Stadium; Attendance: 7,000; Referee: David Gantar (Canada)

5 September	South Korea	3–1	Venezuela	Bucheon, South Korea
20:00 UTC+9	Lee Myung-joo 33'; Lee Dong-gook 53', 64'	Report	M. Rondón 21'	Stadium: Bucheon Sports Complex; Attendance: 34,456; Referee: Võ Minh Trí (Vietnam)

8 September	South Korea	0–1	Uruguay	Goyang, South Korea
20:00 UTC+9		Report	Giménez 70'	Stadium: Goyang Sports Complex; Attendance: 38,183; Referee: Ryuji Sato (Japan)

10 October	South Korea	2–0	Paraguay	Cheonan, South Korea
20:00 UTC+9	Kim Min-woo 27'; Nam Tae-hee 32'	Report		Stadium: Cheonan Stadium; Attendance: 25,156; Referee: Valentin Kovalenko (Uzbekistan)

14 October	South Korea	1–3	Costa Rica	Seoul, South Korea
20:00 UTC+9	Lee Dong-gook 45+1'	Report	Borges 37', 47'; Duarte 78'	Stadium: Seoul World Cup Stadium; Attendance: 39,210; Referee: Alireza Faghani (Iran)

14 November	Jordan	0–1	South Korea	Amman, Jordan
16:30		Report	Han Kyo-won 34'	Stadium: Amman International Stadium; Attendance: 8,500; Referee: Abdelameer Abdelshaheed (Bahrain)

18 November	Iran	1–0	South Korea	Tehran, Iran
16:25	Azmoun 83'	Report		Stadium: Azadi Stadium; Attendance: 52,000; Referee: Valentin Kovalenko (Uzbekistan)

==== Under-23 team ====
22 May	Brazil	2–0	South Korea	Toulon, France
17:15 CEST	Thalles 27'; Luan 80+1'	Report		Stadium: Stade Léo-Lagrange, Toulon; Attendance: 2,000; Referee: Jérôme Efong Nzolo (Belgium)

24 May	South Korea	1–1	Qatar U19	Hyères, France
15:45 CEST	Shin Il-soo 19'	Report	Doozandeh 61' (pen.)	Stadium: Stade Perruc, Hyères; Attendance: 600; Referee: Eduardo Gamboa (Chile)

26 May	Colombia U19	0–1	South Korea	Saint-Raphaël, France
17:15 CEST		Report	Moon Chang-jin 68' (pen.)	Stadium: Stade Louis Hon, Saint-Raphaël; Attendance: 600; Referee: José Alfredo Peñaloza (Mexico)

28 May	England	1–1	South Korea	Aubagne, France
19:30 CEST	Woodrow 3'	Report	Lee Chang-min 55'	Stadium: Stade de Lattre-de-Tassigny, Aubagne; Attendance: 500; Referee: Eduardo Gamboa (Chile)

1 June	South Korea	2–1	Kuwait A	Incheon, South Korea
16:00 KST (UTC+09)	Kim Seung-dae 19'; Jang Hyun-soo 90+4' (pen.)		Alhajeri 39'	Stadium: Incheon Asiad Main Stadium, Incheon; Attendance: 51,000; Referee: Hiroyuki Kimura (Japan)

14 November	China	1–1	South Korea	Wuhan, China
19:30 CST (UTC+08)	Wu Xinghan 54'		Lee Yeong-jae 45'	Stadium: Wuhan Sports Center Stadium, Wuhan; Attendance: 2,693; Referee: Sivakorn Pu-Udom (THA)

16 November	South Korea	0–3	Brazil	Wuhan, China
16:00 CST (UTC+08)			Felipe Anderson 39'; Rayder Matos 41'; Felipe Gedoz 90'	Stadium: Wuhan Sports Center Stadium, Wuhan; Referee: Shen Yinhao (China PR)

18 November	South Korea	0–1	Australia	Wuhan, China
16:00 CST (UTC+08)			Ugarković 36'	Stadium: Wuhan Sports Center Stadium, Wuhan; Attendance: 537; Referee: Fu Ming (China PR)

== Leagues ==
=== K League Classic ===
Pos	Team	Pld	W	D	L	GF	GA	GD	Pts	Qualification or relegation
1	Jeonbuk Hyundai Motors (C)	38	24	9	5	60	22	+38	81	Qualification for Champions League group stage
2	Suwon Samsung Bluewings	38	19	10	9	52	37	+15	67	Qualification for Champions League group stage
3	FC Seoul	38	15	13	10	42	28	+14	58	Qualification for Champions League playoff round
4	Pohang Steelers	38	16	10	12	50	39	+11	58	
5	Jeju United	38	14	12	12	39	36	+3	54	
6	Ulsan Hyundai	38	13	11	14	44	43	+1	50	
7	Jeonnam Dragons	38	14	9	15	48	53	−5	51	
8	Busan IPark	38	10	13	15	37	49	−12	43	
9	Seongnam FC	38	9	13	16	32	39	−7	40	Qualification for Champions League group stage (Note: Qualified as champions of FA Cup.)
10	Incheon United	38	8	16	14	33	46	−13	40	
11	Gyeongnam FC (R)	38	7	15	16	30	52	−22	36	Qualification for relegation playoffs
12	Sangju Sangmu (R)	38	7	13	18	39	62	−23	34	Relegation to K League Challenge

Source: RSSSF
Rules for classification: 1) Points; 2) Goal difference; 3) Goals scored
(C) Champions; (R) Relegated

=== K League Challenge ===
==== Regular season ====
Pos	Team	Pld	W	D	L	GF	GA	GD	Pts	Qualification
1	Daejeon Citizen (C, P)	36	20	10	6	64	36	+28	70	Promotion to K League Classic
2	Ansan Police	36	16	11	9	58	48	+10	59	Qualification for promotion playoffs semi-final
3	Gangwon FC	36	16	6	14	48	50	−2	54	Qualification for promotion playoffs first round
4	Gwangju FC (O, P)	36	13	12	11	40	35	+5	51	Qualification for promotion playoffs first round
5	FC Anyang	36	15	6	15	49	52	−3	51	
6	Suwon FC	36	12	12	12	52	49	+3	48	
7	Daegu FC	36	13	8	15	50	47	+3	47	
8	Goyang Hi FC	36	11	14	11	36	41	−5	47	
9	Chungju Hummel	36	6	16	14	37	57	−20	34	
10	Bucheon FC 1995	36	6	9	21	33	52	−19	27	

Source: K League
Rules for classification: 1) Points; 2) Goal difference; 3) Goals scored
(C) Champions; (O) Play-off winners; (P) Promoted

==== Promotion playoffs ====
Gwangju FC were promoted to the K League Classic, while Gyeongnam FC were relegated to the K League Challenge.

First round
3	Gangwon FC	0
4	Gwangju FC	1

Semi-final
2	Ansan Police	0
Gwangju FC	3

Final
Gwangju FC	3	1	4
Gyeongnam FC	1	1	2

=== Korea National League ===
==== Regular season ====
Pos	Team	Pld	W	D	L	GF	GA	GD	Pts	Qualification or relegation
1	Daejeon Korail	27	14	7	6	41	28	+13	49	Qualification for playoffs final
2	Hyundai Mipo Dockyard (C)	27	14	6	7	44	28	+16	48	Qualification for playoffs semi-final
3	Gyeongju KHNP	27	14	6	7	41	28	+13	48	Qualification for playoffs first round
4	Gangneung City	27	10	11	6	41	33	+8	41	Qualification for playoffs first round
5	Busan Transportation Corporation	27	12	4	11	30	32	−2	40	
6	Changwon City	27	11	3	13	38	38	0	36	
7	Cheonan City	27	10	4	13	25	30	−5	34	
8	Mokpo City	27	8	8	11	28	39	−11	32	
9	Gimhae City	27	6	8	13	25	42	−17	26	
10	Yongin City	27	4	7	16	30	45	−15	19	

Source: Korea National League
Rules for classification: 1) Points; 2) Goal difference; 3) Goals scored
(C) Champions

==== Championship playoffs ====
First round
3	Gyeongju KHNP	2	4	6
4	Gangneung City	1	2	3

Semi-final
2	Hyundai Mipo Dockyard	1	2	3
Gyeongju KHNP	1	1	2

Final
Hyundai Mipo Dockyard	2	1	3
1	Daejeon Korail	0	1	1

=== K3 League ===
==== Group A ====
Pos	Team	Pld	W	D	L	GF	GA	GD	Pts	Qualification
1	FC Pocheon	25	21	3	1	68	23	+45	66	Qualification for playoffs final
2	Icheon Citizen	25	17	3	5	70	32	+38	54	Qualification for playoffs first round
3	Jungnang Chorus Mustang	25	14	6	5	53	28	+25	48	Qualification for playoffs first round
4	Chungbuk Cheongju	25	12	6	7	60	38	+22	42	
5	Gyeongju Citizen	25	12	2	11	51	36	+15	38	
6	Yeonggwang FC	25	8	5	12	31	37	−6	29	
7	Seoul United	25	6	4	15	28	52	−24	22	
8	Goyang Citizen	25	3	3	19	29	60	−31	12	
9	Seoul FC Martyrs	25	1	0	24	23	167	−144	3	

Source: JoinKFA (in Korean)
Rules for classification: 1) Points; 2) Goal difference; 3) Goals scored

==== Group B ====
Pos	Team	Pld	W	D	L	GF	GA	GD	Pts	Qualification
1	Hwaseong FC (C)	25	19	2	4	64	27	+37	59	Qualification for playoffs semi-final
2	Paju Citizen	25	13	8	4	45	23	+22	47	Qualification for playoffs first round
3	Chuncheon FC	25	11	9	5	49	29	+20	42	Qualification for playoffs first round
4	Jeonju FC	25	10	7	8	49	33	+16	37	
5	Yangju Citizen	25	10	5	10	43	46	−3	35	
6	FC Uijeongbu	25	8	6	11	49	50	−1	30	
7	Gwangju Gwangsan	25	6	7	12	38	40	−2	25	
8	Gimpo Citizen (Note: Gimpo Citizen was deducted 9 points.)	25	9	2	14	53	51	+2	20	
9	Cheonan FC	25	4	4	17	19	50	−31	16	

Source: JoinKFA (in Korean)
Rules for classification: 1) Points; 2) Goal difference; 3) Goals scored
(C) Champions

==== Championship playoffs ====
First round
3	Icheon Citizen	3
6	Chuncheon FC	1
4	Jungnang Chorus Mustang	1
5	Paju Citizen (a.e.t.)	2

Second round
Icheon Citizen	2
Paju Citizen	1

Semifinal
2	Hwaseong FC (p)	1 (11)
Icheon Citizen	1 (10)

Final
1	FC Pocheon	1
Hwaseong FC	3

=== WK League ===
==== Regular season ====
Pos	Team	Pld	W	D	L	GF	GA	GD	Pts	Qualification
1	Incheon Hyundai Steel Red Angels (C)	24	16	5	3	49	14	+35	53	Qualification for playoffs final
2	Goyang Daekyo Noonnoppi	24	12	10	2	34	20	+14	46	Qualification for playoffs semi-final
3	Seoul WFC	24	10	6	8	28	29	−1	36	Qualification for playoffs semi-final
4	Daejeon Sportstoto	24	8	8	8	32	30	+2	32	
5	Suwon FMC	24	8	5	11	20	31	−11	29	
6	Busan Sangmu	24	4	6	14	23	45	−22	18	
7	Jeonbuk KSPO	24	4	4	16	26	43	−17	16	

Source: KWFF
Rules for classification: 1) Points; 2) Goal difference; 3) Goals scored
(C) Champions

==== Championship playoffs ====
Semi-final			Final
			1	Incheon Hyundai Steel Red Angels	1	0	1
2	Goyang Daekyo Noonnoppi	1		Goyang Daekyo Noonnoppi	0	0	0
3	Seoul WFC	0

== Domestic cups ==
=== Korean FA Cup ===
Round of 32
Busan IPark (p)	1 (5)
Jungnang Chorus Mustang	1 (3)
Jeju United	3 (4)
Suwon FC (p)	3 (5)
FC Seoul (a.e.t.)	3
Incheon United	2
Pohang Steelers (a.e.t.)	0 (4)
FC Anyang	0 (3)
Cheonan City (a.e.t.)	1
Hannam University	0
Suwon Samsung Bluewings	0 (3)
Sangju Sangmu (p)	0 (4)
Gangwon FC (a.e.t.)	3
Hongik University	2
Hyundai Mipo Dockyard (p)	1 (5)
Gyeongju KHNP	1 (4)
Ulsan Hyundai	3
Soongsil University	1
Jeonbuk Hyundai Motors	3
Jeonnam Dragons	1
Gyeongnam FC	1
Gangneung City	2
Daejeon Citizen	1
FC Pocheon	2
Seongnam FC	1
Daegu FC	0
Gwangju FC	1
Bucheon FC 1995	0
Daejeon Korail (a.e.t.)	1
Changwon City	0
Ajou University	1
Yeungnam University	2

Round of 16
Busan IPark (a.e.t.)	3
Suwon FC	2
FC Seoul (p)	2 (4)
Pohang Steelers	2 (2)
Cheonan City	0
Sangju Sangmu	1
Gangwon FC (p)	2 (3)
Hyundai Mipo Dockyard	2 (2)
Ulsan Hyundai	1
Jeonbuk Hyundai Motors	2
Gangneung City	1
FC Pocheon	0
Seongnam FC (a.e.t.)	2
Gwangju FC	1
Daejeon Korail	1 (4)
Yeungnam University (p)	1 (5)

Quarter-finals
Busan IPark	1
FC Seoul (a.e.t.)	2
Sangju Sangmu (p)	1 (6)
Gangwon FC	1 (5)
Jeonbuk Hyundai Motors	3
Gangneung City	2
Seongnam FC	2
Yeungnam University	1

Semi-finals
22 October – Sangju
FC Seoul	1
Sangju Sangmu	0
22 October – Jeonju
Jeonbuk Hyundai Motors	0 (4)
Seongnam FC (p)	0 (5)

Final
23 November – Seoul
FC Seoul	0 (2)
Seongnam FC (p)	0 (4)

=== Korea National League Championship ===
==== Group stage ====
Group A
Pos	Team	Pld	Pts
1	Gyeongju KHNP	4	6
2	Hyundai Mipo Dockyard	4	6
3	Gimhae City	4	4
4	Busan Transportation Corporation	4	4
5	Cheonan City	4	2

Group B
Pos	Team	Pld	Pts
1	Gangneung City	4	10
2	Mokpo City	4	8
3	Daejeon Korail	4	7
4	Yongin City	4	3
5	Changwon City	4	0

==== Knockout stage ====
Semifinals
A1	Gyeongju KHNP	2
B2	Mokpo City	1
B1	Gangneung City	3
A2	Hyundai Mipo Dockyard	1

Final
Gyeongju KHNP	2
Gangneung City	1

== International cups ==
=== AFC Champions League ===
Team	Result	Round	Aggregate	Score	Venue	Opponent
FC Seoul	Semi-finals	Group F	Winners	2–0	Home	(Australia) Central Coast Mariners
FC Seoul	Semi-finals	Group F	Winners	1–0	Away	(Australia) Central Coast Mariners
FC Seoul	Semi-finals	Group F	Winners	1–1	Away	(China) Beijing Guoan
FC Seoul	Semi-finals	Group F	Winners	2–1	Home	(China) Beijing Guoan
FC Seoul	Semi-finals	Group F	Winners	1–2	Away	(Japan) Sanfrecce Hiroshima
FC Seoul	Semi-finals	Group F	Winners	2–2	Home	(Japan) Sanfrecce Hiroshima
FC Seoul	Semi-finals	Round of 16	4–4 (a)	3–2	Away	(Japan) Kawasaki Frontale
FC Seoul	Semi-finals	Round of 16	4–4 (a)	1–2	Home	(Japan) Kawasaki Frontale
FC Seoul	Semi-finals	Quarter-finals	0–0 (3–0 p)	0–0	Away	(South Korea) Pohang Steelers
FC Seoul	Semi-finals	Quarter-finals	0–0 (3–0 p)	0–0 (a.e.t.)	Home	(South Korea) Pohang Steelers
FC Seoul	Semi-finals	Semi-finals	0–2	0–0	Home	(Australia) Western Sydney Wanderers
FC Seoul	Semi-finals	Semi-finals	0–2	0–2	Away	(Australia) Western Sydney Wanderers
Jeonbuk Hyundai Motors	Round of 16	Group G	Runners-up	3–0	Home	(Japan) Yokohama F. Marinos
Jeonbuk Hyundai Motors	Round of 16	Group G	Runners-up	1–2	Away	(Japan) Yokohama F. Marinos
Jeonbuk Hyundai Motors	Round of 16	Group G	Runners-up	2–2	Away	(Australia) Melbourne Victory
Jeonbuk Hyundai Motors	Round of 16	Group G	Runners-up	0–0	Home	(Australia) Melbourne Victory
Jeonbuk Hyundai Motors	Round of 16	Group G	Runners-up	1–3	Away	(China) Guangzhou Evergrande
Jeonbuk Hyundai Motors	Round of 16	Group G	Runners-up	1–0	Home	(China) Guangzhou Evergrande
Jeonbuk Hyundai Motors	Round of 16	Round of 16	1–3	1–2	Home	(South Korea) Pohang Steelers
Jeonbuk Hyundai Motors	Round of 16	Round of 16	1–3	0–1	Away	(South Korea) Pohang Steelers
Pohang Steelers	Quarter-finals	Group E	Winners	1–1	Home	(Japan) Cerezo Osaka
Pohang Steelers	Quarter-finals	Group E	Winners	2–0	Away	(Japan) Cerezo Osaka
Pohang Steelers	Quarter-finals	Group E	Winners	2–1	Away	(Thailand) Buriram United
Pohang Steelers	Quarter-finals	Group E	Winners	0–0	Home	(Thailand) Buriram United
Pohang Steelers	Quarter-finals	Group E	Winners	2–2	Home	(China) Shandong Luneng
Pohang Steelers	Quarter-finals	Group E	Winners	4–2	Away	(China) Shandong Luneng
Pohang Steelers	Quarter-finals	Round of 16	3–1	2–1	Away	(South Korea) Jeonbuk Hyundai Motors
Pohang Steelers	Quarter-finals	Round of 16	3–1	1–0	Home	(South Korea) Jeonbuk Hyundai Motors
Pohang Steelers	Quarter-finals	Quarter-finals	0–0 (0–3 p)	0–0	Home	(South Korea) FC Seoul
Pohang Steelers	Quarter-finals	Quarter-finals	0–0 (0–3 p)	0–0 (a.e.t.)	Away	(South Korea) FC Seoul
Ulsan Hyundai	Group stage	Group H	Third place	3–1	Away	(Australia) Western Sydney Wanderers
Ulsan Hyundai	Group stage	Group H	Third place	0–2	Home	(Australia) Western Sydney Wanderers
Ulsan Hyundai	Group stage	Group H	Third place	2–0	Home	(Japan) Kawasaki Frontale
Ulsan Hyundai	Group stage	Group H	Third place	1–3	Away	(Japan) Kawasaki Frontale
Ulsan Hyundai	Group stage	Group H	Third place	1–1	Home	(China) Guizhou Renhe
Ulsan Hyundai	Group stage	Group H	Third place	1–3	Away	(China) Guizhou Renhe

== See also ==
- Football in South Korea
