= 2017 K3 League Advanced =

K3 League Advanced
- Season: 2017
- Dates: 25 February – 14 October 2017
- Champions: FC Pocheon (6th title)
- Matches: 132
- Goals: 352 (2.67 per match)
- Best player: Park Jung-soo
- Top goalscorer: Kim Woon
- Best goalkeeper: Park Jun-hyuk

The 2017 K3 League Advanced was the eleventh season of the amateur K3 League, a South Korean association football league.

== Teams ==
Club	City	Stadium	Manager
Cheongju City	Cheongju	Heungdeok Football Park	(South Korea) Seo Won-sang
Chungbuk Cheongju	Cheongju	Cheongju Stadium	(South Korea) Kim Jong-hyun
Chuncheon FC	Chuncheon	Chuncheon Stadium	(South Korea) Kim Yong-ho
Gimpo Citizen	Gimpo	Gimpo City Stadium	(South Korea) Yoo Jong-wan
Gyeongju Citizen	Gyeongju	Gyeongju Civic Stadium	(South Korea) Kim Jin-hyung
Hwaseong FC	Hwaseong	Hwaseong Stadium	(South Korea) Kim Jong-boo
Icheon Citizen	Icheon	Icheon City Stadium	(South Korea) Lee Hyun-chang
Jeonju FC	Jeonju	Jeonju University ground	(South Korea) Yang Young-cheol
Paju Citizen	Paju	Paju Public Stadium	(South Korea) Oh Won-jae
FC Pocheon	Pocheon	Pocheon Stadium	(South Korea) In Chang-soo
Yangju Citizen	Yangju	Yangju Stadium	(South Korea) Lee Seung-hee
Yangpyeong FC	Yangpyeong	Yangpyeong Stadium	(South Korea) Cha Seung-yong

== Regular season ==
=== League table ===
Pos	Team	Pld	W	D	L	GF	GA	GD	Pts	Qualification or relegation
1	FC Pocheon (C)	22	12	8	2	31	19	+12	44	Qualification for the Championship final
2	Cheongju City	22	8	11	3	33	23	+10	35	Qualification for the Championship first round
3	Hwaseong FC	22	9	8	5	30	26	+4	35	Qualification for the Championship first round
4	Yangpyeong FC	22	11	2	9	25	28	−3	35	Qualification for the Championship first round
5	Gimpo Citizen	22	9	6	7	28	26	+2	33	Qualification for the Championship first round
6	Icheon Citizen	22	9	5	8	43	32	+11	32	
7	Chungbuk Cheongju	22	7	9	6	18	19	−1	30	
8	Gyeongju Citizen	22	7	5	10	36	36	0	26	
9	Jeonju FC	22	7	5	10	30	36	−6	26	
10	Chuncheon FC	22	7	3	12	23	29	−6	24	
11	Paju Citizen (R)	22	6	6	10	22	31	−9	24	Relegation to the K3 League Basic
12	Yangju Citizen (R)	22	4	4	14	33	47	−14	16	Relegation to the K3 League Basic

Source: KFA Soccerway
Rules for classification: 1) Points; 2) Goal difference; 3) Goals scored.
(C) Champions; (R) Relegated

=== Results ===
Home \ Away	POC	CHE	HWA	YAN	GIM	ICH	CC	GYE	JEO	CHU	PAJ	YC
FC Pocheon	—	1–1	1–1	1–0	2–1	2–1	0–0	2–1	3–0	1–0	0–0	2–1
Cheongju City	1–1	—	2–2	0–0	1–2	2–1	1–1	3–2	2–2	2–1	2–0	1–1
Hwaseong FC	0–0	1–0	—	2–0	2–2	4–3	0–0	3–1	0–4	0–2	1–0	1–0
Yangpyeong FC	2–1	0–1	0–2	—	3–3	2–1	1–0	1–3	1–0	1–0	1–0	2–4
Gimpo Citizen	1–1	2–2*	0–0*	2–0	—	2–1	0–1	2–0	1–0	0–1	3–0*	2–1
Icheon Citizen	3–4	2–0	2–0	2–3	2–0	—	2–2	2–1	2–2	1–0	1–1	2–1
Chungbuk Cheongju	0–0	1–1	0–0	0–1	0–1	3–2	—	0–5	2–1	0–0	0–0	2–0*
Gyeongju Citizen	2–0	1–1	2–3	2–1	1–2	2–2	1–3	—	2–2	3–3	2–1	2–1
Jeonju FC	2–4	0–4	2–1	1–2	1–1	0–0	1–0	2–1	—	0–1	1–3	2–0
Chuncheon FC	0–1	0–1	1–4	0–1	1–0	0–5	1–0	0–1	3–0	—	1–2	4–1
Paju Citizen	0–1	0–3	2–1	2–0	3–1	0–3	0–1	0–0	0–2	3–3	—	4–3
Yangju Citizen	2–3	2–2	2–2	0–3	3–0	1–3	1–2	2–1	3–5	2–1	1–1	—

Source: JoinKFA
Legend: Blue = home team win; Yellow = draw; Red = away team win.

== Championship playoffs ==
When the first round and semi-final matches were finished as draws, their winners were decided on the regular season rankings without extra time and the penalty shoot-out.

=== Bracket ===
First round
2	Cheongju City	3
5	Gimpo Citizen	3
3	Hwaseong FC	1
4	Yangpyeong FC	1

Semi-final
2	Cheongju City	0
3	Hwaseong FC	0

Final
FC Pocheon (a.e.t.)	0	2	2
Cheongju City	1	0	1

=== First round ===
4 November 2017

Cheongju City	3–3	Gimpo Citizen

Cheongju Stadium, Cheongju

4 November 2017

Hwaseong FC	1–1	Yangpyeong FC

Hwaseong Stadium, Hwaseong

=== Semi-final ===
13 November 2017

Cheongju City	0–0	Hwaseong FC

Cheongju Stadium, Cheongju

=== Final ===
18 November 2017

Cheongju City	1–0	FC Pocheon

Cheongju Stadium, Cheongju

25 November 2017

FC Pocheon	2–0 (a.e.t.)	Cheongju City

Pocheon Stadium, Pocheon

FC Pocheon won 2–1 on aggregate.

== See also ==
- 2017 in South Korean football
- 2017 Korean FA Cup
