= 2015 K3 League =

K3 League
- Season: 2015
- Dates: 7 March – 21 November 2015
- Champions: FC Pocheon (4th title)
- Matches: 230
- Goals: 961 (4.18 per match)
- Best Player: Lee Sang-yong
- Top goalscorer: Park Dong-hee (30 goals)
- Best goalkeeper: Choi An-seong

The 2015 K3 League was the ninth season of the amateur K3 League in South Korea. The top three clubs of each group qualified for the championship playoffs after the home and away season of two groups (16 matches per team) and the interleague play (9 matches per team). The first-placed team in the overall table directly qualified for the final and the other group winners advanced to the semi-final. The interleague games had to have penalty shootouts when a game ended in a draw, with 2 points awarded for a penalty shootout win, and 0.5 point awarded for a penalty shootout defeat.

== Teams ==
Club	City	Stadium	Manager
Cheonan FC	Cheonan	Cheonan Football Center	(South Korea) Seo Won-sang
Chungbuk Cheongju	Cheongju	Cheongju Stadium	(South Korea) Kim Jong-hyun
Chuncheon FC	Chuncheon	Chuncheon Stadium	(South Korea) Kim Yong-ho
Gimpo Citizen	Gimpo	Gimpo City Stadium	(South Korea) Yoo Jong-wan
Goyang Citizen	Goyang	Goyang Eoulimnuri ground	(South Korea) Kim Jin-ok
Gyeongju Citizen	Gyeongju	Gyeongju Civic Stadium	(South Korea) Kim Jin-hyung
Hwaseong FC	Hwaseong	Hwaseong Stadium	(South Korea) Kim Jong-boo
Icheon Citizen	Icheon	Icheon City Stadium	(South Korea) Lee Hyun-chang
Jeonju FC	Jeonju	Jeonju University ground	(South Korea) Yang Young-cheol
Jungnang Chorus Mustang	Seoul	Jungnang Public Ground	(South Korea) Yoo Bong-ki
Paju Citizen	Paju	Paju Public Stadium	(South Korea) Oh Won-jae
Pyeongchang FC	Pyeongchang	Pyeongchang Stadium	(South Korea) Hwang Young-woo
FC Pocheon	Pocheon	Pocheon Stadium	(South Korea) In Chang-soo
Seoul FC Martyrs	Seoul	Gangbuk Stadium	(South Korea) Kim Yong-hae
Seoul United	Seoul	Madeul Stadium	(South Korea) Kim Chang-kyum
Yangju Citizen	Yangju	Yangju Stadium	(South Korea) Lee Seung-hee
Yeonggwang FC	Yeonggwang	Yeonggwang Sportium	(South Korea) Kim Han-bong
FC Uijeongbu	Uijeongbu	Uijeongbu Stadium	(South Korea) Kim Hee-tae

== Regular season ==
=== Group A ===
Pos	Team	Pld	W	D*	LP	L	GF	GA	GD	Pts	Qualification
1	FC Pocheon	25	22	2	1	0	104	17	+87	68.5	Qualification for the playoffs final
2	Gyeongju Citizen	25	16	2	1	6	73	28	+45	50.5	Qualification for the playoffs first round
3	Paju Citizen	25	15	3	1	6	56	22	+34	48.5	Qualification for the playoffs first round
4	Icheon Citizen	25	14	4	0	7	58	23	+35	46	
5	Cheonan FC	25	9	5	0	11	61	43	+18	32	
6	Jeonju FC	25	8	1	2	14	43	54	−11	26	
7	Pyeongchang FC	25	8	0	2	15	37	47	−10	25	
8	Uijeongbu	25	7	1	0	17	46	62	−16	22	
9	Seoul FC Martyrs	25	0	0	0	25	9	284	−275	−3	

Source: JoinKFA Soccerway
Rules for classification: 1) Points; 2) Goal difference; 3) Goals scored.

=== Group B ===
Pos	Team	Pld	W	D*	LP	L	GF	GA	GD	Pts	Qualification
1	Gimpo Citizen	25	17	5	0	3	81	22	+59	56	Qualification for the playoffs semi-final
2	Hwaseong FC	25	18	2	0	5	65	36	+29	56	Qualification for the playoffs first round
3	Yangju Citizen	25	12	5	0	8	65	37	+28	41	Qualification for the playoffs first round
4	Jungnang Chorus Mustang	25	12	1	1	11	48	37	+11	37.5	
5	Chuncheon FC	25	11	3	1	10	46	42	+4	36.5	
6	Cheongju FC	25	10	4	0	11	52	51	+1	34	
7	Yeonggwang FC	25	6	4	0	15	37	42	−5	22	
8	Goyang Citizen	25	7	1	0	17	31	57	−26	22	
9	Seoul United	25	5	4	0	16	51	59	−8	19	

Source: JoinKFA Soccerway
Rules for classification: 1) Points; 2) Goal difference; 3) Goals scored.

== Championship playoffs ==
First round
A2	Gyeongju Citizen	3
B3	Yangju Citizen	2
B2	Hwaseong FC	2
A3	Paju Citizen	1

Second round
Hwaseong FC	0 (7)
Gyeongju Citizen (p)	0 (8)

Semifinal
B1	Gimpo Citizen	2 (3)
Gyeongju Citizen (p)	2 (5)

Final
A1	FC Pocheon	1
Gyeongju Citizen	0

=== First round ===
31 October 2015

Gyeongju Citizen	3–2	Yangju Citizen

Gyeongju Citizen Stadium, Gyeongju

31 October 2015

Hwaseong FC	2–1	Paju Citizen

Hwaseong Stadium, Hwaseong

=== Second round ===
7 November 2015

Hwaseong FC	0–0 (a.e.t.)	Gyeongju Citizen
Penalties
	7–8

Hwaseong Stadium, Hwaseong

=== Semi-final ===
14 November 2015

Gimpo Citizen	2–2 (a.e.t.)	Gyeongju Citizen
Penalties
	3–5

Gimpo Stadium, Gimpo

=== Final ===
21 November 2015

FC Pocheon	1–0	Gyeongju Citizen

Pocheon Stadium, Pocheon

== See also ==
- 2015 in South Korean football
- 2015 Korean FA Cup
