= 2014 K3 Challengers League =

Daum K3 Challengers League
- Season: 2014
- Dates: 8 March - 29 November 2014
- Champions: Hwaseong FC (1st title)
- Matches: 230
- Goals: 822 (3.57 per match)
- Best Player: Kim Hyo-gi
- Top goalscorer: Choi Yoo-sang (26 goals)
- Best goalkeeper: Lim Hyeong-geun

The 2014 K3 Challengers League, known as the Daum K3 Challengers League 2014, was the eighth season of the amateur K3 League. The top three clubs of each group qualified for the championship playoffs after the home-and-away season of two groups (16 matches per team) and the interleague play (9 matches per team). The first and second-placed teams in the overall table advanced to the final and semi-final respectively, and the other four clubs advanced to the first round. Asan United withdrew from the league, while FC Uijeongbu joined the league.

== Teams ==
| Club | City | Stadium | Manager |
|---|---|---|---|
| Cheonan FC | Cheonan | Cheonan Football Center | (South Korea) Seo Won-sang |
| Chungbuk Cheongju | Cheongju | Cheongju Stadium | (South Korea) Kim Jong-hyun |
| Chuncheon FC | Chuncheon | Chuncheon Stadium | (South Korea) Kim Yong-ho |
| Gimpo Citizen | Gimpo | Gimpo City Stadium | (South Korea) Yoo Jong-wan |
| Goyang Citizen | Goyang | Goyang Eoulimnuri ground | (South Korea) Kim Jin-ok |
| Gwangju Gwangsan | Gwangju | Honam University ground | (South Korea) Kim Kang-seon |
| Gyeongju Citizen | Gyeongju | Gyeongju Civic Stadium | (South Korea) Kim Jin-hyung |
| Hwaseong FC | Hwaseong | Hwaseong Stadium | (South Korea) Kim Jong-boo |
| Icheon Citizen | Icheon | Icheon City Stadium | (South Korea) Lee Hyun-chang |
| Jeonbuk Maeil | Jeonju | Jeonju University ground | (South Korea) Yang Young-cheol |
| Jungnang Chorus Mustang | Seoul | Jungnang Public Ground | (South Korea) Yoo Bong-ki |
| Paju Citizen | Paju | Paju Public Stadium | (South Korea) Oh Won-jae |
| FC Pocheon | Pocheon | Pocheon Stadium | (South Korea) In Chang-soo |
| Seoul FC Martyrs | Seoul | Gangbuk Stadium | (South Korea) Kim Yong-hae |
| Seoul United | Seoul | Madeul Stadium | (South Korea) Kim Chang-kyum |
| Yangju Citizen | Yangju | Yangju Stadium | (South Korea) Lee Seung-hee |
| Yeonggwang FC | Yeonggwang | Yeonggwang Sportium | (South Korea) Kim Han-bong |
| FC Uijeongbu | Uijeongbu | Uijeongbu Stadium | (South Korea) Kim Hee-tae |

== Regular season ==
=== Group A ===
| Pos | Team | Pld | W | D | L | GF | GA | GD | Pts | Qualification |
|---|---|---|---|---|---|---|---|---|---|---|
| 1 | FC Pocheon | 25 | 21 | 3 | 1 | 68 | 23 | +45 | 66 | Qualification for the playoffs |
| 2 | Icheon Citizen | 25 | 17 | 3 | 5 | 70 | 32 | +38 | 54 | Qualification for the playoffs |
| 3 | Jungnang Chorus Mustang | 25 | 14 | 6 | 5 | 53 | 28 | +25 | 48 | Qualification for the playoffs |
| 4 | Chungbuk Cheongju | 25 | 12 | 6 | 7 | 60 | 38 | +22 | 42 | |
| 5 | Gyeongju Citizen | 25 | 12 | 2 | 11 | 51 | 36 | +15 | 38 | |
| 6 | Yeonggwang FC | 25 | 8 | 5 | 12 | 31 | 37 | −6 | 29 | |
| 7 | Seoul United | 25 | 6 | 4 | 15 | 28 | 52 | −24 | 22 | |
| 8 | Goyang Citizen | 25 | 3 | 3 | 19 | 29 | 60 | −31 | 12 | |
| 9 | Seoul FC Martyrs | 25 | 1 | 0 | 24 | 23 | 167 | −144 | 3 | |

Source: JoinKFA (in Korean)
Rules for classification: 1) Points; 2) Goal difference; 3) Goals scored.

=== Group B ===
| Pos | Team | Pld | W | D | L | GF | GA | GD | Pts | Qualification |
|---|---|---|---|---|---|---|---|---|---|---|
| 1 | Hwaseong FC | 25 | 19 | 2 | 4 | 64 | 27 | +37 | 59 | Qualification for the playoffs |
| 2 | Paju Citizen | 25 | 13 | 8 | 4 | 45 | 23 | +22 | 47 | Qualification for the playoffs |
| 3 | Chuncheon FC | 25 | 11 | 9 | 5 | 49 | 29 | +20 | 42 | Qualification for the playoffs |
| 4 | Jeonju FC | 25 | 10 | 7 | 8 | 49 | 33 | +16 | 37 | |
| 5 | Yangju Citizen | 25 | 10 | 5 | 10 | 43 | 46 | −3 | 35 | |
| 6 | FC Uijeongbu | 25 | 8 | 6 | 11 | 49 | 50 | −1 | 30 | |
| 7 | Gwangju Gwangsan | 25 | 6 | 7 | 12 | 38 | 40 | −2 | 25 | |
| 8 | Gimpo Citizen (Note: Gimpo Citizen was deducted 9 points.) | 25 | 9 | 2 | 14 | 53 | 51 | +2 | 20 | |
| 9 | Cheonan FC | 25 | 4 | 4 | 17 | 19 | 50 | −31 | 16 | |

Source: JoinKFA (in Korean)
Rules for classification: 1) Points; 2) Goal difference; 3) Goals scored.

=== Overall table ===
| Pos | Team | Pld | W | D | L | GF | GA | GD | Pts | Qualification |
|---|---|---|---|---|---|---|---|---|---|---|
| 1 | FC Pocheon | 25 | 21 | 3 | 1 | 68 | 23 | +45 | 66 | Qualification for the playoffs final |
| 2 | Hwaseong FC | 25 | 19 | 2 | 4 | 64 | 27 | +37 | 59 | Qualification for the playoffs semi-final |
| 3 | Icheon Citizen | 25 | 17 | 3 | 5 | 70 | 32 | +38 | 54 | Qualification for the playoffs first round |
| 4 | Jungnang Chorus Mustang | 25 | 14 | 6 | 5 | 53 | 28 | +25 | 48 | Qualification for the playoffs first round |
| 5 | Paju Citizen | 25 | 13 | 8 | 4 | 45 | 23 | +22 | 47 | Qualification for the playoffs first round |
| 6 | Chuncheon FC | 25 | 11 | 9 | 5 | 49 | 29 | +20 | 42 | Qualification for the playoffs first round |

Source: Soccerway
Rules for classification: 1) Points; 2) Goal difference; 3) Goals scored.

== Championship playoffs ==
=== Bracket ===
First round
3 | Icheon Citizen | 3
6 | Chuncheon FC | 1
4 | Jungnang Chorus Mustang | 1
5 | Paju Citizen (a.e.t.) | 2

Second round
Icheon Citizen | 2
Paju Citizen | 1

Semifinal
2 | Hwaseong FC (p) | 1 (11)
Icheon Citizen | 1 (10)

Final
1 | FC Pocheon | 1
Hwaseong FC | 3

=== First round ===
8 November 2014

| Icheon Citizen | 3–1 | Chuncheon FC |

Icheon Sport Complex, Icheon

8 November 2014

| Jungnang Chorus Mustang | 1–2 (a.e.t.) | Paju Citizen |

Paju Public Stadium, Paju

=== Second round ===
15 November 2014

| Icheon Citizen | 2–1 | Paju Citizen |

Icheon Sport Complex, Icheon

=== Semi-final ===
22 November 2014

| Hwaseong FC | 1–1 (a.e.t.) | Icheon Citizen |
Penalties
| | 11–10 |

Hwaseong Stadium, Hwaseong

=== Final ===
29 November 2014

| FC Pocheon | 1–3 | Hwaseong FC |

Pocheon Stadium, Pocheon

== See also ==
- 2014 in South Korean football
- 2014 Korean FA Cup
