= Cho Hyang-gi =

South Korean footballer (born 1992)

Personal information
- Full name: Cho Hyang-gi
- Date of birth: 23 March 1992 (age 34)
- Place of birth: Daejeon, South Korea
- Height: 1.88 m (6 ft 2 in)
- Position: Centre-back

Youth career
- 2008–2010: Jaehyun High School
- 2011–2014: Kwangwoon University

Senior career*
Years	Team	Apps	(Gls)
2015–2021	Seoul E-Land	31	(2)
2018	→ Changwon City (loan)	22	(0)
2019	→ Pocheon Citizen (loan)	20	(3)
2021–2022	Gimpo FC	41	(6)
2023–2024	Gyeongnam FC	14	(3)
- * Club domestic league appearances and goals as of 13:43, 8 February 2025 (UTC)

- Cho Hyang-gi
- Hangul: 조향기
- Hanja: 趙香氣
- RR: Jo Hyanggi
- MR: Cho Hyanggi

Cho Hyang-gi (Korean: 조향기; born 23 March 1992) is a South Korean footballer who plays as a centre-back for Gyeongnam FC.

== Career ==
=== Kwangwoon University ===
Cho Hyang-gi began his career at the Gwacheon Elementary School. He kept his role as a striker until graduating Jaehyun High School. He changed his role to a centre-back after entering the Kwangwoon University's association football team.

=== Seoul E-Land FC ===
He joined Seoul E-Land FC in 2015. He changed his role to a striker by then. He began to self-train as a centre-back again, preparing for the 2017 K League Challenge season. He returned to the club for the 2021 season but left the club during the mid of the season by mutual consent.

=== Gimpo FC ===
Hyang-gi joined Gimpo FC of K3 League after leaving Seoul E-Land FC.

He has returned to K League 2 as the club joined the league for the 2022 season.
