= Yoon Bo-sang =

South Korean footballer

Personal information
- Date of birth: 9 September 1993 (age 33)
- Place of birth: South Korea
- Height: 1.85 m (6 ft 1 in)
- Position: Goalkeeper

Team information
- Current team: Gimpo FC
- Number: 21

Youth career
- 2013–2015: University of Ulsan

Senior career*
Years	Team	Apps	(Gls)
2016–2019	Gwangju FC	55	(0)
2018–2019	→ Sangju Sangmu (army)	44	(0)
2020	Jeju United	1	(0)
2021	Gwangju FC	22	(0)
2022–2024	Seoul E-Land FC	50	(0)
2025–	Gimpo FC	21	(0)
- * Club domestic league appearances and goals as of 6 August 2026

Yoon Bo-sang (Korean: 윤보상; born 9 September 1993) is a South Korean footballer who plays as goalkeeper for Gimpo FC in K League 2.

== Career ==
Yoon Bo-sang joined K League Classic side Gwangju FC in January 2016.

In the 2022 season, he was traded with Kim Kyeong-min and joined Seoul E-Land FC.
