= Han Jong-woo =

South Korean footballer (born 1986)

Han Jong-Woo
Personal information
- Full name: Han Jong-Woo
- Date of birth: 17 March 1986 (age 40)
- Place of birth: South Korea
- Height: 1.84 m (6 ft 1/2 in)
- Position: Midfielder

Youth career
- Sangji University

Senior career*
Years	Team	Apps	(Gls)
2007–2008	Suwon City	9	(0)
2009	Jeonbuk Hyundai Motors	0	(0)
2010	Yongin City	15	(2)
2011	Mokpo City	11	(0)
2012–2014	Bucheon FC 1995	33	(2)
2015	Pocheon Citizen FC		
2016–2021	Gimpo Citizen FC		
- * Club domestic league appearances and goals as of 19 March 2022

Han Jong-Woo (Korean: 한종우; born 17 March 1986) is a South Korean retired footballer who played as midfielder.

== Career ==
He was selected by Jeonbuk Hyundai Motors in 2009 K-League Draft. But he made no appearance in the Motors.

He joined Challengers League side Bucheon FC 1995 in 2012.

In 2015, as the contract with Bucheon FC 1995 was over, he joined Pocheon Citizen FC.

In 2016, he joined Gimpo Citizen FC. He retired at the end of 2021.
