= Kim Kyeong-min =

South Korean footballer (born 1991)

Kim Kyeong-Min
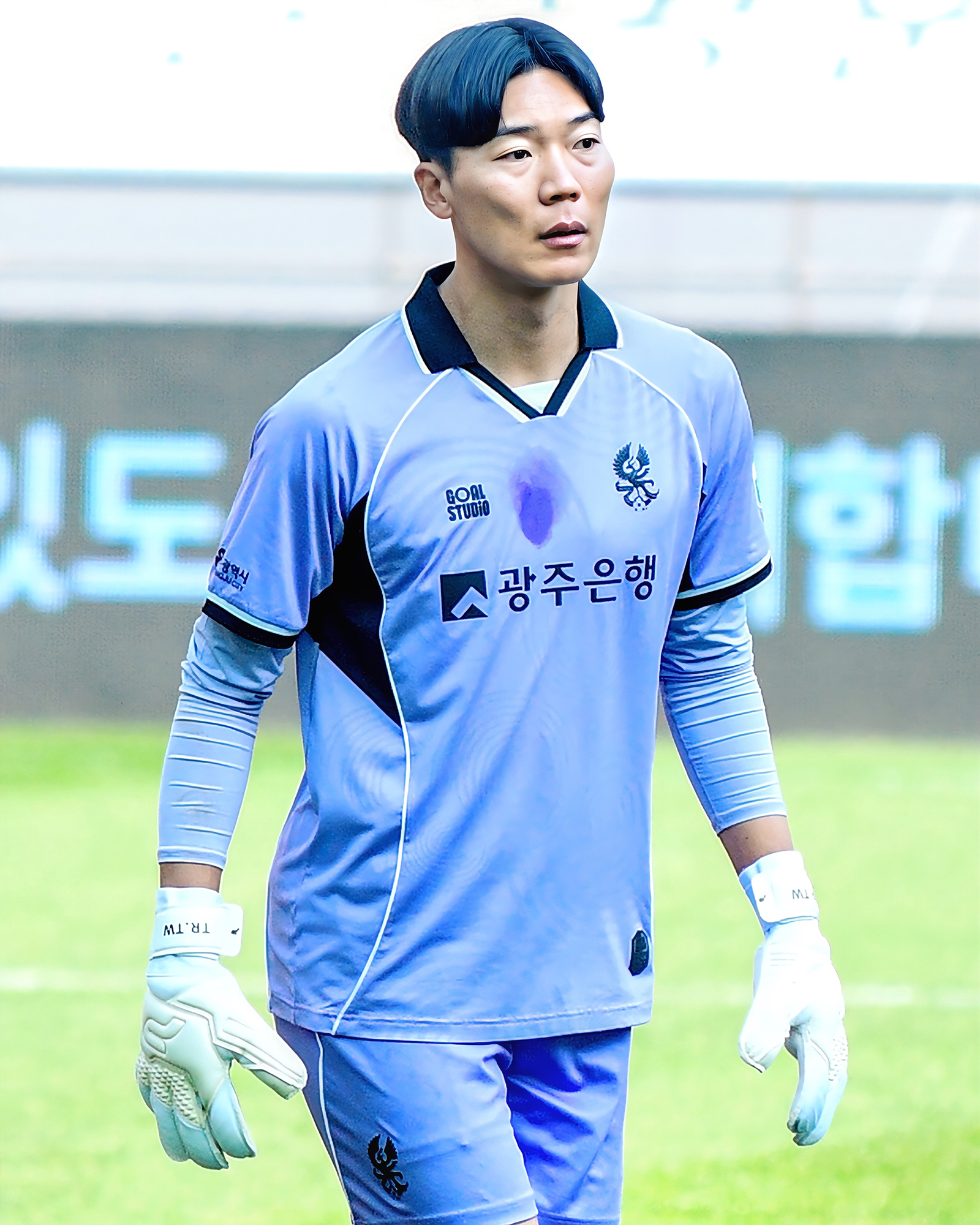
- Kim in 2026

Personal information
- Full name: Kim Kyeong-Min
- Date of birth: 1 November 1991 (age 35)
- Place of birth: Yeosu, South Korea
- Height: 1.90 m (6 ft 3 in)
- Position: Goalkeeper

Team information
- Current team: Gwangju FC
- Number: 1

Youth career
- 2003: Yeosu Mipyeong Elementary School
- 2004–2006: Yeosu Gubong Middle School
- 2007–2009: Hanyang Technical High School

College career
Years	Team	Apps	(Gls)
2010–2013	Hanyang University		

Senior career*
Years	Team	Apps	(Gls)
2014–2020	Jeju United	21	(0)
2017	→ Busan IPark (loan)	14	(0)
2019–2020	→ Pocheon Citizen (draft)	25	(0)
2021	Seoul E-Land	34	(0)
2022–	Gwangju FC	143	(0)

International career
2009–2011	South Korea U20	8	(0)
2011	South Korea Universiade	2	(0)
2012	South Korea U23	2	(0)
- * Club domestic league appearances and goals as of 4 August 2026

Kim Kyeong-Min (Korean: 김경민; born 1 November 1991) is a South Korean professional footballer who plays as a goalkeeper for K League 1 club Gwangju FC.

== Career ==
Kim made several appearances for the South Korea U-20 and U-23 teams between 2009 and 2012. He made his professional club debut for Jeju United in a 1-0 victory over Ulsan Hyundai on 16 August 2014. He joined Busan IPark on loan on 18 January 2017.

In 2021, season, he joined Seoul E-Land FC was nominated as a vice captain.

In 2022, he was traded with Yoon Bo-sang and moved to Gwangju FC.

In 2023, Became the main goalkeeper and scored 22 runs in 26 games, marking his best season with Gwangju FC's first advance to the ACL. He was nominated for the best goalkeeper, but unfortunately failed to win the individual award, losing to Cho Hyun-woo.

== Style of play ==
Due to coach Lee Jung-hyo's tactics, the goalkeeper should act like a field player. When he catches the ball, he plays on-ball like a defender, exchanging short passes with defenders. Therefore, it is classified as a goalkeeper with good foot skills, such as a quick save even if he makes a mistake, although it is a big risk.

== Career statistics ==
As of 6 December 2025

Appearances and goals by club, season and competition
Club	Season	League			Cup		Continental		Other		Total	
Club	Season	Division	Apps	Goals	Apps	Goals	Apps	Goals	Apps	Goals	Apps	Goals
Jeju United	2014	K League 1	2	0	1	0	—		—		3	0
Jeju United	2015	K League 1	7	0	1	0	—		—		8	0
Jeju United	2016	K League 1	10	0	0	0	—		—		10	0
Jeju United	2018	K League 1	2	0	1	0	1 (Note: Appearances in AFC Champions League Elite)	0	—		4	0
Jeju United	Total		21	0	3	0	1	0	—		25	0
Busan IPark (loan)	2017	K League 2	14	0	1	0	—		—		15	0
Pocheon Citizen (draft)	2019	K3 League	19	0	0	0	—		—		19	0
Pocheon Citizen (draft)	2020	K4 League	6	0	0	0	—		—		6	0
Pocheon Citizen (draft)	Total		25	0	0	0	—		—		25	0
Seoul E-Land	2021	K League 2	34	0	0	0	—		—		34	0
Gwangju FC	2022	K League 2	34	0	0	0	—		—		34	0
Gwangju FC	2023	K League 1	26	0	0	0	—		—		26	0
Gwangju FC	2024	K League 1	36	0	1	0	6	0	—		43	0
Gwangju FC	2025	K League 1	33	0	4	0	5	0	—		42	0
Gwangju FC	Total		129	0	5	0	11	0	—		145	0
Career total			223	0	9	0	12	0	0	0	244	0

== Honours ==
Gwangju FC

- K League 2: 2022
