= Lee In-jae (footballer, born 1992) =

South Korean footballer

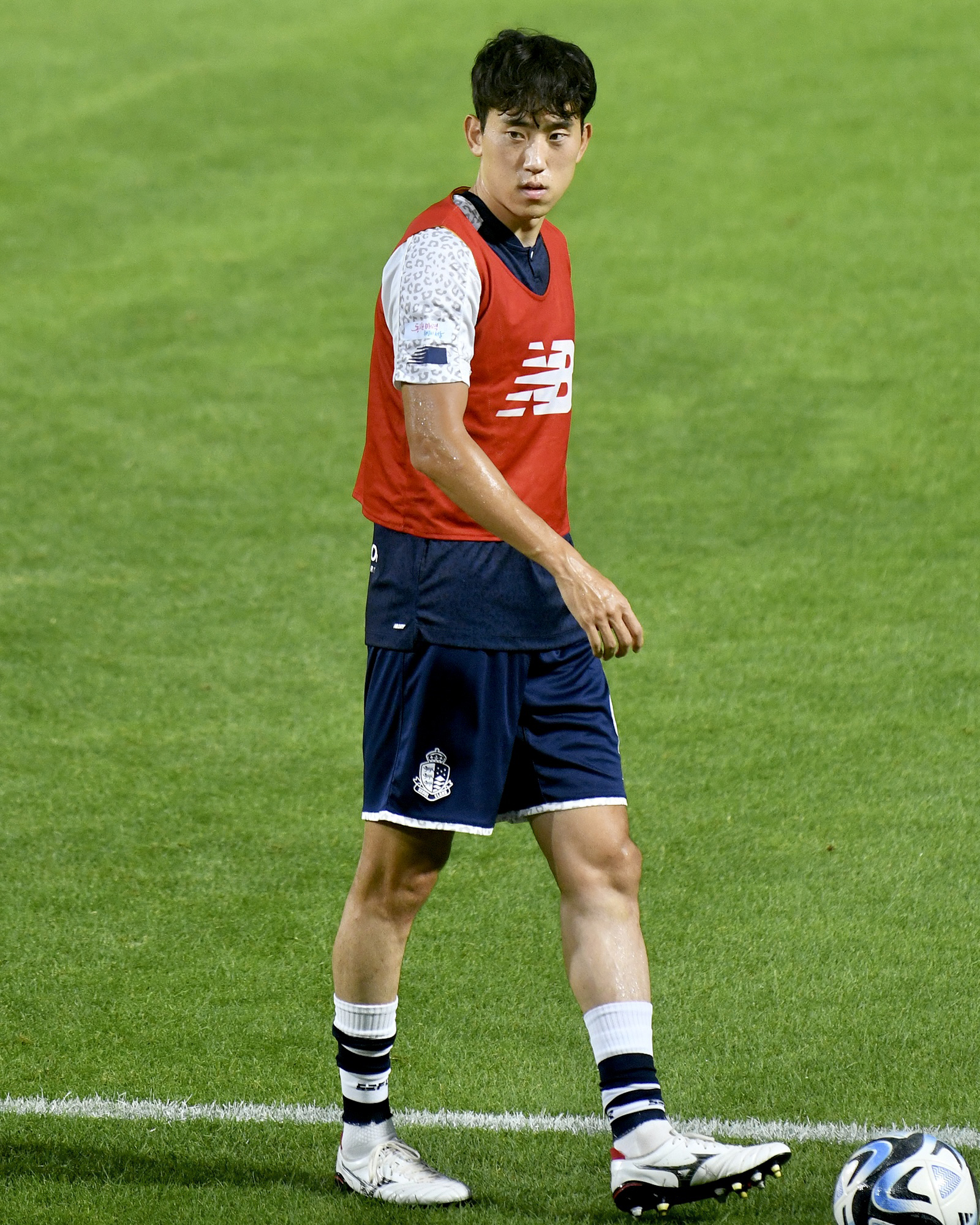
- Lee in 2023

Personal information
- Full name: Lee In-jae
- Date of birth: 13 May 1992 (age 34)
- Place of birth: South Korea
- Height: 1.87 m (6 ft 1 1/2 in)
- Position: Defender

Team information
- Current team: Gimpo FC
- Number: 4

Youth career
- 2011–2014: Dankook University

Senior career*
Years	Team	Apps	(Gls)
2015–2016	Ulsan Hyundai Mipo	33	(5)
2017–2020	Ansan Greeners	102	(5)
2020–2024	Seoul E-Land FC	78	(1)
2025–	Gimpo FC	1	(0)
- * Club domestic league appearances and goals as of 7 January 2026

Lee In-jae (Korean: 이인재; born 13 May 1992) is a South Korean footballer who plays as defender for Gimpo FC.

== Career ==
Lee joined K League 2 side Ansan Greeners before 2017 season starts.

He joined Seoul E-Land FC in 2020.
