= Park Kyung-min =

Park Kyung-min may refer to:

- Park Kyung-min (footballer, born 1990)
- Park Kyung-min (footballer, born 1999)
