= Park Jun-hyuk =

South Korean footballer

Park Jun-Hyuk

Personal information
- Full name: Park Jun-Hyuk
- Date of birth: 11 April 1987 (age 39)
- Place of birth: Seoul, South Korea
- Height: 1.85 m (6 ft 1 in)
- Position: Goalkeeper

Team information
- Current team: Cheonan City FC

Youth career
- 2006–2009: Jeonju University

Senior career*
Years	Team	Apps	(Gls)
2010	Gyeongnam FC	0	(0)
2011–2012	Daegu FC	57	(0)
2013	Jeju United	31	(0)
2014–2015	Seongnam FC	67	(0)
2016	Seongnam FC	3	(0)
2017	FC Pocheon		
2018	Daejeon Citizen	18	(0)
2019–2021	Jeonnam Dragons	70	(0)
2022–	Cheonan City FC		

International career
2008	Korea Republic Beach Soccer		
- * Club domestic league appearances and goals as of 22 February 2022

- Park Jun-hyuk
- Hangul: 박준혁
- Hanja: 朴俊赫
- RR: Bak Junhyeok
- MR: Pak Chunhyŏk

Park Jun-Hyuk (Korean: 박준혁; born 11 April 1987) is a South Korean footballer who plays as a goalkeeper who plays for Cheonan City FC.

== Club career ==
Park started his career at Gyeongnam FC, being one of the club's picks from the 2010 K-League Draft. Unused by Gyeongnam FC during the 2010 K-League season, Park joined Daegu FC in February 2011 on a free transfer. On 16 March 2011, Park made his professional debut in a 0 – 2 League Cup loss to his former club, Gyeongnam FC.

He started his military duty in December 2015. However, on 16 July 2016, due to his personal issues, he returned to Seongnam FC and his duty was replaced as a supplementary service.

In 2017, he joined Pocheon Citizen FC of K3 League Advanced as a social service agent and contributed the club to earn the championship of the league and was awarded as the best goalkeeper of 2017 K3 League Advanced.

In January 2018, Jun-hyuk left Pocheon Citizen FC and terminated the contract with Seongnam FC. In July, he joined Daejeon Citizen of K League 2 for half of the year.

In 2019, he joined Jeonnam Dragons. He had contributed the club to the championship of 2021 Korean FA Cup. However, on 4 January 2022, he left the club as the contract was over.

On 22 February 2022, Jun-hyuk joined Cheonan City FC of K3 League.

== Club career statistics ==
As of 27 January 2022

Club performance			League		Cup		League Cup		Total	
Season	Club	League	Apps	Goals	Apps	Goals	Apps	Goals	Apps	Goals
South Korea			League		KFA Cup		League Cup		Total	
2010	Gyeongnam FC	K-League	0	0	0	0	0	0	0	0
2011	Daegu FC	K-League	24	0	0	0	4	0	23	0
2012	Daegu FC	K-League	38	0	1	0	-		39	0
2013	Jeju United FC	K League 1	31	0	0	0	0	0	0	0
2014	Seongnam FC	K League 1	35	0	0	0	0	0	0	0
2015	Seongnam FC	K League 1	32	0	0	0	0	0	0	0
2016	Seongnam FC	K League 1	3	0	0	0	0	0	0	0
2017	FC Pocheon	K3 League Advanced	?	?	?	?	?	?	?	?
2018	Daejeon Citizen	K League 2	18	0	0	0	0	0	0	0
2019	Jeonnam Dragons	K League 2	31	0	0	0	0	0	0	0
2020	Jeonnam Dragons	K League 2	24	0	0	0	0	0	0	0
2021	Jeonnam Dragons	K League 2	15	0	0	0	0	0	0	0
Career total			219	0	1	0	4	0	224	0
