= Kim Min-kyu (footballer, born 1998) =

South Korean footballer (born 1998)

Personal information
- Date of birth: 1 April 1998 (age 28)
- Place of birth: South Korea
- Height: 1.88 m (6 ft 2 in)
- Position: Defender

Team information
- Current team: Gimcheon Sangmu (on loan from Seoul E-Land)

Youth career
- –2010: Seongnam Jungang Elementary School
- 2011–2017: Seongnam

Senior career*
Years	Team	Apps	(Gls)
2017	Seongnam FC	2	(0)
2018	Hwaseong FC		
2019	Gimhae FC	7	(0)
2020–	Seoul E-Land	96	(0)
2025–	Gimcheon Sangmu (loan)	9	(0)
- * Club domestic league appearances and goals as of 4 August 2026

- Kim Min-kyu
- Hangul: 김민규
- RR: Gim Mingyu
- MR: Kim Min'gyu

Kim Min-kyu (Korean: 김민규; born 1 April 1998) is a South Korean footballer currently playing as a defender for Seoul E-Land.

== Career statistics ==
=== Club ===
As of 12 March 2022.

Club	Season	League			Cup		Other		Total	
Club	Season	Division	Apps	Goals	Apps	Goals	Apps	Goals	Apps	Goals
Seongnam	2017	K League Challenge	2	0	1 (Note: Appearances in the Korean FA Cup)	0	0	0	3	0
Hwaseong	2018	K3 League Advanced	–		1	0	0	0	1	0
Gimhae	2019	Korea National League	7	0	1	0	2 (Note: Appearances in the KNL Cup)	0	10	0
Seoul E-Land	2020	K League 2	2	0	1	0	0	0	3	0
Seoul E-Land	2021	K League 2	2	0	1	0	0	0	3	0
Seoul E-Land	2022	K League 2	0	0	1	0	0	0	1	0
Seoul E-Land	Total		4	0	3	0	0	0	7	0
Career total			13	0	6	0	2	0	21	0
