= Paju Frontier FC =

South Korean football club

Paju Frontier
- Full name: Paju Frontier Football Club 파주 프런티어 FC
- Founded: 16 February 2012; 14 years ago as Paju Citizen
- Ground: Paju Stadium
- Capacity: 23,000
- Chairman: Kim Kyung-il (Mayor of Paju)
- Manager: Gerard Nus
- League: K League 2
- 2025: K3 League, 10th of 15
- Website: http://fc.pajusports.co.kr/

Paju Frontier FC (Korean: 파주 프런티어 FC), formerly Paju Citizen Football Club (Korean: 파주 시민 축구단) is a South Korean professional football club based in the city of Paju. The club was founded in 2012 and plays in K League 2, the second tier of men's football in South Korea.

== History ==
=== Amateur years (2012-2019) ===
The club was founded in February 2012 as Paju Citizen FC and played its first match in the third tier Challengers League the following month. In its inaugural season, Paju Citizen progressed to the Challengers League championship semi-final. The following year, the club beat Hwaseong FC in the semi-final but lost in the final to defending champions Pocheon Citizen to finish as runners-up.

In 2017, when the league was restructured, the club participated in the K3 League Advanced. Paju finished in 11th place and was relegated to the 2018 K3 League Basic, where it finished in second place to earn promotion back to the K3 League Advanced the following year. The 2019 season saw Paju Citizen compete in the final iteration of the K3 League Advanced before the league system underwent another restructuring ahead of the 2020 season.

=== Semi-professional era (2020-2025) ===
With the establishment of the new semi-professional K3 League and K4 League system, Paju joined the K4 League in 2020. They earned promotion to the 2021 K3 League as the inaugural K4 champions. Paju were runners-up in K3 in 2022.

=== Professional era (2026-) ===
In August 2025, the K League board of directors approved Paju's membership, paving the way for the club to become fully professional and join K League 2 from the 2026 season. In October 2025, it was announced that Gerard Nus would manage Paju FC from 2026, marking his return to South Korea after 14 years elsewhere. The following month, Paju Citizen officially changed its name to Paju Frontier as part of a rebranding exercise in anticipation of its first season in the second division. On 16 January 2026, Paju Frontier received final approval membership from the K League, confirming its participation in the 2026 K League 2.

== Colours and crest ==
The previous club crest also featured a pigeon

On 24 November 2025, Paju Frontier revealed a new crest, featuring 20 cosmos representing the 20 administrative districts of Paju, and a pigeon, the official representative animal of the city.

The club's colours are 'Frontier Blue' and 'Cosmos Pink'.

== Stadium ==
Paju's home ground is Paju Stadium, a multi-purpose bowl stadium that seats 20,000. The club's training ground is the Paju National Football Center, previously the training ground of the South Korea national football team.

== Current squad ==
As of 25 October 2026.

Note: Flags indicate national team as defined under FIFA eligibility rules; some limited exceptions apply. Players may hold more than one non-FIFA nationality.

No.	Pos.	Nation	Player
1	GK	KOR	Ryu Won-woo (vice-captain)
2	DF	KOR	Kim Min-sung
4	DF	KOR	Kim Hyun-tae
5	DF	KOR	Sim Min-yong
6	DF	KOR	Cheon Hyeon-byung (vice-captain)
7	MF	BRA	Walterson
8	MF	KOR	Choi Bum-kyung
9	FW	CUW	Jafar Arias
10	MF	KOR	Lee Joon-suk
11	MF	KOR	Choi Won-rok
13	GK	KOR	Kim Min-seung
14	MF	KOR	Seo Dong-han
16	FW	KOR	Lee Dae-kwang
17	MF	KOR	Park Su-been
18	FW	KOR	Lee Je-ho
19	MF	KOR	Yu Jae-jun
20	DF	KOR	Hong Jeong-un (captain)

No.	Pos.	Nation	Player
21	GK	KOR	Hwang Jun-mo
22	DF	KOR	Lee Min-ki
23	FW	KOR	Sung Jin-young
26	DF	KOR	Lee Yeon-gyu
27	MF	PAR	Julio Báez
33	DF	COL	Julián Bonilla
34	DF	KOR	Roh Seung-ik
40	MF	ENG	Luke Amos
45	DF	KOR	Seo Jung-hyun
47	MF	KOR	Choi Sang-yoon
55	DF	KOR	Jang Ha-yun
70	MF	KOR	Ahn June-hyuk
88	DF	KOR	Lee Taek-geun
91	GK	KOR	Yeom Gyung-min
92	FW	ESP	Borja Bastón
97	DF	KOR	Jeon Yu-sang
99	FW	KOR	Lee Dong-yeol

=== Out on loan ===
Note: Flags indicate national team as defined under FIFA eligibility rules; some limited exceptions apply. Players may hold more than one non-FIFA nationality.

No.	Pos.	Nation	Player
—	MF	KOR	Lee Chan-ho (at Vizela)

== Backroom staff ==
=== Coaching staff ===
- Manager: (Spain) Gerard Nus
- Assistant manager: (Spain) Ramon Ferrer
- Goalkeeping coach: (South Korea) Kim Beom-soo
- Coach: (Spain) Jay Son
- Physical coach: (Spain) Sergio Carlos

== Managerial history ==
- Joo Deok-jeung (2012)
- Oh Won-jae (2013)
- Kim Chul (2014–2015)
- Jeon Jeong-seon (2015–2017)
- Jeon Seong-hoon (2018)
- Lee Eun-no (2019–2023)
- Oh Beom-seok (2024)
- Lee Eun-no (2025)
- Gerard Nus (2026–)

== Honours ==
- K3 League
  - Runner-up (1): 2022
- K4 League
  - Winner (1): 2020
- Challengers League / K3 League
  - Winner (0):
  - Runner-up (1): 2013
  - Third place (1): 2012
- K3 League Basic
  - Runner-up (1): 2018

== Season-by-season records ==
Season	Teams	Tier	League	Placement	Pld	W	D	L	GF	GA	GD	Pts	League Cup	FA Cup	Manager
2012	18	3	K3 Challengers League	Semifinal	25	15	5	5	61	34	+27	50	-	DNQ	(South Korea) Cho Deok-jeung
2013	18	4	K3 Challengers League	Runner-up↑	16	1	4	2	38	14	+24	34	-	Second Round	(South Korea) Oh Won-Jae
2014	18	4	K3 Challengers League	Playoff	25	13	8	4	45	23	+22	47	-	First Round	(South Korea) Oh Won-Jae
2015	18	4	K3 League	Playoff	25	15	4	6	56	22	+34	48.5	-	Second Round	(South Korea) Oh Won-Jae
2016	20	4	K3 League	7th	19	10	4	5	47	24	+23	34	-	Third Round	(South Korea) Oh Won-Jae
2017	12	4	K3 Advanced	11th	22	6	6	10	22	31	-9	24	-	Third Round	(South Korea) Oh Won-Jae
2018	11	5	K3 Basic	2nd	20	14	1	4	40	10	+30	43	-	Third Round	(South Korea) Jeong Seong-hoon
2019	12	4	K3 Advanced	6th	22	11	2	9	30	26	+4	35	-	Round of 16	(South Korea) Oh Won-jae
2020	13	4	K4 League	Winners↑	24	16	5	3	42	27	+15	53	None	Second Round	(South Korea) Oh Won-jae
2021	15	3	K3 League	10th	28	8	11	9	32	36	-4	35	None	Second Round	(South Korea) Oh Won-jae
2022	16	3	K3 League	2nd	30	15	11	4	43	29	+14	56	None	Second Round	(South Korea) Oh Won-jae
2023	15	3	K3 League	7th	28	11	5	12	32	27	+5	38	None	Round of 16	(South Korea) Oh Won-jae
2024	16	3	K3 League	8th	30	11	9	10	30	30	0	42	None	Second Round	(South Korea) Oh Beom-seok
2025	15	3	K3 League	10th ↑	28	10	6	12	27	32	-5	36	None	Second Round	(South Korea) Lee Eun-no
