= Kim Do-kyun =

South Korean footballer (born 1977)

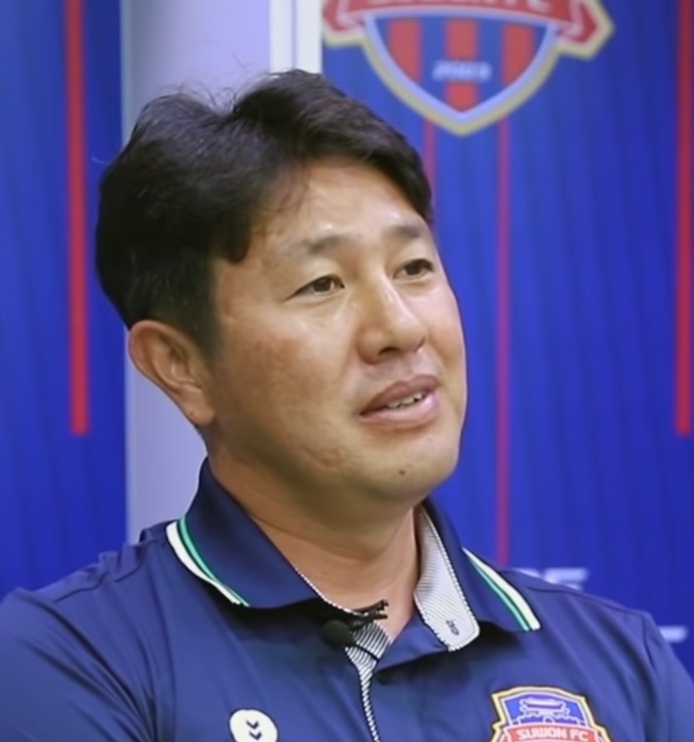

Personal information
- Date of birth: 13 January 1977 (age 49)
- Place of birth: Yeongdeok, Gyeongbuk, South Korea
- Height: 1.84 m (6 ft 0 in)
- Position: Midfielder

Team information
- Current team: Seoul E-Land (manager)

College career
Years	Team	Apps	(Gls)
1996–1998	University of Ulsan		

Senior career*
Years	Team	Apps	(Gls)
1999–2003	Ulsan Hyundai Horang-i	82	(2)
2004	Kyoto Purple Sanga	17	(0)
2005	Seongnam Ilhwa Chunma	1	(0)
2005–2006	Jeonnam Dragons	17	(0)
Total		117	(2)

International career
1997	South Korea U20	8	(2)
1999–2000	South Korea U23	28 (Note: Includes three appearances against non-national teams.)	(2)
1999–2000	South Korea	10	(0)

Managerial career
- 2014–2016: Ulsan Hyundai
- 2020–2023: Suwon FC
- 2024–: Seoul E-Land
Medal record
Men's football
Representing South Korea
AFC Youth Championship
Gold medal – first place	1996 South Korea	Team
- * Club domestic league appearances and goals

- Kim Do-kyun
- Hangul: 김도균
- Hanja: 金徒均
- RR: Gim Dogyun
- MR: Kim Togyun

Kim Do-kyun (born 13 January 1977) is a South Korean football manager and former player. He is the current manager of K League 2 club Seoul E-Land.

== International career ==
Kim played for South Korea in 1997 FIFA World Youth Championship, 2000 Summer Olympics and 2000 CONCACAF Gold Cup. He was one of the most notable young talents in South Korea, and was in the spotlight as the Most Valuable Player of 1996 AFC Youth Championship and 1999 Dunhill Cup Vietnam.

== Career statistics ==
=== Club ===
Appearances and goals by club, season and competition
Club	Season	League			National cup		League cup		Continental		Total	
Club	Season	Division	Apps	Goals	Apps	Goals	Apps	Goals	Apps	Goals	Apps	Goals
Ulsan Hyundai Horang-i	1999	K League	6	0	?	?	5	0	—		11	0
Ulsan Hyundai Horang-i	2000	K League	12	1	?	?	2	0	—		14	1
Ulsan Hyundai Horang-i	2001	K League	22	1	?	?	5	0	—		27	1
Ulsan Hyundai Horang-i	2002	K League	8	0	?	?	10	1	—		18	1
Ulsan Hyundai Horang-i	2003	K League	34	0	0	0	—		—		34	0
Ulsan Hyundai Horang-i	Total		82	2	?	?	22	1	—		104	3
Kyoto Purple Sanga	2004	J2 League	17	0	?	?	—		—		17	0
Seongnam Ilhwa Chunma	2005	K League	1	0	0	0	6	0	—		7	0
Jeonnam Dragons	2005	K League	10	0	1	0	0	0	—		11	0
Jeonnam Dragons	2006	K League	7	0	0	0	0	0	—		7	0
Jeonnam Dragons	Total		17	0	1	0	0	0	—		18	0
Career total			117	2	1	0	28	1	—		146	3

== Honours ==
=== Player ===
Ulsan Hyundai Horang-i

- Korean League Cup runner-up: 2002

Jeonnam Dragons

- Korean FA Cup: 2006

South Korea U20

- AFC Youth Championship: 1996

Individual

- AFC Youth Championship Most Valuable Player: 1996
- AFC Asian All-Star: 1999
- K League All-Star: 2000, 2001

=== Manager ===
Individual

- K League Manager of the Month: June 2022

== Notes ==
Sporting positions
Preceded by Yoo Sang-soo	Jeonnam Dragons captain 2005	Succeeded by Kim Hyo-il
