= Aleksandar Vojnović =

Bosnian footballer (born 1996)

Personal information
- Date of birth: 3 October 1996 (age 30)
- Place of birth: Novi Grad, Bosnia and Herzegovina
- Height: 1.90 m (6 ft 3 in)
- Position: Centre back

Team information
- Current team: Hwaseong
- Number: 15

Senior career*
Years	Team	Apps	(Gls)
2015–2016	Sloboda Novi Grad	28	(3)
2016–2018	Rudar Prijedor	59	(8)
2018–2020	Zvijezda 09	48	(0)
2020–2023	Borac Banja Luka	92	(3)
2023–2025	Radnički Niš	64	(3)
2025–	Hwaseong	51	(1)

International career^{‡}
2021	Bosnia and Herzegovina	1	(0)
- * Club domestic league appearances and goals as of 5 August 2026 ‡ National team caps and goals as of 30 August 2023

Aleksandar Vojnović (born 3 October 1996) is a Bosnian professional footballer who plays as a defender for Hwaseong.

== Club career ==
Born in Novi Grad, Vojnović played with FK Sloboda Novi Grad and FK Rudar Prijedor in the First League of Republika Srpska, before playing with FK Zvijezda 09 and FK Borac Banja Luka in the premier League of Bosnia and Herzegovina. After spending 5 seasons in Bosnian top tier, and, became national team player, he signed with Serbian SuperLiga side FK Radnički Niš.

== International career ==
He made his debut for the Bosnia and Herzegovina national team in a friendly match against the United States on 18 December 2021.

== Honours ==
Borac Banja Luka

- Premier League of Bosnia and Herzegovina: 2020–21
