= Kim Han-bin =

South Korean footballer (born 1991)

Personal information
- Full name: Kim Han-bin
- Date of birth: 31 March 1991 (age 35)
- Place of birth: South Korea
- Height: 1.73 m (5 ft 8 in)
- Position: Defender

Team information
- Current team: Pocheon Citizen FC
- Number: 42

Youth career
- 2010–2013: Sunmoon University

Senior career*
Years	Team	Apps	(Gls)
2014–2016	Chungju Hummel	62	(1)
2017–2018	Bucheon FC	27	(1)
2018–	Incheon United	0	(0)
2019	→ Bucheon FC (loan)	12	(1)
2022-	Pocheon Citizen FC	16	(1)
- * Club domestic league appearances and goals as of 22 October 2022

Kim Han-bin (Korean: 김한빈; born 31 March 1991) is a South Korean footballer who plays as defender for Pocheon Citizen FC in K3 League.

== Career ==
He was selected by Chungju Hummel in 2014 K League draft.
