= Son Jeong-hyeon =

South Korean footballer

Personal information
- Date of birth: 25 November 1991 (age 34)
- Place of birth: Geoje, South Korea
- Height: 1.92 m (6 ft 3 1/2 in)
- Position: Goalkeeper

Team information
- Current team: Gimpo FC
- Number: 31

Youth career
- 2010–2013: Gwangju University

Senior career*
Years	Team	Apps	(Gls)
2014–2023	Gyeongnam FC	136	(0)
2016–2017	→ Asan Mugunghwa (army)	12	(0)
2024–	Gimpo FC	72	(0)
- * Club domestic league appearances and goals as of 6 August 2026

Son Jeong-hyeon (Korean: 손정현; born 25 November 1991) is a South Korean footballer who plays as goalkeeper for Gimpo FC.

== Career ==
Lee was selected by Gyeongnam FC in the 2014 K League draft.
