= Lee Hak-min =

South Korean footballer

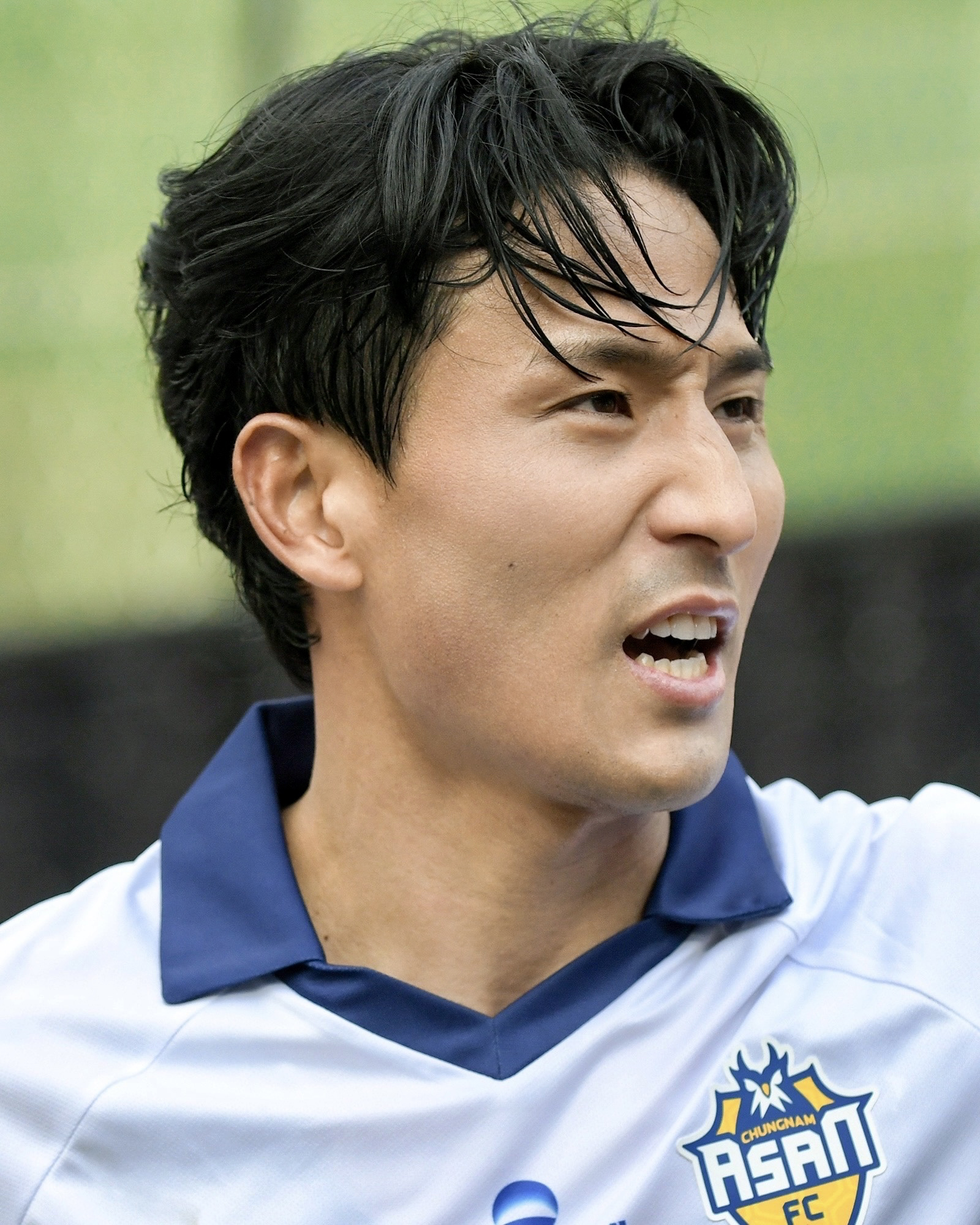
- Lee in 2024

Personal information
- Date of birth: 11 March 1991 (age 35)
- Place of birth: South Korea
- Height: 1.75 m (5 ft 9 in)
- Position: Full back

Team information
- Current team: Gimpo FC
- Number: 14

Youth career
- 2010–2013: Sangji University

Senior career*
Years	Team	Apps	(Gls)
2014	Gyeongnam FC	19	(1)
2015–2016	Bucheon FC	73	(4)
2017	Incheon United	7	(0)
2017–2018	Seongnam FC	33	(0)
2019	Suwon FC	22	(0)
2022-2025	Chungnam Asan FC	114	(9)
2026-	Gimpo FC	17	(0)
- * Club domestic league appearances and goals as of 5 August 2026

Lee Hak-min (Korean: 이학민; born 11 March 1991) is a South Korean footballer who plays as full back for Gimpo FC in K League 2.

== Career ==
He was selected by Gyeongnam FC in the 2014 K League draft and made his debut goal on 13 July 2014 in the league match against Jeonbuk.
