= Park Kyung-min (footballer, born 1999) =

Korean association football player

Personal information
- Date of birth: 2 August 1999 (age 27)
- Place of birth: South Korea
- Height: 1.74 m (5 ft 9 in)
- Position: Defender

Team information
- Current team: Hwaseong FC
- Number: 17

Senior career*
Years	Team	Apps	(Gls)
2019–2021	Busan IPark	4	(0)
2021-2023	Seoul E-Land FC	9	(0)
2024-2025	Jinju Citizen FC	43	(0)
2026-	Hwaseong FC	12	(1)

International career^{‡}
2019	South Korea U20		
Medal record
Men's football
Representing South Korea
FIFA U-20 World Cup
Runner-up	2019 Poland
- * Club domestic league appearances and goals as of 5 August 2026 ‡ National team caps and goals as of 20 February 2021

Park Kyung-min (Korean: 박경민; born 2 August 1999) is a South Korean footballer currently playing as a defender for Hwaseong FC.

== Career statistics ==
=== Club ===
As of 31 December 2023.

Club	Season	League			Cup		Other		Total	
Club	Season	Division	Apps	Goals	Apps	Goals	Apps	Goals	Apps	Goals
Busan IPark	2019	K League 2	4	0	0	0	0	0	4	0
Busan IPark	2020	K League 1	0	0	2	0	0	0	2	0
Seoul E-Land FC	2021	K League 2	0	0	0	0	0	0	0	0
Seoul E-Land FC	2022	K League 2	2	0	0	0	0	0	2	0
Seoul E-Land FC	2023	K League 2	7	0	0	0	0	0	1	0
Career total			13	0	2	0	0	0	15	0
