= Ju Seung-jin =

South Korean association football player

Joo Seung-Jin 주승진
Personal information
- Full name: Joo Seung-Jin
- Date of birth: March 12, 1975 (age 51)
- Place of birth: South Korea
- Height: 1.77 m (5 ft 10 in)
- Position: Defender

Senior career*
Years	Team	Apps	(Gls)
2003–2007	Daejeon Citizen	151	(3)
2008–2009	Busan I'Park	11	(0)

Managerial career
- 2010–2018: Suwon Bluewings (youth)
- 2018: Suwon Bluewings (youth director)
- 2019: Suwon Samsung Bluewings (chief coach)
- 2020: Suwon Samsung Bluewings (assistant coach)
- 2020: Suwon Samsung Bluewings (caretaker)
- 2020–2022: Suwon Bluewings (youth director)
- 2023: Suwon Samsung Bluewings (assistant coach)
- 2024: Hwaseong FC
- * Club domestic league appearances and goals

Joo Seung-Jin (born March 12, 1975) is a South Korean former professional football player who mainly played as a defender. He played mainly as a side attacker on the right side but has also played in many different positions such as either defending or attacking midfielder. Joo SeungJin made more than 160 Football League appearances in South Korea, most prominently for Daejeon Citizen and Busan I'Park (formerly Daejeon Citizen).

In terms of his coaching history, he began to coach at U-15 Suwon Samsung Bluewings as an assistant coach. After two years, he took the position as a head coach at U-15 Suwon Samsung Bluewings for three years and another three years as a head coach at U-18 Suwon Samsung Bluewings. During the time when he was a head coach of U-18, he was appointed as a director of whole youth academy at Suwon Samsung Bluewings. He is the last manager of Hwaseong FC.

== Into coaching ==
As shown above, he took his first steps into coaching with professional football youth team called "Suwon Samsung Bluewings" U-15 as a coach from 2010–2011. After two years with his enthusiasm into coaching, he progressed as the Head coach of U-15, leading them into the K-League Junior Champions for three years from 2012–2015. With these excellent results Suwon Samsung Bluewings promoted him into the Head coach of U-18 in 2016. No doubt that he also made amazing results, lifting U-18 three K-League Junior Champions for three years from 2016–2018. In 2018, he was appointed First Head of Whole Suwon Samsung Bluewings Youth Academy.

== Managerial statistics ==
As of match played 22 July 2026

Managerial record by team and tenure
Team	Nat.	From	To	Record					Ref.
Team	Nat.	From	To	G	W	D	L	Win %	Ref.
Suwon Samsung Bluewings (caretaker)	(South Korea)	16 July 2020	8 September 2020	9	2	1	6	22.22	
Hwaseong	(South Korea)	14 December 2023	5 December 2024	32	17	8	7	53.13	
Gimcheon Sangmu	(South Korea)	1 January 2026	Present	19	2	11	6	10.53	
Career Total				60	21	20	19	35.00	

== Honours ==
=== Managerial ===
Suwon Samsung Bluewings

- 2012 National Spring Football Confederation U-15 wins
- 2012-2014 Oryonggi tournament U-15 win three consecutive years
- 2014 National King's Cup U-15 wins
- 2015 National Championship U-15 wins
- 2015 National Spring Manchester United Cup U-15 wins
- 2016 The second half of the U-18 National King of K-League Junior wins
- 2017 National Football Confederation U-18 wins
- 2017 K-League Junior U-18 win in the first half
- 2017 The King of K-League Junior First Half U-18 wins
- 2017,18 K-League Junior Championship U-17 wins
- 2018 National Spring Football Confederation U-18 wins
- 2018 k-League Pre and Post Championship wins
