= Park Jung-soo (footballer) =

South Korean footballer

Park Jung-Soo
Personal information
- Full name: Park Jung-Soo
- Date of birth: 13 January 1987 (age 39)
- Place of birth: South Korea
- Height: 1.81 m (5 ft 11 1/2 in)
- Position: Central midfielder

Youth career
- 2005–2008: Sangji University

Senior career*
| Years | Team | Apps | (Gls) |
| 2009 | Daejeon KHNP | 20 | (0) |
| 2010 | Sagan Tosu | 14 | (0) |
| 2011 | Busan Transportation Corp. | 12 | (0) |
| 2012–2013 | Fujian Smart Hero | 56 | (0) |
| 2014–2015 | Chainat Hornbill | 45 | (4) |
| 2015–2016 | Goyang Hi FC | 15 | (2) |
| 2017 | Pocheon Citizen FC | | |
| 2018 | Gangwon FC | 25 | (1) |
| 2019–2021 | Gwangju FC | 54 | (1) |
- * Club domestic league appearances and goals as of 9 January 2022

- Park Jung-soo
- Hangul: 박정수
- Hanja: 朴庭秀
- RR: Bak Jeongsu
- MR: Pak Chŏngsu

Park Jung-Soo (Korean: 박정수; born 13 January 1987) is a South Korean footballer who plays for Gwangju FC as a midfielder.

Park started his senior career at Daejeon KHNP of Korea National League in 2009, where he stayed until December 2009.

In 2010, he joined Japanese club Sagan Tosu, and made his Sagan Tosu debut on 12 September 2010 against Ventforet Kofu.

After the 2010-11 season he moved to Busan Transportation Corporation FC.

He then transferred to the Chinese club Fujian Smart Hero in March 2012 and subsequently played for a number of other clubs before joining Gwangju FC in 2019.
