= Hwaseong FC =

Association football club in South Korea

- Full name: Hwaseong Football Club 화성에프씨
- Founded: 23 January 2013; 13 years ago
- Ground: Hwaseong Stadium
- Capacity: 35,265
- Owner: Hwaseong City
- Chairman: Jeong Myeong-geun (Mayor of Hwaseong)
- Manager: Cha Du-ri
- League: K League 2
- 2025: K League 2, 10th of 14
- Website: www.hwaseongfc.com
Home colours	Away colours

Hwaseong FC (Korean: 화성 FC) is a South Korean professional football club based in Hwaseong, Gyeonggi Province. They play in K League 2, the second tier of South Korean football's domestic league system.

Founded in 2013, the club is owned by Hwaseong City and play their home games at Hwaseong Stadium.

== History ==
In September 2012, Hwaseong City formed a committee to promote the establishment of Hwaseong FC. In January 2013, the team received approval from the Korea Football Association to participate in the amateur fourth-tier Challengers League (later renamed as K3 League). The club was officially founded on 23 January 2013 as a semi-professional club.

In their first season, Hwaseong FC immediately finished first in the Challengers League – Group B and advanced to the final stages, but failed to advance to the championship finals after being eliminated by Paju Citizen, finishing the season in third place overall. However, in the 2014 season, Hwaseong won their first title after defeating Pocheon Citizen 3–1 in the Challengers League championship play-off final, held in Pocheon in front of about 4,000 spectators.

Five years later, in 2019, Hwaseong, under head coach Kim Hak-chul, won their second K3 League title after defeating Yangpyeong FC 1–0 in the final. In the same season, Hwaseong became the first fourth-division team to reach the semi-finals of the Korean FA Cup. In the first semi-final match, Hwaseong managed to upset four-time Korean champions Suwon Samsung Bluewings with a 1–0 win, but lost the second leg 3–0 after extra time and were eliminated 3–1 on aggregate. They won another K3 League title in 2023, before finishing as runners-up in their final semi-professional season the following year.

Hwaseong FC turned professional in December 2024, joining the second-tier K League 2. Former South Korean international Cha Du-ri was appointed head coach for the team's first professional season.

== Colours and crest ==
The previous club crest included the Hwaseong City mascot.

Hwaseong FC's main colour is orange, which is also the colour that symbolizes the city of Hwaseong. The current club crest, in use since 2023 to celebrate the club's tenth anniversary, features the English initials of Hwaseong City, 'H' and 'S', placed in the centre. The pillars on each side represent the administrative districts of Hwaseong City. In the bottom centre, there is a forest path and a pine, the official tree of Hwaseong. The V-shape denotes both the Yellow Sea, which forms the maritime boundaries of Hwaseong, and 'Victory', which symbolizes endless possibilities like the wide sea.

The club's previous crest, used from 2013 to 2022, featured the emblem of Hwaseong City, along with one of the city mascots, Coriyo (also spelled as Koriyo).

== Stadium ==
Hwaseong FC play their home games at Hwaseong Stadium, located within the Hwaseong Sports Complex Town. Between 2013 and 2022, they played on the stadium's auxiliary field, and since 2023, they have played at the 35,265-capacity main stadium.

== Current squad ==
As of 6 August 2026

Note: Flags indicate national team as defined under FIFA eligibility rules; some limited exceptions apply. Players may hold more than one non-FIFA nationality.

No.	Pos.	Nation	Player
1	GK	KOR	Kim Seung-geon (vice-captain)
2	DF	KOR	Lim Chan-yeol
4	DF	KOR	Jang Min-jun (vice-captain)
5	DF	KOR	Yang Si-hoo
6	MF	KOR	Kim Jung-min (vice-captain)
7	FW	KOR	Jegal Jae-min
8	MF	KOR	Jeon Seong-jin (vice-captain)
9	FW	SRB	Sava Petrov
10	FW	BRA	Demethryus
11	FW	KOS	Leonard Pllana
13	MF	KOR	Park Jae-sung
14	FW	KOR	Kim Byung-oh
15	DF	BIH	Aleksandar Vojnović
16	MF	KOR	Choi Myung-hee
17	DF	KOR	Park Kyung-min
18	GK	KOR	Kim Ki-hun
20	DF	KOR	Park Jun-seo
21	GK	KOR	Kim Tae-jun

No.	Pos.	Nation	Player
22	DF	KOR	Kim Dae-hwan
23	DF	KOR	Kim Je-yul
24	DF	KOR	Choi Ye-hoon (on loan from Busan IPark)
27	MF	KOR	Kim Woo-jin
28	MF	KOR	Park Jin-woo
29	FW	KOR	Son Seung-beom (on loan from Pohang Steelers)
31	GK	KOR	An Gwang-mun
38	GK	KOR	Park Eui-jeong
44	DF	KOR	Ham Sun-woo (on loan from FC Seoul)
47	MF	KOR	Hwang Kun-sung
66	DF	KOR	Jung Yong-hee
77	FW	KOR	Lee Ji-han
79	FW	KOR	Lim Byeong-hun
90	FW	RUS	Stanislav Iljutcenko
92	MF	KOR	Lee Jong-sung (captain)
97	FW	KOR	Lee Rae-jun
99	FW	KOR	Kim Bum-hwan (on loan from Ulsan HD)

=== Out on loan ===
Note: Flags indicate national team as defined under FIFA eligibility rules; some limited exceptions apply. Players may hold more than one non-FIFA nationality.

No.	Pos.	Nation	Player
—	DF	KOR	Cho Dong-jae (at Busan IPark)
—	MF	KOR	Baek Seung-woo (at Geumsan Insam for military service)

No.	Pos.	Nation	Player
—	FW	KOR	Oh Chang-hwan (at Siheung Citizen)

== Managerial history ==
- Kim Jong-boo (2013–2015)
- Lee Do-yong (2016)
- Kim Sung-nam (2017–2018)
- Kim Hak-chul (2019–2021)
- Kang Chul (2022–2023)
- Ju Seung-jin (2024)
- Cha Du-ri (2025–present)

== Honours ==
- K3 League
  - Winners (3): 2014, 2019, 2023
  - Runners-up (1): 2024

== Season-by-season records ==
Season	Teams	League	Position	Pld	W	D	L	GF	GA	GD	Pts	Playoffs	Korean Cup
2013	18	K3 Challengers League	1st (Group B)	25	16	5	4	86	21	+65	53	Semi-final	Did not participate
2014	18	K3 Challengers League	1st (Group B)	25	19	2	4	64	27	+37	59	Champions	Second round
2015	18	K3 League	2nd (Group B)	25	18	2	5	65	36	+29	56	Quarter-final	Round of 16
2016	20	K3 League	9th	19	9	4	6	37	26	+11	31	Did not qualify	Third round
2017	12	K3 Advanced	3rd	22	9	8	5	30	26	+4	35	Semi-final	Third round
2018	12	K3 Advanced	7th	22	9	6	7	32	25	+7	33	Did not qualify	Third round
2019	12	K3 Advanced	1st	22	16	2	4	44	19	+25	50	Champions	Semi-final
2020	16	K3 League	6th	22	9	6	7	29	27	+2	33	Did not qualify	Third round
2021	15	K3 League	12th	28	8	10	10	29	34	–5	34	Did not qualify	Second round
2022	16	K3 League	6th	30	12	10	8	33	29	+4	46	—N/a	Third round
2023	15	K3 League	1st	28	17	9	2	42	21	+21	60	—N/a	Second round
2024	16	K3 League	2nd	30	16	8	6	56	32	+24	56	—N/a	Third round
2025	14	K League 2	10th	39	9	13	17	36	50	–14	40	Did not qualify	Third round

== See also ==
- Football in South Korea
- List of football clubs in South Korea
