= Ahn June-hyuk =

South Korean footballer (born 1999)

Personal information
- Date of birth: 30 July 1999 (age 27)
- Place of birth: Namyangju, South Korea
- Height: 1.73 m (5 ft 8 in)
- Position: Winger

Youth career
- Seoul Daedong Elementary School
- 2012: Boin Middle School
- 2012–2017: Roda
- 2017–2018: Villarreal

Senior career*
Years	Team	Apps	(Gls)
2018–2019	Villarreal C	44	(11)
2019–2022	Villarreal B	60	(3)
2023	Unionistas	7	(0)
2023–2024	Teruel	24	(0)

International career
2018	South Korea U19	3	(0)
- * Club domestic league appearances and goals as of 18 May 2024

Ahn June-hyuk (Korean: 안준혁; born 30 July 1999) is a South Korean footballer who plays as a winger.

== Career ==
As a youth player, Ahn joined the youth academy of Spanish club Villarreal, being initially assigned to affiliate club Roda. He joined the Juvenil squad of Villarreal in 2017, before being promoted to the C-team in the following year.
