= Kim Jong-hyun (footballer) =

South Korean footballer

Kim-Jong-hyun
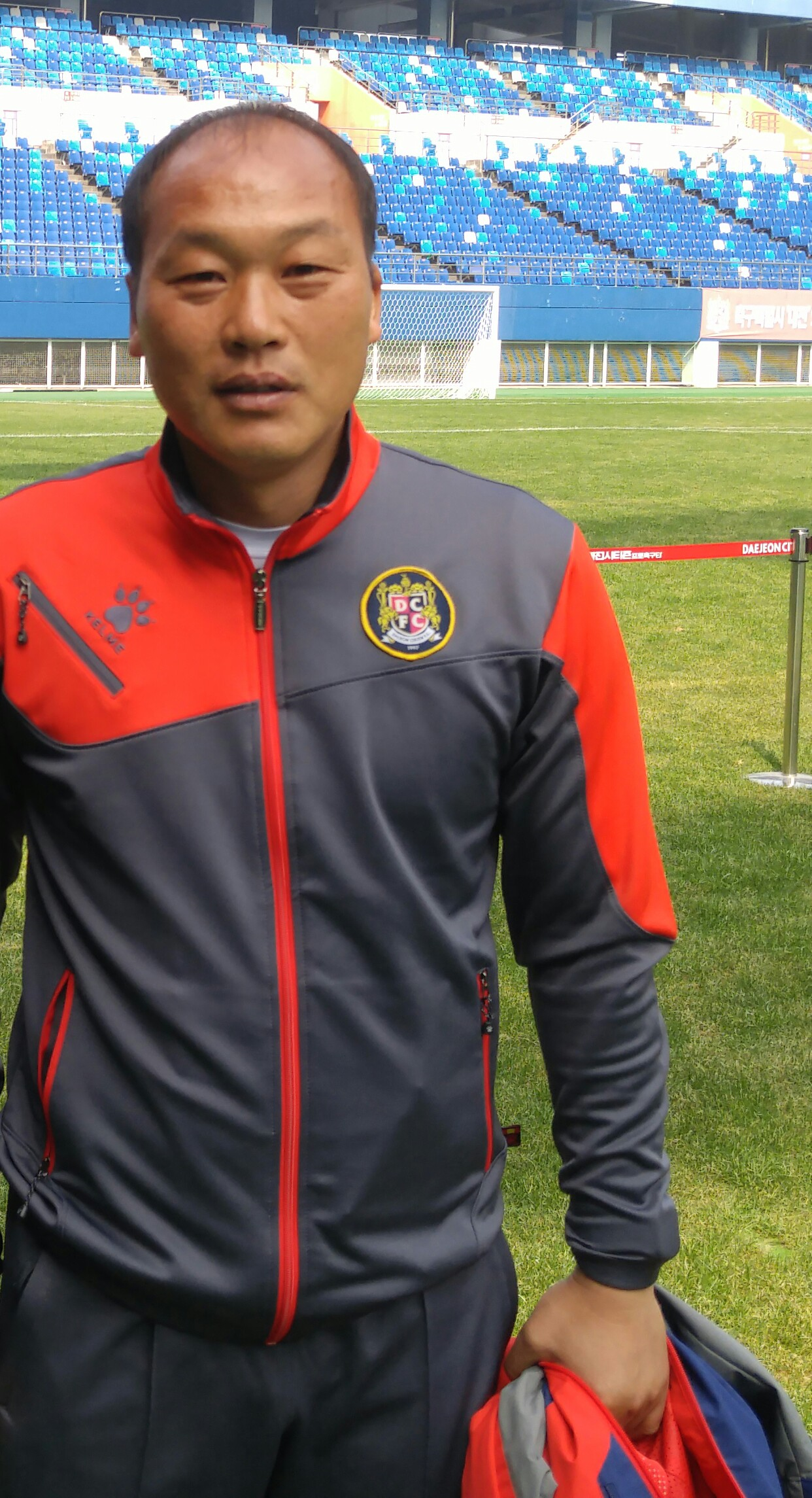

Personal information
- Full name: Kim-Jong-hyun
- Date of birth: July 10, 1973 (age 53)
- Place of birth: South Korea Danyang County
- Height: 1.73 m (5 ft 8 in)
- Position: Forward

Youth career
- Chungbuk National University

Senior career*
Years	Team	Apps	(Gls)
1995–1997	Kookmin Bank		
1998–2002	Jeonnam Dragons	140	(15)
1993–2005	Daejeon Citizen	99	(15)
2006–2009	Goyang KB Kookmin Bank FC	34	(1)
2009–2010	Cheongju FC		

Managerial career
- 2008: Goyang KB Kookmin Bank FC (Playing Coach)
- 2009–2010: Cheongju FC (Playing Coach)
- 2009–2014: Cheongju FC (Youth Coach)
- 2010–2013: Cheongju FC
- 2016–2017: Daejeon Citizen (Coach)
- 2017–: Daejeon Citizen (Caretaker)
- * Club domestic league appearances and goals

Kim-Jong-hyun is a South Korean former player and current caretaker of Daejeon Citizen.
