= Paju Stadium =

Sports venue in Paju, South Korea

- Interactive map of Paju Stadium
- Location: Paju, South Korea
- Coordinates: 37.756085°N 126.786476°E
- Owner: City of Paju
- Operator: Paju Urban Corporation
- Capacity: 23,000
- Surface: Natural grass
- Field size: 105 by 68 metres (115 by 74 yards)

Construction
- Groundbreaking: 1994
- Opened: 2004

Tenant
- Paju Frontier (2012–present)

Paju Stadium is a multi-use stadium in Paju, South Korea. It is currently used mostly for football matches. The stadium opened in 2001 and holds 23,000 people. It is the home ground of K League 2 club Paju Frontier.
