= Gimpo FC =

South Korean football club

- Full name: Gimpo Football Club
- Founded: 2013; 13 years ago (as Gimpo Citizen FC)
- Ground: Gimpo Solteo Football Field
- Capacity: 10,037
- Owner: Jung Ha-young
- Chairman: Seo Young-gil
- Manager: Ko Jeong-woon
- League: K League 2
- 2025: K League 2, 7th of 14
- Website: https://www.gimpofc.com/

Gimpo Football Club (Korean: 김포시민프로축구단), formerly Gimpo Citizen FC, is a South Korean professional football club based in the city of Gimpo. Since 2022, the club have played in the K League 2, the second tier of league football in South Korea.

== History ==
=== Gimpo Citizen FC (2013–2020) ===
The club was founded as Gimpo Citizen FC in 2013. Between 2015 and 2019, they advanced to the K3 League play-offs for five consecutive seasons, but never made it to the finals.

=== Gimpo FC (2021–present) ===
In order to meet the standards for incorporation of the newly reorganized K3 League, the Gimpo FC foundation was established, and the team was also renamed as Gimpo FC in January 2021. The club participated in the semi-professional K3 League until 2021. In their final K3 League season, Gimpo FC finished as runners-up in the regular season, and won the play-offs by defeating Cheonan City 3–2 on aggregate in the final, clinching their first K3 League trophy.

After the 2021 season, the club became professional and received approval to become a member of the professional K League 2 from the 2022 season onwards.

== Current squad ==
As of 16 November 2026

Note: Flags indicate national team as defined under FIFA eligibility rules; some limited exceptions apply. Players may hold more than one non-FIFA nationality.

No.	Pos.	Nation	Player
1	GK	KOR	Lee Sang-min
2	DF	KOR	Choi Seon-kyu
3	DF	KOR	Park Kyung-rok
4	DF	KOR	Kim Tae-han (vice-captain)
5	DF	KOR	Lee Chan-hyeong
6	MF	KOR	Choi Jae-young
7	MF	KOR	Kim Do-hyuk (captain)
8	MF	BRA	Djalma
10	MF	BRA	Luan Dias
11	MF	KOR	Lee Si-heon
13	DF	KOR	Park Sang-hyoun
14	DF	KOR	Lee Hak-min
15	DF	KOR	Lee In-jae
16	MF	KOR	Kim Sung-joon
17	DF	KOR	Lim Chang-seok
18	FW	KOR	Kim Jun-seo
19	DF	KOR	Hong Tae-hyung

No.	Pos.	Nation	Player
20	FW	KOR	Kim Min-seok
21	GK	KOR	Yoon Bo-sang
22	FW	KOR	Yoon Jae-woon
23	DF	KOR	Kim Min-sik
26	DF	KOR	Choi Jong-woon
31	GK	KOR	Son Jeong-hyeon
32	DF	KOR	Jang Bu-seong
33	FW	IRQ	Amar Muhsin
40	FW	KOR	Nam Hyun-woo
44	DF	KOR	Lee Yong-hyeok
47	DF	KOR	Kim Dong-min
50	FW	KOR	Park Dong-jin
66	DF	KOR	Park Byung-hyun
70	FW	KOR	Choi Sung-beom (on loan from FC Anyang)
77	DF	AUS	Connor Chapman
96	FW	BRA	Paulo Henrique
—	MF	KOR	Kim Joon-hyung

=== Out on loan ===
Note: Flags indicate national team as defined under FIFA eligibility rules; some limited exceptions apply. Players may hold more than one non-FIFA nationality.

No.	Pos.	Nation	Player
—	MF	KOR	Choi Jae-hoon (at Geoje Citizen for military service)
—	MF	KOR	Yeon Eung-bin (at Ansan Greeners)
—	FW	KOR	Ahn Chang-min (at Cheonan City)

No.	Pos.	Nation	Player
—	FW	KOR	Cheon Ji-hyeon (at Jinju Citizen for military service)
—	FW	KOR	Kim Young-jun (at Geoje Citizen for military service)

== Honours ==
- K3 League
  - Champions: 2021

== Season-by-season record ==
Season	Teams	Tier	League	Placement	Postseason	Pld	W	D	L	GF	GA	GD	Pts	Korean Cup	Manager
K3 League (amateur)
2014	18	4	K3 Challengers League	8th in Group B	Did not qualify	25	9	2	14	53	51	+2	29	First round	An Jong-goan; Kim Seung-ki
2015	18	4	K3 League	2nd	Semi-final	25	17	5	3	81	22	+59	56	Fourth round	Kim Seung-ki
2016	20	4	K3 League	2nd	Quarter-final	19	16	1	2	46	14	+32	49	Second round	Kim Seung-ki
2017	12	4	K3 Advanced	5th	Quarter-final	22	9	6	7	28	26	+2	33	Third round	Kim Seung-ki
2018	12	4	K3 Advanced	4th	Quarter-final	22	11	4	7	42	31	+11	37	Fourth round	Oh Jong-yeol
2019	12	4	K3 Advanced	3rd	Quarter-final	22	12	6	4	28	19	+9	42	Fourth round	Oh Jong-yeol
K3 League (semi-professional)
2020	16	3	K3 League	8th	Did not qualify	22	6	8	8	27	27	0	26	Third round	Ko Jeong-woon
2021	15	3	K3 League	2nd	Champions	28	14	10	4	35	20	+15	52	Second round	Ko Jeong-woon
K League (professional)
2022	11	2	K League 2	8th	Did not qualify	40	10	11	19	39	65	–26	41	Third round	Ko Jeong-woon
2023	13	2	K League 2	3rd	Promotion-relegation playoffs (lost to Gangwon FC)	36	16	12	8	40	25	+15	60	Round of 16	Ko Jeong-woon
2024	13	2	K League 2	7th	Did not qualify	36	14	12	10	43	41	+2	54	Quarter-final	Ko Jeong-woon
2025	14	2	K League 2	7th	Did not qualify	39	14	13	12	48	37	+11	55	Quarter-final	Ko Jeong-woon
