= Gimcheon Sangmu FC =

Association football club in South Korea

Gimcheon Sangmu
- Full name: Gimcheon Sangmu Football Club 김천 상무 프로축구단
- Founded: 1984; 42 years ago (as Sangmu FC); 2021; 5 years ago (as Gimcheon Sangmu FC)
- Dissolved: 2026; 0 years ago (as Gimcheon Sangmu FC)
- Ground: Gimcheon Stadium
- Capacity: 25,000
- Owner(s): Gimcheon Government and Korea Armed Forces Athletic Corps
- Chairman: Mayor of Gimcheon
- Manager: Ju Seung-jin
- League: K League 1 K League 2
- 2025: K League 1, 3rd of 12 (To be relegated after 2026)
- Website: gimcheonfc.com
Home colours	Away colours

Gimcheon Sangmu Football Club (Korean: 김천 상무 프로축구단; Hanja: 金泉 尚武 프로蹴球團) is a South Korean professional football club based in Gimcheon that competes in the K League 1, the top tier of the South Korean football's league system. Sangmu is the sports division of the Republic of Korea Armed Forces.

Sangmu's playing staff is made up of young South Korean professional footballers serving their compulsory two-year military duty. Fifteen players join up at the start of every season and spend two years with the side before returning to their previous professional clubs. Due to its military affiliation, Sangmu are not allowed to sign any foreign players nor are they eligible for Asian competitions.

This article also includes the predecessor military-based teams – Sangmu FC, Gwangju Sangmu FC and Sangju Sangmu FC – which are still separate legal entities.

== History ==
=== Various military clubs (1950s–1983) ===
Before the Korea Armed Forces Athletic Corps and its football club Sangmu FC were founded in 1984, the Republic of Korea Armed Forces had three football clubs: ROK Army FC, ROK Marine Corps FC, and ROK Air Force FC.

The ROK Army originally established football clubs of each corps, including CIC FC (Counter Intelligence Corps; also known as Seoul FC or Seoul Club), HID FC (Headquarters of Intelligence Detachment), Quartermaster Corps FC (consisting of only quartermasters), OPMG FC (Office of the Provost Marshal General; former Military Police Command FC), Engineer Corps FC, and Infantry School FC. Most of them (excluding Quartermaster Corps FC) were merged into the Engineer Corps FC in 1965. These two clubs merged in 1969, and Army FC was established.

Afterwards, the Marine Corps FC was renamed as ROK Navy FC due to the dissolution of the Headquarters Marine Corps in 1973.

Until 1955	1956–1964	1965–1968	1969–1972	1973–1983
Military Police Command FC	Army OPMG FC	Army Engineer Corps FC	Army FC	
Army Engineer Corps FC		Army Engineer Corps FC	Army FC	
Army CIC FC		Army Engineer Corps FC	Army FC	
Army HID FC		Army Engineer Corps FC	Army FC	
Army Infantry School FC		Army Engineer Corps FC	Army FC	
Other ROK Army clubs		Army Engineer Corps FC	Army FC	
Army Quartermaster Corps FC			Army FC	
Marine Corps FC				Navy FC
Air Force FC

=== Founding and semi-professional Sangmu FC era (1984–2002) ===
Sangmu FC was founded on 11 January 1984, as the football side of Korea Armed Forces Athletic Corps. Although Sangmu squad was composed of professional players from K League clubs, Sangmu FC competed in the semi-professional league (now Korea National League). Sangmu joined the K League for the 1985 season, but spent only one year in the league before dropping out. In February 1985, the team toured Pakistan, Burma and Sri Lanka, playing against local sides.

The reserve side, Sangmu B, competed in the K2 League from 2003 to 2005 before joining the K League reserve league. Sangmu B was based in Icheon and finished as the runners-up in the 2003 K2 League season.

=== Gwangju Sangmu era (2002–2010) ===
After establishing a home base in Gwangju in April 2002, the team participated in the Reserve League. The club has rejoined the K League at the start of the 2003 season as Gwangju Sangmu Bulsajo FC. Between 2004 and 2010, the club has been known as Gwangju Sangmu FC.

=== Sangju Sangmu era (2011–2020) ===
Once Gwangju FC was established, Gwangju Sangmu FC was relocated to Sangju, North Gyeongsang Province, as Korea Armed Forces Athletic Corps moved to Mungyeong, near Sangju. The club name was officially changed to Sangju Sangmu Phoenix FC in January 2011.

Before the 2013 season, the club officially removed the word "Phoenix" in its name. In the same season, Sangju Sangmu became the first champions of the newly established K League Challenge (second division) and promoted to the K League Classic.

Sangju started the 2020 season already knowing they would be relegated to K League 2. The military club decided to move out of Sangju to a new, as yet undisclosed location. Sangju has decided not to establish a football team which would be citizen-owned outfit and also played in K League 2.

=== Gimcheon Sangmu (2021–2026) ===
On 30 June 2020, the K League administration announced that the city of Gimcheon had officially submitted an application to host the team for at least the 2021 season, offering their local stadium as the football club's new home. After a preliminary review and several meetings and assemblies involving local governors, the K League eventually approved the proposal and began the process of moving the club to Gimcheon.

== Club name history ==
- 1996–2002: Sangmu FC
- 2002–2003: Gwangju Sangmu Bulsajo FC
- 2004–2010: Gwangju Sangmu FC
- 2011–2012: Sangju Sangmu Phoenix FC
- 2013–2020: Sangju Sangmu FC
- 2021–present: Gimcheon Sangmu FC

== Players ==
=== Current squad ===
As of 12 October 2026

Note: Flags indicate national team as defined under FIFA eligibility rules; some limited exceptions apply. Players may hold more than one non-FIFA nationality.

No.	Pos.	Nation	Player
2	DF	KOR	Min Kyeong-hyeon
4	DF	KOR	Kim Hyun-woo
5	DF	KOR	Kim Min-kyu
15	MF	KOR	Lim Dug-keun
21	FW	KOR	Kim In-gyun
33	DF	KOR	Park Jin-seong
41	GK	KOR	Park Man-ho
42	MF	KOR	Hong Si-hoo
43	DF	KOR	Kim Seo-jin
44	DF	KOR	Park Min-seo
45	DF	KOR	Byeon Jun-soo
46	MF	KOR	Chung Ma-ho
47	FW	KOR	Lee Sang-heon
48	FW	KOR	Hong Yun-sang (vice-captain)
49	FW	KOR	Kang Min-geu
50	FW	KOR	Kang Ju-hyeok
51	GK	KOR	An Jun-su
53	MF	KOR	Roh Kyung-ho
54	MF	KOR	Yoon Jae-seok
55	MF	KOR	Park Tae-jun (captain)
56	MF	KOR	Lee Kang-hyun (vice-captain)

No.	Pos.	Nation	Player
57	FW	KOR	Jeong Jae-min
58	FW	KOR	Park Yong-hee
61	GK	KOR	An Chan-gi
62	DF	KOR	Kim Jin-ho
63	DF	KOR	Song Jun-seok
64	DF	KOR	Kang Yeong-hun
65	DF	KOR	Lee Sang-hyeok
66	MF	KOR	Oh Jae-hyeok
67	FW	KOR	Byeon Gyung-jun
68	FW	KOR	Heo Yool
70	FW	KOR	Park Ji-won
71	GK	KOR	Park Sang-young
72	MF	KOR	Choi Kyu-hyun
73	MF	KOR	Kim Jun-ha
75	DF	KOR	Lim Jun-young
77	MF	KOR	Hong Won-jin
—	DF	KOR	Cha Seung-hyeon
—	DF	KOR	Eo Jeong-won
—	DF	KOR	Jang Min-gyu
—	DF	KOR	Seo Myung-gwan

== Backroom staff ==
Position	Staff
Manager	(South Korea) Ju Seung-jin
Head coach	(South Korea) Kim Chi-woo
Assistant coach	(South Korea) Kim Ju-pyo
Goalkeeping coach	(South Korea) Park Ji-hun
Analyst	(South Korea) No Yeon-ho
Training NCO	(South Korea) Yeom Gyeong-seon
Physiotherapists	(South Korea) Kim Young-hyo
Physiotherapists	(South Korea) Ji Sung-jin
Team manager	(South Korea) Han Jae-hee

== Managers ==
Name	From	To
(South Korea) Kim Young-bae	11 January 1984	1984
(South Korea) Jang Jong-dae	1985	9 July 1985
(South Korea) Kim Young-bae	10 July 1985	December 1989
(South Korea) Lee Kang-jo	1990	27 October 2010
(South Korea) Lee Soo-chul	28 October 2010	13 July 2011
(South Korea) Kim Tae-wan (caretaker)	14 July 2011	29 December 2011
(South Korea) Park Hang-seo	20 December 2011	11 December 2015
(South Korea) Cho Jin-ho	18 December 2015	25 November 2016
(South Korea) Kim Tae-wan	25 November 2016	9 December 2022
(South Korea) Sung Han-soo (caretaker)	9 December 2022	25 May 2023
(South Korea) Chung Jung-yong	26 May 2023	24 December 2025
(South Korea) Ju Seung-jin	31 December 2025	

== Honours ==
=== League ===
- K League 2
  - Winners (4): 2013, (Note: As Sangju Sangmu) 2015, 2021, 2023
- National Semi-Professional Football League
  - Winners (9): 1984, 1991 Fall, 1992 Spring, 1994 Spring, 1996 Fall, 1997 Fall, 1998 Fall, 1999 Fall, 2002 Spring
  - Runners-up (5): 1987 Fall, 1993 Spring, 1999 Spring, 2000 Spring, 2003

=== Cups ===
- National Semi-Professional Football Championship
  - Winners (2): 1999, 2001
- National Football Championship
  - Winners (1): 1996

== Season-by-season records ==
=== K League ===
Sangmu all-time records
Season	Teams	P	W	D	L	GF	GA	GD	Pts	Position	Korean FA Cup	League Cup	Top scorer (league goals)
Sangmu era
1985	8	21	6	7	8	23	30	−7	19	6th	None	None	(South Korea) Hong Seok-min (6)
Gwangju Sangmu era
2003	12	44	13	7	24	41	60	−19	46	10th	Round of 16	None	(South Korea) Lee Dong-gook (11)
2004	13	24	6	11	7	18	20	−2	29	8th	Quarter-finals	10th	(South Korea) Park Jung-hwan (4)
2005	13	24	4	5	15	23	38	−15	17	13th	Round of 16	11th	(South Korea) Kim Sang-rok (5)
2006	14	26	5	8	13	17	29	−12	23	14th	Round of 16	11th	(South Korea) Kang Yong (4) (South Korea) Chung Kyung-ho (4)
2007	14	26	2	6	18	14	44	−30	12	14th	Round of 16	Group stage	(South Korea) Namgung Do (7)
2008	14	26	3	7	16	22	46	−24	16	14th	Quarter-finals	Group stage	(South Korea) Kim Myung-joong (7)
2009	15	28	9	3	16	33	40	−7	30	11th	Round of 16	Group stage	(South Korea) Choi Sung-kuk (9)
2010	15	28	3	10	15	17	43	−26	19	14th	Quarter-finals	Group stage	(South Korea) Choi Sung-kuk (4)
Sangju Sangmu era
2011	16	30	7	8	15	36	53	−17	29	14th	Round of 16	Group stage	(South Korea) Kim Jung-woo (15)
2012	16	44	7	6	31	29	74	−45	27	16th	Round of 16	—	

=== K League 1 and K League 2 ===
Sangmu all-time records
Season	Division	Teams	P	W	D	L	GF	GA	GD	Pts	Position	Korean FA Cup
Sangju Sangmu era
2013	K2	8	35	23	8	4	65	31	+34	77	1st	Round of 16
2014	K1	12	38	7	13	18	39	62	−23	34	12th	Semi-finals
2015	K2	11	40	20	7	13	77	57	+20	67	1st	Third round
2016	K1	12	38	12	7	19	54	65	−11	43	6th	Round of 32
2017	K1	12	38	8	11	19	41	66	−25	35	11th	Quarter-finals
2018	K1	12	38	10	10	18	41	52	−11	40	10th	Round of 32
2019	K1	12	38	16	7	15	49	53	−4	55	7th	Semi-finals
2020	K1	12	27	13	5	9	34	36	–2	44	4th	Round of 16
Gimcheon Sangmu era
2021	K2	10	36	20	11	5	60	34	+26	71	1st	Quarter-finals
2022	K1	12	38	8	14	16	45	48	–3	38	11th	Third round
2023	K2	13	36	22	5	9	71	37	+34	71	1st	Third round
2024	K1	12	38	18	9	11	55	41	+14	63	3rd	Round of 16
2025	K1	12	38	18	7	13	59	45	+14	61	3rd	Round of 16

== See also ==
- Boeun Sangmu WFC
- Icheon Sangmu FC
