= In Chang-soo =

South Korean footballer and coach

Personal information
- Date of birth: 23 November 1972
- Place of birth: Seoul, South Korea
- Position: Defender

Senior career*
| Years | Team | Apps | (Gls) |
| 1994–1995 | E-Land Puma | | |

Managerial career
- 2008: Ansan Hallelujah (caretaker)
- 2013–2015: Pocheon Citizen
- 2016: Seoul E-Land (caretaker)
- 2017–2018: Seoul E-Land
- * Club domestic league appearances and goals

In Chang-soo (Korean: 인창수; born 23 November 1972) is a former South Korean footballer and coach. He holds Argentine citizenship.

In was born in South Korea. When he was a child, he emigrated to Argentina. His Argentine name is Diego.

== Club career ==
In Chang-soo played for E-Land Puma during 1994 and 1995.

== Managerial career ==
In 2006, he started his coaching career in Ansan Hallelujah.

On 5 December 2017, he was appointed as manager of Seoul E-Land.

In 2019, In was appointed as assistant manager of South Korea under-20 team. With them, he was the runner-up at the 2019 FIFA U-20 World Cup.
