= Seoul E-Land FC =

South Korean association football club

Seoul E-Land
- Full name: Seoul E-Land Football Club
- Nickname: The Leopards
- Short name: SEFC
- Founded: 2014; 12 years ago
- Ground: Mokdong Stadium
- Capacity: 15,511
- Owner: E-Land Group
- Chairman: Park Sung-kyung
- Head coach: Kim Do-kyun
- League: K League 2
- 2025: K League 2, 4th of 14
- Website: www.seoulelandfc.com
| Home colours | Away colours |

Seoul E-Land FC (Korean: 서울 이랜드 FC) is a South Korean professional football club based in Seoul that competes in K League 2, the second tier of South Korean football league system. The club was founded in 2014 and is owned by the E-Land Group.

Seoul E-Land play their home games at Mokdong Stadium, as their original home, the Seoul Olympic Stadium, is under reconstruction.

== History ==
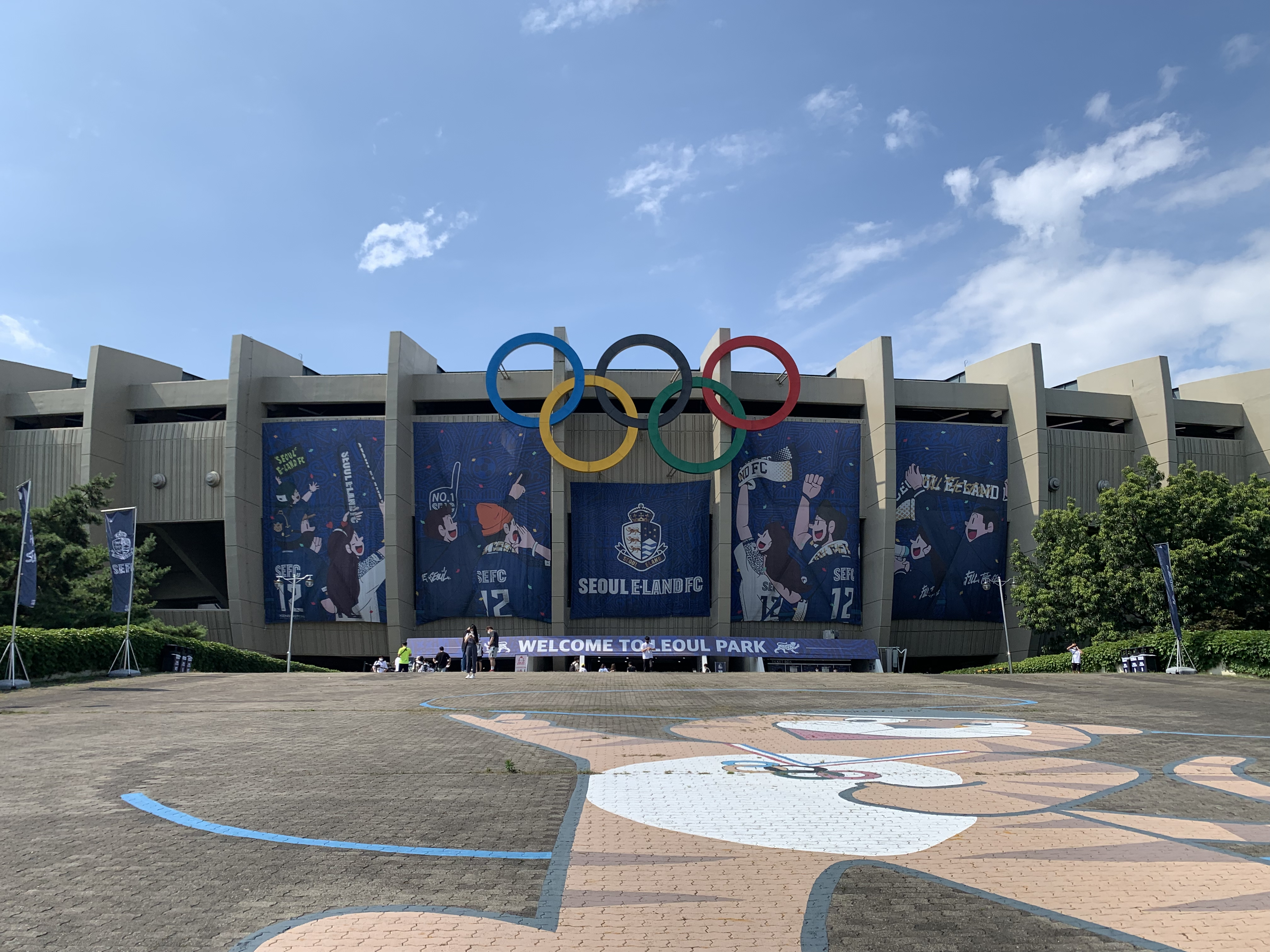
Seoul Olympic Stadium served as the club's home prior to its relocation to the Mokdong Stadium.

Seoul E-Land FC was established on 14 April 2014, when the E-Land Group officially announced the foundation of a professional football club based in Seoul. On 22 August, the Korea Football Association (KFA) approved the membership of the team. As a result, the club was granted membership to the K League Challenge (now K League 2) starting in 2015, with the Seoul Sports Complex in Seoul designated as its home stadium. The team name was chosen through a public naming process that involved a contest with 3,400 participants, a survey conducted in July and a fan forum held in August 2014. "Seoul E-Land FC" received the highest number of votes in the contest, surpassing alternatives such as "Eastern Seoul FC" and "Seoul Gangnam FC". The club formalized its affiliation with the Seoul Metropolitan Government in the following weeks, and prepared for its inaugural season in the K League Challenge under the leadership of its first head coach, Martin Rennie, who was appointed on 17 July. The club held its foundation ceremony on 21 March 2015, and played its first home match on 29 March.

In January 2022, the club announced that they would be moving to Mokdong Stadium, as their main stadium, the Seoul Olympic Stadium, underwent reconstruction. They played their first match at the new venue on 19 March 2022.

== Crest ==
The Seoul E-Land FC crest is designed to reflect the club's identity, values, and its connection to Seoul. It is represented by four key concepts based on the club's acronym SEFC: the symbol of Seoul, E-Land's corporate values, the club's football style, and the club's identity.

It includes symbols of Seoul, particularly the Han River and Namsan. The crest also features five stars, each representing the club's values, and three leopards, representing the team's playing style. These leopards are meant to reflect speed, endurance and skill, the three key qualities of the club's football. The crown at the top of the crest signifies the club’s identity as a champion in Asian football. The ribbon at the bottom represents the club’s identity as a source of joy and satisfaction for the citizens of Seoul. The crown’s design is inspired by the royal insignia of England.

== Players ==
=== Current squad ===
As of 18 August 2026

Note: Flags indicate national team as defined under FIFA eligibility rules; some limited exceptions apply. Players may hold more than one non-FIFA nationality.

| No. | Pos. | Nation | Player |
|---|---|---|---|
| 1 | GK | KOR | Min Seong-jun |
| 2 | DF | KOR | Park Jae-hwan |
| 3 | DF | KOR | Kang Min-jae |
| 5 | DF | ESP | Osmar |
| 6 | MF | KOR | Baek Ji-ung |
| 7 | FW | BRA | Euller |
| 8 | FW | KOR | Kim Hyun (vice-captain) |
| 10 | FW | BRA | Alan Cariús |
| 13 | DF | KOR | Oh In-pyo |
| 14 | FW | KOR | Kang Hyeon-je |
| 15 | MF | KOR | Kang Young-suk |
| 16 | FW | KOR | Park Jae-yong |
| 17 | DF | KOR | Choi Rang |
| 18 | GK | KOR | Ueom Ye-hoon |
| 19 | DF | KOR | Kim Ju-hwan |
| 20 | DF | KOR | Kim Oh-gyu (captain) |
| 21 | MF | KOR | Seo Jin-suk |

| No. | Pos. | Nation | Player |
|---|---|---|---|
| 22 | MF | KOR | Cho Joon-hyun |
| 23 | DF | KOR | Bae Seo-joon |
| 24 | MF | KOR | Yoon Seok-ju |
| 25 | GK | KOR | Yang Seung-min |
| 27 | FW | KOR | Park Sun-woo |
| 28 | DF | KOR | Jeong Yeon-won |
| 29 | DF | KOR | Kim Hyun-woo |
| 30 | MF | KOR | Park Chang-hwan (vice-captain) |
| 31 | GK | KOR | Hwang Jae-yun |
| 33 | DF | KOR | Son Hyeok-chan |
| 38 | DF | BRA | Caio Marcelo |
| 47 | FW | KOR | Lee Joo-hyuk |
| 70 | FW | KOR | An Joo-wan |
| 71 | GK | KOR | Kim Tae-san |
| 77 | FW | KOR | Hong Seok-jun |
| 90 | FW | BRA | Gabriel Santos |
| 99 | FW | KOR | Kim Woo-bin |

=== Out on loan and military service ===
Note: Flags indicate national team as defined under FIFA eligibility rules; some limited exceptions apply. Players may hold more than one non-FIFA nationality.

| No. | Pos. | Nation | Player |
|---|---|---|---|
| — | DF | KOR | Kim Min-kyu (at Gimcheon Sangmu for military service) |
| — | DF | KOR | Park Jin-young (at Chungbuk Cheongju) |
| — | FW | KOR | Byeon Gyung-jun (at Gimcheon Sangmu for military service) |

| No. | Pos. | Nation | Player |
|---|---|---|---|
| — | FW | KOR | Jeong Jae-min (at Gimcheon Sangmu for military service) |
| — | FW | KOR | Kim Gun (at Jincheon HR) |

== Management team ==
| Position | Name |
|---|---|
| Head coach | (South Korea) Kim Do-kyun |
| Coach | (South Korea) Cho Sung-rae |
| Assistant coach | (South Korea) Lee Ho |
| Goalkeeper coach | (South Korea) Kwon Soon-hyung |
| Fitness coaches | (South Korea) Park Seong-joon, (South Korea) Seo Young-kyun |
| Performance analyst | (Japan) Nagamine Hiroaki |

Source: Seoul E-Land FC.

== Managerial history ==
| No. | Name | Appointed | To | Season(s) |
|---|---|---|---|---|
| 1 | (Scotland) Martin Rennie | 2014/07/17 | 2016/06/15 | 2015–2016 |
| C | (South Korea) In Chang-soo | 2016/06/15 | 2016/06/24 | 2016 |
| 2 | (South Korea) Park Kun-ha | 2016/06/24 | 2017/01/09 | 2016 |
| 3 | (South Korea) Kim Byung-soo | 2017/01/09 | 2017/11/17 | 2017 |
| 4 | (South Korea) In Chang-soo | 2017/12/05 | 2018/12/31 | 2018 |
| 5 | (South Korea) Kim Hyun-soo | 2018/12/15 | 2019/05/22 | 2019 |
| C | (South Korea) Woo Sung-yong | 2019/05/22 | 2019/11/10 | 2019 |
| 6 | (South Korea) Chung Jung-yong | 2019/11/28 | 2022/10/25 | 2020–2022 |
| 7 | (South Korea) Park Choong-kyun | 2022/11/10 | 2023/11/30 | 2023 |
| 8 | (South Korea) Kim Do-kyun | 2023/12/14 | | 2024– |

== Season-by-season records ==
| Season | Division | Tms. | Pos. | Cup |
|---|---|---|---|---|
| 2015 | 2 | 11 | 4th | Round of 32 |
| 2016 | 2 | 11 | 6th | Round of 32 |
| 2017 | 2 | 10 | 8th | Third round |
| 2018 | 2 | 10 | 10th | Third round |
| 2019 | 2 | 10 | 10th | Round of 16 |
| 2020 | 2 | 10 | 5th | Third round |
| 2021 | 2 | 10 | 9th | Round of 16 |
| 2022 | 2 | 11 | 7th | Second round |
| 2023 | 2 | 13 | 11th | Round of 16 |
| 2024 | 2 | 13 | 3rd | Third round |
| 2025 | 2 | 14 | 4th | Second round |

Key

- Tms. = Number of teams
- Pos. = Position in league

== See also ==
- E-Land Puma FC
