= Pocheon Citizen FC =

- Full name: Pocheon Citizen Football Club 포천 시민 축구단
- Short name: PCSC
- Founded: 2008; 18 years ago
- Ground: Pocheon Stadium
- Capacity: 7,000
- Owner: Park Yoon-guk (Pocheon major)
- Manager: Kim Jae-hyung
- League: K3 League
- 2022: K3 League, 11th
- Website: http://www.pcfc2008.com/
Home colours	Away colours

Pocheon Citizen Football Club (Korean: 포천 시민 축구단) is a South Korean football club based in the city of Pocheon. The club is a member of the K3 League, a semi-professional league and the third tier of league football in South Korea.

== Honours ==
=== Domestic ===
- Challengers League / K3 League
  - Winners (6): 2009, 2012, 2013, 2015, 2016, 2017
  - Runners-up (1): 2014

=== Invitational ===
- Sheikh Kamal International Club Cup
  - Runners-up (1): 2017

== Season-by-season records ==
Season	Teams	Tier	Regular season placement	Playoffs	Pld	W	D	L	GF	GA	GD	Pts	FA Cup
2008	16	K3 League	14th	—	29	6	3	20	43	80	–37	21	DNQ
2009	17	K3 League	Winners	—	32	19	10	3	79	29	+50	67	DNQ
2010	18	K3 League	3rd in Group B	—	25	14	8	3	49	26	+23	50	Second Round
2011	16	K3 Challengers League	2nd in Group B	Semifinal	22	14	6	2	49	22	+27	48	Round of 32
2012	18	K3 Challengers League	1st in Group A	Winners	25	20	2	3	101	24	+77	62	Second Round
2013	18	K3 Challengers League	1st in Group A	Winners	25	20	4	1	77	21	+56	64	Second Round
2014	18	K3 Challengers League	1st in Group A	Runners-up	25	21	3	1	68	23	+45	66	Round of 16
2015	18	K3 League	1st in Group A	Winners	25	22	3	0	104	17	+87	69	Second Round
2016	20	K3 League	1st	Winners	19	16	2	1	52	14	+38	50	Round of 32
2017	12	K3 Advanced	1st	Winners	22	12	8	2	31	19	+12	44	Round of 16
2018	12	K3 Advanced	2nd	Semifinal	22	15	1	6	58	30	+28	46	Round of 32
2019	12	K3 Advanced	5th	Semifinal	22	12	3	7	30	21	+9	39	Round of 32
2020	13	K4 League	4th	4th	24	15	4	5	58	26	+32	49	First Round
2021	13	K4 League											Third Round

== Players ==
=== Current squad ===
As of 2 July 2022

Note: Flags indicate national team as defined under FIFA eligibility rules; some limited exceptions apply. Players may hold more than one non-FIFA nationality.

No.	Pos.	Nation	Player
1	GK	KOR	Im Hyung-geun
2	DF	KOR	Kim Tae-eun
3	DF	KOR	Kim Sung-jin
4	DF	KOR	Kang Young-hun
5	DF	KOR	Chung Lee
6	DF	KOR	Cho Han-uk
7	FW	KOR	Hwang Sin-young
8	FW	KOR	Kim Yeong-jun
9	FW	KOR	Kim Young-wook
10	MF	KOR	In Jun-yeon
11	FW	KOR	Jang Min-ho
12	MF	KOR	Kim Ye-dam
13	GK	KOR	Kim Jung-min
14	MF	KOR	Yoon Ju-hoon
15	DF	KOR	Seo Myeong-sik
16	MF	KOR	Kim Min-seob
17	MF	KOR	Im Chae-mun

No.	Pos.	Nation	Player
18	MF	KOR	Woo Ye-chan
19	FW	KOR	Kim Dong-ryul
20	MF	KOR	Kim Tae-hwi
21	FW	KOR	Oh Hee-chan
22	DF	KOR	Kim Han-bin
23	MF	KOR	No Yeong-hun
24	DF	KOR	Yoon Chan-woo
25	DF	KOR	Shin Min-cheol
27	FW	KOR	Lee Gwang-jae
28	MF	KOR	Park Jae-hoon
30	DF	KOR	Jeong Do-hyeob
31	GK	KOR	Kim Jae-yeon
33	MF	KOR	Wan Cho
37	FW	KOR	Lee Do-hyun
38	MF	KOR	Im Woo-seok
44	DF	KOR	Jeong Su-hwan
99	GK	KOR	Lee Gi-nam

=== Notable former players ===
- In Chang-soo
- Cho Hyang-gi
- Cho Hyung-jae
- Hwang Hun-hee
- Lee Keun-ho
- Park Hyung-jin
- Park Jung-soo
- Manish Dangi

== See also ==
- List of football clubs in South Korea
