= 2017 Ansan Greeners FC season =

Ansan Greeners
2017 season
- Chairman: Mayor of Ansan
- Manager: Lee Heung-sil
- Stadium: Ansan Wa~ Stadium
- K League Challenge: 5th
| Home colours | Away colours |

The 2017 season is Ansan Greeners FC's 1st season of existence. They will participate in the K League Challenge as well as the FA Cup.

== Transfers ==
=== Winter ===
In: Note: Flags indicate national team as defined under FIFA eligibility rules; some limited exceptions apply. Players may hold more than one non-FIFA nationality.

| No. | Pos. | Nation | Player |
|---|---|---|---|
| 1 | GK | KOR | Hwang Sung-min (from (South Korea) Ulsan Hyundai Mipo Dockyard) |
| 2 | DF | KOR | Park Chan-wool |
| 3 | DF | KOR | Son K-ryun |
| 4 | DF | KOR | Song Joo-ho (from (South Korea) Ulsan Hyundai Mipo Dockyard) |
| 5 | MF | KOR | Park Jun-hui (to (South Korea) Pohang Steelers) |
| 6 | DF | KOR | Park Han-soo (from (South Korea) Ulsan Hyundai Mipo Dockyard) |
| 7 | FW | KOR | Lee Min-woo (from (South Korea) Mokpo City) |
| 8 | FW | KOR | Han Geon-yong (from (South Korea) Ulsan Hyundai Mipo Dockyard) |
| 9 | MF | KOR | Chang Hyuk-jin (to (South Korea) Gangwon) |
| 10 | FW | UZB | Bahodir Nasimov (from (Uzbekistan) Bunyodkor) |
| 11 | FW | BRA | William Henrique (from (Brazil) Ceará) |
| 13 | DF | KOR | Kang Tae-wook (from (South Korea) Ulsan Hyundai Mipo Dockyard) |
| 14 | FW | URU | Raúl Tarragona (from (Uruguay) Rentistas) |
| 15 | MF | KOR | Jeong Hyeon-sik |
| 16 | MF | KOR | Yoo Yeon-seung (from (South Korea) Ulsan Hyundai Mipo Dockyard) |
| 17 | FW | KOR | Lee Geon |
| 18 | MF | KOR | Jung Kyung-ho (from (South Korea) Ulsan Hyundai Mipo Dockyard) |
| 19 | MF | KOR | Park Gyeong-ik (from (South Korea) Ulsan Hyundai Mipo Dockyard) |
| 20 | DF | KOR | Lee In-jae (from (South Korea) Ulsan Hyundai Mipo Dockyard) |
| 21 | GK | KOR | Hwang In-jae (from (South Korea) Gwangju) |
| 22 | DF | KOR | Kim Myeong-jae (from (South Korea) Gimhae) |
| 23 | DF | KOR | Oh Yoon-seok (from (South Korea) Ulsan Hyundai Mipo Dockyard) |
| 24 | FW | KOR | Kwak Seong-chan (from (South Korea) Ulsan Hyundai Mipo Dockyard) |
| 25 | DF | KOR | Seo Jae-beom |
| 27 | DF | KOR | Seo Joon-young |
| 28 | MF | KOR | Lee Dae-ho |
| 29 | MF | KOR | Lee Seung-hwan |
| 30 | FW | KOR | Ryu Hyeon-jin |
| 31 | GK | KOR | Cha Kang |
| 32 | FW | KOR | Hong Jae-hoon |
| 34 | FW | KOR | Shin Seon-jin |
| 45 | FW | MNE | Luka Rotković (from (Belarus) Dinamo Minsk) |

Out: Note: Flags indicate national team as defined under FIFA eligibility rules; some limited exceptions apply. Players may hold more than one non-FIFA nationality.

| No. | Pos. | Nation | Player |

=== Summer ===
In: Note: Flags indicate national team as defined under FIFA eligibility rules; some limited exceptions apply. Players may hold more than one non-FIFA nationality.

| No. | Pos. | Nation | Player |
|---|---|---|---|
| 11 | MF | KOR | Hong Dong-hyun (from (South Korea) Busan IPark) |
| 77 | MF | KOR | Jo Woo-jin (from (Indonesia) Gresik United) |
| — | MF | KOR | Kim Byung-suk (from (South Korea) Seoul E-Land) |

Out: Note: Flags indicate national team as defined under FIFA eligibility rules; some limited exceptions apply. Players may hold more than one non-FIFA nationality.

| No. | Pos. | Nation | Player |
|---|---|---|---|
| 11 | FW | BRA | William Henrique (from (Brazil) Londrina) |

== Squad ==
As of match played 29 October 2017

| No. | Name | Nationality | Position | Date of birth (age) | Signed from | Signed in | Contract ends | Apps. | Goals |
Goalkeepers
| 1 | Hwang Sung-min | (South Korea) | GK | 23 June 1991 (age 35) | Ulsan Hyundai Mipo Dockyard | 2017 | | 30 | 0 |
| 21 | Hwang In-jae | (South Korea) | GK | | Gwangju | 2017 | | 7 | 0 |
| 31 | Cha Kang | (South Korea) | GK | | | 2017 | | 0 | 0 |
Defenders
| 2 | Park Chan-wool | (South Korea) | DF | 28 April 1993 (age 33) | | 2017 | | 14 | 0 |
| 3 | Son K-ryun | (South Korea) | DF | 22 March 1995 (age 31) | | 2017 | | 26 | 0 |
| 4 | Song Joo-ho | (South Korea) | DF | 20 March 1991 (age 35) | Ulsan Hyundai Mipo Dockyard | 2017 | | 24 | 0 |
| 6 | Park Han-soo | (South Korea) | DF | 15 January 1991 (age 35) | Ulsan Hyundai Mipo Dockyard | 2017 | | 24 | 3 |
| 13 | Kang Tae-wook | (South Korea) | DF | 28 May 1992 (age 34) | Ulsan Hyundai Mipo Dockyard | 2017 | | 10 | 0 |
| 20 | Lee In-jae | (South Korea) | DF | 13 May 1992 (age 34) | Ulsan Hyundai Mipo Dockyard | 2017 | | 16 | 2 |
| 22 | Kim Myeong-jae | (South Korea) | DF | 9 May 1994 (age 32) | Gimhae | 2017 | | 9 | 1 |
| 23 | Oh Yoon-seok | (South Korea) | DF | 3 December 1990 (age 35) | Ulsan Hyundai Mipo Dockyard | 2017 | | 12 | 0 |
| 25 | Seo Jae-beom | (South Korea) | DF | 3 February 1994 (age 32) | | 2017 | | 0 | 0 |
| 27 | Seo Joon-young | (South Korea) | DF | 29 September 1995 (age 31) | | 2017 | | 3 | 0 |
| 30 | Ryu Hyeon-jin | (South Korea) | DF | 23 January 1995 (age 31) | | 2017 | | 9 | 0 |
Midfielders
| 5 | Park Jun-hui | (South Korea) | MF | 1 March 1991 (age 35) | Pohang Steelers | 2017 | | 22 | 1 |
| 9 | Chang Hyuk-jin | (South Korea) | MF | 6 December 1989 (age 36) | Gangwon | 2017 | | 33 | 2 |
| 11 | Hong Dong-hyun | (South Korea) | MF | 30 October 1991 (age 35) | Busan IPark | 2017 | | 9 | 0 |
| 15 | Jeong Hyeon-sik | (South Korea) | MF | 22 November 1990 (age 35) | Ulsan Hyundai Mipo Dockyard | 2017 | | 28 | 0 |
| 16 | Yoo Yeon-seung | (South Korea) | MF | 21 December 1991 (age 34) | Ulsan Hyundai Mipo Dockyard | 2017 | | 26 | 1 |
| 18 | Jung Kyung-ho | (South Korea) | MF | 12 January 1987 (age 39) | Ulsan Hyundai Mipo Dockyard | 2017 | | 24 | 3 |
| 19 | Park Gyeong-ik | (South Korea) | MF | 4 February 1995 (age 31) | Ulsan Hyundai Mipo Dockyard | 2017 | | 16 | 1 |
| 26 | Kim Min-sung | (South Korea) | MF | 21 February 1995 (age 31) | | 2017 | | 12 | 0 |
| 28 | Lee Dae-ho | (South Korea) | MF | 12 July 1994 (age 32) | | 2017 | | 1 | 0 |
| 29 | Lee Seung-hwan | (South Korea) | MF | | | 2017 | | 0 | 0 |
| 77 | Jo Woo-jin | (South Korea) | MF | 7 July 1987 (age 39) | Gresik United | 2017 | | 14 | 0 |
| | Kim Byung-suk | (South Korea) | MF | 17 September 1985 (age 41) | Seoul E-Land | 2017 | | 0 | 0 |
Forwards
| 7 | Lee Min-woo | (South Korea) | FW | 1 December 1991 (age 34) | Mokpo City | 2017 | | 24 | 1 |
| 8 | Han Geon-yong | (South Korea) | FW | 28 June 1991 (age 35) | Ulsan Hyundai Mipo Dockyard | 2017 | | 25 | 2 |
| 10 | Bahodir Nasimov | (Uzbekistan) | FW | 2 May 1987 (age 39) | Bunyodkor | 2017 | | 23 | 2 |
| 14 | Raúl Tarragona | (Uruguay) | FW | 6 March 1987 (age 39) | Rentistas | 2017 | | 31 | 15 |
| 17 | Lee Geon | (South Korea) | FW | 8 January 1996 (age 30) | | 2017 | | 21 | 0 |
| 24 | Kwak Seong-chan | (South Korea) | FW | 12 July 1993 (age 33) | Ulsan Hyundai Mipo Dockyard | 2017 | | 6 | 0 |
| 32 | Hong Jae-hoon | (South Korea) | FW | 11 September 1996 (age 30) | | 2017 | | 0 | 0 |
| 34 | Shin Seon-jin | (South Korea) | FW | | | 2017 | | 0 | 0 |
| 45 | Luka Rotković | (Montenegro) | FW | 5 July 1988 (age 38) | Dinamo Minsk | 2017 | | 10 | 1 |
Players who left during the season
| 11 | William Henrique | (Brazil) | FW | 28 January 1992 (age 34) | Ceará | 2017 | | 2 | 0 |

== Competitions ==
=== K League Challenge ===
==== Results summary ====
| Overall | | | | | | | | Home | | | | | | Away | | | | | |
| Pld | W | D | L | GF | GA | GD | Pts | W | D | L | GF | GA | GD | W | D | L | GF | GA | GD |
|---|---|---|---|---|---|---|---|---|---|---|---|---|---|---|---|---|---|---|---|
| 36 | 7 | 12 | 17 | 36 | 54 | −18 | 33 | 4 | 7 | 7 | 20 | 27 | −7 | 3 | 5 | 10 | 16 | 27 | −11 |

Last updated: 29 October 2017.
Source: See Results

==== Results by round ====
| Round | 1 | 2 | 3 | 4 | 5 | 6 | 7 | 8 | 9 | 10 | 11 | 12 | 13 | 14 | 15 | 16 | 17 | 18 | 19 | 20 | 21 | 22 | 23 | 24 | 25 | 26 | 27 | 28 | 29 | 30 | 31 | 32 | 33 | 34 | 35 | 36 |
|---|---|---|---|---|---|---|---|---|---|---|---|---|---|---|---|---|---|---|---|---|---|---|---|---|---|---|---|---|---|---|---|---|---|---|---|---|
| Ground | H | A | H | A | H | H | A | A | H | A | H | H | A | H | A | H | A | H | A | H | H | A | A | A | A | H | H | A | H | A | A | H | A | H | H | A |
| Result | W | L | W | L | L | D | L | L | L | L | W | D | L | L | D | D | W | L | D | D | D | D | L | W | L | D | L | L | L | W | L | W | D | L | D | D |
| Position | 1 | 5 | 5 | 6 | 6 | 6 | 7 | 7 | 7 | 8 | 7 | 7 | 8 | 9 | 9 | 8 | 8 | 8 | 8 | 8 | 8 | 8 | 8 | 8 | 9 | 9 | 9 | 9 | 9 | 9 | 9 | 9 | 9 | 9 | 9 | 9 |

Source: See Results
A = Away; H = Home; W = Win; D = Draw; L = Loss

==== Results ====
| 4 March 2017 1 | Ansan Greeners | 2 – 1 | Daejeon Citizen | Ansan |
| 15:00 KST (UTC+9) | Nasimov 41'; Kang (yellow card) 67'; Han 90+2' | Report | Kim.D-y (yellow card) 47'; Kim.S-s 49'; Kim T-e (yellow card) 50'; Kim J-k (yellow card) 79' | Stadium: Ansan Wa~ Stadium; Attendance: 8,405; Referee: Park Byung-Jin |

| 11 March 2017 2 | Busan IPark | 3 – 1 | Ansan Greeners | Busan |
| 15:00 KST (UTC+9) | Heo 22' (yellow card) 49'; Lee J-h 45'; Lukian 51' (pen.) | Report | Yoo 27'; Park H-s (yellow card) 49'; Chang (yellow card) 83'; Rotković (yellow card) 90' | Stadium: Busan Gudeok Stadium; Attendance: 6,337; Referee: Park Jin-Ho |

| 19 March 2017 3 | Ansan Greeners | 1 – 0 | Anyang | Ansan |
| 15:00 KST (UTC+9) | Rotković 71'; Tarragona (yellow card) 90+1' | Report | Jô (yellow card) 26'; Kim T-h (yellow card) 34' | Stadium: Ansan Wa~ Stadium; Attendance: 3,013; Referee: Choi Kwang-Ho |

| 26 March 2017 4 | Seoul E-Land | 1 – 0 | Ansan Greeners | Seoul |
| 15:00 KST (UTC+9) | Kim.M-k 67' | Report | Tarragona (yellow card) 73'; Yoo (yellow card) 81' | Stadium: Seoul Olympic Stadium; Attendance: 2.228; Referee: Jo Ji-Im |

| 1 April 2017 5 | Ansan Greeners | 2 – 4 | Bucheon FC 1995 | Ansan |
| 17:00 KST (UTC+9) | Jeong (yellow card) 36'; Park H-s 45'; Nasimov (yellow card) 66'; Han (yellow card) 73'; Chang 77' | Report | Kim.S 16'; Jin (yellow card) 37'; Moon 58'; Nilson 64'; Waguininho (yellow card) 80'; Park H-s 81' (o.g.) | Stadium: Ansan Wa~ Stadium; Attendance: 1,596; Referee: Kim Dong-In |

| 9 April 2017 6 | Ansan Greeners | 3 – 3 | Suwon | Ansan |
| 15:00 KST (UTC+9) | Lee.I-j 38'; Nasimov 45+1'; Lee.G (yellow card) 48'; Tarragona 71' | Report | Lee.S-h 43', 56'; Adžić (yellow card) 49'; Djite 52' | Stadium: Ansan Wa~ Stadium; Attendance: 2,587; Referee: Park Jin-Ho |

| 15 April 2017 7 | Asan Mugunghwa | 1 – 0 | Ansan Greeners | Asan |
| 15:00 KST (UTC+9) | Kim.D-s (yellow card) 13'; Jung.D-h (yellow card) 14'; Gong (yellow card) 30'; Lee.C-y 82' | Report | Yoo (yellow card) 34' (yellow-red card) 90+3' | Stadium: Yi Sun-sin Stadium; Attendance: 820; Referee: Jung Dong-Sik |

| 23 April 2017 8 | Gyeongnam | 3 – 0 | Ansan Greeners | Changwon |
| 15:00 KST (UTC+9) | Marcão 20'; Bruno (yellow card) 22'; Jung 51'; Kim.D-y 90+3' | Report | Chang (yellow card) 37'; Lee.G (yellow card) 50' | Stadium: Changwon Football Center; Attendance: 1,229; Referee: Chae Sang-Hyeop |

| 29 April 2017 9 | Ansan Greeners | 0 – 1 | Seongnam | Ansan |
| 15:00 KST (UTC+9) | Lee.G (yellow card) 17'; Lee.I-j (yellow card) 34'; Park.J-h (yellow card) 73'; Park.H-s (yellow card) 90+1' | Report | Hwang.U-j 7'; Oh.D-h (yellow card) 45+1'; Kim.D-he (yellow card) 80' | Stadium: Ansan Wa~ Stadium; Attendance: 2,062; Referee: Kim Young-Su |

| 3 May 2017 10 | Bucheon FC 1995 | 2 – 0 | Ansan Greeners | Bucheon |
| 19:00 KST (UTC+9) | Lee.Ju-w (yellow card) 15'; Moon (yellow card) 65' (goal) 81'; Kim.S 80' | Report | Rotković (yellow card) 57'; Chang (yellow card) 60' | Stadium: Bucheon Stadium; Attendance: 1,335; Referee: Jung Dong-Sik |

| 6 May 2017 11 | Ansan Greeners | 2 – 0 | Asan Mugunghwa | Ansan |
| 15:00 KST (UTC+9) | Tarragona 43', 90' (yellow card) 84'; Jung (yellow card) 82'; Park.J-h (yellow card) 87' | Report | Kim.E-s (yellow card) 19' (goal) 50'; Jo (yellow card) 47'; Joo (yellow card) 66' | Stadium: Ansan Wa~ Stadium; Attendance: 1,184; Referee: Kim Dong-In |

| 13 May 2017 12 | Ansan Greeners | 0 – 0 | Suwon | Ansan |
| 15:00 KST (UTC+9) | Lee.M-w (yellow card) 35'; Son (yellow card) 74' | Report | Leijer (yellow card) 12'; Lim.C-g (yellow card) 35' | Stadium: Ansan Wa~ Stadium; Attendance: 915; Referee: Kim Young-Su |

| 21 May 2017 13 | Anyang | 2 – 1 | Ansan Greeners | Anyang |
| 19:00 KST (UTC+9) | Choi.J-h 31'; Bang (yellow card) 61'; Song 70' (o.g.) | Report | Yoo (yellow card) 20'; Jeong (yellow card) 43'; Kim.M-j 67' | Stadium: Anyang Sports Complex; Attendance: 1,625; Referee: Chae Sang-Hyeop |

| 29 May 2017 14 | Ansan Greeners | 1 – 2 | Seoul E-Land | Ansan |
| 19:30 KST (UTC+9) | Yoo (yellow card) 57'; Chang 66' | Report | Myung 29' (yellow card) 34'; Wada 90+3' | Stadium: Ansan Wa~ Stadium; Attendance: 1,412; Referee: Jung Dong-Sik |

| 3 June 2017 15 | Seongnam | 0 – 0 | Ansan Greeners | Seongnam |
| 19:00 KST (UTC+9) | Lee (yellow card) 19'; Paulo Sérgio (yellow card) 88' | Report | Tarragona (yellow card) 27'; Lee.G (yellow card) 56'; Park.H (yellow card) 82'; Jung (yellow card) 83' | Stadium: Tancheon Sports Complex; Attendance: 2,901; Referee: Lee Dong-Jun |

| 11 June 2017 16 | Ansan Greeners | 3 – 3 | Gyeongnam | Ansan |
| 19:00 KST (UTC+9) | Lee.G (yellow card) 18'; Kim.M-s (yellow card) 28'; Song (yellow card) 54'; Tarragona 58', 70'; Jung 64' | Report | Ahn (yellow card) 55'; Park.Ji-so 66'; Choi.Y 84'; Song.J 85' | Stadium: Ansan Wa~ Stadium; Attendance: 3,184; Referee: Seol Tae-Hwan |

| 17 June 2017 17 | Daejeon Citizen | 1 – 2 | Ansan Greeners | Daejeon |
| 19:00 KST (UTC+9) | Kim.T-e (yellow card) 33'; Shengelia 90+1' | Report | Tarragona 68'; Park H-s 77'; Lee.G (yellow card) 82' | Stadium: Daejeon World Cup Stadium; Attendance: 4,130; Referee: Park Byung-Jin |

| 26 June 2017 18 | Ansan Greeners | 0 – 3 | Busan IPark | Ansan |
| 19:30 KST (UTC+9) | Oh.Y-s (yellow card) 69'; R.H-j (yellow card) 73' | Report | Morais 30'; Ku.H-j (yellow card) 47'; Yasuda 59'; Lee.K-s 86'; Lukian (yellow card) 90+2' | Stadium: Ansan Wa~ Stadium; Attendance: 3,267; Referee: Kim Young-Su |

| 1 July 2017 19 | Asan Mugunghwa | 0 – 0 | Ansan Greeners | Asan |
| 19:00 KST (UTC+9) | N.J-j (yellow card) 33'; Kim.J-y (yellow card) 70' | Report | Lee.G (yellow card) 28' | Stadium: Yi Sun-sin Stadium; Attendance: 803; Referee: Park Pil-Jun |

| 16 July 2017 20 | Ansan Greeners | 1 – 1 | Seongnam | Ansan |
| 19:00 KST (UTC+9) | Song.J-h (yellow card) 13'; Tarragona 15'; Lee.G (yellow card) 42'; Park.J-h (yellow card) 42' (yellow-red card) 80' | Report | An.S-h (yellow card) 45'; Kim.D-c 82' (pen.); Oršulić (yellow card) 90' | Stadium: Ansan Wa~ Stadium; Attendance: 3,543; Referee: Jung Dong-Sik |

| 22 July 2017 21 | Ansan Greeners | 1 – 1 | Daejeon Citizen | Ansan |
| 19:00 KST (UTC+9) | Jung.K-h 79'; Song.J-h (yellow card) 86' | Report | Dănălache 19' (yellow card) 75'; Jang.J-y (yellow card) 54' | Stadium: Ansan Wa~ Stadium; Attendance: 2,351; Referee: Park Jin-Ho |

| 30 July 2017 22 | Seoul E-Land | 3 – 3 | Ansan Greeners | Seoul |
| 19:00 KST (UTC+9) | Alex (yellow card) 42' (goal) 49'; Kim.C-w 61' (yellow card) 67'; Myung.J-j 65' | Report | Tarragona 8', 44'; Park.H-s (yellow card) 26'; Park.J-h 73'; Kwak.S-c (yellow card) 90+2' | Stadium: Seoul Olympic Stadium; Attendance: 802; Referee: Choi Gyu-Hyun |

| 5 August 2017 23 | Gyeongnam | 3 – 1 | Ansan Greeners | Changwon |
| 19:00 KST (UTC+9) | Choi 54'; Gwon 66'; Cho 78' | Report | Song (yellow card) 19'; Park (yellow card) 63'; Jung 76' | Stadium: Changwon Football Center; Attendance: 1,553; Referee: Jo Ji-Im |

| 13 August 2017 24 | Suwon | 0 – 4 | Ansan Greeners | Suwon |
| 19:00 KST (UTC+9) | Bae.J-h (yellow card) 18'; Djite (yellow card) 28'; Leijer (red card) 69' | Report | Han.G-y 44'; Park.G-i (yellow card) 53' (goal) 55'; Tarragona 77', 88'; Hong.D-h (yellow card) 78' | Stadium: Suwon Sports Complex; Attendance: 1,529; Referee: Kim Dong-In |

| 19 August 2017 25 | Busan IPark | 3 – 0 | Ansan Greeners | Busan |
| 19:00 KST (UTC+9) | Hong.J-g 5' (yellow card) 29'; Lim.S-h (yellow card) 19'; Lee.J-k 50'; Lee.C-w (yellow card) 87'; Jung.S-h 88' | Report | Park.J-h (yellow card) 45'; Chang.H-j (yellow card) 62' | Stadium: Busan Gudeok Stadium; Attendance: 2,499; Referee: Song Min-Seok |

| 23 August 2017 26 | Ansan Greeners | 2 – 2 | Anyang | Ansan |
| 19:30 KST (UTC+9) | Han.G-y 87'; Yoo.Y-s (yellow card) 88'; Park.H-s 90'; Lee.I-j (yellow card) 90+5'; Song.J-h (yellow card) 90+6' | Report | Yong.J-h (yellow card) 44' (yellow-red card); Kouakou (yellow card) 48'; Kim.H-g (yellow card) 75' (goal) 90+7'; Cho.S-j 79' | Stadium: Ansan Wa~ Stadium; Attendance: 1,876; Referee: Kim Dae-Yong |

| 26 August 2017 27 | Ansan Greeners | 0 – 2 | Bucheon FC 1995 | Ansan |
| 20:00 KST (UTC+9) | Park.C-w (yellow card) 79'; Tarragona (yellow card) 90+2' | Report | Lim.D-h 17' (yellow card) 45'; Cho.B-s (yellow card) 44'; Waguininho 67' (yellow card) 75' | Stadium: Ansan Wa~ Stadium; Attendance: 4,396; Referee: Kim Dong-In |

| 2 September 2017 28 | Seongnam | 1 – 0 | Ansan Greeners | Seongnam |
| 19:00 KST (UTC+9) | Park.S-h 88' (pen.) | Report | Song.J-h (yellow card) 64'; Jeong.H-s (yellow card) 78'; Han.G-y (yellow card) 90+4' | Stadium: Tancheon Sports Complex; Attendance: 1,803; Referee: Jung Dong-Sik |

| 9 September 2017 29 | Ansan Greeners | 0 – 1 | Busan IPark | Ansan |
| 19:00 KST (UTC+9) | Chang H-j (yellow card) 9' | Report | Rômulo (yellow card) 46'; Danny Morais (yellow card) 74'; Hong.J-g 89' | Stadium: Ansan Wa~ Stadium; Referee: Chae Sang-Hyeop |

| 17 September 2017 30 | Suwon | 0 – 2 | Ansan Greeners | Suwon |
| 19:00 KST (UTC+9) | Lee.K-j (yellow card) 9'; Jung.H (yellow card) 30'; Adžić (yellow card) 37'; Lee.H-s (yellow card) 75' | Report | Tarragona 11' (pen.), 63'; Jo.W-j (yellow card) 68' | Stadium: Suwon Sports Complex; Referee: Choi Kwang-Ho |

| 23 September 2017 31 | Anyang | 2 – 0 | Ansan Greeners | Anyang |
| 19:00 KST (UTC+9) | Kouakou (yellow card) 52'; Kim.S-c 77'; Lukian 87' | Report | Jeong.H-s (yellow card) 15' | Stadium: Anyang Sports Complex; Attendance: 3,939; Referee: Park Byung-Jin |

| 1 October 2017 32 | Ansan Greeners | 1 – 0 | Gyeongnam | Ansan |
| 15:00 KST (UTC+9) | Park.C-w (yellow card) 48'; Yoo.Y-s (yellow card) 65'; Lee.J-h 90+4' (o.g.) | Report | Kim.s-w (yellow card) 30'; Alex Bruno (red card) 67' | Stadium: Ansan Wa~ Stadium; Attendance: 1,309; Referee: Chae Sang-Hyeop |

| 8 October 2017 33 | Bucheon FC 1995 | 1 – 1 | Ansan Greeners | Bucheon |
| 15:00 KST (UTC+9) | Waguininho (yellow card) 37'; Jin.C-s (yellow card) 53'; Moon.K-h 90' | Report | Song.J-h (yellow card) 16'; Tarragona 57'; Nasimov (yellow card) 73'; Hong.D-h (yellow card) 79'; Park.J-h (red card) 89' | Stadium: Bucheon Stadium; Attendance: 1,874; Referee: Kim Dong-In |

| 15 October 2017 34 | Ansan Greeners | 0 – 1 | Asan Mugunghwa | Ansan |
| 15:00 KST (UTC+9) | Tarragona (yellow card) 20'; Nasimov (yellow card) 36' | Report | Kim.J-g (yellow card) 25'; Lee.J-a 71' | Stadium: Ansan Wa~ Stadium; Attendance: 1,141; Referee: Kim Young-Su |

| 21 October 2017 35 | Ansan Greeners | 1 – 1 | Seoul E-Land | Ansan |
| 15:00 KST (UTC+9) | Lee.I-j 78' (yellow card) 85' | Report | Choi.H-j (yellow card) 32'; Alex 51'; Choi.O-b (yellow card) 80'; Joo.H-s (yellow card) 90' | Stadium: Ansan Wa~ Stadium; Attendance: 3,712; Referee: Seo Dong-Jin |

| 29 October 2017 36 | Daejeon Citizen | 1 – 1 | Ansan Greeners | Daejeon |
| 15:00 KST (UTC+9) | Jang.W-s (yellow card) 81'; Kim.C-h 82' | Report | Tarragona 21' | Stadium: Daejeon World Cup Stadium; Attendance: 2,428; Referee: Park Byung-Jin |

==== League table ====
| Pos | Team | Pld | W | D | L | GF | GA | GD | Pts |
|---|---|---|---|---|---|---|---|---|---|
| 8 | Seoul E-Land | 36 | 7 | 14 | 15 | 42 | 55 | −13 | 35 |
| 9 | Ansan Greeners | 36 | 7 | 12 | 17 | 36 | 54 | −18 | 33 |
| 10 | Daejeon Citizen | 36 | 6 | 11 | 19 | 41 | 60 | −19 | 29 |

Source: K League
Rules for classification: 1) Points; 2) Goals scored; 3) Goal difference; 4) Wins; 5) Head-to-head points.

=== FA Cup ===
| 29 March 2017 Third Round | Gangneung City | 0 – 0 (a.e.t.) (5–4 p) | Ansan Greeners | Gangneung |
| 19:00 KST (UTC+9) | Kim J-h (yellow card) 120' | Report | Ryu (yellow card) 8'; Kang (yellow card) 85' | Stadium: Gangneung Stadium; Attendance: 130; Referee: Yoon Won-bae |

== Squad statistics ==
As of Match played 29 October 2017

=== Appearances and goals ===
| No. | Pos | Nat | Player | Total | | K League Challenge | | FA Cup | |
| No. | Pos | Nat | Player | Apps | Goals | Apps | Goals | Apps | Goals |
|---|---|---|---|---|---|---|---|---|---|
| 1 | GK | (South Korea) KOR | Hwang Sung-min | 30 | 0 | 30 | 0 | 0 | 0 |
| 2 | DF | (South Korea) KOR | Park Chan-wool | 14 | 0 | 13 | 0 | 0+1 | 0 |
| 3 | DF | (South Korea) KOR | Son K-ryun | 26 | 0 | 22+3 | 0 | 1 | 0 |
| 4 | DF | (South Korea) KOR | Song Joo-ho | 24 | 0 | 22+2 | 0 | 0 | 0 |
| 5 | MF | (South Korea) KOR | Park Jun-hui | 22 | 1 | 21+1 | 1 | 0 | 0 |
| 6 | DF | (South Korea) KOR | Park Han-soo | 24 | 3 | 23+1 | 3 | 0 | 0 |
| 7 | FW | (South Korea) KOR | Lee Min-woo | 24 | 0 | 15+9 | 0 | 0 | 0 |
| 8 | FW | (South Korea) KOR | Han Geon-yong | 25 | 3 | 15+9 | 3 | 1 | 0 |
| 9 | MF | (South Korea) KOR | Chang Hyuk-jin | 33 | 2 | 33 | 2 | 0 | 0 |
| 10 | FW | (Uzbekistan) UZB | Bahodir Nasimov | 23 | 2 | 17+6 | 2 | 0 | 0 |
| 11 | MF | (South Korea) KOR | Hong Dong-hyun | 10 | 0 | 5+5 | 0 | 0 | 0 |
| 13 | DF | (South Korea) KOR | Kang Tae-wook | 10 | 0 | 5+4 | 0 | 1 | 0 |
| 14 | FW | (Uruguay) URU | Raúl Tarragona | 31 | 15 | 29+2 | 15 | 0 | 0 |
| 15 | MF | (South Korea) KOR | Jeong Hyeon-sik | 28 | 0 | 22+6 | 0 | 0 | 0 |
| 16 | MF | (South Korea) KOR | Yoo Yeon-seung | 26 | 1 | 24+2 | 1 | 0 | 0 |
| 17 | FW | (South Korea) KOR | Lee Geon | 21 | 0 | 21 | 0 | 0 | 0 |
| 18 | MF | (South Korea) KOR | Jung Kyung-ho | 24 | 3 | 8+15 | 3 | 1 | 0 |
| 19 | MF | (South Korea) KOR | Park Gyeong-ik | 16 | 1 | 15 | 1 | 1 | 0 |
| 20 | DF | (South Korea) KOR | Lee In-jae | 16 | 2 | 16 | 2 | 0 | 0 |
| 21 | GK | (South Korea) KOR | Hwang In-jae | 7 | 0 | 6 | 0 | 1 | 0 |
| 22 | DF | (South Korea) KOR | Kim Myeong-jae | 9 | 1 | 3+5 | 1 | 1 | 0 |
| 23 | DF | (South Korea) KOR | Oh Yoon-seok | 12 | 0 | 9+2 | 0 | 1 | 0 |
| 24 | FW | (South Korea) KOR | Kwak Seong-chan | 6 | 0 | 1+4 | 0 | 0+1 | 0 |
| 26 | MF | (South Korea) KOR | Kim Min-sung | 12 | 0 | 7+4 | 0 | 1 | 0 |
| 27 | DF | (South Korea) KOR | Seo Joon-young | 3 | 0 | 2 | 0 | 0+1 | 0 |
| 28 | MF | (South Korea) KOR | Lee Dae-ho | 1 | 0 | 0 | 0 | 0+1 | 0 |
| 30 | DF | (South Korea) KOR | Ryu Hyeon-jin | 9 | 0 | 1+7 | 0 | 1 | 0 |
| 45 | FW | (Montenegro) MNE | Luka Rotković | 10 | 1 | 2+7 | 1 | 1 | 0 |
| 77 | MF | (South Korea) KOR | Jo Woo-jin | 14 | 0 | 10+4 | 0 | 0 | 0 |
Players away from Ansan Greeners on loan:
Players who left Ansan Greeners during the season:
| 11 | FW | (Brazil) BRA | William Henrique | 2 | 0 | 0+2 | 0 | 0 | 0 |

=== Goal scorers ===
| Place | Position | Nation | Number | Name | K League Challenge | FA Cup | Total |
|---|---|---|---|---|---|---|---|
| 1 | FW | (Uruguay) | 14 | Raúl Tarragona | 15 | 0 | 15 |
| 2 | MF | (South Korea) | 18 | Jung Kyung-ho | 3 | 0 | 3 |
| 2 | DF | (South Korea) | 6 | Park Han-soo | 3 | 0 | 3 |
| 2 | FW | (South Korea) | 8 | Han Geon-yong | 3 | 0 | 3 |
| 5 | FW | (Uzbekistan) | 10 | Bahodir Nasimov | 2 | 0 | 2 |
| 5 | MF | (South Korea) | 9 | Chang Hyuk-jin | 2 | 0 | 2 |
| 5 | DF | (South Korea) | 20 | Lee In-jae | 2 | 0 | 2 |
| 8 | MF | (South Korea) | 16 | Yoo Yeon-seung | 1 | 0 | 1 |
| 8 | FW | (Montenegro) | 45 | Luka Rotković | 1 | 0 | 1 |
| 8 | DF | (South Korea) | 22 | Kim Myeong-jae | 1 | 0 | 1 |
| 8 | MF | (South Korea) | 5 | Park Jun-hui | 1 | 0 | 1 |
| 8 | MF | (South Korea) | 19 | Park Gyeong-ik | 1 | 0 | 1 |
| 8 | | | | Own goal | 1 | 0 | 1 |
| | | | | TOTALS | 36 | 0 | 36 |

=== Disciplinary record ===
| Number | Nation | Position | Name | K League Challenge | | FA Cup | | Total | |
| Number | Nation | Position | Name | Yellow card | Red card | Yellow card | Red card | Yellow card | Red card |
| 2 | (South Korea) | DF | Park Chan-wool | 2 | 0 | 0 | 0 | 2 | 0 |
| 3 | (South Korea) | DF | Son K-ryun | 1 | 0 | 0 | 0 | 1 | 0 |
| 4 | (South Korea) | DF | Song Joo-ho | 7 | 0 | 0 | 0 | 7 | 0 |
| 5 | (South Korea) | DF | Park Jun-hui | 5 | 2 | 0 | 0 | 5 | 2 |
| 6 | (South Korea) | DF | Park Han-soo | 5 | 0 | 0 | 0 | 5 | 0 |
| 7 | (South Korea) | FW | Lee Min-woo | 1 | 0 | 0 | 0 | 1 | 0 |
| 8 | (South Korea) | FW | Han Geon-yong | 2 | 0 | 0 | 0 | 2 | 0 |
| 9 | (South Korea) | MF | Chang Hyuk-jin | 5 | 0 | 0 | 0 | 5 | 0 |
| 10 | (Uzbekistan) | FW | Bahodir Nasimov | 3 | 0 | 0 | 0 | 3 | 0 |
| 11 | (South Korea) | MF | Hong Dong-hyun | 2 | 0 | 0 | 0 | 2 | 0 |
| 13 | (South Korea) | DF | Kang Tae-wook | 1 | 0 | 1 | 0 | 2 | 0 |
| 14 | (Uruguay) | FW | Raúl Tarragona | 6 | 0 | 0 | 0 | 6 | 0 |
| 15 | (South Korea) | MF | Jeong Hyeon-sik | 4 | 0 | 0 | 0 | 4 | 0 |
| 16 | (South Korea) | DF | Yoo Yeon-seung | 7 | 1 | 0 | 0 | 7 | 1 |
| 17 | (South Korea) | FW | Lee Geon | 8 | 0 | 0 | 0 | 8 | 0 |
| 18 | (South Korea) | MF | Jung Kyung-ho | 2 | 0 | 0 | 0 | 2 | 0 |
| 19 | (South Korea) | MF | Park Gyeong-ik | 1 | 0 | 0 | 0 | 1 | 0 |
| 20 | (South Korea) | DF | Lee In-jae | 3 | 0 | 0 | 0 | 3 | 0 |
| 23 | (South Korea) | DF | Oh Yoon-seok | 1 | 0 | 0 | 0 | 1 | 0 |
| 24 | (South Korea) | FW | Kwak Seong-chan | 1 | 0 | 0 | 0 | 1 | 0 |
| 26 | (South Korea) | MF | Kim Min-sung | 1 | 0 | 0 | 0 | 1 | 0 |
| 30 | (South Korea) | DF | Ryu Hyeon-jin | 2 | 0 | 1 | 0 | 3 | 0 |
| 45 | (Montenegro) | FW | Luka Rotković | 2 | 0 | 0 | 0 | 2 | 0 |
| 77 | (South Korea) | MF | Jo Woo-jin | 1 | 0 | 0 | 0 | 1 | 0 |
| | | | TOTALS | 72 | 3 | 2 | 0 | 74 | 3 |
