= 2025 Pohang Steelers season =

Pohang Steelers
2025 season
- Chairman: Shin Young-gwon
- Manager: Park Tae-ha
- K League 1: 4th
- Korea Cup: Round of 16
- Champions League Elite: League stage
- Champions League Two: TBD
- Top goalscorer: League: Lee Ho-jae (13 goals); All: Lee Ho-jae (16 goals)
- Average home league attendance: 10,248
- Biggest win: Daejeon Hana Citizen 1–3 Pohang Steelers (27 May 2025); Pohang Steelers 3–1 Jeonbuk Hyundai Motors (24 August 2025)
- Biggest defeat: Pohang Steelers 0–4 (Japan) Kawasaki Frontale (11 February 2025); Pohang Steelers 1–5 Suwon FC (22 July 2025)
Home colours	Away colours

The 2025 season is Pohang Steelers' 43rd season in the K League 1 in South Korea. Pohang Steelers competed in the K League 1, Korea Cup, and the 2025–26 AFC Champions League Two after winning the 2024 Korean FA Cup but did not finished the league in fourth place or higher in the 2024 K League 1.

== Players ==
No.	Player	Nationality	Date of birth (age)	Previous club	Contract since	Contract end
Goalkeepers
1	Yoon Pyeong-gook	(South Korea)	8 February 1992 (age 34)	(South Korea) Gwangju	2022	2025
21	Hwang In-jae	(South Korea)	22 April 1994 (age 32)	(South Korea) Gimcheon Sangmu	2020	
91	Kwon Neung	(South Korea)	13 October 2005 (age 21)	(South Korea) Boin High School	2024	
Defenders
2	Eo Jeong-won	(South Korea)	8 July 1999 (age 27)	(South Korea) Busan IPark	2024	
3	Lee Dong-hee	(South Korea)	7 February 2000 (age 26)	(South Korea) Bucheon	2024	2026
5	Jonathan Aspropotamitis	(Australia) (Greece)	7 June 1996 (age 30)	(Australia) Macarthur	2024	
13	Kang Min-jun	(South Korea)	8 April 2003 (age 23)	(South Korea) Korea University	2025	
14	Park Seung-wook	(South Korea)	7 May 1997 (age 29)	(South Korea) Gimcheon Sangmu	2021	
17	Shin Kwang-hoon	(South Korea)	18 March 1987 (age 39)	(South Korea) Gangwon	2021	2025
23	Lee Dong-hyeop	(South Korea)	12 March 2003 (age 23)	(South Korea) Kwangwoon University	2024	
24	Han Hyeon-seo	(South Korea)	2 January 2004 (age 22)	(South Korea) Tongmyong University	2025	
25	Cha Jun-young	(South Korea)	10 May 2004 (age 22)	(South Korea) Jungwon University	2025	
26	Park Chan-yong	(South Korea)	27 January 1996 (age 30)	(South Korea) Gimcheon Sangmu	2022	
33	Jo Sung-Wook	(South Korea)	22 March 1995 (age 31)	(South Korea) Seongnam FC	2025	
66	Lee Chang-woo	(South Korea)	12 March 2006 (age 20)	Youth Team	2025	
Midfielders
4	Jeon Min-gwang	(South Korea)	17 January 1993 (age 33)	(South Korea) Goyang Citizen	2019	
6	Kim Jong-woo	(South Korea)	1 October 1993 (age 33)	(South Korea) Gwangju	2019	2025
8	Oberdan	(Brazil)	3 July 1995 (age 31)	(Brazil) Figueirense	2024	2026
10	Baek Sung-dong	(South Korea)	13 August 1991 (age 35)	(South Korea) FC Anyang	2023	2025
12	Cho Jae-hun	(South Korea)	29 June 2003 (age 23)	(South Korea) Jeonnam Dragons	2022	
16	Han Chan-hee	(South Korea)	17 March 1997 (age 29)	(South Korea) Gimcheon Sangmu	2023	2025
22	Hong Ji-woo	(South Korea)	17 April 2003 (age 23)	(South Korea) Tongmyong University	2025	
28	Kim Jun-ho	(South Korea)	11 December 2002 (age 23)	Youth Team	2024	
40	Ki Sung-yueng	(South Korea)	24 January 1989 (age 37)	(South Korea) FC Seoul	2025	
70	Hwang Seo-woong	(South Korea)	22 January 2005 (age 21)	Youth Team	2024	
77	Wanderson	(Brazil)	3 July 1995 (age 31)	(United Arab Emirates) Al-Ittihad Kalba	2022	2026
88	Kim Dong-jin	(South Korea)	30 July 2003 (age 23)	(South Korea) Hannam University	2024	
90	Kim Dong-min	(South Korea)	22 February 2005 (age 21)	Youth Team	2021	
Forwards
7	Kim In-sung	(South Korea)	9 September 1989 (age 37)	(South Korea) Seoul E-Land	2023	2025
9	Jorge Luiz	(Brazil)	21 June 1999 (age 27)	(Portugal) Feirense	2024	
11	Juninho Rocha	(Brazil)	5 November 1997 (age 28)	(South Korea) Chungnam Asan	2025	2025
15	Lee Kyu-min	(South Korea)	28 September 2005 (age 21)	(South Korea) Pyeongtaek Jinwee	2024	
18	Kang Hyeon-Je	(South Korea)	31 August 2002 (age 24)	(South Korea) Sangji University	2023	2025
19	Lee Ho-jae	(South Korea)	14 October 2000 (age 26)	(South Korea) Korea University	2021	2025
20	An Jae-joon	(South Korea)	13 April 2001 (age 25)	(South Korea) Bucheon	2024	
27	Park Su-been	(South Korea)	27 August 2005 (age 21)	(Spain) CD Leganés B	2024	
30	Baek Seung-won	(South Korea)	15 December 2006 (age 19)	Youth Team	2025	
44	Lee Heon-jae	(South Korea)	23 March 2006 (age 20)	Youth Team	2025	
99	Cho Sang-hyeok	(South Korea)	23 January 2004 (age 22)	(South Korea) Ajou University	2025	
Players who went out on loan during season
37	Hong Yun-sang	(South Korea)	19 March 2002 (age 24)	(Germany) 1. FC Nürnberg II	2023	
	Kim Seo-jin	(South Korea)	7 January 2005 (age 21)	(South Korea) Cheonan City	2024	
Players who left mid-season
26	Lee Tae-seok	(South Korea)	28 July 2002 (age 24)	(South Korea) FC Seoul	2024	
34	Lee Gyu-baeg	(South Korea)	10 February 2004 (age 22)	Youth Team	2022	
47	Kim Beom-su	(South Korea)	8 April 2000 (age 26)	(South Korea) Ansan Greeners FC	2025	

== Transfers ==
=== Pre-season ===
==== In ====
Transfers in

Date	Position	Player	Transferred From	Ref
Permanent Transfer
31 December 2024	DF	(South Korea) Cho Jae-hun	(South Korea) Jeonnam Dragons	End of loan
31 December 2024	DF	(South Korea) Kim Ryun-sung	(South Korea) Busan IPark	End of loan
31 December 2024	MF	(South Korea) Kim Jung-hyun	(South Korea) Chungbuk Cheongju	End of loan
31 December 2024	MF	(South Korea) Kim Seo-jin	(South Korea) Cheonan City	End of loan
31 December 2024	FW	(South Korea) Yoon Jae-Woon	(South Korea) Bucheon	End of loan
17 January 2025	FW	(Brazil) Juninho Rocha	(South Korea) Chungnam Asan	Undiclosed
Loan Transfer
18 March 2025	DF	(South Korea) Jo Sung-Wook	(South Korea) Seongnam FC	Season loan

==== Out ====
Transfers out

Date	Position	Player	Transferred To	Ref
Permanent Transfer
19 July 2024	MF	(South Korea) Kim Seo-jin	(South Korea) Cheonan City	End of loan
1 January 2025	DF	(South Korea) Kang Seong-hyeok	(South Korea) Seoul Jungnang	Free
1 January 2025	MF	(South Korea) Kim Gyu-hyeong	(South Korea)	Free
4 January 2025	MF	(South Korea) Kim Jung-hyun	(South Korea) Chungnam Asan	Free
17 January 2025	DF	(South Korea) Lee Gyu-baeg	(South Korea) Gyeongnam	Free
17 January 2025	DF	(South Korea) Kim Ryun-sung	(South Korea) Jeju SK	Free
17 January 2025	DF	(South Korea) Choi Hyeon-woong	(South Korea) Chungnam Asan	Free
17 January 2025	MF	(South Korea) Yoon Min-Ho	(South Korea) Jeonnam Dragons	Free
17 January 2025	MF	(South Korea) Min Sang-gi	(South Korea) Gwangju	Free
17 January 2025	MF	(South Korea) Yun Suk-ju	(South Korea) Seoul E-land	Free
17 January 2025	FW	(South Korea) Park Hyeong-woo	(South Korea) Ansan Greeners	Free
17 January 2025	FW	(South Korea) Jeong Jae-hee	(South Korea) Daejeon Hana Citizen	Free
17 January 2025	FW	(South Korea) Yoon Jae-woon	(South Korea) Gimpo FC	Free
23 January 2025	FW	(South Korea) Kim Myung-jun	(Belgium) Genk	Free
19 February 2025	MF	(South Korea) Jo Seong-joon	(South Korea) Gimpo FC	Free
4 March 2025	FW	(South Korea) Heo Yong-joon	(South Korea) Seoul E-Land	Free
Loan Transfer
4 December 2023	DF	(South Korea) Park Seung-wook	(South Korea) Gimcheon Sangmu	Military Service
8 January 2024	FW	(South Korea) Park Su-been	(Spain) CD Leganés B	Season loan until June 2025
29 April 2024	MF	(South Korea) Kim Jun-ho	(South Korea) Gimcheon Sangmu FC	Military Service
17 January 2025	GK	(South Korea) Lee Seung-Hwan	(South Korea) Chungbuk Cheongju	Season loan
6 February 2025	MF	(South Korea) Paik Sang-hoon	(South Korea) Dangjin Citizen	Season loan
18 March 2025	FW	(South Korea) Kim Beom-su	(South Korea) Seongnam	Season loan

=== Mid-season ===
==== In ====
Transfers in

Date	Position	Player	Transferred From	Ref
Permanent Transfer
31 May 2025	FW	(South Korea) Park Su-been	(Spain) CD Leganés B	End of loan
3 June 2025	DF	(South Korea) Park Seung-wook	(South Korea) Gimcheon Sangmu FC	End of Military Service
3 July 2025	MF	(South Korea) Ki Sung-yueng	(South Korea) FC Seoul	Undisclosed
28 October 2025	DF	(South Korea) Park Chan-yong	(South Korea) Gimcheon Sangmu FC	End of Military Service
28 October 2025	MF	(South Korea) Kim Jun-ho	(South Korea) Gimcheon Sangmu FC	End of Military Service

==== Out ====
Transfers out

Date	Position	Player	Transferred To	Ref
Permanent Transfer
2 August 2025	DF	(South Korea) Lee Tae-seok	Austria Wien	
Loan Transfer
17 November 2025	MF	(South Korea) Kim Seo-jin	(South Korea) Gimcheon Sangmu FC	Military Service
17 November 2025	FW	(South Korea) Hong Yun-sang	(South Korea) Gimcheon Sangmu FC	Military Service

== Friendly matches ==
Win Draw Loss

=== Tour of Thailand (5 Jan – 23 Jan) ===
18 January 2025 1	(South Korea) Pohang Steelers	5–0	(South Korea) Yonsei University	Hua Hin, Thailand

22 January 2025 2	(South Korea) Pohang Steelers	4–1	(South Korea) Yonsei University	Hua Hin, Thailand

22 January 2025 3	(South Korea) Pohang Steelers	8–0	(Thailand) Hua Hin City F.C.	Hua Hin, Thailand

=== Others ===
31 January 2025 1	(South Korea) Pohang Steelers	3–1	(China) Yanbian Longding	Jeju, Korea

31 January 2025 2	(South Korea) Pohang Steelers	2–2	(South Korea) Gimpo FC	Jeju, Korea

3 February 2025 3	(South Korea) Pohang Steelers	2–1	(South Korea) Gangneung FC	Jeju, Korea

3 February 2025 4	(South Korea) Pohang Steelers	1–1	(South Korea) Gimpo FC	Jeju, Korea

6 February 2025 5	(South Korea) Pohang Steelers	1–1	(South Korea) KHNP FC	Jeju, Korea

== Competitions ==
=== Overall record ===
Competition	First match	Last match	Starting round	Final position	Record							
Competition	First match	Last match	Starting round	Final position	Pld	W	D	L	GF	GA	GD	Win %
K League 1	15 February	30 November	Matchday 1	4th	38	16	8	14	41	46	−5	42.11
Korea Cup	14 May	14 May	Round of 16	Round of 16	1	0	0	1	1	2	−1	0.00
ACLE	11 February	18 February	League stage	League stage	2	0	0	2	2	9	−7	0.00
ACL 2	18 September	11 December	Group stage	TBD	6	4	1	1	7	2	+5	66.67
Total					47	20	9	18	51	59	−8	42.55

Source: Soccerway

=== K League 1 ===
==== Matches ====
As usual, the league season is played over 38 matches. After 33 league matches between the 12 participating teams, the teams are split into the final round (top 6 teams) and relegation round (bottom 6 teams).

15 February 2025 1	Pohang Steelers	0–3	Daejeon Hana Citizen	Pohang
		Report	Choi Geon-ju 32'; Joo Min-kyu 87', 90'; Kang Yoon-seong (yellow card) 49'; Choi Geon-ju (yellow card) 71'; Kim In-Gyun (yellow card) 90+5'	Stadium: Pohang Steel Yard; Attendance: 10,519; Referee: Lee Dong-Jun

23 February 2025 2	Gangwon FC	2–1	Pohang Steelers	Chuncheon
	Lee Ji-Ho 82', 90+3'; Lee Sang-heon (yellow card) 65'	Report	Lee Ho-jae 44'; Hong Yun-sang (yellow card) 37'; Oberdan (yellow card) 85'	Stadium: Chuncheon Songam Sports Town; Attendance: 6,539; Referee: Song Min-seok

1 March 2025 3	Pohang Steelers	0–0	Daegu FC	Pohang
	Lee Dong-Hee (yellow card) 65'	Report	Cesinha (yellow card) 22'; Edgar (yellow card) 80'; Lee Chan-dong (yellow card) 90+4'; Oh Seung-hoon (yellow card) 90+6'	Stadium: Pohang Steel Yard; Attendance: 11,207; Referee: Kim Yong-woo

22 March 2025 4 (Rescheduled)	Gwangju FC	2–3	Pohang Steelers	Gwangju
	Seong-Gwon Cho 7'; Reis 90+2'; Lee Min-ki (yellow card) 23'; Kyoung Rok Choi (yellow card) 63'; Bruno de Oliveira (yellow card) 78'; Ha Seung-un (yellow card) 83'; Kim Jong-woo (yellow card) 90+11'	Report	Oberdan 22'; Lee Ho-jae 68' (pen.); Kang Hyeon-Je 90+11'; Eo Jeong-won (yellow card) 90+9'	Stadium: Gwangju Football Stadium; Attendance: 4,544; Referee: Park Byeong-jin

16 March 2025 5	Jeonbuk Hyundai Motors	2–2	Pohang Steelers	Jeonju
	Jeon Jin-woo 25' (yellow card) 73'; Bak Jae-yong 30'; Han Kook-young (red card) 53'	Report	Lee Tae-seok 51'; Cho Sang-hyeok 84'; Jorge Luiz (yellow card) 81'	Stadium: Jeonju World Cup Stadium; Attendance: 10,442; Referee: Ko Hyung-jin

29 March 2025 6	Pohang Steelers	1–0	Ulsan HD	Pohang
	Lee Ho-jae 80'; Han Hyeon-Seo (yellow card) 90'	Report		Stadium: Pohang Steel Yard; Attendance: 12,565; Referee: Kim Dae-young

5 April 2025 7	Suwon FC	1–1	Pohang Steelers	Suwon
	Pablo Sabbag 13'; Lee Ji-sol (yellow card) 74'	Report	Oberdan 50' (yellow card) 8'; Han Chan-hee (yellow card) 89'	Stadium: Suwon Sports Complex; Attendance: 2,924; Referee: Kim Chong-hyuk

12 April 2025 8	Pohang Steelers	2–1	FC Anyang	Pohang
	Cho Sang-hyeok 60'; Lee Ho-jae 75'; Shin Kwang-Hoon (yellow card) 37'; Jorge Luiz (yellow card) 90+1'	Report	Bruno Rodrigues Mota 19' (pen.); Chae Hyun-Woo (yellow card) 23'; Kim Jeong-hyun (yellow card) 57'; Kim Young-chan (yellow card) 71'; Thomas Oude Kotte (yellow card) 87'	Stadium: Pohang Steel Yard; Attendance: 8,354; Referee: Park Byung-jin

20 April 2025 9	Jeju SK	2–0	Pohang Steelers	Seogwipo
	Kim Jun-Ha 3' (yellow card) 38'; Nam Tae-hee 78' (yellow card) 79'; Lim Chai-min (yellow card) 28'	Report		Stadium: Jeju World Cup Stadium; Attendance: 5,531; Referee: Kim Yong-woo

27 April 2025 10	Pohang Steelers	1–0	FC Seoul	Pohang
	Oberdan 7'; Hong Yun-sang (yellow card) 90+7'	Report	Jesse Lingard (yellow card) 40'; Lee Tae-seok (yellow card) 60'; Yazan Al-Arab (yellow card) 68'; Kim Jin-su (yellow card) 90+4'	Stadium: Pohang Steel Yard; Attendance: 10,984; Referee: Kim Dae-young

2 May 2025 11	Pohang Steelers	1–2	Gimcheon Sangmu FC	Pohang
	Oberdan 76'; Juninho Rocha (yellow card) 38'	Report	Park Sang-Hyeok 73', 90+6'; Park Seung-wook (yellow card) 45'; Kim Dong-Heon (yellow card) 90+7'	Stadium: Pohang Steel Yard; Attendance: 7,405; Referee: Lee Dong-Jun

5 May 2025 12	Ulsan HD	1–1	Pohang Steelers	Ulsan
	Darijan Bojanić 45+3'; Park Min-Seo (yellow card) 41'; Yoon Jae-seok (yellow card) 58'	Report	Oberdan 8'; Juninho Rocha (penalty missed) 90+8	Stadium: Ulsan Munsu Football Stadium; Attendance: 23,442; Referee: Kim Chong-hyuk

10 May 2025 13	Pohang Steelers	2–0	Suwon FC	Pohang
	Lee Ho-jae 42' (pen.), 46'; Lee Tae-seok (yellow card) 23'; Jeon Min-gwang (yellow card) 32'	Report	Choi Kyu-baek (yellow card) 90+2'	Stadium: Pohang Steel Yard; Attendance: 8,811; Referee: Kim Yong-woo

18 May 2025 14	Pohang Steelers	0–1	Gwangju FC	Pohang
	Jeon Min-gwang (yellow card) 22'; Jorge Luiz (yellow card) 39'; Lee Tae-seok (yellow card) 62'	Report	Park In-Hyeok 90'; Jasir Asani (penalty missed) 45+6; Jung Ji-Hun (yellow card) 15'; Cho Seong-Gwon (yellow card) 30'; Jeon Min-gwang (yellow card) 22'	Stadium: Pohang Steel Yard; Attendance: 9,819; Referee: Kim Dae-young

23 May 2025 15	FC Anyang	0–2	Pohang Steelers	Anyang
	Lee Tae-hee (yellow card) 40'	Report	Eo Jeong-won 53'; Kim In-sung 60'	Stadium: Anyang Stadium; Attendance: 6,124; Referee: Park Byeong-jin

27 May 2025 16	Daejeon Hana Citizen	1–3	Pohang Steelers	Daejeon
	Joo Min-kyu 14'; Lee Jun-Gyu (yellow card) 76'	Report	Lee Ho-jae 33'; Jorge Luiz 37'; Kim In-sung 72'; Shin Kwang-Hoon (yellow card) 31'	Stadium: Daejeon World Cup Stadium; Attendance: 5,833; Referee: Choi Kwang-ho

1 June 2025 17	Pohang Steelers	2–1	Gangwon FC	Pohang
	Jorge Luiz 45+3'; Lee Ho-jae 69' (yellow card) 90+6'	Report	Vitor Gabriel 11'; Park Ho-young (yellow card) 84'	Stadium: Pohang Steel Yard; Attendance: 8,944; Referee: Kim Hee-gon

14 June 2025 18	Gimcheon Sangmu FC	1–0	Pohang Steelers	Gimcheon
	Lee Dong-jun 29'; Lee Ju-hyun (yellow card) 77'	Report		Stadium: Gimcheon Stadium; Attendance: 2,681; Referee: Chae Sang-hyeop

17 June 2025 19	Daegu FC	1–1	Pohang Steelers	Daegu
	Edgar 83'; Park Jin-Young (yellow card) 47'; Kwon Tae-Young (yellow card) 84'	Report	Oberdan 32'; Kim In-sung (yellow card) 70'; Eo Jeong-won (yellow card) 72'	Stadium: DGB Daegu Bank Park; Attendance: 9,384; Referee: Shin Yong-jun

21 June 2025 20	Pohang Steelers	2–1	Jeju SK	Pohang
	Jorge Luiz 63'; Kim In-sung 90+1'; Lee Tae-seok (yellow card) 61'; Park Seung-wook (yellow card) 89'	Report	Chung Woon (yellow card) 45+2'; Nam Tae-hee 90+8' (yellow card) 87'; Lim Chai-min (yellow card) 90+10'	Stadium: Pohang Steel Yard; Attendance: 6,204; Referee: Kim Woo-sung

29 June 2025 21	FC Seoul	4–1	Pohang Steelers	Seoul
	Jesse Lingard 17'; Lucas Rodrigues 33'; Marko Dugandžić 45+4' (yellow card) 45+3'; Patryk Klimala 85'; Kim Ju-sung (yellow card) 14'	Report	Lee Dong-Hee 75'; Oberdan (red card) 29'	Stadium: Seoul World Cup Stadium; Attendance: 20,036; Referee: Kim Chong-hyuk

19 July 2025 22	Pohang Steelers	2–3	Jeonbuk Hyundai Motors	Pohang
	Hong Yun-sang 32'; Lee Ho-jae 44'; Eo Jeong-won (yellow card) 28'; Lee Dong-Hee (yellow card) 79'	Report	Lee Seung-woo 65'; Tiago Orobó 80' (yellow card) 80'; Hong Jeong-Ho 90+7'; Jeon Jin-woo (yellow card) 29'; Song Min-kyu (yellow card) 34'; Kim Tae-hwan (yellow card) 87'	Stadium: Pohang Steel Yard; Attendance: 13,973; Referee: Lee Dong-jun

22 July 2025 23	Pohang Steelers	1–5	Suwon FC	Pohang
	Hong Yun-sang 41'; Jeon Min-gwang (yellow card) 51'; Kim Dong-jin (red card) 63'	Report	Lee Ji-sol 19'; Pablo Sabbag 39'; Willyan 65', 79'; Ahn Hyeon-beom 83'	Stadium: Pohang Steel Yard; Attendance: 8,260; Referee: Kim Yong-woo

27 July 2025 24	Daegu FC	0–1	Pohang Steelers	Daegu
	Lim Jin-Hyuk (yellow card) 67'; Jo Jin-woo (yellow card) 90+7'	Report	Lee Ho-jae 68' (pen.) (yellow card) 85'	Stadium: DGB Daegu Bank Park; Attendance: 10,153; Referee: Lee Dong-jun

10 August 2025 25	Pohang Steelers	1–0	Gwangju FC	Pohang
	Hong Yun-sang 45+3'; Chang-Woo Lee (yellow card) 54'; Hwang In-jae (yellow card) 90+5'	Report	Isnairo Reis Silva Morais (yellow card) 4'; Jun-Soo Byeon (yellow card) 30'; Kang-hyun Lee (yellow card) 43'	Stadium: Pohang Steel Yard; Attendance: 10,020; Referee: Song Min-seok

15 August 2025 26	FC Anyang	0–1	Pohang Steelers	Anyang
	Ivan Jukić (yellow card) 82'; Kwon Kyung-won (red card) 86'	Report	Lee Ho-jae 6' (yellow card) 45+5'; Kang Min-jun (yellow card) 12'; Kim Dong-jun (yellow card) 19'	Stadium: Anyang Stadium; Attendance: 8,122; Referee: Kim Jong-hyuk

24 August 2025 27	Pohang Steelers	3–1	Jeonbuk Hyundai Motors	Pohang
	Jorge Luiz 1', 45' (pen.); Park Seung-wook 24'; Juninho Rocha (yellow card) 60'; Kim In-sung (yellow card) 90+5'	Report	Tiago Orobó 16' (pen.) (yellow card) 30'; Kim Tae-Hyun (yellow card) 44'; Kim Young-bin (yellow card) 70'	Stadium: Pohang Steel Yard; Attendance: 11,582; Referee: Park Byung-jin

31 August 2025 28	Gangwon FC	1–0	Pohang Steelers	Chuncheon
	Mo Jae-hyeon 40'; Lee Ki-hyuk (yellow card) 85'	Report	Kang Min-Jun (yellow card) 29'	Stadium: Chuncheon Songam Sports Town; Attendance: 8,505; Referee: Song Min-Seok

13 September 2025 29	Pohang Steelers	1–1	Ulsan HD	Pohang
	Lee Ho-jae 41'; Oberdan (yellow card) 32'; Shin Kwang-Hoon (yellow card) 43'	Report	Heo Yool 44'; Kim Young-gwon (yellow card) 86'	Stadium: Pohang Steel Yard; Attendance: 14,166; Referee: Kim Yong-woo

21 September 2025 30	Pohang Steelers	1–0	Jeju SK	Pohang
	Lee Ho-jae 56'; Won Ki-jong 86'; Shin Kwang-Hoon (yellow card) 15'	Report	Lee Chang-min (yellow card) 84'	Stadium: Pohang Steel Yard; Attendance: 9,014; Referee: Lee Dong-jun

27 September 2025 31	Gimcheon Sangmu FC	2–0	Pohang Steelers	Gimcheon
	Lee Dong-gyeong 61'	Report	Shin Kwang-Hoon (yellow card) 37'; Lee Dong Hee (red card) 42'; Lee Ho-jae (yellow card) 45+2'	Stadium: Gimcheon Stadium; Attendance: 3,634; Referee: Kim Woo-sung

5 October 2025 32	Pohang Steelers	1–3	Daejeon Hana Citizen	Pohang
	Lee Ho-jae 35' (pen.); Kang Min-jun (yellow card) 25'	Report	Masatoshi Ishida 2', 52'; Hernandes Rodrigues 60'; Kim Moon-hwan (yellow card) 40'; Joo Min-kyu (yellow card) 43'; Anton Kryvotsyuk (yellow card) 45+4'; Ha Chang-Rae (yellow card) 81'	Stadium: Pohang Steel Yard; Attendance: 11,821; Referee: Ko Hyung-jin

18 October 2025 33	FC Seoul	1–2	Pohang Steelers	Seoul
	Cho Young-wook 68'; Anderson (yellow card) 75'; Jesse Lingard (yellow card) 82'	Report	Lee Ho-jae 29' (yellow card) 59'; Juninho Rocha 85' (yellow card) 90+2'; Lee Han-do (yellow card) 45+2'; Shin Kwang-Hoon (yellow card) 82'; Oberdan (yellow card) 90'	Stadium: Seoul World Cup Stadium; Attendance: 23,672; Referee: Shin Yong-jun

26 October 2025 34	Daejeon Hana Citizen	2–0	Pohang Steelers	Daejeon
	Lee Myung-jae 27'; Joo Min-kyu 45' (pen.); Kim Min-deok (yellow card) 34'	Report	Ki Sung-yueng (yellow card) 35'; Shin Kwang-Hoon (yellow card) 44'; Jeon Min-gwang (yellow card) 45+6'; Eo Jeong-won (yellow card) 81'; Park Seung-wook (yellow card) 87'	Stadium: Daejeon World Cup Stadium; Attendance: 8,275; Referee: Kim Dae-yong

1 November 2025 35	Gimcheon Sangmu FC	0–1	Pohang Steelers	Gimcheon
	Lee Chan-wook (yellow card) 57'; Park Tae-jun (yellow card) 70'	Report	Juninho Rocha 71'	Stadium: Gimcheon Stadium; Attendance: 2,147; Referee: Kim Hee-gon

9 November 2025 36	Pohang Steelers	0–0	FC Seoul	Pohang
		Report		Stadium: Pohang Steel Yard; Attendance: 10,493; Referee: Chae Sang-hyeop

22 November 2025 37	Pohang Steelers	0–0	Jeonbuk Hyundai Motors	Pohang
	Juninho Rocha (yellow card) 87'	Report		Stadium: Pohang Steel Yard; Attendance: 10,572; Referee: Park Byung-jin

30 November 2025 38	Gangwon FC	1–0	Pohang Steelers	Chuncheon
	Mo Jae-hyeon 61'; Lee Ki-hyuk (yellow card) 37'; Park Chung-hyo (yellow card) 90'; Hong Chul (yellow card) 90+5'	Report	Lee Ho-jae (penalty missed) 34; Kang Min-Jun (yellow card) 43'; Park Chan-yong (yellow card) 71'	Stadium: Chuncheon Songam Sports Town; Attendance: 6,524; Referee: Kim Woo-sung

Pos	Team	Pld	W	D	L	GF	GA	GD	Pts	Qualification or relegation (Note: Teams played each other three times (33 matches), before the league was split into two groups, the top six and the bottom six.)
2	Daejeon Hana Citizen	38	18	11	9	58	46	+12	65	Qualification for Champions League Elite league stage
3	Gimcheon Sangmu (Note: Military-owned team Gimcheon Sangmu cannot qualify for AFC competitions.)	38	18	7	13	59	45	+14	61	
4	Pohang Steelers	38	16	8	14	41	46	−5	56	Qualification for Champions League Elite league stage
5	Gangwon FC	38	13	13	12	37	41	−4	52	Qualification for Champions League Elite preliminary stage
6	FC Seoul	38	12	13	13	50	52	−2	49	Qualification for Champions League Two group stage

Source: Soccerway K League
Rules for classification: 1) Points; 2) Goals scored; 3) Goal difference; 4) Wins; 5) Head-to-head points

=== Korean FA Cup ===
14 May 2025 Round of 16	(K2) Gimpo FC	2–1	Pohang Steelers	Gimpo
	Ahn Chang-min 1'; Connor Chapman 39'; Djalma (yellow card) 59'; Jae-Woon Yoon (yellow card) 73'; Jegal Jae-min (red card) 90+10'		Eo Jeong-won 11' (red card) 90+10'; Jonathan Aspropotamitis (yellow card) 64'	Stadium: Gimpo Solteo Football Field

=== 2024–25 AFC Champions League Elite ===
==== League stage ====
Pos	Team	Pld	W	D	L	GF	GA	GD	Pts	Qualification
7	(China) Shanghai Shenhua	8	3	1	4	13	12	+1	10	Advance to round of 16
8	(China) Shanghai Port	8	2	2	4	10	18	−8	8	Advance to round of 16
9	(South Korea) Pohang Steelers	7	2	0	5	9	17	−8	6	
10	(South Korea) Ulsan HD	7	1	0	6	4	16	−12	3	
11	(Australia) Central Coast Mariners	7	0	1	6	8	18	−10	1	

Source: Asian Football Confederation
Rules for classification: 1) points; 2) goal difference; 3) number of goals scored; 4) number of matches won; 5) penalty shoot-out if only two teams remain tied and played each other on the final matchday 6) fair play ranking; 7) drawing of lots

Win Draw Loss

11 February 2025 Matchday 7	Pohang Steelers (South Korea)	0–4	(Japan) Kawasaki Frontale	Pohang, South Korea
19:00 UTC+9	Oberdan (yellow card) 9'; Jonathan Aspropotamitis (yellow card) 28' (yellow-red card) 43'; Lee Dong-hee (yellow card) 90'	Report	Shin Yamada 38'; Yasuto Wakizaka 71'; So Kawahara 74'; Erison 88'; Kento Tachibanada (yellow card) 31'	Stadium: Pohang Steel Yard; Attendance: 4,007; Referee: Nazmi Nasaruddin (Malaysia)

18 February 2025 Matchday 8	Johor Darul Ta'zim (Malaysia)	5–2	(South Korea) Pohang Steelers	Johor, Malaysia
	Óscar Arribas 37'; Bergson 52' (yellow card) 59'; Arif Aiman 56'; Jesé 90+7'; Jorge Obregón 90+13' (pen.); Afiq Fazail (yellow card) 76'	Report	Lee Ho-jae 27'; Kang Hyeon-Je 80' (yellow card) 90+8'	Stadium: Sultan Ibrahim Stadium; Attendance: 34,590; Referee: Adham Makhadmeh (Jordan)

=== 2025–26 AFC Champions League Two ===
==== Group stage ====
Pos	Team	Pld	W	D	L	GF	GA	GD	Pts	Qualification	BGT	PHS	BGP	KAY
1	(Singapore) Tampines Rovers	6	5	1	0	14	5	+9	16	Advance to round of 16	—	1–0	2–1	5–3
2	(South Korea) Pohang Steelers	6	4	1	1	7	2	+5	13	Advance to round of 16	1–1	—	2–0	2–0
3	(Thailand) BG Pathum United	6	2	0	4	5	8	−3	6		0–2	0–1	—	2–1
4	(Philippines) Kaya–Iloilo	6	0	0	6	4	15	−11	0		0–3	0–1	0–2	—

Source: ACL2
Rules for classification: Tiebreakers

18 September 2025 1	BG Pathum United (Thailand)	0–1	(South Korea) Pohang Steelers	Pathum Thani, Thailand
	Surachat Sareepim (yellow card) 60'	Report	Lee Dong-hyeop 41'; Jonathan Aspropotamitis (yellow card) 21'	Stadium: True BG Stadium; Attendance: 5,185; Referee: Ahmed Eisa Darwish (United Arab Emirates)

2 October 2025 2	Pohang Steelers (South Korea)	2–0	(Philippines) Kaya–Iloilo	Pohang, South Korea
	Kaishu Yamazaki 82' (o.g.); Hwang Seo-woong 90+3'	Report	Fitch Arboleda (yellow card) 71'	Stadium: Pohang Steel Yard; Attendance: 4,781; Referee: Wang Di (China)

23 October 2025 3	BG Tampines Rovers (Singapore)	1–0	(South Korea) Pohang Steelers	Bishan, Singapore
	Hide Higashikawa 1'; Tallo Ngao (yellow card) 90+1'	Report	Jonathan Aspropotamitis (yellow card) 17'; Hwang Seo-woong (yellow card) 52'; Lee Dong-hee (yellow card) 65'; Cho Sang-hyeok (yellow card) 90+3'	Stadium: Bishan Stadium; Attendance: 887; Referee: Zaid Thamer Mohammed (Iraq)

6 November 2025 4	Pohang Steelers (South Korea)	1–1	(Singapore) BG Tampines Rovers	Pohang, South Korea
	Cho Sang-hyeok 85'; Kim Dong-jin (yellow card) 39'; Cho Jae-hun (yellow card) 83'		Glenn Kweh 56'; Irfan Najeeb (yellow card) 42'; Tallo Ngao (yellow card) 90+5'	Stadium: Pohang Steel Yard; Attendance: 2,523; Referee: Akaml Buriev (Tajikistan)

27 November 2025 5	Pohang Steelers (South Korea)	2–0	(Thailand) BG Pathum United	Pohang, South Korea
	Lee Ho-jae 43', 54'; Shin Kwang-Hoon (yellow card) 25'; Jorge Luiz (yellow card) 37'; Park Seung-Wook (yellow card) 80'; Cho Sang-Hyeok (yellow card) 86'			Stadium: Pohang Steel Yard; Attendance: 3,027; Referee: Payam Heydari (Iran)

11 December 2025 6	Kaya–Iloilo (Philippines)	0–1	(South Korea) Pohang Steelers	Capas, Philippines
	Fitch Arboleda (yellow card) 76'; Mike Ott (yellow card) 90+2'	Report	An Jae-joon 18'; Eo Jeong-Won (yellow card) 81'	Stadium: New Clark City Athletics Stadium; Referee: Abdulla Ali Al-Marri (Qatar)

== Team statistics ==
=== Appearances and goals ===
As of 11 Dec 25

No.	Pos.	Player	K-League		FA Cup		AFC Champions League Elite 2024/25 ACL Elite		AFC Champions League Two 2025/26 ACL Two		Total	
No.	Pos.	Player	Apps.	Goals	Apps.	Goals	Apps.	Goals	Apps.	Goals	Apps.	Goals
1	GK	(South Korea) Yoon Pyeong-gook	3	0	1	0	1	0	4	0	9	0
2	DF	(South Korea) Eo Jeong-won	30+3	1	1	1	1+1	0	2	0	38	2
3	DF	(South Korea) Lee Dong-hee	7+7	1	0	0	1+1	0	4	0	20	1
4	MF	(South Korea) Jeon Min-gwang	36+1	0	0	0	2	0	0+1	0	40	0
5	DF	(Australia) (Greece) Jonathan Aspropotamitis	3+2	0	1	0	1	0	3	0	10	0
6	MF	(South Korea) Kim Jong-woo	4+9	0	0	0	1+1	0	4	0	19	0
7	FW	(South Korea) Kim In-sung	8+24	2	0+1	0	0+1	0	2+3	0	39	2
8	MF	(Brazil) Oberdan	31	6	0	0	2	0	0+1	0	34	6
9	FW	(Brazil) Jorge Luiz	26+10	5	1	0	2	0	1+1	0	41	5
10	MF	(South Korea) Baek Sung-dong	5+3	0	0	0	0+1	0	5+1	0	15	0
11	FW	(Brazil) Juninho Rocha	20+8	2	1	0	2	0	2+1	0	34	2
12	FW	(South Korea) Cho Jae-hun	2+1	0	0	0	0	0	1+3	0	7	0
13	DF	(South Korea) Kang Min-jun	18+10	0	1	0	0	0	2	0	31	0
14	DF	(South Korea) Park Seung-wook	17+1	1	0	0	0	0	2	0	20	1
15	FW	(South Korea) Lee Kyu-min	0+1	0	0	0	0	0	0+2	0	3	0
16	MF	(South Korea) Han Chan-hee	3+6	0	1	0	1+1	0	0	0	12	0
17	DF	(South Korea) Shin Kwang-hoon	29+7	0	0	0	1	0	2+1	0	40	0
18	FW	(South Korea) Kang Hyeon-Je	2+11	1	0+1	0	0+1	1	4	0	19	2
19	FW	(South Korea) Lee Ho-jae	32+2	13	0+1	0	1+1	1	2+1	2	40	16
20	FW	(South Korea) An Jae-joon	1+5	0	0	0	0+1	0	5+1	1	13	1
21	GK	(South Korea) Hwang In-jae	33	0	0	0	1	0	2	0	36	0
22	MF	(South Korea) Hong Ji-woo	1	0	0	0	0	0	0	0	1	0
23	DF	(South Korea) Lee Dong-hyeop	1+2	0	0+1	0	0	0	3+1	1	8	1
24	DF	(South Korea) Han Hyeon-seo	16+5	0	1	0	0	0	5	0	27	0
25	DF	(South Korea) Cha Jun-young	0	0	0	0	0	0	0	0	0	0
26	DF	(South Korea) Lee Tae-seok	22+4	1	0	0	2	0	2	0	30	1
27	FW	(South Korea) Park Su-been	0+1	0	0	0	0	0	0+1	0	12	0
33	DF	(South Korea) Jo Sung-Wook	1	0	0	0	0	0	0	0	1	0
40	MF	(South Korea) Ki Sung-yueng	13+3	0	0	0	0	0	1+1	0	18	0
44	MF	(South Korea) Lee Heon-jae	0+2	0	0	0	0	0	0	0	2	0
55	DF	(South Korea) Choi Hyun-Woung	0	0	0	0	0	0	0	0	0	0
66	DF	(South Korea) Lee Chang-woo	6+5	0	0	0	0	0	3	0	14	0
70	MF	(South Korea) Hwang Seo-woong	2+10	0	0	0	0	0	1+3	1	16	1
77	MF	(Brazil) Wanderson	1+1	0	0	0	1	0	0	0	3	0
80	GK	(South Korea) Seong-Min Hong	2	0	0	0	0	0	0	0	2	0
88	MF	(South Korea) Kim Dong-jin	16+3	0	1	0	0	0	4+1	0	25	0
90	MF	(South Korea) Kim Dong-min	0	0	0	0	0	0	0+1	0	1	0
99	FW	(South Korea) Cho Sang-hyeok	3+21	2	1	0	0	0	0+6	1	31	3
Players featured on a match but left the club on-loan
37	FW	(South Korea) Hong Yun-sang	24+5	3	1	0	2	0	0	0	32	3
47	FW	(South Korea) Kim Beom-su	0	0	0	0	0+1	0	0	0	1	0
Players featured on a match but left the club mid-season permanently
34	DF	(South Korea) Lee Gyu-baeg	0+1	0	0	0	0	0	0	0	1	0
