= 2017 Hong Kong Super Series =

Tournament details
- Dates: 21–26 November
- Level: Super Series
- Total prize money: US$400,000
- Venue: Hong Kong Coliseum
- Location: Kowloon, Hong Kong

Champions
- Men's singles: (Malaysia) Lee Chong Wei
- Women's singles: (Chinese Taipei) Tai Tzu-ying
- Men's doubles: (Indonesia) Marcus Fernaldi Gideon (Indonesia) Kevin Sanjaya Sukamuljo
- Women's doubles: (China) Chen Qingchen (China) Jia Yifan
- Mixed doubles: (China) Zheng Siwei (China) Huang Yaqiong

The 2017 Hong Kong Super Series was the twelfth Super Series tournament of the 2017 BWF Super Series, taking place at the Hong Kong Coliseum in Kowloon, Hong Kong from November 21 – 26 and it had a total purse of $400,000.

== Men's singles ==
=== Seeds ===
1. (Denmark) Viktor Axelsen (withdrew)
2. (South Korea) Son Wan-ho (quarterfinals)
3. (China) Lin Dan (quarterfinals)
4. (India) Srikanth Kidambi (withdrew)
5. (China) Chen Long (final)
6. (China) Shi Yuqi (semifinals)
7. (Chinese Taipei) Chou Tien-chen (first round)
8. (Malaysia) Lee Chong Wei (champion)

=== Top half ===
First round
1	(Denmark) V Axelsen
PFQ	(Japan) K Sakai	w	/	o
(India) H. S. Prannoy	19	21	21
(Hong Kong) Hu Y	21	17	15
7	(Chinese Taipei) Chou T-c	21	20	17
(France) B Leverdez	11	22	21
(Chinese Taipei) Hsu J-h	18	10
(Denmark) A Antonsen	21	21
PFQ	(Thailand) K Phetpradab	21	21
(China) Huang YX	16	14
Q3	(India) K Parupalli	21	9	20
Q2	(South Korea) Lee D-k	15	21	22
5	(China) Chen L	21	21
(South Korea) Lee H-i	14	17
(Indonesia) J Christie	17	13
(Chinese Taipei) Wang T-w	21	21

Second round
PFQ	(Japan) K Sakai	11	21	21
(India) H. S. Prannoy	21	10	15
(France) B Leverdez	14	14
(Denmark) A Antonsen	21	21
PFQ	(Thailand) K Phetpradab	15	9
Q2	(South Korea) Lee D-k	21	21
5	(China) Chen L	21	21	21
(Chinese Taipei) Wang T-w	23	10	19

Quarterfinals
PFQ	(Japan) K Sakai	15	13
(Denmark) A Antonsen	21	21
Q2	(South Korea) Lee D-k	16	13
5	(China) Chen L	21	21

Semifinals
(Denmark) A Antonsen	14	21	17
5	(China) Chen L	21	19	21

=== Bottom half ===
First round
(Hong Kong) Wong W K	18	21	21
(Indonesia) A S Ginting	21	11	16
(Denmark) H-K Vittinghus	21	17	12
6	(China) Shi YQ	13	21	21
(Japan) K Tsuneyama	10	13
(Hong Kong) Ng K L	21	21
Q4	(Thailand) S Avihingsanon	24	11	18
3	(China) Lin D	22	21	21
PFQ	(China) Qiao B	21	16	16
Q1	(Hong Kong) Wei N	15	21	21
(China) Tian HW	9	7
8	(Malaysia) Lee C W	21	21
PFQ	(India) S Verma	15	8
(Indonesia) T Sugiarto	21	21
(India) B. S Praneeth	8	16
2	(South Korea) Son W-h	21	21

Second round
(Hong Kong) Wong W K	19	21	19
6	(China) Shi YQ	21	16	21
(Hong Kong) Ng K L	21	18	20
3	(China) Lin D	17	21	22
Q1	(Hong Kong) Wei N	23	11	12
8	(Malaysia) Lee C W	21	21	21
(Indonesia) T Sugiarto	21	16	12
2	(South Korea) Son W-h	11	21	21

Quarterfinals
6	(China) Shi YQ	13	21	21
3	(China) Lin D	21	17	15
8	(Malaysia) Lee C W	21	21
2	(South Korea) Son W-h	11	12

Semifinals
6	(China) Shi YQ	19	8
8	(Malaysia) Lee C W	21	21

=== Finals ===
Semifinals
(Denmark) Anders Antonsen	14	21	17
5	(China) Chen Long	21	19	21
6	(China) Shi Yuqi	19	8
8	(Malaysia) Lee Chong Wei	21	21

Final
5	(China) Chen Long	14	19
8	(Malaysia) Lee Chong Wei	21	21

== Women's singles ==
=== Seeds ===
1. (Chinese Taipei) Tai Tzu-ying (champion)
2. (India) P. V. Sindhu (final)
3. (South Korea) Sung Ji-hyun (semifinals)
4. (Spain) Carolina Marín (second round)
5. (Japan) Akane Yamaguchi (quarterfinals)
6. (Thailand) Ratchanok Intanon (semifinals)
7. (China) He Bingjiao (quarterfinals)
8. (China) Chen Yufei (quarterfinals)

=== Top half ===
First round
1	(Chinese Taipei) Tai T-y	21	21
(Thailand) P Chochuwong	19	14
(Hong Kong) Cheung N Y	11	21	14
(Japan) S Takahashi	21	11	21
8	(China) Chen YF	21	21
(Chinese Taipei) Chen S-y	15	13
(Denmark) M Poulsen	19	21
(India) S Nehwal	21	23
3	(South Korea) Sung J-h	21	21
(Denmark) L Kjaersfeldt	16	8
(South Korea) Lee J-m	21	15	15
(Hong Kong) Yip P Y	14	21	21
7	(China) He BJ	21	21
(United States) B Zhang	8	16
(Chinese Taipei) Chiang M-h	17	10
(Thailand) B Ongbumrungpan	21	21

Second round
1	(Chinese Taipei) Tai T-y	21	21
(Japan) S Takahashi	17	13
8	(China) Chen YF	18	21	21
(India) S Nehwal	21	19	10
3	(South Korea) Sung J-h	24	21
(Hong Kong) Yip P Y	22	11
7	(China) He BJ	21	21
(Thailand) B Ongbumrungpan	17	14

Quarterfinals
1	(Chinese Taipei) Tai T-y	21	23
8	(China) Chen YF	15	21
3	(South Korea) Sung J-h	21	13	21
7	(China) He BJ	15	21	15

Semifinals
1	(Chinese Taipei) Tai T-y	21	18	21
3	(South Korea) Sung J-h	9	21	7

=== Bottom half ===
First round
Q3	(Indonesia) Y Y Susanto	21	20	21
(Thailand) N Jindapol	11	22	14
Q2	(Thailand) P Buranaprasertsuk	15	12
6	(Thailand) R Intanon	21	21
(Canada) M Li	21	21
(Chinese Taipei) Lee C-h	16	13
(Japan) M Mitani	14	9
4	(Spain) C Marín	21	21
Q1	(Hong Kong) Chow K L	10	9
(Japan) S Sato	21	21
(South Korea) Kim H-m	10	21	17
5	(Japan) A Yamaguchi	21	14	21
(Japan) A Ohori	21	21
(Russia) E Kosetskaya	13	19
Q4	(Hong Kong) Leung Y Y	18	10
2	(India) P. V. Sindhu	21	21

Second round
Q3	(Indonesia) Y Y Susanto	3	14
6	(Thailand) R Intanon	21	21
(Canada) M Li	19	21	11
4	(Spain) C Marín	21	13	8^{r}
(Japan) S Sato	26	16	12
5	(Japan) A Yamaguchi	24	21	21
(Japan) A Ohori	14	17
2	(India) P. V. Sindhu	21	21

Quarterfinals
6	(Thailand) R Intanon	21	21
(Canada) M Li	14	16
5	(Japan) A Yamaguchi	12	19
2	(India) P. V. Sindhu	21	21

Semifinals
6	(Thailand) R Intanon	17	17
2	(India) P. V. Sindhu	21	21

=== Finals ===
Semifinals
1	(Chinese Taipei) Tai Tzu-ying	21	18	21
3	(South Korea) Sung Ji-hyun	9	21	7
6	(Thailand) Ratchanok Intanon	17	17
2	(India) P. V. Sindhu	21	21

Final
1	(Chinese Taipei) Tai Tzu-ying	21	21
2	(India) P. V. Sindhu	18	18

== Men's doubles ==
=== Seeds ===
1. (Indonesia) Marcus Fernaldi Gideon / Kevin Sanjaya Sukamuljo (champions)
2. (Denmark) Mathias Boe / Carsten Mogensen (second round)
3. (Japan) Takeshi Kamura / Keigo Sonoda (first round)
4. (China) Li Junhui / Liu Yuchen (semifinals)
5. (China) Liu Cheng / Zhang Nan (second round)
6. (Denmark) Mads Conrad-Petersen / Mads Pieler Kolding (final)
7. (Indonesia) Ricky Karanda Suwardi / Angga Pratama (second round)
8. (Chinese Taipei) Lee Jhe-huei / Lee Yang (first round)

=== Top half ===
First round
1	(Indonesia) M F Gideon (Indonesia) K S Sukamuljo	17	21	21
(Malaysia) Goh V S (Malaysia) Teo E Y	21	10	12
(Japan) T Hoki (Japan) Y Kobayashi	21	21
(Denmark) M Christiansen (Denmark) D Daugaard	19	16
8	(Chinese Taipei) Lee J-h (Chinese Taipei) Lee Y	16	16
(Malaysia) Ong Y S (Malaysia) Tan W K	21	21
(Indonesia) H Setiawan (Malaysia) Tan B H	21	21
Q4	(South Korea) Kim W-h (South Korea) Seo S-j	16	16
4	(China) Li JH (China) Liu YC	21	21
(Hong Kong) Law C H (Hong Kong) Lee C H	17	18
(India) M Attri (India) B. S Reddy	17	17
Q2	(Malaysia) Lim K W (South Korea) Yoo Y-s	21	21
7	(Indonesia) R K Suwardi (Indonesia) A Pratama	21	22
(China) He JT (China) Huang KX	19	20
(Russia) V Ivanov (Russia) I Sozonov	21	14	21
Q3	(China) Chai B (China) Wang ZK	18	21	14

Second round
1	(Indonesia) M F Gideon (Indonesia) K S Sukamuljo	18	21	21
(Japan) T Hoki (Japan) Y Kobayashi	21	13	14
(Malaysia) Ong Y S (Malaysia) Tan W K	17	22	21
(Indonesia) H Setiawan (Malaysia) Tan B H	21	20	12
4	(China) Li JH (China) Liu YC	22	18	21
Q2	(Malaysia) Lim K W (South Korea) Yoo Y-s	20	21	19
7	(Indonesia) R K Suwardi (Indonesia) A Pratama	9	12
(Russia) V Ivanov (Russia) I Sozonov	21	21

Quarterfinals
1	(Indonesia) M F Gideon (Indonesia) K S Sukamuljo	21	21
(Malaysia) Ong Y S (Malaysia) Tan W K	14	17
4	(China) Li JH (China) Liu YC	24	21
(Russia) V Ivanov (Russia) I Sozonov	22	11

Semifinals
1	(Indonesia) M F Gideon (Indonesia) K S Sukamuljo	21	16	21
4	(China) Li JH (China) Liu YC	13	21	13

=== Bottom half ===
First round
(Japan) T Inoue (Japan) Y Kaneko	21	22
PFQ	(Germany) M Lamsfuss (Germany) M E Seidel	17	20
Q1	(Chinese Taipei) Po L-w (Chinese Taipei) Yang M-t	17	12
5	(China) Liu C (China) Zhang N	21	21
(Indonesia) M Ahsan (Indonesia) R A Saputro	21	16	21
(Chinese Taipei) Chen H-l (Chinese Taipei) Wang C-l	13	21	15
(Denmark) K Astrup (Denmark) A S Rasmussen	25	21
3	(Japan) T Kamura (Japan) K Sonoda	23	16
(Indonesia) B Angriawan (Indonesia) Hardianto	18	21	21
(Hong Kong) Or C C (Hong Kong) Tang C M	21	19	12
(Thailand) K Kedren (Thailand) D Puavaranukroh	18	13
6	(Denmark) M Conrad-Petersen (Denmark) M P Kolding	21	21
(Indonesia) F Alfian (Indonesia) M R Ardianto	17	16
(Chinese Taipei) Lu C-y (Chinese Taipei) Yang P-h	21	21
(Chinese Taipei) Liao M-c (Chinese Taipei) Su C-h	22	21	13
2	(Denmark) M Boe (Denmark) C Mogensen	24	19	21

Second round
(Japan) T Inoue (Japan) Y Kaneko	21	17	21
5	(China) Liu C (China) Zhang N	18	21	19
(Indonesia) M Ahsan (Indonesia) R A Saputro	17	21	21
(Denmark) K Astrup (Denmark) A S Rasmussen	21	16	18
(Indonesia) B Angriawan (Indonesia) Hardianto	17	11
6	(Denmark) M Conrad-Petersen (Denmark) M P Kolding	21	21
(Chinese Taipei) Lu C-y (Chinese Taipei) Yang P-h	w	/	o
2	(Denmark) M Boe (Denmark) C Mogensen

Quarterfinals
(Japan) T Inoue (Japan) Y Kaneko	21	21
(Indonesia) M Ahsan (Indonesia) R A Saputro	17	13
6	(Denmark) M Conrad-Petersen (Denmark) M P Kolding	21	21
(Chinese Taipei) Lu C-y (Chinese Taipei) Yang P-h	18	15

Semifinals
(Japan) T Inoue (Japan) Y Kaneko	22	20	15
6	(Denmark) M Conrad-Petersen (Denmark) M P Kolding	20	22	21

=== Finals ===
Semifinals
1	(Indonesia) Marcus Fernaldi Gideon (Indonesia) Kevin Sanjaya Sukamuljo	21	16	21
4	(China) Li Junhui (China) Liu Yuchen	13	21	13
(Japan) Takuto Inoue (Japan) Yuki Kaneko	22	20	15
6	(Denmark) Mads Conrad-Petersen (Denmark) Mads Pieler Kolding	20	22	21

Final
1	(Indonesia) Marcus Fernaldi Gideon (Indonesia) Kevin Sanjaya Sukamuljo	21	21
6	(Denmark) Mads Conrad-Petersen (Denmark) Mads Pieler Kolding	12	18

== Women's doubles ==
=== Seeds ===
1. (China) Chen Qingchen / Jia Yifan (champions)
2. (Japan) Misaki Matsutomo / Ayaka Takahashi (first round)
3. (Denmark) Kamilla Rytter Juhl / Christinna Pedersen (second round)
4. (Japan) Yuki Fukushima / Sayaka Hirota (quarterfinals)
5. (Japan) Shiho Tanaka / Koharu Yonemoto (quarterfinals)
6. (South Korea) Kim Hye-rin / Lee So-hee (second round)
7. (China) Huang Yaqiong / Yu Xiaohan (quarterfinals)
8. (Thailand) Jongkolphan Kititharakul / Rawinda Prajongjai (semifinals)

=== Top half ===
First round
1	(China) Chen QC (China) Jia YF	21	21
(Germany) I Herttrich (Germany) C Nelte	18	8
(South Korea) Kim S-y (South Korea) Kong H-y	22	21
(Chinese Taipei) Chiang K-h (Chinese Taipei) Hung S-h	20	14
6	(South Korea) Kim H-r (South Korea) Lee S-h	14	21	21
(Indonesia) Y Barkah (Indonesia) N K Maheswari	21	18	18
(Japan) M Matsumoto (Japan) W Nagahara	21	9	22
(South Korea) Baek H-n (South Korea) Chae Y-j	15	21	20
4	(Japan) Y Fukushima (Japan) S Hirota	15	21	23
(Denmark) M Fruergaard (Denmark) S Thygesen	21	14	21
(Chinese Taipei) Hsu Y-c (Chinese Taipei) Wu T-j	16	12
(South Korea) Lee Y-r (South Korea) Shin S-c	21	21
8	(Thailand) J Kititharakul (Thailand) R Prajongjai	15	23	23
(Chinese Taipei) Lin X-m (Chinese Taipei) Wu F-c	21	21	21
(Hong Kong) Poon L Y (Hong Kong) Tse Y S	26	24
Q1	(Hong Kong) Ng W Y (Hong Kong) Yuen S Y	24	22

Second round
1	(China) Chen QC (China) Jia YF	21	21
(South Korea) Kim S-y (South Korea) Kong H-y	17	17
6	(South Korea) Kim H-r (South Korea) Lee S-h	12	15
(Japan) M Matsumoto (Japan) W Nagahara	21	21
4	(Japan) Y Fukushima (Japan) S Hirota	21	21
(South Korea) Lee Y-r (South Korea) Shin S-c	19	13
8	(Thailand) J Kititharakul (Thailand) R Prajongjai	21	21
(Hong Kong) Poon L Y (Hong Kong) Tse Y S	17	9

Quarterfinals
1	(China) Chen QC (China) Jia YF	17	21	21
(Japan) M Matsumoto (Japan) W Nagahara	21	18	13
4	(Japan) Y Fukushima (Japan) S Hirota	12	19
8	(Thailand) J Kititharakul (Thailand) R Prajongjai	21	21

Semifinals
1	(China) Chen QC (China) Jia YF	21	21
8	(Thailand) J Kititharakul (Thailand) R Prajongjai	19	19

=== Bottom half ===
First round
(Bulgaria) G Stoeva (Bulgaria) S Stoeva	18	21	16
(Malaysia) Vivian H K M (Malaysia) Woon K W	21	17	21
(Thailand) C Chaladchalam (Thailand) P Muenwong	14	17
5	(Japan) S Tanaka (Japan) K Yonemoto	21	21
(China) Huang DP (China) Li WM	21	19	21
(India) A Ponnappa (India) N. S Reddy	11	21	19
Q2	(Hong Kong) Ng T Y (Hong Kong) Yeung N T	13	16
3	(Denmark) K R Juhl (Denmark) C Pedersen	21	21
(Australia) S Mapasa (Australia) G Somerville	23	21
Q3	(Thailand) S Amitrapai (Thailand) P Chochuwong	21	14
Q4	(Malaysia) Soong F C (Malaysia) Tee J Y	16	16
7	(China) Huang YQ (China) Yu XH	21	21
(China) Du Y (China) Li YH	19	10
(Indonesia) G Polii (Indonesia) A Rahayu	21	21
(South Korea) Chang Y-n (South Korea) Jung K-e	21	21
2	(Japan) M Matsutomo (Japan) A Takahashi	16	14

Second round
(Malaysia) Vivian H K M (Malaysia) Woon K W	15	7
5	(Japan) S Tanaka (Japan) K Yonemoto	21	21
(China) Huang DP (China) Li WM	21	21
3	(Denmark) K R Juhl (Denmark) C Pedersen	16	12
(Australia) S Mapasa (Australia) G Somerville	12	22
7	(China) Huang YQ (China) Yu XH	21	24
(Indonesia) G Polii (Indonesia) A Rahayu	16	24	25
(South Korea) Chang Y-n (South Korea) Jung K-e	21	22	23

Quarterfinals
5	(Japan) S Tanaka (Japan) K Yonemoto	21	16	13
(China) Huang DP (China) Li WM	15	21	21
7	(China) Huang YQ (China) Yu XH	21	11	16
(Indonesia) G Polii (Indonesia) A Rahayu	19	21	21

Semifinals
(China) Huang DP (China) Li WM	21	21	15
(Indonesia) G Polii (Indonesia) A Rahayu	11	23	21

=== Finals ===
Semifinals
1	(China) Chen Qingchen (China) Jia Yifan	21	21
8	(Thailand) Jongkolphan Kititharakul (Thailand) Rawinda Prajongjai	19	19
(China) Huang Dongping (China) Li Wenmei	21	21	15
(Indonesia) Greysia Polii (Indonesia) Apriyani Rahayu	11	23	21

Final
1	(China) Chen Qingchen (China) Jia Yifan	14	21	21
(Indonesia) Greysia Polii (Indonesia) Apriyani Rahayu	21	16	15

== Mixed doubles ==
=== Seeds ===
1. (Indonesia) Tontowi Ahmad / Liliyana Natsir (withdrew)
2. (Indonesia) Praveen Jordan / Debby Susanto (first round)
3. (England) Chris Adcock / Gabrielle Adcock (first round)
4. (China) Wang Yilu / Huang Dongping (semifinals)
5. (China) Zheng Siwei / Huang Yaqiong (champions)
6. (China) Lu Kai / Tang Jinhua (first round)
7. (South Korea) Seo Seung-jae / Kim Ha-na (first round)
8. (Hong Kong) Tang Chun Man / Tse Ying Suet (quarterfinals)

=== Top half ===
First round
PFQ	(Australia) S Serasinghe (Australia) S Mapasa	13	10
(Japan) T Hoki (Japan) S Hirota	21	21
(Japan) K Kazuno (Japan) A Kurihara	17	22	21
(Chinese Taipei) Tseng M-h (Chinese Taipei) Hu L-f	21	20	13
6	(China) Lu K (China) Tang JH	17	13
(Singapore) Hee Y K (Singapore) Tan W H	21	21
Q2	(Indonesia) A E Prasetya (Indonesia) M D Oktavianti	21	17	21
(Chinese Taipei) Lu C-y (Chinese Taipei) Chiang K-h	18	21	19
3	(England) C Adcock (England) G Adcock	12	19
(Denmark) M Christiansen (Denmark) C Pedersen	21	21
(China) Zhang N (China) Liu XX	21	21
(Malaysia) Tan K M (Malaysia) Lai P J	13	17
7	(South Korea) Seo S-j (South Korea) Kim H-n	16	21	16
(Chinese Taipei) Liao M-c (Chinese Taipei) Chen H-h	21	15	21
Q1	(Denmark) N Nohr (Denmark) S Thygesen	21	19	16
(Chinese Taipei) Wang C-l (Chinese Taipei) Lee C-h	18	21	21

Second round
(Japan) T Hoki (Japan) S Hirota	21	18	21
(Japan) K Kazuno (Japan) A Kurihara	19	21	17
(Singapore) Hee Y K (Singapore) Tan W H	21	21
Q2	(Indonesia) A E Prasetya (Indonesia) M D Oktavianti	13	15
(Denmark) M Christiansen (Denmark) C Pedersen	24	21
(China) Zhang N (China) Liu XX	22	12
(Chinese Taipei) Liao M-c (Chinese Taipei) Chen H-h	21	21
(Chinese Taipei) Wang C-l (Chinese Taipei) Lee C-h	12	11

Quarterfinals
(Japan) T Hoki (Japan) S Hirota	21	21
(Singapore) Hee Y K (Singapore) Tan W H	16	13
(Denmark) M Christiansen (Denmark) C Pedersen	21	21
(Chinese Taipei) Liao M-c (Chinese Taipei) Chen H-h	19	17

Semifinals
(Japan) T Hoki (Japan) S Hirota	15	20
(Denmark) M Christiansen (Denmark) C Pedersen	21	22

=== Bottom half ===
First round
(South Korea) Kim W-h (South Korea) Shin S-c	21	21
(Hong Kong) Lee C H (Hong Kong) Chau H W	15	6
Q3	(Denmark) A S Rasmussen (Denmark) L Kjaersfeldt	17	21	15
8	(Hong Kong) Tang C M (Hong Kong) Tse Y S	21	16	21
PFQ	(Germany) M E Seidel (Germany) L Efler	21	21
(Chinese Taipei) Lee Y (Chinese Taipei) Hsu Y-c	17	13
(Japan) Y Kobayashi (Japan) M Matsutomo	16	22
4	(China) Wang YL (China) Huang DP	21	24
Q4	(Indonesia) H Faisal (Indonesia) G W Widjaja	15	21	21
PFQ	(Thailand) N Phuangphuapet (Thailand) J Kititharakul	21	19	16
(Thailand) D Puavaranukroh (Thailand) P Supajirakul	13	9
5	(China) Zheng SW (China) Huang YQ	21	21
(Malaysia) Goh S H (Malaysia) S J Lai	16	23	15
PFQ	(China) He JT (China) Du Y	21	21	21
(Germany) M Lamsfuss (Germany) I Herttrich	21	21
2	(Indonesia) P Jordan (Indonesia) D Susanto	15	19

Second round
(South Korea) Kim W-h (South Korea) Shin S-c	13	13
8	(Hong Kong) Tang C M (Hong Kong) Tse Y S	21	21
PFQ	(Germany) M E Seidel (Germany) L Efler	20	6
4	(China) Wang YL (China) Huang DP	22	21
Q4	(Indonesia) H Faisal (Indonesia) G W Widjaja	21	9	21
5	(China) Zheng SW (China) Huang YQ	14	21	23
PFQ	(China) He JT (China) Du Y	17	21	12
(Germany) M Lamsfuss (Germany) I Herttrich	21	18	21

Quarterfinals
8	(Hong Kong) Tang C M (Hong Kong) Tse Y S	18	18
4	(China) Wang YL (China) Huang DP	21	21
5	(China) Zheng SW (China) Huang YQ	w	/	o
(Germany) M Lamsfuss (Germany) I Herttrich

Semifinals
4	(China) Wang YL (China) Huang DP	10	18
5	(China) Zheng SW (China) Huang YQ	21	21

=== Finals ===
Semifinals
(Japan) Takuro Hoki (Japan) Sayaka Hirota	15	20
(Denmark) Mathias Christiansen (Denmark) Christinna Pedersen	21	22
4	(China) Wang Yilu (China) Huang Dongping	10	18
5	(China) Zheng Siwei (China) Huang Yaqiong	21	21

Final
(Denmark) Mathias Christiansen (Denmark) Christinna Pedersen	15	13
5	(China) Zheng Siwei (China) Huang Yaqiong	21	21

Preceded by 2016 Hong Kong Super Series	Hong Kong Open	Succeeded by 2018 Hong Kong Open
Preceded by 2017 China Open Super Series Premier	BWF Super Series; 2017 BWF Season	Succeeded by 2017 BWF Super Series Finals
