= Kim Min-sung =

Kim Min-sung may refer to:

- Kim Min-sung (baseball)
- Kim Min-seong, South Korean bobsledder
- Kim Min-sung (footballer)
