= Luka Rotković =

Montenegrin footballer

Luka Rotković Лука Ротковић
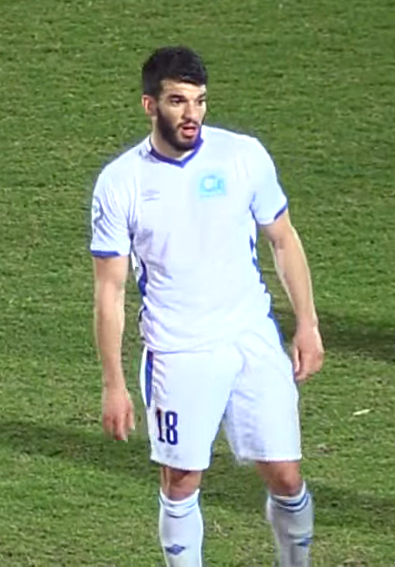
- Rotkoviс with Okzhetpes in 2015

Personal information
- Full name: Luka Rotković
- Date of birth: 5 July 1988 (age 38)
- Place of birth: Titograd, SFR Yugoslavia
- Height: 1.77 m (5 ft 9 1/2 in)
- Position: Forward

Senior career*
Years	Team	Apps	(Gls)
2009–2010	Petrovac	41	(14)
2011	Budućnost Podgorica	17	(1)
2012	Mladost Podgorica	21	(7)
2013	Mornar	25	(16)
2014	Maccabi Petah Tikva	4	(0)
2014	Mornar	11	(9)
2015	Okzhetpes	31	(13)
2016	Dinamo Minsk	16	(5)
2017	Ansan Greeners	9	(1)
2018	Luch Minsk	5	(1)
2019	Chittagong Abahani	0	(0)
2019–2020	Bangladesh Police	5	(0)
- * Club domestic league appearances and goals as of 10 April 2021

Luka Rotković (Serbian Cyrillic: Лука Ротковић; born 5 July 1988) is a Montenegrin former footballer who played as a forward. He last played for Bangladesh Premier League side Bangladesh Police FC.

== Club career ==
In February 2015, Rotković signed a one-year contract with FC Okzhetpes of the Kazakhstan Premier League, with the option of an additional second year.

On 3 March 2016, Rotković signed a one-year deal with Dinamo Minsk.

In January 2017, Rotković signed a three-year contract with a newly formed K League 2 side Ansan Greeners.

In October 2019, he joined the Bangladesh Premier League side Chittagong Abahani for the 2019 Sheikh Kamal International Club Cup. He scored three goals in the tournament, including a goal in the final, where his team ended up as runners-up. He left the club after the tournament.

In November 2019, he joined Bangladesh Police FC, a newly promoted team of the Bangladesh Premier League for the 2019–20 season.

== Career statistics ==
As of match played 17 June 2017

Club	Season	League			National Cup		Continental		Other		Total	
Club	Season	Division	Apps	Goals	Apps	Goals	Apps	Goals	Apps	Goals	Apps	Goals
Petrovac	2009–10	Montenegrin First League	24	7			3	2	—		27	9
Petrovac	2010–11	Montenegrin First League	17	7	2	1	—		—		19	8
Petrovac	Total		41	14	2	1	3	2	0	0	46	17
Budućnost Podgorica	2010–11	Montenegrin First League	10	0	0	0	—		—		10	0
Budućnost Podgorica	2011–12	Montenegrin First League	7	1	0	0	0	0	—		7	1
Budućnost Podgorica	Total		17	1	0	0	0	0	0	0	17	1
Mladost Podgorica	2011–12	Montenegrin First League	12	5	0	0	—		—		15	5
Mladost Podgorica	2012–13	Montenegrin First League	9	2	0	0	—		—		9	2
Mladost Podgorica	Total		21	7	0	0	0	0	0	0	21	7
Mornar	2012–13	Montenegrin First League	12	8	0	0	—		2	2	14	10
Mornar	2013–14	Montenegrin First League	13	8	0	0	—		—		13	8
Mornar	Total		25	16	0	0	0	0	2	2	27	18
Maccabi Petah Tikva	2013–14	Israeli Premier League	4	0	2	2	—		—		6	2
Mornar	2014–15	Montenegrin First League	11	9	2	0	—		—		13	9
Okzhetpes	2015	Kazakhstan Premier League	31	13	2	2	—		—		33	15
Dinamo Minsk	2016	Belarusian Premier League	16	5	1	0	6	0	—		23	5
Ansan Greeners	2017	K League 2	9	1	1	0	—		—		10	1
Career total			175	66	10	5	9	2	2	2	196	75
