= Park Jun-hui =

South Korean footballer (born 1991)

Personal information
- Full name: Park Jun-hui
- Date of birth: 1 March 1991 (age 35)
- Place of birth: South Korea
- Height: 1.84 m (6 ft 1/2 in)
- Position: Central midfielder

Youth career
- 2010–2013: Konkuk University

Senior career*
Years	Team	Apps	(Gls)
2014–2016	Pohang Steelers	17	(0)
2017–2019	Ansan Greeners	85	(4)
2020	Gwangju FC	2	(0)
2021	Bucheon FC 1995	17	(0)
- * Club domestic league appearances and goals as of 13 January 2022

Park Jun-hui (Korean: 박준희; born 1 March 1991) is a South Korean footballer who plays as a midfielder.

== Career ==
He was selected by Pohang Steelers in the 2014 K League draft.
