= Kim Min-kyu (footballer, born 1993) =

South Korean association football player

Personal information
- Date of birth: 18 October 1993 (age 33)
- Height: 1.84 m (6 ft 0 in)
- Position: Forward

Team information
- Current team: Changwon City
- Number: 99

Youth career
- –2011: Ulsan Hyundai
- 2012–2015: Dankook University

Senior career*
Years	Team	Apps	(Gls)
2016–2019	Ulsan Hyundai	2	(0)
2016	→ Ulsan Hyundai Mipo Dockyard (loan)	16	(7)
2017	→ Seoul E-Land (loan)	10	(1)
2017	→ Gimhae (loan)	14	(5)
2018	→ Gwangju (loan)	13	(1)
2019	→ Gyeongju KHNP (loan)	22	(2)
2020	Gimhae	13	(1)
2021	Mokpo	7	(1)
2021–	Changwon City	8	(0)
- * Club domestic league appearances and goals as of 14:18, 5 October 2021 (UTC)

- Kim Min-kyu
- Hangul: 김민규
- RR: Gim Mingyu
- MR: Kim Min'gyu

Kim Min-kyu (Korean: 김민규; born 18 October 1993) is a South Korean footballer currently playing as a forward for Changwon City.

== Career statistics ==
=== Club ===
As of 5 October 2021.

Club	Season	League			Cup		Other		Total	
Club	Season	Division	Apps	Goals	Apps	Goals	Apps	Goals	Apps	Goals
Dankook University	2015	–			2 (Note: Appearances in the Korean FA Cup)	1	0	0	2	1
Ulsan Hyundai	2016	K League Classic	0	0	1	0	0	0	1	0
Ulsan Hyundai	2017	K League Classic	0	0	0	0	0	0	0	0
Ulsan Hyundai	2018	K League 1	2	0	0	0	0	0	2	0
Ulsan Hyundai	2019	K League 1	0	0	0	0	0	0	0	0
Ulsan Hyundai	Total		2	0	1	0	0	0	3	0
Ulsan Hyundai Mipo Dockyard (loan)	2016	Korea National League	16	7	0	0	0	0	16	7
Seoul E-Land (loan)	2017	K League Challenge	10	1	0	0	0	0	10	1
Gimhae (loan)	2017	Korea National League	14	5	0	0	3 (Note: Appearances in the KNL Cup)	0	17	5
Gwangju (loan)	2018	K League 2	13	1	0	0	1 (Note: Appearances in the K League 2 promotion playoffs)	0	14	1
Gyeongju KHNP (loan)	2019	Korea National League	22	2	4	2	6	3	32	7
Gimhae	2020	K3 League	13	1	2	0	2 (Note: Appearances in the K3 League promotion playoffs)	0	17	1
Mokpo	2021	K3 League	7	1	1	0	0	0	8	1
Changwon City	2021	K3 League	8	0	0	0	0	0	8	0
Career total			105	18	10	3	12	3	127	24
