= Raúl Tarragona =

Uruguayan footballer (born 1987)

Personal information
- Full name: Raúl Andrés Tarragona Lemos
- Date of birth: 6 March 1987 (age 39)
- Place of birth: Montevideo, Uruguay
- Height: 1.80 m (5 ft 11 in)
- Position: Forward

Team information
- Current team: Central Español

Senior career*
Years	Team	Apps	(Gls)
2008–2009	Central Español		
2009–2010	Bella Vista		
2010	Liverpool	10	(0)
2011	Bella Vista	7	(0)
2011–2012	Racing de Montevideo	5	(0)
2012	Cerro Largo	9	(0)
2013	Mushuc Runa	38	(5)
2014	Técnico Universitario	15	(2)
2014–2015	Boston River	31	(15)
2015–2016	Salam Zgharta	20	(10)
2016	Rentistas	12	(7)
2017–2018	Ansan Greeners	49	(18)
2019	Kelantan		
2019	Rentistas	20	(1)
2020	Cerrito	19	(4)
2021	Central Español	2	(2)
2022	Villa Española	3	(2)
2023-2025	Puntarenas F.C.	5	(0)
2025-	Central Español	23	(12)
- * Club domestic league appearances and goals as of August 8, 2026

Raúl Andrés Tarragona Lemos (born 6 March 1987) is a Uruguayan footballer who plays for Central Español as a forward.
