= Hong Dong-hyun =

South Korean footballer

Personal information
- Full name: Hong Dong-hyun
- Date of birth: 30 October 1991 (age 35)
- Place of birth: South Korea
- Height: 1.81 m (5 ft 11 1/2 in)
- Position: Midfielder

Team information
- Current team: Ansan Greeners

Youth career
- 2010–2013: Soongsil University

Senior career*
Years	Team	Apps	(Gls)
2014–2017	Busan IPark	51	(6)
2017–	Ansan Greeners	29	(2)
- * Club domestic league appearances and goals as of 21 January 2019

Hong Dong-hyun (Korean: 홍동현; born 30 October 1991) is a South Korean footballer who plays as a midfielder for Ansan Greeners in the K League 2.

== Career ==
Hong signed with Busan IPark after graduating from Soongsil University. His first professional goal came directly from a free kick in a 2–1 defeat to Ulsan on 28 November 2015. In the following game, the first leg of a relegation play-off against Suwon City, Hong was sent off for two bookable offences. Busan went on to lose the tie and were relegated to the K League Challenge.

== Club career statistics ==
As of 21 July 2017

Club performance			League		Cup		Play-offs		Total	
Season	Club	League	Apps	Goals	Apps	Goals	Apps	Goals	Apps	Goals
2014	Busan IPark	KL Classic	17	0	2	0	–	–	19	0
2015	Busan IPark	KL Classic	5	1	1	0	1	0	7	1
2016	Busan IPark	KL Challenge	28	5	1	0	1	0	30	5
2017	Busan IPark	KL Challenge	1	0	0	0	0	0	1	0
Career total			51	6	4	0	2	0	57	6
