= Kim Seong-soo (footballer) =

South Korean footballer (born 1992)

Personal information
- Date of birth: 26 December 1992 (age 33)
- Place of birth: South Korea
- Height: 1.72 m (5 ft 7 1/2 in)
- Position: Midfielder

Youth career
- 2011–2012: Pai Chai University

Senior career*
Years	Team	Apps	(Gls)
2013–2015	Daejeon Citizen	19	(0)
2016	Goyang Zaicro FC	8	(0)
2017	Daejeon Citizen	0	(0)
2018–2019	Cheongju FC		
2020	Siheung Citizen FC		
2021	Daejeon Hana Citizen		
2022	Chungju		
2023	Seoul Nowon United		
2023–2024	North Bangkok University	31	(3)
2024	Lampang	7	(0)
- * Club domestic league appearances and goals as of 7 January 2025

- Kim Seong-soo
- Hangul: 김성수
- RR: Gim Seongsu
- MR: Kim Sŏngsu

Kim Seong-soo (Korean: 김성수; born 26 December 1992) is a South Korean footballer who plays as midfielder.

== Career ==
He was selected by Daejeon Citizen in the 2013 K League draft. He made his debut in the league match against Suwon Samsung on 20 April 2013.
