= Park Seung-wook =

South Korean footballer (born 1997)

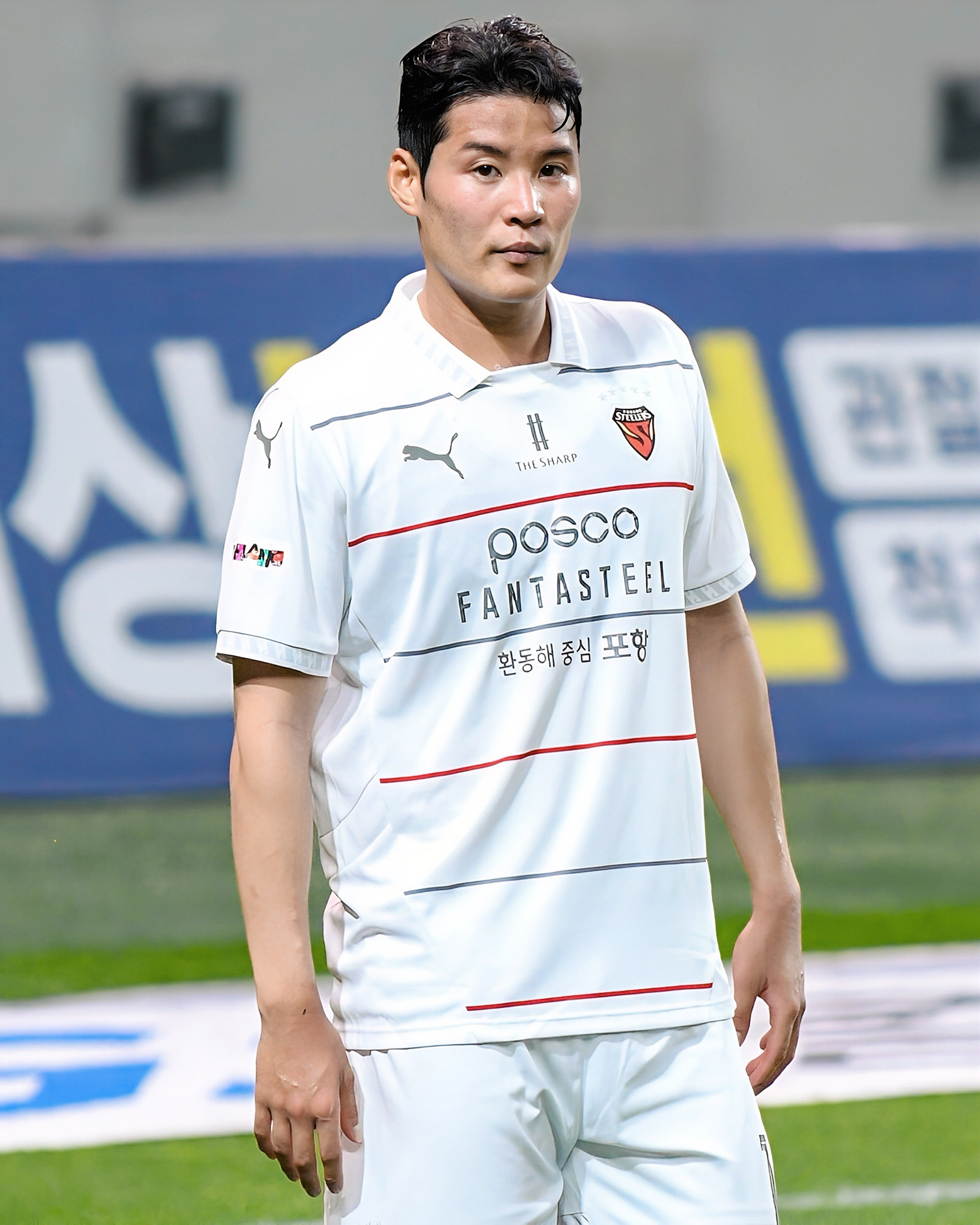
- Park in 2025

Personal information
- Date of birth: 7 May 1997 (age 29)
- Place of birth: Yangsan, Gyeongnam, South Korea
- Height: 1.84 m (6 ft 0 in)
- Positions: Centre-back; full-back

Team information
- Current team: Shimizu S-Pulse
- Number: 14

Youth career
- –2009: Yangsan Elementary School
- 2010–2012: Yangsan Middle School
- 2013–2015: Haksung High School
- 2016–2018: Dong-Eui University

Senior career*
Years	Team	Apps	(Gls)
2019–2021	Busan Transportation Corporation	60	(0)
2021–2025	Pohang Steelers	98	(3)
2024–2025	→ Gimcheon Sangmu (draft)	48	(0)
2026–	Shimizu S-Pulse	12	(0)

International career^{‡}
2024–	South Korea	5	(0)
- * Club domestic league appearances and goals as of 10 August 2026 ‡ National team caps and goals as of 15 July 2025

- Park Seung-wook
- Hangul: 박승욱
- RR: Bak Seunguk
- MR: Pak Sŭnguk

Park Seung-wook (Korean: 박승욱; born 7 May 1997) is a South Korean footballer who plays as a centre-back or a full-back for Shimizu S-Pulse and the South Korea national team.

== Club career ==
=== Busan Transportations Corporation ===
After graduating from Dong-Eui University, Park signed for K3 League club, Busan Transportations Corporation.

=== Pohang Steelers ===
On 6 July 2021, Park joined K League 1 side Pohang Steelers.

==== Gimcheon Sangmu (loan) ====
On 1 January 2024, Park was loaned to Gimcheon Sangmu.

== International career ==
In June 2024, Park was called up by South Korea national team caretaker Kim Do-hoon for the upcoming 2026 FIFA World Cup qualification match. He made his debut for the South Korea national team on 6 June 2024 against Singapore at the Singapore National Stadium. He substituted another debutant Hwang Jae-won in the 70th minute and earned an assist in the remaining time as South Korea won 7–0.

== Career statistics ==
=== Club ===
As of 29 April 2026.

Appearances and goals by club, season and competition
Club	Season	League			National cup (Note: Includes Korean FA Cup)		Continental		Other		Total	
Club	Season	Division	Apps	Goals	Apps	Goals	Apps	Goals	Apps	Goals	Apps	Goals
Busan Transportation Corp.	2019	KNL	23	0	1	0	—		4 (Note: Appearances in Korea National League Championship)	0	28	0
Busan Transportation Corp.	2020	K3 League	21	0	1	0	—		1 (Note: Appearance in K3 League playoffs)	0	23	0
Busan Transportation Corp.	2021	K3 League	16	0	3	1	—		0	0	19	1
Busan Transportation Corp.	Total		60	0	5	1	0	0	5	0	70	1
Pohang Steelers	2021	K League 1	19	1	1	0	4 (Note: Appearances in AFC Champions League Elite)	0	—		24	1
Pohang Steelers	2022	K League 1	29	0	2	0	—		—		31	0
Pohang Steelers	2023	K League 1	32	1	4	0	6	0	—		42	1
Pohang Steelers	2025	K League 1	18	1	0	0	2 (Note: Appearances in AFC Champions League Two)	0	—		20	1
Pohang Steelers	Total		98	3	7	0	12	0	0	0	117	3
Gimcheon Sangmu (draft)	2024	K League 1	32	0	0	0	—		—		32	0
Gimcheon Sangmu (draft)	2025	K League 1	16	0	0	0	—		—		16	0
Gimcheon Sangmu (draft)	Total		48	0	0	0	0	0	0	0	48	0
Shimizu S-Pulse	2026–27	J1 League	0	0	0	0	—		10 (Note: Appearances in J1 100 Year Vision League)	0	10	0
Career total			206	3	12	1	12	0	15	0	245	4

== Honours ==
Pohang Steelers

- Korean FA Cup: 2023

Individual

- K League 1 Best XI: 2024
