= Lee Geon (footballer) =

South Korean footballer

Personal information
- Full name: Lee Geon
- Date of birth: 8 January 1996 (age 30)
- Place of birth: South Korea
- Height: 1.80 m (5 ft 11 in)
- Position: Winger

Team information
- Current team: Seongnam FC
- Number: 28

Youth career
- 2014–2016: Chung-Ang University

Senior career*
Years	Team	Apps	(Gls)
2017–2018	Ansan Greeners	41	(3)
2019–	Seongnam FC	0	(0)

International career
2017–	South Korea U-23		
- * Club domestic league appearances and goals as of 4 January 2020

Lee Geon (Korean: 이건; born 8 January 1996) is a South Korean footballer who plays as winger for Seongnam FC in K League 1.

== Career ==
Lee Geon has joined newly formed club Ansan Greeners FC in 2017.
