= Lee Chung-woong =

South Korean footballer

Personal information
- Date of birth: 15 March 1993 (age 33)
- Place of birth: South Korea
- Height: 1.85 m (6 ft 1 in)
- Position: Defensive midfielder

Team information
- Current team: Busan IPark
- Number: 15

Senior career*
Years	Team	Apps	(Gls)
2015–2022	Busan I'Park	56	(1)
2020–2021	Siheung Citizen FC (loan)	31	(0)
- * Club domestic league appearances and goals as of 10 October 2022

Lee Chung-Woong (Korean: 이청웅; born March 15, 1993) is a South Korean former football player who played as a defensive midfielder or centre back for Busan IPark.

== Club career ==
Lee made his professional debut for Busan IPark on 22 August 2015 in a 1-0 defeat to Seongnam. His first goal for the club was the winning goal in a 2-1 victory over Gyeongnam in the FA Cup on 27 April 2016. Lee completed his military service with K4 League side Siheung Citizen before returning to parent club Busan IPark midway through the 2021 K League 2 season. He announced his retirement in September 2022 at the age of 29.

== Club career statistics ==
As of 10 October 2022

Club performance			League		Cup		Play-offs		Total	
Season	Club	League	Apps	Goals	Apps	Goals	Apps	Goals	Apps	Goals
South Korea			League		KFA Cup		Play-offs		Total	
2015	Busan IPark	K League 1	6	0	0	0	2	0	8	0
2016	Busan IPark	K League 2	7	0	1	1	0	0	8	1
2017	Busan IPark	K League 2	13	0	0	0	0	0	13	0
2018	Busan IPark	K League 2	12	1	3	0	1	0	16	1
2019	Busan IPark	K League 2	0	0	0	0	0	0	0	0
2021	Busan IPark	K League 2	3	0	0	0	0	0	3	0
2022	Busan IPark	K League 2	15	0	0	0	0	0	15	0
Career total			56	1	4	1	3	0	63	2
