= Kim Tae-eun =

South Korean footballer

Personal information
- Full name: Kim Tae-eun
- Date of birth: 21 September 1989 (age 37)
- Place of birth: Incheon, South Korea
- Height: 1.79 m (5 ft 10 in)
- Position: Full-back

Team information
- Current team: Pocheon Citizen FC
- Number: 2

Youth career
- 2008–2010: Pai Chai University

Senior career*
Years	Team	Apps	(Gls)
2011	Incheon United	0	(0)
2012–2013	Incheon Korail	22	(0)
2014–2015	Gyeongju KH&NP	34	(1)
2015–2016	Seoul E-Land	36	(0)
2017	Daejeon Citizen	25	(0)
2018	Seoul E-Land	18	(0)
2019	Daejeon Korail	24	(0)
2022–	Pocheon Citizen FC	50	(1)
- * Club domestic league appearances and goals as of 22 October 2022

Kim Tae-eun (Korean: 김태은; born 21 September 1989) is a South Korean footballer who plays as a full-back for Pocheon Citizen FC.

== Career ==
Kim Tae-eun was selected by Incheon United in 2011 K League draft.

In July 2015, he signed with Seoul E-Land after a four-year spell in Korea National League.
