= Kim Sin-cheol =

South Korean footballer (born 1990)

Personal information
- Full name: Kim Sin-cheol
- Date of birth: 29 November 1990 (age 35)
- Place of birth: South Korea
- Height: 1.78 m (5 ft 10 in)
- Position: Forward

Team information
- Current team: FC Anyang
- Number: 14

Youth career
- 2006–2008: Yonsei University
- 2006–2007: → S.C. Braga (KFA Youth Project)
- 2009–2012: Yonsei University

Senior career*
Years	Team	Apps	(Gls)
2013–2016	Bucheon FC	25	(2)
2014–2015	→ Ansan Police (army)	13	(0)
2017–	FC Anyang	31	(4)
- * Club domestic league appearances and goals as of 13 November 2019

Kim Sin-cheol (Korean: 김신철; born 29 November 1990) is a South Korean footballer who plays as midfielder for FC Anyang in K League 2. He is a son of Kim Bong-gil. Besides South Korea, he has played in Portugal.

== Career ==
Yoo was selected by Bucheon FC in the 2013 K League draft. He made 25 appearances and 2 goals in his debut season. In 2014~2015 seasons, he served in army by Ansan Mugunghwa FC. After 2016 season, he moves to FC Anyang.
