= Park Kyung-ik =

South Korean footballer (born 1991)

Personal information
- Date of birth: 13 August 1991 (age 35)
- Place of birth: South Korea
- Height: 1.73 m (5 ft 8 in)
- Position: Midfielder

Team information
- Current team: Changwon City
- Number: 13

Youth career
- 2010: Gwangju University

Senior career*
Years	Team	Apps	(Gls)
2011–2015	Ulsan Hyundai	0	(0)
2013	→ Ulsan Hyundai Mipo (loan)	6	(1)
2014–2015	→ Sangju Sangmu (army)	13	(1)
2015–2016	Ulsan Hyundai Mipo	9	(0)
2017–	Ansan Greeners	1	(0)
- * Club domestic league appearances and goals as of 1 January 2018

Park Kyung-ik (Korean: 박경익; born 13 August 1991) is a South Korean footballer who plays as midfielder for Ansan Greeners in K League Challenge.

== Career ==
Park was selected by Ulsan Hyundai in the 2012 K League draft.

He joined Ansan Greeners ahead of the 2017 season.
