= Kim Min-sung (footballer) =

South Korean footballer (born 2000)

Personal information
- Full name: Kim Min-sung
- Date of birth: 11 May 2000 (age 26)
- Place of birth: South Korea
- Position: Midfielder

Team information
- Current team: Paju Frontier
- Number: 2

Senior career*
Years	Team	Apps	(Gls)
2019–2021	Varnsdorf	6	(0)
2020	→ Sokol Brozany (loan)	1	(0)
2021–2022	VFB Hilden		
2023	Seoul Jungnang		
2024	Ansan Greeners	6	(0)
2024–2025	Seongnam	0	(0)
2025	Sejong SA		
2026–	Paju Frontier	13	(0)
- * Club domestic league appearances and goals as of 6 August 2026

- Kim Min-sung
- Hangul: 김민성
- RR: Gim Minseong
- MR: Kim Minsŏng

Kim Min-sung (Korean: 김민성; born 11 May 2000) is a South Korean footballer currently playing as a midfielder for Paju Frontier.

== Career statistics ==
=== Club ===
As of 13 June 2020.

Club	Season	League			Cup		Other		Total	
Club	Season	Division	Apps	Goals	Apps	Goals	Apps	Goals	Apps	Goals
Varnsdorf	2018–19	Fortuna národní liga	2	0	0	0	0	0	2	0
Varnsdorf	2019–20	Fortuna národní liga	0	0	0	0	0	0	0	0
Career total			2	0	0	0	0	0	2	0
