= Hwang In-jae =

South Korean footballer (born 1994)

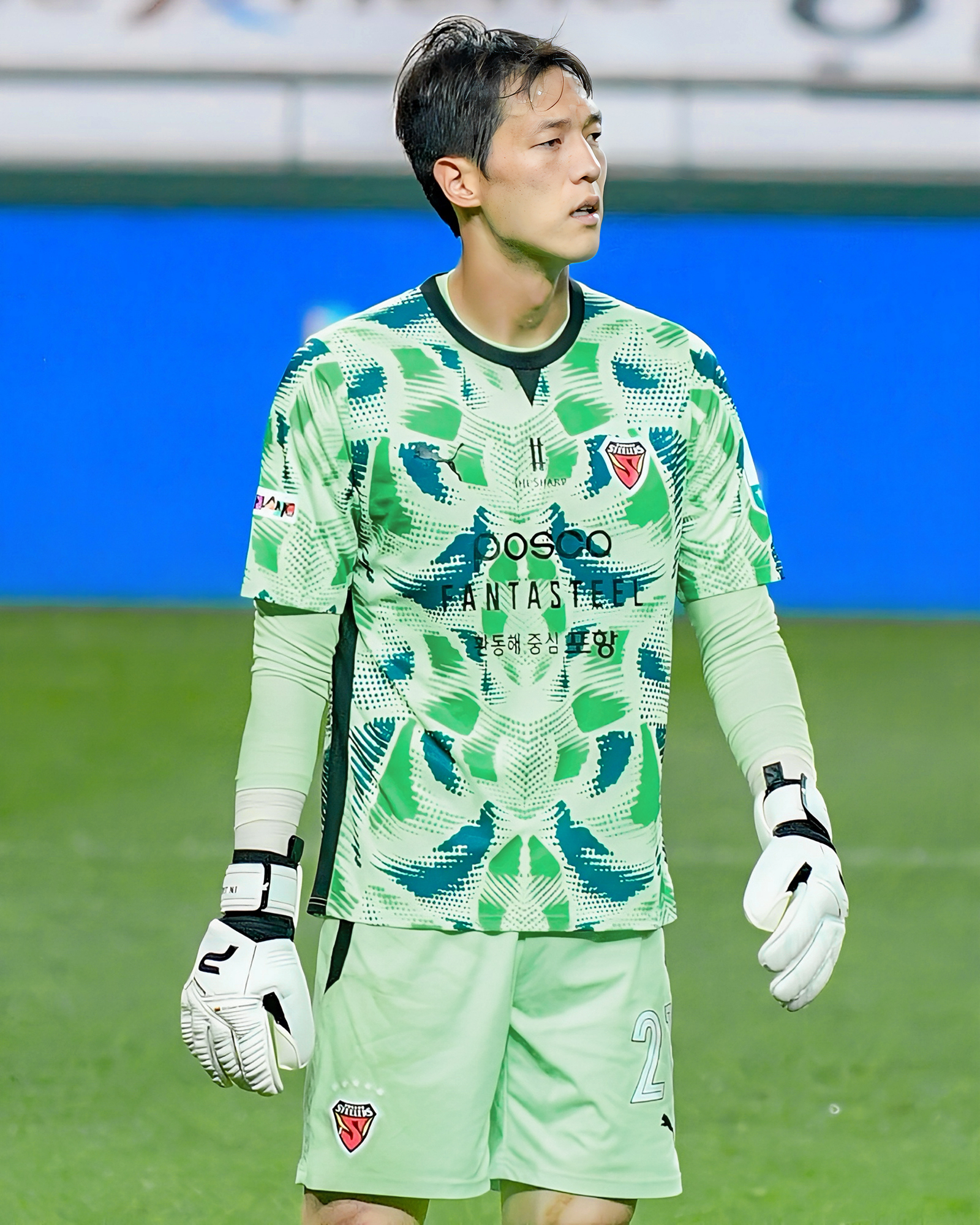
- Hwang in 2025

Personal information
- Date of birth: 22 April 1994 (age 32)
- Place of birth: South Korea
- Height: 1.87 m (6 ft 2 in)
- Position: Goalkeeper

Team information
- Current team: Pohang Steelers
- Number: 21

Youth career
- –2015: Yonsei University

Senior career*
Years	Team	Apps	(Gls)
2016	Gwangju FC	1	(0)
2017	Ansan Greeners	6	(0)
2018	Seongnam FC	1	(0)
2019	Ansan Greeners	18	(0)
2020–	Pohang Steelers	120	(0)
2021–2022	→ Gimcheon Sangmu (draft)	16	(0)
- * Club domestic league appearances and goals as of 3 August 2026

- Hwang In-jae
- Hangul: 황인재
- RR: Hwang Injae
- MR: Hwang Injae

Hwang In-jae (Korean: 황인재; born 22 April 1994) is a South Korean footballer currently playing as a goalkeeper for Pohang Steelers.

== Career statistics ==
As of 1 June 2025.

Club	Season	League			Cup		Continental		Other		Total	
Club	Season	Division	Apps	Goals	Apps	Goals	Apps	Goals	Apps	Goals	Apps	Goals
Gwangju FC	2016	K League 1	1	0	1	0	—		—		2	0
Ansan Greeners	2017	K League 2	6	0	1	0	—		—		7	0
Seongnam FC	2018	K League 2	1	0	0	0	—		—		1	0
Ansan Greeners	2019	K League 2	18	0	1	0	—		—		19	0
Pohang Steelers	2020	K League 1	0	0	1	0	—		—		1	0
Pohang Steelers	2021	K League 1	2	0	0	0	—		—		2	0
Pohang Steelers	2023	K League 1	38	0	4	0	4 (Note: Appearances in AFC Champions League (Elite))	0	—		46	0
Pohang Steelers	2024	K League 1	29	0	4	0	4	0	—		37	0
Pohang Steelers	2025	K League 1	16	0	0	0	1	0	—		17	0
Pohang Steelers	Total		85	0	9	0	9	0	—		103	0
Gimcheon Sangmu (draft)	2021	K League 2	0	0	0	0	—		—		0	0
Gimcheon Sangmu (draft)	2022	K League 1	16	0	0	0	—		2 (Note: Appearances in K League promotion-relegation playoffs)	0	18	0
Gimcheon Sangmu (draft)	Total		16	0	0	0	—		2	0	18	0
Career total			127	0	12	0	9	0	2	0	150	0

== Honours ==
Pohang Steelers

- Korean FA Cup: 2023, 2024
