= Yoo Yeon-seung =

South Korean footballer (born 1991)

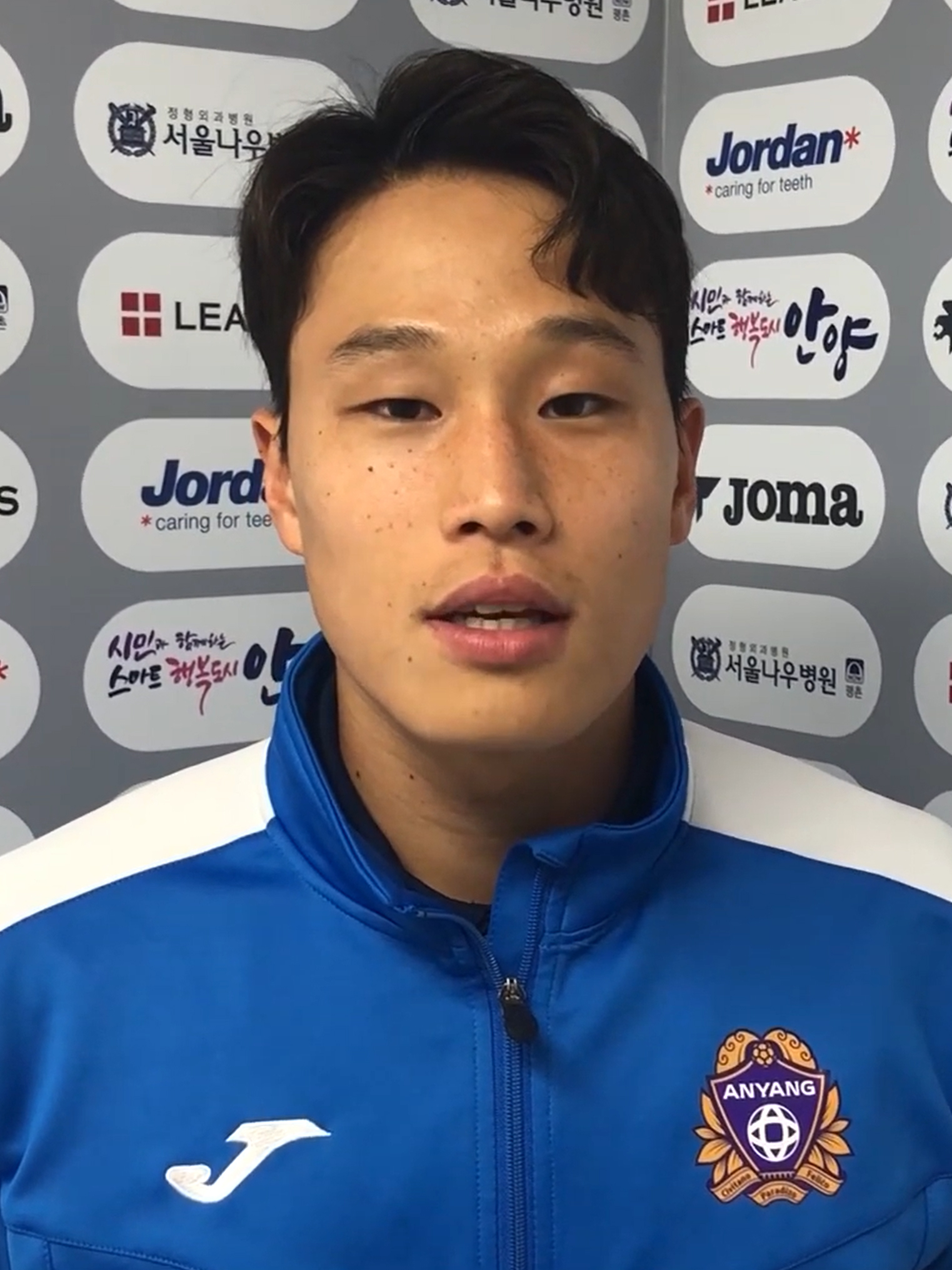
- Yoo with FC Anyang in 2019

Personal information
- Full name: Yoo Yeon-seung
- Date of birth: 21 December 1991 (age 34)
- Place of birth: South Korea
- Height: 1.78 m (5 ft 10 in)
- Position: Midfielder

Team information
- Current team: Yangju Citizen FC
- Number: 24

Youth career
- 2010–2013: Yonsei University

Senior career*
Years	Team	Apps	(Gls)
2014–2015	Daejeon Citizen	25	(1)
2016	Ulsan Hyundai Mipo Dolphin	17	(3)
2017	Ansan Greeners	26	(1)
2018–2020	FC Anyang	20	(1)
2021	Daejeon Korail FC	19	(1)
2022-	Yangju Citizen FC	26	(0)
- * Club domestic league appearances and goals as of 22 October 2022

Yoo Yeon-seung (Korean: 유연승; born 21 December 1991) is a South Korean footballer who plays as a midfielder for Yangju Citizen FC in the K3 League.

== Career ==
Yoo was selected by Daejeon Citizen in the 2014 K League draft.
