= 2024 Pohang Steelers season =

Pohang Steelers
2024 season
- Chairman: Shin Young-gwon
- Manager: Park Tae-ha
Home colours	Away colours

The 2024 season was Pohang Steelers' 42nd season in the K League 1 in South Korea. Pohang Steelers competed in the K League 1, Korean FA Cup, and the 2024–25 AFC Champions League Elite.

== Players ==
No.	Player	Nationality	Date of birth (age)	Previous club	Contract since	Contract end
Goalkeepers
1	Yoon Pyeong-gook	(South Korea)	8 February 1992 (age 34)	(South Korea) Gwangju	2022	
21	Hwang In-jae	(South Korea)	22 April 1994 (age 32)	(South Korea) Gimcheon Sangmu	2020	
32	Lee Seung-Hwan	(South Korea)	5 April 2003 (age 23)	Youth Team	2022	
41	Kang Seong-hyeok	(South Korea)	24 August 2005 (age 20)	(South Korea) Daykey High School	2024	
Defenders
2	Eo Jeong-won	(South Korea)	8 July 1999 (age 27)	(South Korea) Busan IPark	2024	
3	Lee Dong-hee	(South Korea)	7 February 2000 (age 26)	(South Korea) Bucheon	2024	2026
5	Jonathan Aspropotamitis	(Australia)	7 June 1996 (age 30)	(Australia) Macarthur	2024	
12	Kim Ryun-seong	(South Korea)	4 June 2002 (age 24)	(South Korea) Gimcheon Sangmu	2021	
17	Shin Kwang-hoon	(South Korea)	18 March 1987 (age 39)	(South Korea) Gangwon	2021	
23	Lee Dong-hyeop	(South Korea)	12 March 2003 (age 23)	(South Korea) Kwangwoon University	2024	
26	Lee Tae-seok	(South Korea)	28 July 2002 (age 23)	(South Korea) FC Seoul	2024	
34	Lee Gyu-baeg	(South Korea)	10 February 2004 (age 22)	Youth Team	2022	
39	Min Sang-gi	(South Korea)	27 August 1991 (age 34)	(South Korea) Suwon Samsung Bluewings	2024	
55	Choi Hyeon-woong	(South Korea)	9 October 2003 (age 22)	(South Korea) Jeonbuk Hyundai	2023	
Midfielders
4	Jeon Min-gwang	(South Korea)	17 January 1993 (age 33)	(South Korea) Goyang Citizen	2019	
6	Kim Jong-woo	(South Korea)	1 October 1993 (age 32)	(South Korea) Gwangju	2019	
8	Oberdan	(Brazil)	3 July 1995 (age 31)	(Brazil) Figueirense	2024	
10	Baek Sung-dong	(South Korea)	13 August 1991 (age 34)	(South Korea) FC Anyang	2023	
13	Yun Suk-ju	(South Korea)	25 February 2002 (age 24)	(South Korea) Gimcheon Sangmu	2022	
16	Han Chan-hee	(South Korea)	17 March 1997 (age 29)	(South Korea) Gimcheon Sangmu	2023	
19	Yoon Min-Ho	(South Korea)	17 October 1999 (age 26)	(South Korea) Gimpo	2022	
22	Kim Gyu-hyeong	(South Korea)	29 March 1999 (age 27)	(South Korea) Suwon	2024	
66	Kim Jun-ho	(South Korea)	11 December 2002 (age 23)	Youth Team	2024	
70	Hwang Seo-woong	(South Korea)	22 January 2005 (age 21)	Youth Team	2024	
77	Wanderson	(Brazil)	3 July 1995 (age 31)	(United Arab Emirates) Al-Ittihad Kalba	2022	
88	Kim Dong-jin	(South Korea)	30 July 2003 (age 22)	(South Korea) Hannam University	2024	
89	Kim Myung-jun	(South Korea)	21 March 2006 (age 20)	Youth Team	2024	
Forwards
7	Kim In-sung	(South Korea)	9 September 1989 (age 36)	(South Korea) Seoul E-Land	2023	
9	Jorge Luiz	(Brazil)	21 June 1999 (age 27)	(Portugal) Feirense	2024	
11	Jo Seong-joon	(South Korea)	27 November 1990 (age 35)	(South Korea) FC Anyang	2024	
14	Heo Yong-joon	(South Korea)	8 January 1993 (age 33)	(Japan) Vegalta Sendai	2020	
15	Lee Kyu-min	(South Korea)	28 September 2005 (age 20)	(South Korea) Pyeongtaek Jinwee	2024	
18	Kang Hyeon-Je	(South Korea)	31 August 2002 (age 23)	(South Korea) Sangji University	2023	
20	An Jae-joon	(South Korea)	13 April 2001 (age 25)	(South Korea) Bucheon	2024	
27	Jeong Jae-hee	(South Korea)	28 April 1994 (age 32)	(South Korea) Gimcheon Sangmu	2022	
33	Lee Ho-jae	(South Korea)	14 October 2000 (age 25)	(South Korea) Korea University	2021	
37	Hong Yun-sang	(South Korea)	19 March 2002 (age 24)	(Germany) 1. FC Nürnberg II	2023	
Players who went out on loan during season
20	Park Chan-yong	(South Korea)	27 January 1996 (age 30)	(South Korea) Jeonnam Dragons	2022	
28	Kim Jung-hyun	(South Korea)	29 June 2004 (age 22)	(South Korea) Cheonan Jeil High School	2024	
29	Park Hyeong-woo	(South Korea)	13 September 2004 (age 21)	(South Korea) Cheonan Jeil High School	2023	
30	Yoon Jae-woon	(South Korea)	1 April 2002 (age 24)	(South Korea) Ajou University	2023	
	Park Su-been	(South Korea)	27 August 2005 (age 20)	Youth Team	2024	
Players who left mid-season
	Kang Hyeon-mu	(South Korea)	13 March 1995 (age 31)	(South Korea) Gimcheon Sangmu	2014	

== Transfers ==
=== Pre-season ===
==== In ====
Transfers in

Position	Player	Transferred from	Fee
GK	(South Korea) Kang Seong-hyeok	(South Korea) Daykey High School	Free transfer
DF	(South Korea) Eo Jeong-won	(South Korea) Busan IPark	Free transfer
DF	(South Korea) Lee Dong-hee	(South Korea) Bucheon	Free transfer
DF	(South Korea) Lee Dong-hyeop	(South Korea) Kwangwoon University	Free transfer
DF	(Australia) Jonathan Aspropotamitis	(Australia) Macarthur	Free transfer
MF	(South Korea) Kim Dong-jin	(South Korea) Hannam University	Free transfer
MF	(South Korea) Kim Gyu-hyeong	(South Korea) Suwon	Free transfer
MF	(Brazil) Oberdan	(Brazil) Figueirense	Free transfer
FW	(Brazil) Jorge Luiz	(Portugal) Feirense	Free transfer
FW	(South Korea) Lee Kyu-min	(South Korea) Pyeongtaek Jinwee	Free transfer
FW	(South Korea) Jo Seong-joon	(South Korea) FC Anyang	Free transfer

Returned from loan

Position	Player	Returned from

==== Out ====
Transfers out

Position	Player	Transferred to	Fee
GK	(South Korea) Cho Sung-hoon	(South Korea) Suwon Samsung Bluewings	Free
GK	(South Korea) Noh Ji-hun	(South Korea) Paju Citizen	Free
DF	(Australia) Alex Grant	(China) Tianjin Jinmen Tiger	Free
DF	(South Korea) Sim Sang-min	(South Korea) Ulsan HD	Free
DF	(South Korea) Kim Yong-hwan	(South Korea) Jeonnam Dragons	Free
DF	(South Korea) Bak Keon-woo	(Japan) Ehime	Free
DF	(South Korea) Ha Chang-rae	(Japan) Nagoya Grampus	Undisclosed
DF	(South Korea) Shin Won-chul	(South Korea) Paju Citizen	Free
MF	(South Korea) Song Han-rok	(South Korea) Paju Citizen	Free
MF	(South Korea) Yang Tae-Ryoul	(South Korea) Jeonju Citizen	Free
FW	(South Korea) Goh Young-jun	(Serbia) FK Partizan	Undisclosed
FW	(Brazil) Zeca	(China) Shandong Taishan	Undisclosed
FW	(South Korea) Lee Hyun-il	(South Korea) Gimpo FC	Free
FW	(South Korea) Kim Seung-dae	(South Korea) Daejeon Hana Citizen	Free

Loaned out

Position	Player	Loaned to	Note
DF	(South Korea) Cho Jae-hun	(South Korea) Jeonnam Dragons	Season loan
DF	(South Korea) Park Seung-wook	(South Korea) Gimcheon Sangmu	Enlisted

Loan return

Position	Player	Loaned to	Note
MF	(Brazil) Oberdan	(Brazil) Figueirense	End of loan

=== Mid-season ===
==== In ====
Transfers in

Position	Player	Transferred from	Fee
DF	(South Korea) Min Sang-gi	(South Korea) Suwon Samsung Bluewings	Free
DF	(South Korea) Lee Tae-seok	(South Korea) FC Seoul	Free
MF	(South Korea) Kim Seo-jin	(South Korea) Ajou University	Free
FW	(South Korea) An Jae-joon	(South Korea) Bucheon	Free transfer

Returned from loan

Position	Player	Returned from	Note
GK	(South Korea) Kang Hyeon-mu	(South Korea) FC Seoul	End of Military Service

==== Out ====
Transfers out

Position	Player	Transferred to	Fee
GK	(South Korea) Kang Hyeon-mu	(South Korea) FC Seoul	Free transfer

Loaned out

Position	Player	Loaned to	Note
DF	(South Korea) Kim Ryun-sung	(South Korea) Busan IPark	Season loan
MF	(South Korea) Kim Jung-hyun	(South Korea) Chungbuk Cheongju	Season loan
MF	(South Korea) Kim Seo-jin	(South Korea) Cheonan City	Season loan
FW	(South Korea) Yoon Jae-Woon	(South Korea) Bucheon	Season loan
FW	(South Korea) Park Su-been	(Spain) CD Leganés B	Season loan

== Competitions ==
=== K League 1 ===
Pos	Team	Pld	W	D	L	GF	GA	GD	Pts	Qualification or relegation (Note: Teams played each other three times (33 matches), before the league was split into two groups, the top six and the bottom six.)
4	FC Seoul	38	16	10	12	55	42	+13	58	Qualification for Champions League Elite league stage
5	Suwon FC	38	15	8	15	54	57	−3	53	
6	Pohang Steelers	38	14	11	13	53	50	+3	53	Qualification for Champions League Two group stage (Note: Qualified as Korea Cup champions.)
7	Jeju United	38	15	4	19	38	54	−16	49	
8	Daejeon Hana Citizen	38	12	12	14	43	47	−4	48	

Source: Soccerway K League
Rules for classification: 1) Points; 2) Goals scored; 3) Goal difference; 4) Wins; 5) Head-to-head points

==== Matches ====
As usual, the league season is played over 38 matches. After 33 league matches between the 12 participating teams, the teams are split into the final round (top 6 teams) and relegation round (bottom 6 teams).

1 March 2024 1	Ulsan HD	1–0	Pohang Steelers	Ulsan
	Esaka 52'	Report	Jorge Luiz (yellow card) 67'; Jonathan Aspropotamitis (red card) 88'; Kim In-sung (yellow card) 90+3'	Stadium: Ulsan Munsu Football Stadium; Attendance: 28,683; Referee: Kim Woo-sung

9 March 2024 2	Pohang Steelers	3–1	Daegu	Pohang
16:30 UTC+9	Jeon Min-kwang 48'; Kim In-sung 53'; Kim Jong-woo 73'; Kim Dong-jin (yellow card) 78'; Yoon Min-ho (yellow card) 90'	Report	Hong Chul 45' (yellow card) 67'	Stadium: Pohang Steel Yard; Attendance: 10,930; Referee: Park Byung-jin

17 March 2024 3	Pohang Steelers	1–0	Gwangju	Pohang
16:30 UTC+9	Jeong Jae-hee 90+3'; Han Chan-hee (yellow card) 28'; Park Chan-yong (yellow card) 45+4'; Yoon Min-ho (yellow card) 80'; Wanderson (yellow card) 90+10'	Report	Jeong Ho-yeon (yellow card) 46'; Heo Yool (yellow card) 66'; Gabriel Henrique (yellow card) 69'	Stadium: Pohang Steel Yard; Attendance: 9,203; Referee: Ko Hyung-jin

30 March 2024 4	Jeju United	0–2	Pohang Steelers	Seogwipo
	Yuri (yellow card) 84'	Report	Jeong Jae-hee 90+2'; Baek Sung-dong 90+6'	Stadium: Jeju World Cup Stadium; Attendance: 6,036; Referee: Kim Chong-hyuk

2 April 2024 5	Pohang Steelers	1–1	Suwon	Pohang
	Oberdan 44'	Report	Lachlan Jackson 52'	Stadium: Pohang Steel Yard; Attendance: 5,143; Referee: Shin Yong-jun

7 April 2024 6	Daejeon Hana Citizen	1–2	Pohang Steelers	Daejeon
16:30 UTC+9	Leandro 44'; Lee Jung-taek (yellow card) 56'	Report	Kim In-sung 80'; Jeong Jae-hee 90'; Lee Ho-jae (yellow card) 83'	Stadium: Daejeon World Cup Stadium; Attendance: 10,761; Referee: Lee Dong-Jun

13 April 2024 7	FC Seoul	2–4	Pohang Steelers	Seoul
	Son Seung-beom 46'; Willyan 64'; Kang Sang-woo (yellow card) 90+6'	Report	Heo Yong-joon 14'; Lee Ho-jae 72'; Park Chan-yong 76'; Jeong Jae-hee 90+3'; Han Chan-hee (yellow card) 38'; Shin Kwang-hoon (yellow card) 45'; Kim Jong-woo (yellow card) 88'	Stadium: Seoul World Cup Stadium; Attendance: 29,051; Referee: Kim Chong-hyuk

20 April 2024 8	Pohang Steelers	0–0	Gimcheon Sangmu	Pohang
		Report	Kim Hyeo-nug (yellow card) 53'	Stadium: Pohang Steel Yard; Attendance: 7,673; Referee: Chae Sang-hyeop

28 April 2024 9	Pohang Steelers	0–0	Incheon United	Pohang
	Oberdan (yellow card) 34' (yellow-red card) 58'	Report		Stadium: Pohang Steel Yard; Attendance: 7,564; Referee: Kim Hee-gon

1 May 2024 10	Gangwon FC	2–4	Pohang Steelers	Chuncheon
19:00	Yang Min-hyuk 75'; Jung Han-min 83'		Jeong Jae-hee 33', 52', 62'; Lee Ho-jae 90'	Stadium: Chuncheon Songam Sports Town; Attendance: 4,157; Referee: Jeong Dong-sik

4 May 2024 11	Pohang Steelers	1–0	Jeonbuk Hyundai Motors	Pohang
16:30 UTC+9	Kim Jong-woo 90+8'; Han Chan-hee (yellow card) 33'	Report		Stadium: Pohang Steel Yard; Attendance: 13,002; Referee: Kim Chong-hyuk

12 May 2024 12	Pohang Steelers	1–1	Jeju United	Pohang
16:30 UTC+9	Hong Yun-sang 12'; Kim Dong-jin (yellow card) 77'; Shin Kwang-hoon (yellow card) 78'	Report	Italo 90'; Han Chong-mu (yellow card) 76'	Stadium: Pohang Steel Yard; Attendance: 9,577; Referee: Ko Hyung-jin

19 May 2024 13	Suwon	1–0	Pohang Steelers	Suwon
16:30 UTC+9	Jeong Seung-won 45'; Park Cheol-woo (yellow card) 77'		Lee Dong-hee (yellow card) 73'; Oberdan (yellow card) 85'	Stadium: Suwon Sports Complex; Attendance: 5,126; Referee: Shin Yong-jun

25 May 2024 14	Pohang Steelers	2–2	FC Seoul	Pohang
16:30 UTC+9	Lee Tae-seok 4' (o.g.); Lee Ho-jae 84'	Report	Stanislav Iljutcenko 41'; Lim Sang-hyub 87'; Lee Seung-joon (yellow card) 8'; Lee Tae-seok (yellow card) 46'; Aleksandar Paločević (yellow card) 90+2'	Stadium: Pohang Steel Yard; Attendance: 13,467; Referee: Jeong Dong-sik

28 May 2024 15	Gwangju FC	0–1	Pohang Steelers	Gwangju
	Park Tae-jun (yellow card) 53'; Kim Jin-ho (yellow card) 90+9'	Report	Kim Dong-jin 4'; Lee Dong-hee (yellow card) 24'; Shin Kwang-hoon (yellow card) 57' (yellow-red card) 68'	Stadium: Gwangju Football Stadium; Attendance: 2,687; Referee: Kim Jong-hyuk

1 June 2024 16	Gimcheon Sangmu FC	3–1	Pohang Steelers	Gimcheon
	Kang Hyun-muk 70'; Yu Kang-hyun 90+7'; Choi Gi-Yun 90+10'; Park Seung-wook (yellow card) 26'; Jeong Chiin (yellow card) 39'	Report	Jorge Luiz 89'; Wanderson (yellow card) 81'	Stadium: Gimcheon Stadium; Attendance: 4,574; Referee: Choi Hyun-jai

15 June 2024 17	Pohang Steelers	1–1	Daejeon Hana Citizen	Pohang
16:30 UTC+9	Hoe Yong-joon 24'; Lee Dong-hee (yellow card) 83'	Report	Lee Dong-hee 14' (o.g.); Aaron Calver (yellow card) 10'; Lee Soon-min (yellow card) 55'	Stadium: Pohang Steel Yard; Attendance: 8,422; Referee: Kim Dae-yong

23 June 2024 18	Incheon United	1–3	Pohang Steelers	Pohang
16:30 UTC+9	Kim Bo-sub 78'	Report	Hoe Yong-joon 26' (yellow card) 3'; Lee Ho-jae 50', 71'	Stadium: Pohang Steel Yard; Attendance: 8,198; Referee: Jeong Dong-sik

26 June 2024 19	Jeonbuk Hyundai Motors	1–1	Pohang Steelers	Jeonju
19:30 UTC+9	Tiago Orobó 16' (yellow card) 77'	Report	Oberdan 20'; Lee Kyu-min (yellow card) 31'	Stadium: Jeonju World Cup Stadium; Attendance: 6,546; Referee: Lee Dong-jun

30 June 2024 20	Pohang Steelers	2–1	Ulsan HD	Pohang
	Hong Yun-sang 2'; Lee Ho-jae 19' (pen.); Baek Sung-dong (yellow card) 90+2'	Report	Ko Seung-beom 25'	Stadium: Pohang Steel Yard; Attendance: 13,079; Referee: Ko Hyung-jin

6 July 2024 21	Daegu FC	3–3	Pohang Steelers	Daegu
	Cesinha 28' (yellow card) 86'; Edgar Bruno 61'; Kyohei Yoshino (red card) 45+2'	Report	Jeong Jae-hee 50'; Hong Yun-sang 54'; Lee Ho-jae 67'; Hoe Yong-joon (yellow card) 41'; Kim Young-gwon (yellow card) 90+7'	Stadium: DGB Daegu Bank Park; Attendance: 11,881; Referee: Kim Jong-hyuk

10 July 2024 22	Pohang Steelers	2–0	Gangwon FC	Pohang
19:30	Oberdan 50'; Yun Min-ho 76'			Stadium: Pohang Steel Yard; Attendance: 5,287; Referee: Park Byung-jin

13 July 2024 23	Jeju United	2–1	Pohang Steelers	Seogwipo
	Reis 62'; Yuri 90+11'; Italo (yellow card) 80'	Report	Hong Yun-sang 59'; Kim Dong-jin (yellow card) 8'; Hong Yun-sang (yellow card) 37'; Heo Yong-joon (yellow card) 75'	Stadium: Jeju World Cup Stadium; Attendance: 4,412; Referee: Kim Yong-woo

21 July 2024 24	Daejeon Hana Citizen	1–2	Pohang Steelers	Daejeon
16:30 UTC+9	Kim Jun-bum 1'	Report	Hong Yun-sang 46' (yellow card) 81'; Lee Ho-jae 48'	Stadium: Daejeon World Cup Stadium; Attendance: 6,635; Referee: Lee Dong-Jun

28 July 2024 25	Pohang Steelers	1–2	Gimcheon Sangmu	Pohang
	Lee Ho-jae 85'	Report	Kim Dae-wan 21'; Yu Kang-hyun 54'; Seo Min-woo (yellow card) 63'; Park Sooil (yellow card) 87'	Stadium: Pohang Steel Yard; Attendance: 13,234; Referee: Chae Sang-hyeop

11 August 2024 26	FC Seoul	1–2	Pohang Steelers	Seoul
	Jeon Ming-wang 50'; Kang Sang-woo (yellow card) 90+6'	Report	Cho Young-wook 3'; Lee Seung-mo 62' (yellow card) 48'; Kang Sang-woo (yellow card) 87'; Ryu Jae-moon (yellow card) 87'	Stadium: Seoul World Cup Stadium; Attendance: 10,719; Referee: Kim Jong-hyuk

17 August 2024 27	Jeonbuk Hyundai Motors	2–1	Pohang Steelers	Jeonju
19:00 UTC+9	Andrigo 44'; Kwon Chang-hoon 90+10'; Kim Jin-gyu (yellow card) 61'; Hong Jeong-ho (yellow card) 89'	Report	Wanderson 72'; Lee Tae-seok (yellow card) 41'	Stadium: Jeonju World Cup Stadium; Attendance: 14,814; Referee: Kim Woo-sung

24 August 2024 28	Pohang Steelers	1–2	Daegu	Pohang
	Dong Sung-Dong 71'	Report	Hwang Jae-Won 49'; Caio Pinheiro 50'; Kyohei Yoshino (yellow card) 63'; Jeong Chi-In (yellow card) 87'; Jang Sung-Won (yellow card) 90'; Park Yong-Hui (yellow card) 90+7'	Stadium: Pohang Steel Yard; Attendance: 10,691; Referee: Jeong Dong-sik

31 August 2024 29	Ulsan HD	5–4	Pohang Steelers	Ulsan
	Hong Yun-sang 10'; Jorge Luiz 84'; Eo Jeong-won 90'; Lee Tae-seok 90+3'; Jung Woo-Young (yellow card) 11'; Won Du-Jae (yellow card) 83'; Ataru Esaka (yellow card) 90'	Report	Giorgi Arabidze 6', 36'; Yago Cariello 58'; Gustav Ludwigson 78'; Kim Young-gwon 88'; Jeon Min-Gwang (yellow card) 64'	Stadium: Ulsan Munsu Football Stadium; Attendance: 22,106; Referee: Kim Hee-gon

13 September 2024 30	Gwangju FC	2–1	Pohang Steelers	Gwangju
	Gabriel Henrique 38' (yellow card) 86'; Choi Kyoung-Rok 71'; Lee Gun-Hee (yellow card) 32'; Lee Hui-Gyun (yellow card) 36'; Ahn Young-Gyu (yellow card) 54'	Report	Wanderson 89'; Lee Seung-Hwan (yellow card) 29'	Stadium: Gwangju Football Stadium; Attendance: 3,136; Referee: Ko Hyung-jin

22 September 2024 31	Pohang Steelers	2–1	Gangwon FC	Pohang
16:30	Tući 5' (o.g.); Jorge Luiz 90+5'		Yang Min-hyuk 90+3'	Stadium: Pohang Steel Yard; Attendance: 9,427; Referee: Song Min-seok

27 September 2024 32	Pohang Steelers	1–0	Incheon United	Pohang
16:30	Jorge Luiz 82'		Matej Jonjic (yellow card) 78'	Stadium: Pohang Steel Yard; Attendance: 6,332; Referee: Kim Dae-young

6 October 2024 33	Pohang Steelers	1–1	Suwon	Pohang
	An Jae-Joon 44'; Eo Jeong-Won (yellow card) 79'; Lee Gyu-Baek (yellow card) 85'	Report	Ji Dong-Won 90'; Roh Kyung-Ho (yellow card) 68'; Jang Yeong-Woo (yellow card) 83'; Kim Tae-Han (yellow card) 83'	Stadium: Pohang Steel Yard; Attendance: 9,513; Referee: Shin Yong-jun

18 October 2024 34	Pohang Steelers	1–1	Suwon	Pohang
	Wanderson 32'; Shin Kwang-Hoon (yellow card) 79'	Report	Kim Ju-Yeop 36'	Stadium: Pohang Steel Yard; Attendance: 4,611; Referee: Choi Hyun-jai

27 October 2024 35	Pohang Steelers	0–2	Ulsan HD	Pohang
	Han Chan-hee (yellow card) 5'; Han Chan-Hee (yellow card) 4'; Lee Gyu-Baek (red card) 52'	Report	Ko Seung-beom 33'; Joo Min-kyu 65'; Choi Kang-Min (yellow card) 31'	Stadium: Pohang Steel Yard; Attendance: 13,212; Referee: Kim Chong-hyuk

2 November 2024 36	FC Seoul	1–1	Pohang Steelers	Seoul
	Kang Sang-woo 32'; Son Seung-Beom (yellow card) 70'	Report	Wanderson 36'; Lee Tae-Seok (yellow card) 74'; Shin Kwang-Hoon (yellow card) 78'	Stadium: Seoul World Cup Stadium; Attendance: 29,377; Referee: Kim Dae-young

10 November 2024 37	Pohang Steelers	0–3	Gimcheon Sangmu	Pohang
	Han Chan-hee (yellow card) 5'; Kim Jong-woo (yellow card) 49'	Report	Lee Dong-Kyeong 47'; Seo Min-Woo 52'; Kim Seung-Sub 70'; Kim Bong-Soo (yellow card) 26'	Stadium: Pohang Steel Yard; Attendance: 8,632; Referee: Kim Hee-gon

23 November 2024 38	Gangwon FC	1–0	Pohang Steelers	Gangneung
14:00	Yang Min-hyeok 36'; Kim Yu-Sung (yellow card) 90+6'	Report	Hong Yun-sang (yellow card) 46'; Han Chan-hee (yellow card) 51'	Stadium: Gangneung Stadium; Attendance: 11,426; Referee: Kim Woo-sung

=== Korean FA Cup ===
19 June 2024 Round of 16	Pohang Steelers	1–1 (a.e.t.) (5–4 p)	Suwon Samsung Bluewings	Pohang
19:00 UTC+9	Baek Sung-dong 114'		Jeon Se-jin 93'	Stadium: Pohang Steel Yard

17 July 2024 Quarter Final	Pohang Steelers	5–1	FC Seoul	Pohang
19:00 UTC+9	Lee Ho-jae 45+2'; Alionço 66'; Jeong Jae-hee 78', 90+2'; Jorge Luiz 86'		Kang Seong-jin 67'	Stadium: Pohang Steel Yard; Attendance: 6,129; Referee: SHIN Yong-jun

21 August 2024 Semi Final leg 1	Jeju United	2–2	Pohang Steelers	Seogwipo
19:00 UTC+9	Kim Ju-gong 4'; Yuri 11'		Jeon Min-gwang 45+5'; Jeong Jae-hee 90+11'	Stadium: Jeju World Cup Stadium; Attendance: 531; Referee: Kim Hee-gon

28 August 2024 Semi Final leg 2	Pohang Steelers	2–1 (4–3 agg.)	Jeju United	Pohang
19:30 UTC+9	An Jae-jun 5'; Eo Jeong-won 81'		Reis 23'	Stadium: Pohang Steel Yard; Attendance: 4,951; Referee: Kim Yong-woo

30 November 2024 Final	Pohang Steelers	3–1 (a.e.t.)	Ulsan HD	Seoul
14:00 UTC+9	Jeong Jae-hee 69'; Kim In-sung 112'; Kang Hyeon-je 120+5'		Joo Min-kyu 38'	Stadium: Seoul World Cup Stadium; Attendance: 27,184; Referee: Young-Woo Kim

=== 2023–24 AFC Champions League ===
==== Knockout stage ====
14 February 2024 Rd 16 Leg 1	Jeonbuk Hyundai Motors (South Korea)	2-0	(South Korea) Pohang Steelers	Jeonju, Korea
19.00 UTC+7	Hernandes Rodrigues 17'; Ahn Hyeon-beom 64'; Tiago Orobó (yellow card) 57'	Report	Shin Kwang-Hoon (yellow card) 7'	Stadium: Jeonju World Cup Stadium; Attendance: 10,966; Referee: Shaun Evans (Australia)

20 February 2024 Rd 16 Leg 2	Pohang Steelers (South Korea)	1-1 (1–3 agg.)	(South Korea) Jeonbuk Hyundai Motors	Pohang, Korea
20.00 UTC+8	Park Chan-yong 12'	Report	Jeong Tae-wook 76'; Lee Yeong-jae (yellow card) 23'; Lee Soo-bin (yellow card) 53'	Stadium: Pohang Steel Yard; Attendance: 5,680; Referee: Khalid Saleh (Saudi Arabia)

=== 2024–25 AFC Champions League Elite ===
Pos	Team	Pld	W	D	L	GF	GA	GD	Pts	Qualification
7	(China) Shanghai Shenhua	8	3	1	4	13	12	+1	10	Advance to round of 16
8	(China) Shanghai Port	8	2	2	4	10	18	−8	8	Advance to round of 16
9	(South Korea) Pohang Steelers	7	2	0	5	9	17	−8	6	
10	(South Korea) Ulsan HD	7	1	0	6	4	16	−12	3	
11	(Australia) Central Coast Mariners	7	0	1	6	8	18	−10	1	

Source: Asian Football Confederation
Rules for classification: 1) points; 2) goal difference; 3) number of goals scored; 4) number of matches won; 5) penalty shoot-out if only two teams remain tied and played each other on the final matchday 6) fair play ranking; 7) drawing of lots

Win Draw Loss

==== League stage ====
17 September 2024 Matchday 1	Shanghai Shenhua (China)	4–1	(South Korea) Pohang Steelers	Shanghai, China
19:00 UTC+8	André Luis 64'; Malele 71', 82'; Gao Tianyi 84'	Report	Han Chan-Hee (yellow card) 45+2'; Lee Tae-Seok (yellow card) 77': Jorge Luiz 53'	Stadium: Shanghai Stadium; Attendance: 23,849; Referee: Salman Ahmad Falahi (Qatar)

1 October 2024 Matchday 2	Pohang Steelers (South Korea)	3–0	(China) Shanghai Port	Pohang, South Korea
19:00 UTC+9	Wanderson 52'; Hong Yun-sang 65'; Han Chan-hee 71'; Kim Jong-Woo (yellow card) 20'; Jeon Min-Gwang (yellow card) 69'; Shin Kwang-Hoon (yellow card) 76'	Report	Willian Popp (yellow card) 76'; Matheus Jussa (red card) 79'	Stadium: Pohang Steel Yard; Attendance: 5,309; Referee: Mooud Bonyadifard (Iran)

22 October 2024 Matchday 3	Buriram United (Thailand)	1–0	(South Korea) Pohang Steelers	Buriram Stadium, Buriram
19:00 UTC+7	Guilherme Bissoli 56'; Kenny Dougall (yellow card) 19'; Osmar Loss (yellow card) 35'; Curtis Good (yellow card) 58'	Report	Lee Gyu-Baek (yellow card) 30'	Attendance: 25,206; Referee: Khalid Saleh Al-Turais (Saudi Arabia)

6 November 2024 Matchday 4	Pohang Steelers (South Korea)	Voided (4–2)	(China) Shandong Taishan	Pohang, South Korea
19:00 UTC+9	Jeong Jae-hee 30'; Jorge Luiz 64'; Wanderson 68'; Oberdan 76'; Yun Pyeong-Gook (yellow card) 90+6'	Report	Chen Pu 33'; Bi Jinhao 90+4'; Tong Lei (yellow card) 29'; Zheng Zheng (yellow card) 55'; Liao Lisheng (yellow card) 83'	Stadium: Pohang Steel Yard; Attendance: 4,620; Referee: Ahmed Al-Kaf (Oman)

27 November 2024 Matchday 5	Yokohama F. Marinos (Japan)	2–0	(South Korea) Pohang Steelers	Yokohama, Japan
	Yan Matheus 41'; Anderson Lopes 90+5'; Eduardo (yellow card) 45+4'	Report	Kim Myeong-Jun (penalty missed) 90+9; Kang Hyeon-Je (yellow card) 76'; Lee Dong-Hyeop (yellow card) 90+4'	Stadium: International Stadium Yokohama; Referee: Abdulrahman Al-Jassim (Qatar)

3 December 2024 Matchday 6	Pohang Steelers (South Korea)	3–1	(Japan) Vissel Kobe	Pohang, South Korea
19:00 UTC+9	Han Chan-hee 13'; Kim In-Sung 20'; Jeong Jae-hee 90+1'	Report	Sasaki 34'; Hotaru Yamaguchi (yellow card) 70'; Yuya Kuwasaki (yellow card) 80'	Stadium: Pohang Steel Yard; Referee: Alireza Faghani (Iran)

11 February 2025 Matchday 7	Pohang Steelers (South Korea)	–	(Japan) Kawasaki Frontale	Pohang, South Korea
19:00 UTC+9				Stadium: Pohang Steel Yard

18 February 2025 Matchday 8	Johor Darul Ta'zim (Malaysia)	–	(South Korea) Pohang Steelers	Johor, Malaysia
				Stadium: Sultan Ibrahim Stadium

== Team statistics ==
=== Appearances and goals ===
As of 3 Dec 2024

No.	Pos.	Player	K-League		FA Cup		AFC Champions League 2023/24 ACL		AFC Champions League Elite 2024/25 ACL Elite		Total	
No.	Pos.	Player	Apps.	Goals	Apps.	Goals	Apps.	Goals	Apps.	Goals	Apps.	Goals
1	GK	(South Korea) Yoon Pyeong-gook	8	0	1	0	0	0	3	0	12	0
2	DF	(South Korea) Eo Jeong-won	15+13	1	3+2	1	2	0	3+3	0	41	2
3	DF	(South Korea) Lee Dong-hee	22+1	0	1	0	1	0	0	0	25	0
4	MF	(South Korea) Jeon Min-gwang	32	2	4	1	0	0	4+1	0	41	3
5	DF	(Australia) Jonathan Aspropotamitis	7+1	0	1+1	0	2	0	4+1	0	17	0
6	MF	(South Korea) Kim Jong-woo	8+17	2	0+3	0	0	0	3	0	31	2
7	FW	(South Korea) Kim In-sung	19+9	2	3+1	1	1+1	0	2+2	1	38	4
8	MF	(Brazil) Oberdan	33+2	3	4+1	1	0	0	4	1	44	5
9	FW	(Brazil) Jorge Luiz	20+14	3	2+1	1	2	0	5	2	44	6
10	MF	(South Korea) Baek Sung-dong	16+19	2	3+2	1	0	0	2+2	0	44	3
11	FW	(South Korea) Jo Seong-joon	3+3	0	0	0	0	0	1+1	0	8	0
12	DF	(South Korea) Kim Ryun-seong	2+2	0	1	0	0+1	0	0	0	6	0
13	MF	(South Korea) Yoon Suk-ju	0+2	0	0	0	1+1	0	0+2	0	6	0
14	FW	(South Korea) Heo Yong-joon	20+3	3	1+2	0	0	0	0	0	26	3
15	FW	(South Korea) Lee Kyu-min	1	0	0+1	0	0	0	0+1	0	3	0
16	MF	(South Korea) Han Chan-hee	22+8	0	3+1	0	2	0	2+2	2	40	2
17	DF	(South Korea) Shin Kwang-hoon	27+1	0	4	0	1+1	0	2	0	36	0
18	FW	(South Korea) Kang Hyeon-Je	3+4	0	0+1	1	0+1	0	1+3	0	13	1
19	MF	(South Korea) Yoon Min-Ho	11+6	1	1+1	0	0	0	0+2	0	21	1
20	FW	(South Korea) An Jae-joon	3+5	1	2	1	0	0	2	0	12	2
21	GK	(South Korea) Hwang In-jae	29	0	4	0	2	0	1+1	0	37	0
22	MF	(South Korea) Kim Gyu-hyeong	0+2	0	0	0	0	0	0+2	0	4	0
23	DF	(South Korea) Lee Dong-hyeop	1	0	0	0	0	0	0+1	0	2	0
26	DF	(South Korea) Lee Tae-seok	9+3	1	1+1	0	0	0	4+1	0	19	1
27	FW	(South Korea) Jeong Jae-hee	11+25	8	1+3	4	0	0	1+3	2	44	14
29	FW	(South Korea) Park Hyeong-Woo	0	0	0	0	0	0	0+1	0	1	0
32	GK	(South Korea) Lee Seung-hwan	1	0	0	0	0	0	1	0	2	0
33	FW	(South Korea) Lee Ho-jae	9+18	9	1+1	1	2	0	0	0	31	10
34	DF	(South Korea) Lee Gyu-baeg	6	0	1	0	0	0	4+1	0	12	0
37	FW	(South Korea) Hong Yun-sang	27+6	6	4	0	0+2	0	4	1	43	7
39	DF	(South Korea) Min Sang-gi	5	0	2	0	0	0	0+1	0	8	0
41	GK	(South Korea) Kang Seong-hyeok	0	0	0	0	0	0	0	0	0	0
55	DF	(South Korea) Choi Hyun-Woung	0+3	0	1	0	0	0	1+1	0	6	0
66	MF	(South Korea) Kim Jun-ho	1	0	0	0	1+1	0	0	0	3	0
70	MF	(South Korea) Hwang Seo-woong	0+1	0	0+1	0	0	0	0+2	0	4	0
77	MF	(Brazil) Wanderson	35+3	4	4+1	0	2	0	3+1	2	49	6
88	MF	(South Korea) Kim Dong-jin	6+12	1	1+1	0	0+2	0	0+3	0	25	1
89	MF	(South Korea) Kim Myung-jun	0+2	0	0	0	0	0	0+2	0	4	0
Players featured on a match but left the club on-loan
14	FW	(South Korea) Heo Yong-joon	0	0	0	0	1	0	0	0	1	0
20	DF	(South Korea) Park Chan-yong	6	1	0	0	2	1	0	0	8	2
30	FW	(South Korea) Yoon Jae-Woon	0	0	1	0	0	0	0	0	1	0
Players featured on a match but left the club mid-season permanently
