= 2026 Pohang Steelers season =

Pohang Steelers
2026 season
- Chairman: Shin Young-gwon
- Manager: Park Tae-ha
- K League 1: TBD
- Korea Cup: TBD
- Champions League Two: TBD
- Champions League Elite: TBD
Home colours	Away colours

The 2026 season is Pohang Steelers' 44th season in the K League 1 in South Korea. Pohang Steelers competed in the K League 1, Korea Cup, and the 2026–27 AFC Champions League Elite after finishing 4th in the league.

== Players ==
No.	Player	Nationality	Date of birth (age)	Previous club	Contract since	Contract end
Goalkeepers
1	Yoon Pyeong-gook	(South Korea)	8 February 1992 (age 34)	(South Korea) Gwangju	2022	2025
21	Hwang In-jae	(South Korea)	22 April 1994 (age 32)	(South Korea) Gimcheon Sangmu	2020	
29	Hong Sung-min	(South Korea)	29 September 2006 (age 20)	Youth Team	2024	
91	Kwon Neung	(South Korea)	13 October 2005 (age 21)	(South Korea) Boin High School	2024	
Defenders
2	Eo Jeong-won	(South Korea)	8 July 1999 (age 27)	(South Korea) Busan IPark	2024	
3	Kim Ye-sung	(South Korea)	21 October 1996 (age 30)	(South Korea) Jeonnam Dragons	2026	
5	Ji Si-woo	(South Korea)	5 August 2002 (age 24)	(South Korea) Jeonbuk Hyundai Motors	2026	
13	Kang Min-jun	(South Korea)	8 April 2003 (age 23)	(South Korea) Korea University	2025	
14	Lee Chang-woo	(South Korea)	12 March 2006 (age 20)	Youth Team	2025	
17	Shin Kwang-hoon	(South Korea)	18 March 1987 (age 39)	(South Korea) Gangwon	2021	2025
20	Park Chan-yong	(South Korea)	27 January 1996 (age 30)	(South Korea) Gimcheon Sangmu	2022	
32	Cho Young-jun	(South Korea)	21 December 2007 (age 18)	Youth Team	2026	
33	Jo Sung-Wook	(South Korea)	22 March 1995 (age 31)	(South Korea) Seongnam FC	2025	
55	Yun Dae-geun	(South Korea)	18 June 2007 (age 19)	(South Korea) Gyeongbuk Yeongdeok High School	2026	
Midfielders
4	Jeon Min-gwang	(South Korea)	17 January 1993 (age 33)	(South Korea) Goyang Citizen	2019	
8	Kim Seung-ho	(South Korea)	1 October 1998 (age 28)	(South Korea) Chungnam Asan	2026	
16	Kim Dong-jin	(South Korea)	30 July 2003 (age 23)	(South Korea) Hannam University	2024	
22	Kim Gwang-won	(South Korea)	6 January 2004 (age 22)	(South Korea) Ulsan University	2026	
26	Kim Beom-jun	(South Korea)	25 May 2007 (age 19)	Youth Team	2026	
30	Kim Yong-hak	(Japan)	30 May 2003 (age 23)	(Portugal) Portimonense	2026	
31	Kento Nishiya	(Japan)	7 November 1999 (age 27)	(Japan) Sagan Tosu	2026	
36	Kim Ho-jin	(South Korea)	25 September 2005 (age 21)	(South Korea) Yong In University	2026	
40	Ki Sung-yueng	(South Korea)	24 January 1989 (age 37)	(South Korea) FC Seoul	2025	
47	Lee Soo-ah	(South Korea)	28 May 2005 (age 21)	(South Korea) Busan IPark	2026	
70	Hwang Seo-woong	(South Korea)	22 January 2005 (age 21)	Youth Team	2024	
77	Wanderson	(Brazil)	3 July 1995 (age 31)	(United Arab Emirates) Al-Ittihad Kalba	2022	2026
Forwards
7	Won Ki-jong	(South Korea)	6 January 1996 (age 30)	(South Korea) Gyeongnam	2026	
9	An Jae-jun	(South Korea)	3 April 2001 (age 25)	(South Korea) Bucheon	2024	
10	Jakob Tranziska	(Germany)	25 June 2001 (age 25)	(Germany) FC Schweinfurt	2026	
11	Juninho Rocha	(Brazil)	5 November 1997 (age 29)	(South Korea) Chungnam Asan	2025	2025
12	Hwang Jae-hwan	(South Korea)	12 April 2001 (age 25)	(South Korea) Chungnam Asan	2026	2026
18	Cho Sang-hyeok	(South Korea)	23 January 2004 (age 22)	(South Korea) Ajou University	2025	
25	Jorge Luiz	(Brazil)	21 June 1999 (age 27)	(Portugal) Feirense	2024	
34	Baek Seung-won	(South Korea)	15 December 2006 (age 19)	Youth Team	2025	
37	Jung Han-min	(South Korea)	8 January 2001 (age 25)	(South Korea) Gangwon	2026	
Players who went out on loan during season
15	Lee Kyu-min	(South Korea)	28 September 2005 (age 21)	(South Korea) Pyeongtaek Jinwee	2024	
23	Lee Seung-Hwan	(South Korea)	5 April 2003 (age 23)	(South Korea) Chungbuk Cheongju	2016	
28	Son Seung-beom	(South Korea)	4 May 2004 (age 22)	(South Korea) FC Seoul	2026	
37	Hong Yun-sang	(South Korea)	19 March 2002 (age 24)	(Germany) 1. FC Nürnberg II	2023	
	Kim Seo-jin	(South Korea)	7 January 2005 (age 21)	(South Korea) Cheonan City	2024	
Players who left mid-season
7	Kim In-sung	(South Korea)	9 September 1989 (age 37)	(South Korea) Seoul E-Land	2023	2025
19	Lee Ho-jae	(South Korea)	14 October 2000 (age 26)	(South Korea) Korea University	2021	2025
24	Han Hyeon-seo	(South Korea)	2 January 2004 (age 22)	(South Korea) Tongmyong University	2025	
71	Lee Heon-jae	(South Korea)	23 March 2006 (age 20)	Youth Team	2025	

== Backroom staff ==
=== Coaching staff ===
- Manager: (South Korea) Park Tae-ha
- Head coach: (South Korea) Kim Jae-sung
- Asst coach: (South Korea) Kim Chi-gon, (South Korea) Kim Seong-jae
- Goalkeeper coach: (South Korea) Kim Lee-sub
- Fitness coach: (Brazil) Myung Baldini, (Brazil) Rafael Cavenaghi
- Match Analyst: (South Korea) Park Cheol-ho

== Transfers ==
=== Pre-season ===
==== In ====
Transfers in

Date	Position	Player	Transferred from	Ref
Permanent Transfer
27 December 2025	MF	(South Korea) Kim Seung-ho	(South Korea) Chungnam Asan	Free
28 December 2025	DF	(South Korea) Kim Ye-sung	(South Korea) Jeonnam Dragons	Free
29 December 2025	MF	(Japan) Kento Nishiya	(Japan) Sagan Tosu	Season loan
31 December 2025	GK	(South Korea) Lee Seung-Hwan	(South Korea) Chungbuk Cheongju	End of loan
31 December 2025	FW	(South Korea) Kim Beom-su	(South Korea) Seongnam	End of loan
3 January 2026	DF	(South Korea) Jo Sung-Wook	(South Korea) Seongnam	Free
6 January 2026	FW	(South Korea) Hwang Jae-hwan	(South Korea) Chungnam Asan	Free
8 January 2026	FW	(South Korea) Son Seung-beom	(South Korea) FC Seoul	Free
9 January 2026	MF	(South Korea) Lee Soo-ah	(South Korea) Busan IPark	Free
10 January 2026	DF	(South Korea) Ji Si-woo	(South Korea) Jeonbuk Hyundai Motors	Exchange for (Brazil) Oberdan
11 January 2026	FW	(South Korea) Jung Han-min	(South Korea) FC Seoul	Free
12 January 2026	FW	(Germany) Jakob Tranziska	(Germany) FC Schweinfurt	Free
Loan Transfer
30 December 2025	FW	(South Korea) Kim Yong-hak	(Portugal) Portimonense	Season loan

==== Out ====
Transfers out

Date	Position	Player	Transferred To	Ref
Permanent Transfer
20 December 2025	DF	(South Korea) Kim Dong-min	(South Korea) Yongin	Free
24 December 2025	DF	(South Korea) Park Seung-wook	(Japan) Shimizu S-Pulse	Free
26 December 2025	DF	(South Korea) Lee Dong-hee	(Japan) Montedio Yamagata	Free
28 December 2025	FW	(South Korea) Park Su-been	(South Korea) Paju	Free
29 December 2025	MF	(South Korea) Cho Jae-hun	(South Korea) Yongin	Free
31 December 2025	DF	(Australia) (Greece) Jonathan Aspropotamitis	(Australia) Macarthur	Free
31 December 2025	DF	(South Korea) Cha Jun-young	(South Korea) Gimhae	Free
31 December 2025	DF	(South Korea) Jo Sung-Wook	(South Korea) Seongnam	End of loan
31 December 2025	MF	(South Korea) Hong Ji-woo	(South Korea)	Free
31 December 2025	FW	(South Korea) Baek Sung-dong	(Thailand) Ayutthaya United	Free
2 January 2026	FW	(South Korea) Kim Beom-su	(South Korea) Jeonnam Dragons	Free
3 January 2026	MF	(South Korea) Kim Jong-woo	(South Korea) Bucheon 1995	Free
5 January 2026	FW	(South Korea) Kang Hyeon-Je	(South Korea) Seoul E-land	Free
8January 2026	MF	(South Korea) Kim Jun-ho	(South Korea) Gyeongnam	Free
10 January 2026	FW	(Brazil) Oberdan	(South Korea) Jeonbuk Hyundai Motors	Undisclosed + (South Korea) Ji Si-woo
Loan Transfer
17 November 2025	MF	(South Korea) Paik Sang-hoon	(South Korea) Dangjin Citizen	Season loan
17 November 2025	MF	(South Korea) Kim Seo-jin	(South Korea) Gimcheon Sangmu	Military Service
17 November 2025	FW	(South Korea) Hong Yun-sang	(South Korea) Gimcheon Sangmu	Military Service
27 December 2025	DF	(South Korea) Lee Dong-hyeop	(South Korea) Cheonan City	Season loan
7 February 2026	FW	(South Korea) Lee Kyu-min	(South Korea) Cheonan City	Season loan

=== Mid-season ===
==== In ====
Transfers in

Date	Position	Player	Transferred from	Ref
Permanent Transfer
30 July 2026	FW	(South Korea) Won Ki-jong	(South Korea) Gyeongnam	Free
31 July 2026	MF	(South Korea) Kim Gwang-won	(South Korea) Ulsan University	Free
Loan Transfer

==== Out ====
Transfers out

Date	Position	Player	Transferred To	Ref
Permanent Transfer
23 June 2026	FW	(South Korea) Kim In-sung	(South Korea) Ansan Greeners	Free
10 July 2026	DF	(South Korea) Han Hyeon-seo	(South Korea) Suwon Samsung Bluewings	Free
30 July 2026	FW	(South Korea) Lee Ho-jae	(Germany) SV Darmstadt 98	Undisclosed
31 July 2026	FW	(South Korea) Lee Heon-jae	(South Korea) Gyeongnam	Free
Loan Transfer
24 June 2026	GK	(South Korea) Lee Seung-Hwan	(South Korea) Chungbuk Cheongju	Season loan
8 July 2026	MF	(South Korea) Son Seung-beom	(South Korea) Hwaseong	Season loan

=== Post-season ===
==== Out ====
Transfers out

Date	Position	Player	Transferred To	Ref
Permanent Transfer
23 June 2026	DF	(South Korea) Shin Kwang-hoon	Retired	N.A.

== Friendly matches ==
Win Draw Loss

=== Tour of Bali (12 Jan - 2 Feb) ===
2026 1	Semen Padang	–	Pohang Steelers	Bali

== Competitions ==
=== Overall record ===
Competition	First match	Last match	Starting round	Final position	Record							
Competition	First match	Last match	Starting round	Final position	Pld	W	D	L	GF	GA	GD	Win %
K League 1			Matchday 1	TBD					—			
Korea Cup			Round of 16	TBD					—			
ACL 2	12 February		Round of 16	TBD					—			
ACLE			Qualifying play-off	TBD					—			
Total					0	0	0	0	0	0	+0	—

Source: Soccerway

=== K League 1 ===
==== Matches ====
As usual, the league season will be played with 38 matches split in two stages. After 33 league matches between the 12 participating teams, the teams are split into the Final Round (Top 6 teams, which aims to won an AFC Champions spot) and Relegation Round (Bottom 6 teams, that aims to survive relegation).

28 February 2026 1	Gimcheon Sangmu	1–1	Pohang Steelers	Gimcheon
	Go Jae-Hyeon 4' (yellow card) 29'	Report	Jakob Tranziska 55'; Hwang Jae hwan (yellow card) 21'; Kento Nishiya (yellow card) 53'; Jeon Min-kwang (yellow card) 64'; Park Chan-Yong (red card) 70'	Stadium: Gimcheon Stadium; Attendance: 4,377; Referee: Kim Dae-yong

28 March 2026 2 (Rescheduled)	Pohang Steelers	1–0	Gangwon	Pohang
	Lee Ho-jae 71'; Hwang In-jae (yellow card) 90+5'	Report	Kang Yun-gu (yellow card) 32'; Lee You-hyeon (yellow card) 63'	Stadium: Pohang Steel Yard; Attendance: 7,385; Referee: Kim Jong-hyeok

15 March 2026 3	Pohang Steelers	1–1	Incheon United	Pohang
	Lee Ho-jae 46'; Lee Chang-woo (yellow card) 36'; Kang Min-jun (yellow card) 89'	Report	Stefan Mugosa 43'; Jeong Chi-in (yellow card) 34'; Juan Ibiza (yellow card) 82'	Stadium: Pohang Steel Yard; Attendance: 10,510; Referee: Seol Tae-hwan

18 March 2026 4	Pohang Steelers	0–1	FC Seoul	Pohang
	Jakob Tranziska (yellow card) 20' (yellow-red card) 45+3'; Han Hyeon-seo (yellow card) 67'; Lee Ho-jae (yellow card) 73'; Shin Kwang-Hoon (yellow card) 76'; Juninho Rocha (yellow card) 90+6'	Report	Cho Young-wook 5'	Stadium: Pohang Steel Yard; Attendance: 4,177; Referee: Shin Yong-jun

22 March 2026 5	Pohang Steelers	0–0	Bucheon	Pohang
	Jeon Min-kwang (red card) 32'; Eo Jeong-won (yellow card) 90'; Juninho Rocha (yellow card) 90+2'	Report	Jeong Ho-jin (yellow card) 68'	Stadium: Pohang Steel Yard; Attendance: 8,012; Referee: Ko Hyung-jin

4 April 2026 6	Pohang Steelers	1–0	Daejeon Hana Citizen	Pohang
	Lee Ho-jae 30' (pen.); Eo Jeong-won (yellow card) 66'	Report	Cho Sung-gwon (yellow card) 16'; Diogo de Oliveira (red card) 27'	Stadium: Pohang Steel Yard; Attendance: 7,625; Referee: Park Byung-Jin

11 April 2026 7	Pohang Steelers	0–2	Jeju	Pohang
	Park Chan-Yong (yellow card) 30'; Kim Yong-hak (yellow card) 77'	Report	Jang Min-gyu 18'; Shin Sang-eun 28'; Kim Jae-woo (yellow card) 84'	Stadium: Pohang Steel Yard; Attendance: 7,827; Referee: Shin Yong-jun

19 April 2026 8	Pohang Steelers	0–1	FC Anyang	Pohang
	Juninho Rocha (yellow card) 16'; Kim Dong-jin (yellow card) 58'; Lee Ho-Jae (yellow card) 90+5'	Report	Choi Geon-Joo 68'; Lee Tae-heui (yellow card) 86'; Kim Jeong-hoon (yellow card) 90+1'; Park Jeong-hun (yellow card) 90+3'	Stadium: Pohang Steel Yard; Attendance: 8,403; Referee: Kim Dong-jun

22 April 2026 9	Pohang Steelers	1–0	Gwangju	Pohang
	Lee Ho-jae 4'; Han Hyeon-seo (yellow card) 49'; Kim Seung-ho (yellow card) 90+1'	Report	Lee Min-ki (yellow card) 89'	Stadium: Pohang Steel Yard; Attendance: 4,533; Referee: Park Byung-Jin

26 April 2026 10	Jeonbuk Hyundai Motors	3–2	Pohang Steelers	Jeonju
	Kim Young-bin 2' (yellow card) 37'; Kim Ha-jun 45' (yellow card) 65'; Kang Sang-yoon 90+5'; Bruno Mota (yellow card) 62'; Lee Seung-woo (yellow card) 88'	Report	Lee Ho-jae 41' (pen.), 67' (pen.); Jeon Min-gwang (yellow card) 51'	Stadium: Jeonju World Cup Stadium; Attendance: 14,501; Referee: Chae Sang Hyeop

2 May 2026 11	Ulsan HD	0–1	Pohang Steelers	Ulsan
		Report	Cho Sang-hyeok 90+5' (yellow card) 90+8'	Stadium: Ulsan Munsu Football Stadium; Attendance: 16,413; Referee: Kim Jong-hyeok

5 May 2026 12	Gangwon	1–1	Pohang Steelers	Gangneung
	Abdallah Hleihel 69'; Lee You-hyeon (yellow card) 45+2'; Kim Do-hyun (yellow card) 58'; Park Ho-young (yellow card) 90+6'	Report	Cho Sang-hyeok 81'; Han Hyeon-seo (yellow card) 45+4'	Stadium: Gangneung Stadium; Attendance: 8,422; Referee: Kim Woo-sung

9 May 2026 13	Daejeon Hana Citizen	0–2	Pohang Steelers	Daejeon
	Kim Moon-hwan (yellow card) 19'; Anton Kryvotsiuk (yellow card) 82'; Victor Bobsin (yellow card) 90'	Report	Juninho Rocha 69', 90+5'; Lee Ho-jae (yellow card) 36'	Stadium: Daejeon World Cup Stadium; Attendance: 7,605; Referee: Ko Hyung-jin

12 May 2026 14	Incheon United	0–1	Pohang Steelers	Incheon
	Choi Seung-gu (yellow card) 34'; Lee Ju-yong (yellow card) 64'; Kim Gun-hee (yellow card) 79'	Report	Lee Ho-jae 42' (pen.); Eo Jeong-won (yellow card) 84'	Stadium: Incheon Football Stadium; Attendance: 6,620; Referee: Seol Tae-hwan

17 May 2026 15	Bucheon	2–0	Pohang Steelers	Bucheon
	Thiaguinho Santos 60'; Lee Eui-hyeong 84'; Ahn Tae-hyun (yellow card) 50'; Kim Jong-woo (yellow card) 52'	Report	Park Chan-Yong (yellow card) 39'; Ahn Tae-hyun (yellow card) 50'; Kim Jong-woo (yellow card) 52'	Stadium: Bucheon Stadium; Attendance: 6,421; Referee: Kim Jong-hyuk

4 July 2025 16	FC Anyang	2–3	Pohang Steelers	Anyang
	Matheus Oliveira Santos 45+4'; Lee Tae-heui 75'; Choe Gyu-hyeon (yellow card) 42'	Report	Wanderson 2', 71'; Lee Ho-jae 76'; Shin Kwang-hoon (yellow card) 32' (yellow-red card) 60'; Han Hyeon-seo (yellow card) 56'; Ki Sung-Yueng (yellow card) 90+6'	Stadium: Anyang Stadium; Attendance: 8,210; Referee: Lee Dong-jun

11 July 2026 17	Gwangju FC	0–3	Pohang Steelers	Gwangju
		Report	Kento Nishiya 31'; Jakob Tranziska 50'; Jung Han-min 72'; Lee Ho-jae (yellow card) 5'; Cho Sang-hyeok (yellow card) 71'; Park Chan-Yong (yellow card) 90+5'	Stadium: Gwangju Football Stadium; Attendance: 3,633; Referee: Song Min-seok

19 July 2026 18	Jeju	2–1	Pohang Steelers	Seogwipo
	Kim Shin-jin 78'; Italo Moreira Barcelos 82'; Jang Min-gyu (yellow card) 35'; Oh Jae-hyeok (yellow card) 37'; Tobias Figueiredo (red card) 86'	Report	Jakob Tranziska 38'; Kim Dong-jin (yellow card) 43'	Stadium: Jeju World Cup Stadium; Attendance: 4,225; Referee: Kim Jong-hyuk

22 July 2026 19	FC Seoul	3–1	Pohang Steelers	Seoul
	Patryk Klimala 36'; Jeong Seung-won 69', 88'	Report	Jakob Tranziska 56'; Shin Kwang-hoon (yellow card) 62'	Stadium: Seoul World Cup Stadium; Attendance: 11,139; Referee: Kim Dae-yong

26 July 2026 20	Pohang Steelers	0–2	Jeonbuk Hyundai Motors	Pohang
	Cho Sang-hyeok (yellow card) 57'	Report	Gytis Paulauskas 43'; Kim Yeong-bin 90+8'; Kim Jin-gyu (yellow card) 22'	Stadium: Pohang Steel Yard; Attendance: 13,147; Referee: Shin Yong-jun

1 August 2026 21	Pohang Steelers	0–1	Gimcheon Sangmu	Pohang
	Kento Nishiya (red card) 62'	Report	Lee Jung-taek 66'	Stadium: Pohang Steel Yard; Attendance: 5,316; Referee: Seol Tae-hwan

8 August 2026 22	Pohang Steelers	0–2	Ulsan HD	Pohang
	Jin Si-woo (yellow card) 36'	Report	Seo Myung-Guan 66'; Yago Cariello 67'; Jo Hyeon-woo (yellow card) 90+4'	Stadium: Pohang Steel Yard; Attendance: 11,453; Referee: Kim Dong-jun

15 August 2026 23	Gwangju FC	1–2	Pohang Steelers	Gwangju
	John Iredale 84'; Ri Yong-Jik (yellow card) 53'; Sin Chang-moo (yellow card) 83'	Report	Jakob Tranziska 38'; Wanderson 90+7'	Stadium: Gwangju Football Stadium; Attendance: 2,452; Referee: Ko Hyung-jin

22 August 2026 24	Pohang Steelers	0–3	Bucheon	Bucheon
	Jorge Teixeira (yellow card) 82'	Report	Jefferson 16'; Vitor Gariel 35'; Kim Sang-jun 90'; Jeon Min-gwang (yellow card) 65'	Stadium: Bucheon Stadium (Note: Location change due to safety inspection of the Pohang Yard Stadium as there was an safety incident during match against Ulsan where the part of the roof drop off and injured a spectator.); Attendance: 4,283; Referee: Song Min-seok

25 August 2026 25	Jeju	1–2	Pohang Steelers	Seogwipo
	Lee Seung-ro 90+2'	Report	Won Ki-jong 15'; Kento Nishiya 49'; Cho Sang-hyeok (yellow card) 45'; Juninho Rocha (yellow card) 80'	Stadium: Jeju World Cup Stadium; Attendance: 2,538; Referee: Park Byung Jin

30 August 2026 26	Pohang Steelers	0–0	Gangwon	Gangneung
	Wanderson (yellow card) 36'	Report	Abdallah Khalaihal (yellow card) 86'	Stadium: Gangneung Stadium (Note: Location change due to safety inspection of the Pohang Yard Stadium as there was an safety incident during match against Ulsan where the part of the roof drop off and injured a spectator.); Attendance: 5,172; Referee: Ko Hyung-jin

5 September 2026 27	Jeonbuk Hyundai Motors	2–0	Pohang Steelers	Jeonju
	Lee Seung-woo 59' (yellow card) 39'; Tiago Orobo 62'; Lee Dong-Jun (yellow card) 16'; Joao Gamboa (yellow card) 68'	Report		Stadium: Jeonju World Cup Stadium; Attendance: 11,716; Referee: Shin Yong-jun

9 September 2026 28	Pohang Steelers	0–0	Gimcheon Sangmu	Sangju
		Report	Lee Jung-taek (yellow card) 43' (yellow-red card) 58'; Kim Min-kyu (yellow card) 70'; Jeon Min-kwang (yellow card) 90+6'	Stadium: Sangju Civic Stadium (Note: Location change due to safety inspection of the Pohang Yard Stadium as there was an safety incident during match against Ulsan where the part of the roof drop off and injured a spectator.); Attendance: 2,207; Referee: Park Byung-Jin

12 September 2026 29	Daejeon Hana Citizen	2–2	Pohang Steelers	Daejeon
	Victor Bobsin 84' (yellow card) 70'; Lee Myung-jae 88'; Lee Soon-min (yellow card) 50'; Kim Bong-soo (yellow card) 50'	Report	Jorge Teixeira 48'; Juninho Rocha 51'	Stadium: Daejeon World Cup Stadium; Attendance: 7,686; Referee: Choi Cheol-jun

20 September 2026 30	Pohang Steelers	2–1	FC Seoul	Sangju
	Kento Nishiya 3'; Hwang Seo-woong 39'; Jorge Teixeira (yellow card) 28'; Yazan Al-Arab (yellow card) 45'; Kim Dong-jin (yellow card) 45+2'; Ki Sung-Yueng (yellow card) 63'	Report	Patryk Klimala 51' (pen.); Hong Sung-min (yellow card) 90+7'	Stadium: Sangju Civic Stadium (Note: Location change due to safety inspection of the Pohang Yard Stadium as there was an safety incident during match against Ulsan where the part of the roof drop off and injured a spectator.); Attendance: 4,034; Referee: Song Min-seok

9 October 2026 31	Incheon United	3–0	Pohang Steelers	Incheon
	Lee Min-Hyeok 17'; Lee Chung-yong 40'; Stefan Mugoša 45+3'	Report	Jorge Teixeira (yellow card) 45'; Park Chan-Yong (yellow card) 65'	Stadium: Incheon Football Stadium; Attendance: 12,189; Referee: Ko Hyung-jin

18 October 2026 32	Pohang Steelers	0–0	FC Anyang	Pohang
	Juninho Rocha (yellow card) 74'; Kim Dong-jin (yellow card) 89'	Report		Stadium: Pohang Steel Yard; Attendance: 9,212; Referee: Choi Hyun-jae

25 October 2026 33	Ulsan HD	2–2	Pohang Steelers	Ulsan
	Kim Young-gwon 61'; Lee Dong-gyeong 68'; Lee Jae-Ik (yellow card) 20'; Lee Jin-hyun (yellow card) 90+6'	Report	Wanderson 2'; Kim Seung-ho 25'; Jorge Teixeira (penalty missed) 90	Stadium: Ulsan Munsu Football Stadium; Attendance: 15,228; Referee: Park Byung-Jin

1 November 2026 34	Pohang Steelers	1–1	Jeju	Pohang
	Wanderson 45+10' (pen.); Juninho Rocha (yellow card) 74'	Report	Emerson Negueba 31'	Stadium: Pohang Steel Yard; Attendance: 3,911; Referee: Seol Tae-hwan

8 November 2026 35	Bucheon	2–2	Pohang Steelers	Bucheon
	Jefferson 85'; Park Jeong-in 90'; Kim Min-jun (yellow card) 90+5'	Report	Patrick William 42' (o.g.); Juninho Rocha 54'; Kang Min-jun (yellow card) 57'; Cho Sang-hyeok (yellow card) 75'; Jorge Teixeira (yellow card) 90+5'	Stadium: Bucheon Stadium; Attendance: 3,585; Referee: Ko Hyung-jin

21 November 2026 36	Pohang Steelers	1–1	FC Anyang	Pohang
	Wanderson 23' (pen.) (yellow card) 87'	Report	Matheus Oliveira 90+5' (pen.); Kim Dong-jin (yellow card) 43'; Kim Ji-hun (yellow card) 81'	Stadium: Pohang Steel Yard; Attendance: 3,911; Referee: Seol Tae-hwan

28 November 2026 37	Pohang Steelers	–	Gwangju	Pohang
		Report		Stadium: Pohang Steel Yard

6 December 2026 38	Gimcheon Sangmu	–	Pohang Steelers	Gimcheon
		Report		Stadium: Gimcheon Stadium

Pos	Team	Pld	W	D	L	GF	GA	GD	Pts	Qualification or relegation (Note: Teams played each other three times (33 matches), before the league was split into two groups, the top six and the bottom six.)
7	Jeju SK	35	12	12	11	41	39	+2	48	
8	FC Anyang	36	11	14	11	43	51	−8	47	
9	Pohang Steelers	36	11	12	13	34	43	−9	45	
10	Gimcheon Sangmu (Note: Military-owned team Gimcheon Sangmu cannot qualify for AFC competitions. Gimcheon Sangmu will be relegated to K League 2 2027 season regardless of their own final place.) (R)	35	6	20	9	35	42	−7	38	Relegation to K League 2
11	Bucheon FC 1995	35	7	12	16	35	51	−16	33	

Updated to match(es) played on 21 November 2026. Source: Soccerway K League
Rules for classification: 1) Points; 2) Goals scored; 3) Goal difference; 4) Wins; 5) Head-to-head points
(R) Relegated

=== 2026–27 Korea Cup ===
19 August 2026 Round of 16	Pohang Steelers	3–1	Jinju Citizen (K4)	Gwangyang
	Jorge Teixeira 38', 70'; Hwang Seo-woong 65'; Cho Sung-wook (yellow card) 9'; Kim Ye-seong (yellow card) 50'	Report	Lee Ho-young 12'; Kim Won-joong (yellow card) 44'	Stadium: Gwangyang Football Stadium (Note: Location change due to safety inspection of the Pohang Yard Stadium as there was an safety incident during match against Ulsan where the part of the roof drop off and injured a spectator.); Attendance: 670; Referee: Ko Min-guk

=== 2025–26 AFC Champions League Two ===
==== Knockout stage ====
12 February 2026 Rd of 16 Leg 1	Pohang Steelers (South Korea)	1–1	(Japan) Gamba Osaka	Pohang, South Korea
	Jorge Teixeira 70'	Report	Ryoya Yamashita 47'; Shinnosuke Nakatani (yellow card) 86'	Stadium: Pohang Steel Yard; Attendance: 4,589; Referee: Ahmad A'Qashah (Singapore)

19 February 2026 Rd of 16 Leg 2	Gamba Osaka (Japan)	2–1 (3–2 agg.)	(South Korea) Pohang Steelers	Osaka, Japan
	Deniz Hümmet 34'; Ryoya Yamashita 41'; Masaaki Higashiguchi (yellow card) 80'	Report	Kento Nishiya 61'	Stadium: Suita City Football Stadium; Attendance: 9,456; Referee: Casey Reibelt (Australia)

=== 2026–27 AFC Champions League Elite ===
==== League stage ====
Win Draw Loss

Pos	Team	Pld	W	D	L	GF	GA	GD	Pts
12	(Thailand) Buriram United	4	0	3	1	2	3	−1	3
13	(Thailand) Port	4	1	0	3	9	14	−5	3
14	(Thailand) Ratchaburi	4	0	1	3	6	10	−4	1
15	(South Korea) Pohang Steelers	4	0	1	3	4	11	−7	1
16	(Australia) Newcastle Jets	4	0	0	4	6	19	−13	0

Updated to match(es) played on 4 November 2026. Source: AFC
Rules for classification: 1) points; 2) goal difference; 3) number of goals scored; 4) number of matches won; 5) penalty shoot-out if only two teams remain tied and played each other on the final matchday 6) fair play ranking; 7) drawing of lots

15 September 2026 1	Beijing Guoan (China)	3–1	(South Korea) Pohang Steelers	Beijing, China
	Chadrac Akolo 2'; Zhang Xizhe 12'; Jeremy Dudziak 46'; Wang Gang (yellow card) 43'; Wang Yu (yellow card) 88'	Report	Jakob Tranziska 6' (pen.); Kim Ho-jin (yellow card) 40'; Jo Seong-uk (yellow card) 52'; Juninho Rocha (yellow card) 67'	Stadium: Workers' Stadium; Attendance: 27,999; Referee: Abdulrahman Al-Jassim (Qatar)

13 October 2026 2	Pohang Steelers (South Korea)	0–2	(Malaysia) Johor Darul Ta'zim	Pohang, South Korea
	Jeon Min-gwang (red card) 44'; Juninho Rocha (yellow card) 45+2'	Report	Marcos Guilherme 49', 89'; Shahab Zahedi (yellow card) 10'; Antonio Glauder (yellow card) 74'	Stadium: Pohang Steel Yard; Attendance: 2,594; Referee: Adham Makhadmeh (Jordan)

28 October 2026 3	Kashima Antlers (Japan)	3–0	(South Korea) Pohang Steelers	Kashima, Japan
	Ryuta Koike 69'; Aleksandar Čavrić 75'; Yuma Suzuki 88'	Report	Juninho Rocha (yellow card) 79'; Ji Si-woo (yellow card) 85'	Stadium: Kashima Soccer Stadium; Attendance: 5,676; Referee: Sadullo Gulmurodi (Tajikistan)

4 November 2026 4	Pohang Steelers (South Korea)	3–3	(Japan) Gamba Osaka	Pohang, South Korea
	Wanderson 55'; Jorge Teixeira 77'; Kim Gwang-won 89'; Park Chan-Yong (yellow card) 57'	Report	Ryotaro Meshino 34'; Eli Adams 69'; Kohshiro Sumi 79'; Soya Fujiwara (yellow card) 51'	Stadium: Pohang Steel Yard; Attendance: 2,853; Referee: Adel Al-Naqbi (United Arab Emirates)

28 November 2026 5	Kyoto Sanga (Japan)	–	(South Korea) Pohang Steelers	Kyoto, Japan
				Stadium: Kyoto Stadium

1 December 2026 6	Pohang Steelers (South Korea)	–	(China) Shanghai Port	Pohang, South Korea
				Stadium: Pohang Steel Yard

10 February 2027 7	Vissel Kobe (Japan)	–	(South Korea) Pohang Steelers	Kobe, Japan
				Stadium: Noevir Stadium Kobe

16 February 2027 8	Pohang Steelers (South Korea)	–	(Japan) Kashiwa Reysol	Pohang, South Korea
				Stadium: Pohang Steel Yard

== Team statistics ==
=== Appearances and goals ===
As of 22 Nov 2026

No.	Pos.	Player	K-League		FA Cup		AFC Champions League Two 2025/26 ACL Two		AFC Champions League Elite 2026/27 ACL Elite		Total	
No.	Pos.	Player	Apps.	Goals	Apps.	Goals	Apps.	Goals	Apps.	Goals	Apps.	Goals
1	GK	(South Korea) Yoon Pyeong-gook	0	0	1	0	0	0	1	0	2	0
2	DF	(South Korea) Eo Jeong-won	26+4	0	0	0	2	0	0	0	32	0
3	DF	(South Korea) Kim Ye-sung	7+1	0	1	0	0	0	2+1	0	12	0
4	MF	(South Korea) Jeon Min-gwang	27+1	0	0	0	2	0	2	0	32	0
5	DF	(South Korea) Ji Si-woo	1+7	0	1	0	1	0	3+1	0	14	0
7	FW	(South Korea) Won Ki-jong	7+4	1	0+1	0	0	0	0	0	12	1
8	MF	(South Korea) Kim Seung-ho	14+16	1	0+1	0	0	0	3+1	0	35	1
9	FW	(South Korea) An Jae-jun	6+5	0	1	0	0+1	0	2+1	0	16	0
10	FW	(Germany) Jakob Tranziska	14+11	5	0	0	0	0	4	1	29	6
11	FW	(Brazil) Juninho Rocha	13+12	4	0	0	2	0	1+1	0	29	4
12	FW	(South Korea) Hwang Jae-hwan	1+1	0	0+1	0	0+1	0	0	0	4	0
13	DF	(South Korea) Kang Min-jun	13+6	0	0+1	0	2	0	2	0	24	0
14	DF	(South Korea) Lee Chang-woo	3+7	0	1	0	0+2	0	1+1	0	15	0
16	MF	(South Korea) Kim Dong-jin	30+5	0	0	0	0+1	0	3+1	0	40	0
17	DF	(South Korea) Shin Kwang-hoon	17+4	0	0	0	0	0	0+1	0	22	0
18	FW	(South Korea) Cho Sang-hyeok	10+11	2	1	0	0+1	0	0+3	0	26	2
20	DF	(South Korea) Park Chan-yong	31+1	0	0	0	2	0	3	0	37	0
21	GK	(South Korea) Hwang In-jae	24	0	0	0	2	0	2	0	28	0
22	MF	(South Korea) Kim Gwang-won	0+4	0	0	0	0	0	0+1	1	5	1
23	GK	(South Korea) Lee Seung-Hwan	0	0	0	0	0	0	0	0	0	0
25	FW	(Brazil) Jorge Teixeira	11+7	1	0+1	2	2	1	2+2	1	25	5
26	MF	(South Korea) Kim Beom-jun	0	0	1	0	0	0	0	0	1	0
29	GK	(South Korea) Hong Sung-min	12	0	0	0	0	0	1	0	13	0
30	MF	(South Korea) Kim Yong-hak	4+5	0	0	0	0+2	0	0+2	0	13	0
31	MF	(Japan) Kento Nishiya	23+7	3	1	0	2	1	4	0	37	4
32	DF	(South Korea) Cho Young-jun	0	0	0	0	0	0	0	0	0	0
33	DF	(South Korea) Jo Sung-Wook	0+2	0	1	0	0	0	2	0	5	0
34	FW	(South Korea) Baek Seung-won	0	0	0	0	0	0	0	0	0	0
36	MF	(South Korea) Kim Ho-jin	13+2	0	0	0	0	0	1	0	16	0
37	FW	(South Korea) Jung Han-min	2+9	1	0	0	0	0	2	0	12	1
40	MF	(South Korea) Ki Sung-yueng	19+10	0	0	0	2	0	1+1	0	33	0
47	MF	(South Korea) Lee Soo-ah	0	0	1	0	0	0	0	0	1	0
55	DF	(South Korea) Yun Dae-geun	0	0	0	0	0	0	0	0	0	0
70	MF	(South Korea) Hwang Seo-woong	24+6	1	1	1	1+1	0	0	0	33	2
71	FW	(South Korea) Lee Heon-jae	0+1	0	0	0	0	0	0	0	1	0
77	MF	(Brazil) Wanderson	19+10	6	0	0	0	0	2+1	1	32	7
91	GK	(South Korea) Kwon Neung	0	0	0	0	0	0	0	0	0	0
Players featured on a match for the team, but left the club on loan transfer
15	FW	(South Korea) Lee Kyu-min	0	0	0	0	0	0	0	0	0	0
28	MF	(South Korea) Son Seung-beom	0+1	0	0	0	0	0	0	0	1	0
Players featured on a match for the team, but left the club mid season
7	FW	(South Korea) Kim In-sung	1	0	0	0	0	0	0	0	1	0
19	FW	(South Korea) Lee Ho-jae	18+2	8	0	0	2	0	0	0	22	8
24	DF	(South Korea) Han Hyeon-seo	7+1	0	0	0	0	0	0	0	8	0
