= 2024 Korea Cup =

2024 Hana Bank Korea Cup

Tournament details
- Country: South Korea
- Dates: 9 March – 30 November 2024
- Teams: 59

Final positions
- Champions: Pohang Steelers (6th title)
- Runners-up: Ulsan HD
- Champions League Two: Pohang Steelers

Tournament statistics
- Matches played: 60
- Goals scored: 187 (3.12 per match)
- Top goal scorer: Jeong Jae-hee (4 goals)

Awards
- Best player: Kim In-sung

The 2024 Korea Cup, known as the 2024 Hana Bank Korea Cup (Korean: 2024 하나은행 코리아컵) for sponsorship reasons, was the 29th edition of the Korea Cup and first season renamed from Korean FA Cup. The winners could qualify for the 2025–26 AFC Champions League Elite (if they finish top four in the 2024 K League 1) or 2025–26 AFC Champions League Two (if they finish outside the top four in the 2024 K League 1). Pohang Steelers were the defending champions, having won their fifth cup title the previous year. They successfully defended their title by beating Ulsan HD 3–1 in the final for their sixth title.

== Schedule ==
The draw was held on 23 February 2024 at the Soccer Hall in Seoul. It decided all the match-ups from the first round to the fourth round (round of 16) along with the playing dates.

| Round | Date | Matches | Clubs remaining | Clubs involved | New entries this round |
|---|---|---|---|---|---|
| First round | 9–10 March | 15 | 59 | 30 | 11 K3 League teams 11 K4 League teams 8 K5 League teams |
| Second round | 23–24 March | 16 | 44 | 15+17 | 13 K League 2 teams 4 K3 League teams |
| Third round | 17 April | 12 | 28 | 16+8 | 8 K League 1 teams |
| Round of 16 | 19 June | 8 | 16 | 12+4 | 3 Champions League Elite teams 1 Champions League Two team |
| Quarter-finals | 17 July | 4 | 8 | 8 | None |
| Semi-finals | 21–28 August | 4 | 4 | 4 | None |
| Final | 30 November | 1 | 2 | 2 | None |

== Bracket ==
Round of 16 (Fourth round)
Pohang Steelers (p) | 1 (5)
Suwon Samsung Bluewings | 1 (4)
FC Seoul (p) | 0 (5)
Gangwon FC | 0 (4)
Gimpo FC | 1
Jeonbuk Hyundai Motors | 0
Daejeon Hana Citizen | 0 (7)
Jeju United (p) | 0 (8)
Bucheon FC 1995 | 2
Gwangju FC | 3
Seongnam FC (p) | 1 (5)
Chungbuk Cheongju | 1 (4)
Ulsan HD (p) | 4 (3)
Gyeongnam FC | 4 (0)
Incheon United (p) | 0 (4)
Gimcheon Sangmu | 0 (3)

Quarter-finals (Fifth round)
Pohang Steelers | 5
FC Seoul | 1
Gimpo FC | 0
Jeju United | 1
Gwangju FC (a.e.t.) | 3
Seongnam FC | 2
Ulsan HD | 1
Incheon United | 0

Semi-finals (Sixth round)
Pohang Steelers | 2 | 2 | 4
Jeju United | 2 | 1 | 3
Gwangju FC | 0 | 2 | 2
Ulsan HD | 1 | 2 | 3

Final (Seventh round)
Pohang Steelers (a.e.t.) | 3
Ulsan HD | 1

== First round ==
| Team 1 | Score | Team 2 |
|---|---|---|
| Jeonbuk Jeonju OFC (5) | 1–9 | Gyeongju KHNP (3) |
| Chuncheon FC (3) | 2–0 | Jeonju Citizen (4) |
| Daejeon Korail (3) | 3–1 | Dangjin Citizen (4) |
| Daegu Dalseo Cheongsol (5) | 0–4 | Yeoju FC (3) |
| Seoul Gwanak Byeoksan Players (5) | 4–2 (a.e.t.) | FC Chungju (4) |
| Siheung Citizen (3) | 3–2 | Seoul Nowon United (4) |
| Jinju Citizen (4) | 5–1 | Sinan FC (5) |
| Yangsan Eogok (5) | 2–1 (a.e.t.) | FC Sejong (4) |
| Changwon FC (3) | 8–0 | Yangju Dukgye (5) |
| Daejeon Yuseong Seobu (5) | 1–6 | Busan Transportation Corporation (3) |
| Yangpyeong FC (3) | 0–3 | Pocheon Citizen (3) |
| Seoul Seongdong FC Together (5) | 1–6 | Geoje Citizen (4) |
| Paju Citizen (3) | 2–1 | Namyangju FC (4) |
| Gangneung Citizen (3) | 4–0 | Seoul Jungnang (4) |
| Pyeongtaek Citizen (4) | 3–3 (a.e.t.) (5–4 p) | Pyeongchang United (4) |

== Second round ==
| Team 1 | Score | Team 2 |
|---|---|---|
| Gyeongju KHNP (3) | 0–1 | Ansan Greeners (2) |
| Suwon Samsung Bluewings (2) | 2–1 | Chuncheon FC (3) |
| Daejeon Korail (3) | 1–1 (a.e.t.) (3–5 p) | Seoul E-Land (2) |
| Hwaseong FC (3) | 2–0 | Yeoju FC (3) |
| Seoul Gwanak Byeoksan Players (5) | 1–3 | Gimpo FC (2) |
| FC Anyang (2) | 1–0 | Siheung Citizen (3) |
| Jinju Citizen (4) | 1–0 | Chungnam Asan (2) |
| Cheonan City (2) | 4–0 | Yangsan Eogok (5) |
| Changwon FC (3) | 0–1 | FC Mokpo (3) |
| Bucheon FC 1995 (2) | 2–1 | Busan Transportation Corporation (3) |
| Pocheon Citizen (3) | 0–3 | Seongnam FC (2) |
| Chungbuk Cheongju (2) | 2–0 | Geoje Citizen (4) |
| Paju Citizen (3) | 0–1 | Gyeongnam FC (2) |
| Jeonnam Dragons (2) | 1–0 | Gangneung Citizen (3) |
| Pyeongtaek Citizen (4) | 1–5 | Gimhae FC (3) |
| Busan IPark (2) | 0–0 (a.e.t.) (4–2 p) | Ulsan Citizen (3) |

== Third round ==
| Team 1 | Score | Team 2 |
|---|---|---|
| Ansan Greeners (2) | 0–1 | Suwon Samsung Bluewings (2) |
| Seoul E-Land (2) | 0–1 | FC Seoul (1) |
| Gangwon FC (1) | 3–1 (a.e.t.) | Hwaseong FC (3) |
| FC Anyang (2) | 0–1 (a.e.t.) | Gimpo FC (2) |
| Jinju Citizen (4) | 0–2 | Daejeon Hana Citizen (1) |
| Jeju United (1) | 2–2 (a.e.t.) (4–3 p) | Cheonan City (2) |
| FC Mokpo (3) | 1–2 | Bucheon FC 1995 (2) |
| Seongnam FC (2) | 1–0 | Suwon FC (1) |
| Daegu FC (1) | 1–2 (a.e.t.) | Chungbuk Cheongju (2) |
| Gyeongnam FC (2) | 1–0 | Jeonnam Dragons (2) |
| Incheon United (1) | 1–0 | Gimhae FC (3) |
| Gimcheon Sangmu (1) | 3–2 (a.e.t.) | Busan IPark (2) |

== Round of 16 ==
| Team 1 | Score | Team 2 |
|---|---|---|
| Pohang Steelers (1) | 1–1 (a.e.t.) (5–4 p) | Suwon Samsung Bluewings (2) |
| FC Seoul (1) | 0–0 (a.e.t.) (5–4 p) | Gangwon FC (1) |
| Gimpo FC (2) | 1–0 | Jeonbuk Hyundai Motors (1) |
| Daejeon Hana Citizen (1) | 0–0 (a.e.t.) (7–8 p) | Jeju United (1) |
| Bucheon FC 1995 (2) | 2–3 | Gwangju FC (1) |
| Seongnam FC (2) | 1–1 (a.e.t.) (5–4 p) | Chungbuk Cheongju (2) |
| Ulsan HD (1) | 4–4 (a.e.t.) (3–0 p) | Gyeongnam FC (2) |
| Incheon United (1) | 0–0 (a.e.t.) (4–3 p) | Gimcheon Sangmu (1) |

== Quarter-finals ==
| 17 July 2024 | Ulsan HD (1) | 1–0 | Incheon United (1) | Ulsan |
| 19:00 UTC+9 | Kim Min-jun 27' | | | Stadium: Ulsan Munsu Football Stadium; Attendance: 4.498; Referee: Kim Jong-hyeok |

| 17 July 2024 | Gimpo FC (2) | 0–1 | Jeju United (1) | Gimpo |
| 19:00 UTC+9 | | | Yuri 90+4' | Stadium: Gimpo Solteo Football Field; Attendance: 1,508; Referee: Ko Hyung-jin |

| 17 July 2024 | Pohang Steelers (1) | 5–1 | FC Seoul (1) | Pohang |
| 19:00 UTC+9 | Lee Ho-jae 45+2'; Alionço 66'; Jeong Jae-hee 78', 90+2'; Jorge Luiz 86' | | Kang Seong-jin 67' | Stadium: Pohang Steel Yard; Attendance: 6,129; Referee: Shin Yong-jun |

| 17 July 2024 | Gwangju FC (1) | 3–2 (a.e.t.) | Seongnam FC (2) | Gwangju |
| 19:00 UTC+9 | Shin Chang-mu 23', 45+1'; João Magno 120+1' | | Lee Jung-min 89'; Ruiz 90+1' | Stadium: Gwangju Football Stadium; Attendance: 1,085; Referee: Kim Yong-woo |

== Semi-finals ==
| 21 August 2024 First leg | Jeju United (1) | 2–2 | Pohang Steelers (1) | Seogwipo |
| 19:00 UTC+9 | Kim Ju-gong 4'; Yuri 11' | | Jeon Min-gwang 45+5'; Jeong Jae-hee 90+11' | Stadium: Jeju World Cup Stadium; Attendance: 531; Referee: Kim Hee-gon |

| 21 August 2024 First leg | Gwangju FC (1) | 0–1 | Ulsan HD (1) | Gwangju |
| 19:00 UTC+9 | | | Cariello 55' | Stadium: Gwangju Football Stadium; Attendance: 1,500; Referee: Park Byeong-jin |

| 28 August 2024 Second leg | Pohang Steelers (1) | 2–1 (4–3 agg.) | Jeju United (1) | Pohang |
| 19:30 UTC+9 | An Jae-jun 5'; Eo Jeong-won 81' | | Reis 23' | Stadium: Pohang Steel Yard; Attendance: 4,951; Referee: Kim Yong-woo |

| 28 August 2024 Second leg | Ulsan HD (1) | 2–2 (3–2 agg.) | Gwangju FC (1) | Ulsan |
| 19:00 UTC+9 | Lim Jong-eun 13'; Matheus Sales 54' | | Oh Hu-seong 47', 90' | Stadium: Ulsan Munsu Football Stadium; Attendance: 5,201; Referee: Shin Yong-jun |

== Final ==
30 November 2024
15:00 UTC+9

| Pohang Steelers | 3–1 (a.e.t.) | Ulsan HD |
|---|---|---|
| Jeong Jae-hee 69'; Kim In-sung 112'; Kang Hyeon-je 120+5' | Report | Joo Min-kyu 38' |

Seoul World Cup Stadium, Seoul
Attendance: 27,184
Referee: Kim Young-woo

== See also ==
- 2024 in South Korean football
