= Byeon Jun-byum =

South Korean footballer (born 1991)

Personal information
- Full name: Byeon Jun-byum
- Date of birth: 5 February 1991 (age 35)
- Place of birth: Jeju City, South Korea
- Height: 1.85 m (6 ft 1 in)
- Position: Defender

Youth career
- Daykey High School
- 2010–2013: Konkuk University

Senior career*
Years	Team	Apps	(Gls)
2014–2016	Sanfrecce Hiroshima	0	(0)
2016	→ Shimizu S-Pulse (loan)	17	(1)
2016–2017	Shimizu S-Pulse	0	(0)
2017	→ Zweigen Kanazawa (loan)	5	(0)
2018	Ventforet Kofu	16	(0)
2019–2021	Seoul E-Land	23	(0)
2020–2021	→ Jeonju Citizen FC (loan)		
- * Club domestic league appearances and goals as of 21 January 2022

- Byeon Jun-byum
- Hangul: 변준범
- RR: Byeon Junbeom
- MR: Pyŏn Chunbŏm

Byeon Jun-byum (Korean: 변준범; Japanese: ビョン ジュンボン; born 5 February 1991) is a South Korean footballer.

== Club statistics ==
Updated as of 23 February 2018.

Club performance			League		Cup		League Cup		Continental		Total	
Season	Club	League	Apps	Goals	Apps	Goals	Apps	Goals	Apps	Goals	Apps	Goals
Japan			League		Emperor's Cup		J.League Cup		AFC		Total	
2014	Sanfrecce Hiroshima	J1 League	0	0	1	0	0	0	0	0	1	0
2015	Sanfrecce Hiroshima	J1 League	0	0	1	1	2	0	—		3	1
2016	Shimizu S-Pulse	J2 League	17	1	2	0	—		—		19	1
2017	Shimizu S-Pulse	J1 League	0	0	0	0	4	0	—		4	0
2017	Zweigen Kanazawa	J2 League	5	0	0	0	—		—		5	0
Career total			22	1	4	1	6	0	0	0	32	2
