= Hwang Jae-hwan =

South Korean footballer

Personal information
- Date of birth: 12 April 2001 (age 25)
- Place of birth: Seoul, South Korea
- Height: 1.72 m (5 ft 8 in)
- Positions: Attacking midfielder; winger

Team information
- Current team: Pohang Steelers
- Number: 12

Youth career
- 2014–2016: Hyundai Middle School (Youth)
- 2017–2019: Hyundai High School (Youth)
- 2020: 1. FC Köln

Senior career*
Years	Team	Apps	(Gls)
2020–2024	Ulsan Hyundai	19	(2)
2020–2022	→ 1. FC Köln II (loan)	25	(5)
2024	→ Bucheon FC 1995 (loan)	12	(0)
2025	Gwangju FC	2	(0)
2025	Chungnam Asan	1	(0)
2026–	Pohang Steelers	2	(0)
- * Club domestic league appearances and goals as of 3 August 2026

Hwang Jae-hwan (Korean: 황재환; born 12 April 2001) is a South Korean footballer who plays as a midfielder or winger for Pohang Steelers.

== Career ==
Hwang started his career with South Korean top flight side Ulsan, helping them win the league. Before the second half of 2019–20, he was sent on loan to 1. FC Köln II in the German fourth tier.
