= Kim Ryun-seong =

South Korean footballer (born 2002)

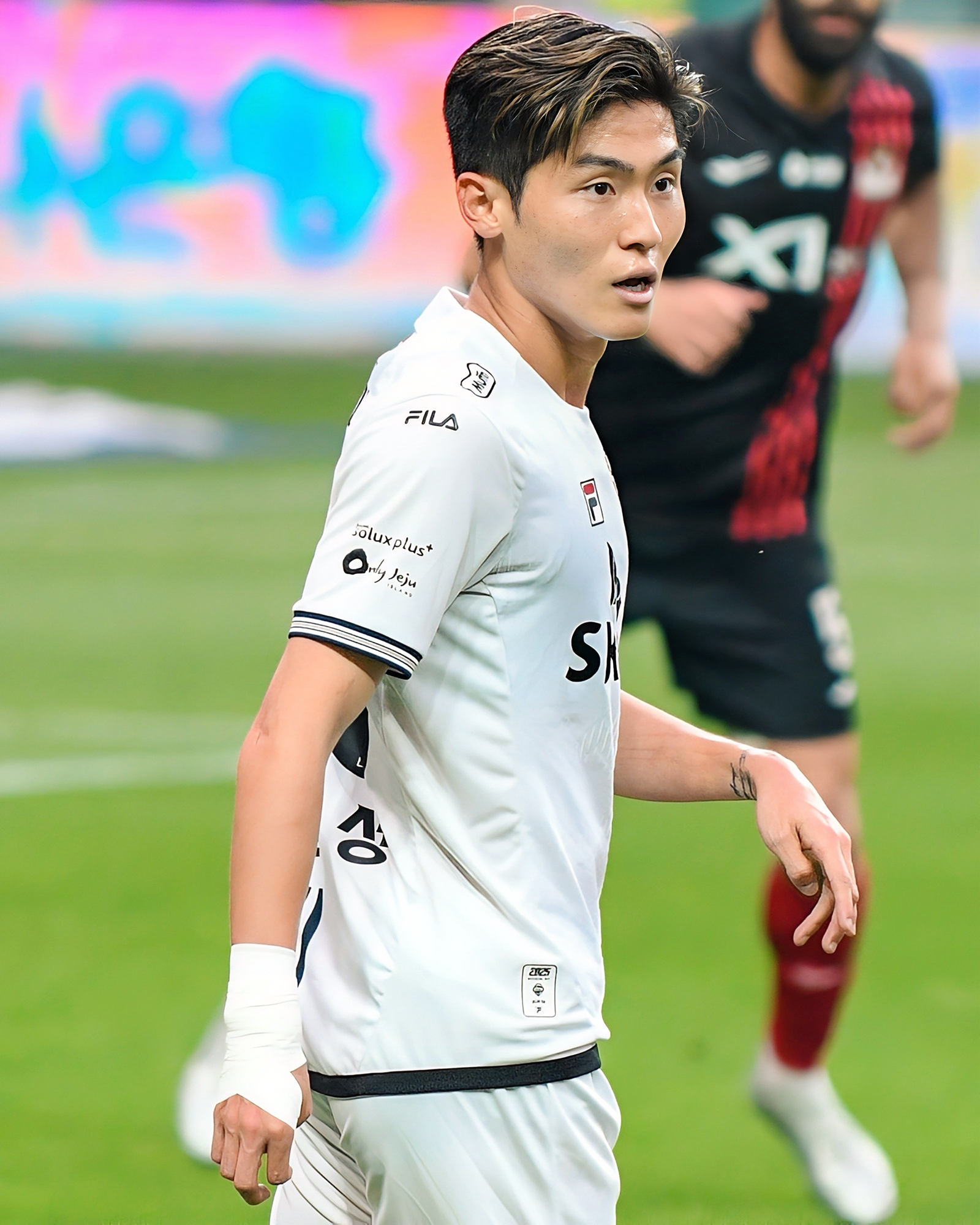
- Kim in 2025

Personal information
- Date of birth: 4 June 2002 (age 24)
- Place of birth: South Korea
- Height: 1.79 m (5 ft 10 in)
- Position: Defender

Team information
- Current team: Jeju SK
- Number: 40

Youth career
- 2018–2020: Pohang Steel High School

Senior career*
Years	Team	Apps	(Gls)
2021–	Pohang Steelers	17	(0)
2022–2023	Gimcheon Sangmu (army)	15	(0)
2024	Busan IPark	11	(0)
2025–	Jeju SK	55	(2)

International career
2017–2019	South Korea U17	13	(0)
- * Club domestic league appearances and goals as of 3 August 2026

- Kim Ryun-seong
- Hangul: 김륜성
- Hanja: 金侖成
- RR: Gim Ryunseong
- MR: Kim Ryunsŏng

Kim Ryun-seong (Korean: 김륜성; born 4 June 2002) is a South Korean footballer who plays as a defender for Jeju SK.
