= Jo Seong-joon =

South Korean footballer

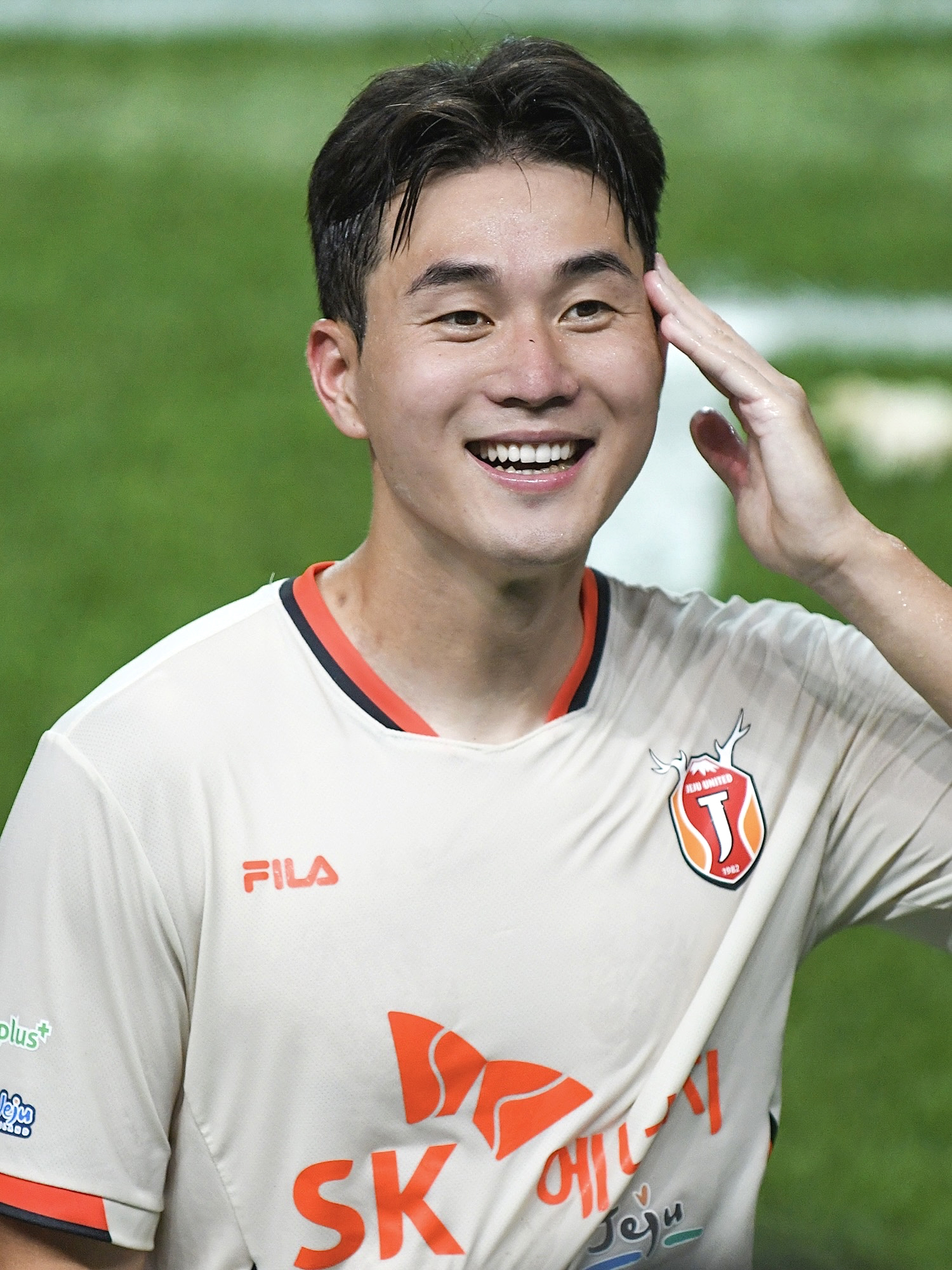
- Jo in August 2022

Personal information
- Full name: Jo Seong-joon
- Date of birth: 27 November 1990 (age 35)
- Place of birth: South Korea
- Height: 1.76 m (5 ft 9 1/2 in)
- Position: Midfielder

Team information
- Current team: Bucheon
- Number: 83

Youth career
- 2009–2012: Cheongju University

Senior career*
Years	Team	Apps	(Gls)
2013–2015	FC Anyang	82	(10)
2016–2018	Gwangju FC	32	(1)
2017–2018	→ Asan Mugunghwa (army)	32	(5)
2019	Seongnam FC	14	(1)
2020–2022	Jeju United FC	53	(1)
2023	FC Anyang	27	(3)
2024	Pohang Steelers	6	(0)
2025	Gimpo	29	(1)
2026	Yangcheon TNT		
2026–	Bucheon	0	(0)
- * Club domestic league appearances and goals as of 4 August 2026

Jo Seong-joon (Korean: 조성준; born 27 November 1990) is a South Korean footballer who plays as forward for Bucheon in K League 1.

== Career ==
He was selected by FC Anyang in the 2013 K League draft.
