= Hong Yun-sang =

South Korean footballer

- Hong with Gimcheon Sangmu in 2026

Personal information
- Date of birth: 19 March 2002 (age 24)
- Place of birth: Jeju City, South Korea
- Height: 1.77 m (5 ft 10 in)
- Position: Winger

Team information
- Current team: Gimcheon Sangmu
- Number: 48

Youth career
- –2021: Pohang Steelers

Senior career*
Years	Team	Apps	(Gls)
2021–2023	VfL Wolfsburg	0	(0)
2021–2022	→ SKN St. Pölten (loan)	15	(3)
2022	→ SKN St. Pölten II (loan)	2	(1)
2022–2023	→ 1. FC Nürnberg II (loan)	26	(7)
2023–	Pohang Steelers	74	(11)
2025–	→ Gimcheon Sangmu (army)	12	(2)

International career^{‡}
2017–2019	South Korea U17	11	(4)
2022–2024	South Korea U23	10	(2)
- * Club domestic league appearances and goals as of 4 August 2026 ‡ National team caps and goals as of 26 April 2024

Hong Yun-sang (Korean: 홍윤상; born 19 March 2002) is a South Korean professional footballer who plays as a winger for South Korean club Gimcheon Sangmu.

== Career ==
Before the second half of 2020–21, Hong signed for German Bundesliga side VfL Wolfsburg from the youth academy of Pohang Steelers in South Korea. In 2021, he was sent on loan to Austrian club SKN St. Pölten. On 30 July 2021, he debuted for St. Pölten during a 1–2 loss to FC Liefering.

On 24 June 2022, Hong moved to 1. FC Nürnberg II on a two-year loan.
