= Daykey High School =

Coordinates: 33.49291°N 126.592721°E

- 대기고등학교

Location
- 453-6 Beonyeong-ro, 1800 Bonggae-dong; Jeju; South Korea

Information
- School type: Private, high school
- Motto: 자강 자율 자립
- Established: 1983; 43 years ago
- Principal: Kim, Chang-Jin
- Chairman of the board: Kim, Pyeong-Hae
- Faculty: 75 (2013)
- Grades: 10–12
- Enrollment: 1210 (2013)
- Campus: Rural
- Campus size: 37,000 m^{2} (9.1 acres)
- Website: daykey.hs.kr

Daykey High School (Korean: 대기고등학교; Hanja: 大起高等學校) is a private high school located in Jeju, South Korea. It was established in 1983.
