= Jeong Jae-hee =

South Korean footballer (born 1994)

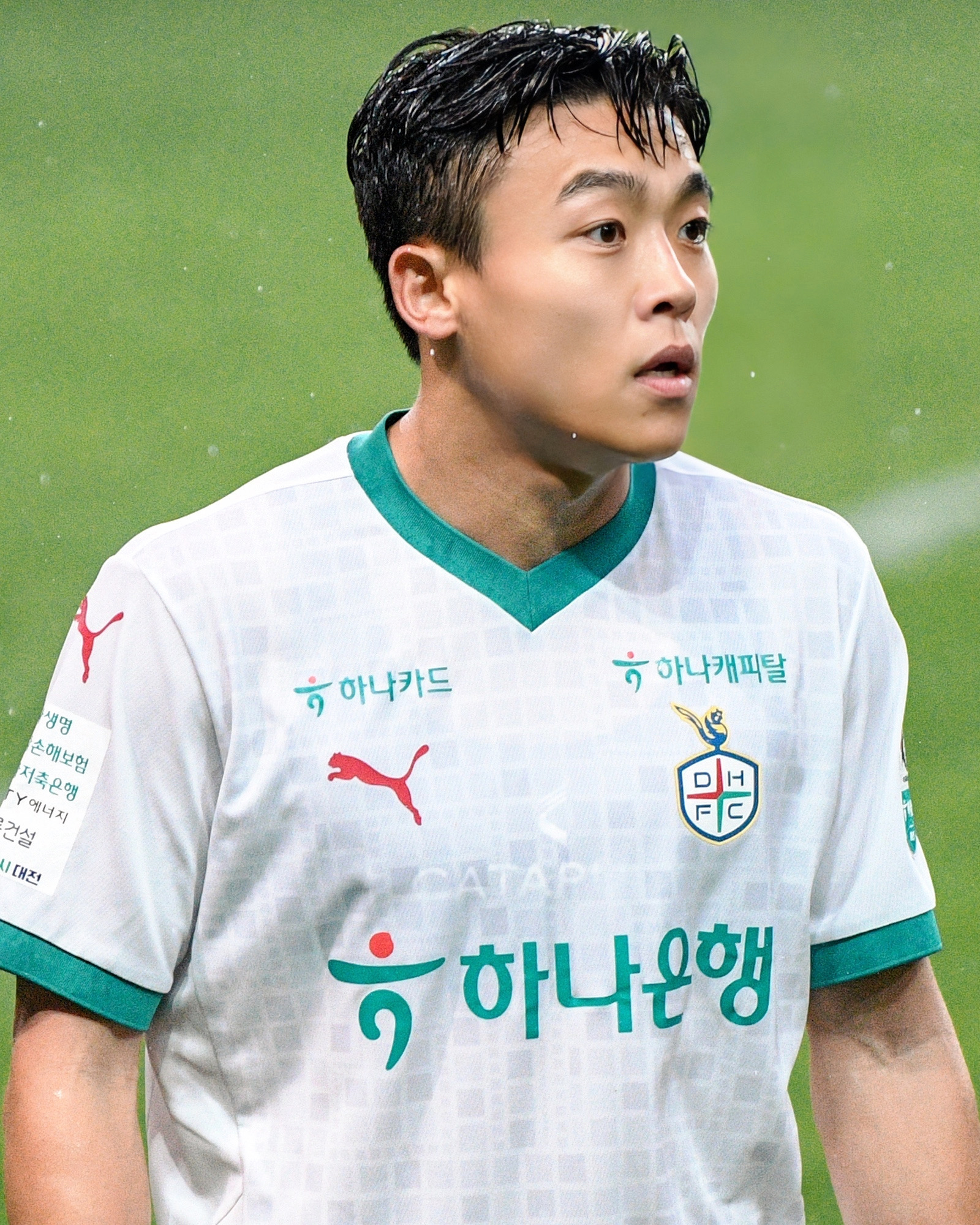
- Jeong in 2025

Personal information
- Full name: Jeong Jae-hee
- Date of birth: 28 April 1994 (age 32)
- Place of birth: South Korea
- Height: 1.74 m (5 ft 8 1/2 in)
- Position: Winger

Team information
- Current team: Daejeon Hana Citizen
- Number: 27

Youth career
- 2013–2015: Sangji University

Senior career*
Years	Team	Apps	(Gls)
2016–2018	FC Anyang	101	(12)
2019–2021	Jeonnam Dragons	32	(5)
2020–2021	→ Sangju / Gimcheon Sangmu (army)	34	(7)
2022–2024	Pohang Steelers	80	(17)
2025–	Daejeon Hana Citizen	38	(6)
- * Club domestic league appearances and goals as of 3 August 2026

Jeong Jae-hee (Korean: 정재희; born 28 April 1994) is a South Korean footballer who plays as midfielder for Daejeon Hana Citizen in K League 1.

== Career ==
Jeong joined K League Challenge side FC Anyang in January 2016.

After finishing his military service in Gimcheon Sangmu, he returned to Jeonnam Dragons and led the team to the 2021 Korean FA Cup winners and selected as the MVP of the tournament.

For the 2022 season, he joined Pohang Steelers.
