= Yoon Pyeong-gook =

South Korean footballer (born 1992)

Yoon Pyeong-guk
Personal information
- Full name: Yoon Pyeong-guk
- Date of birth: 8 February 1992 (age 34)
- Place of birth: South Korea
- Height: 1.89 m (6 ft 2 in)
- Position: Goalkeeper

Team information
- Current team: Pohang Steelers
- Number: 1

Senior career*
Years	Team	Apps	(Gls)
2013-2016	Incheon United	0	(0)
2015–2016	→ Sangju Sangmu (army)	2	(0)
2017–2021	Gwangju FC	78	(0)
2022–	Pohang Steelers	29	(0)
- * Club domestic league appearances and goals as of 5 January 2026

Yoon Pyeong-guk (Korean: 윤평국; born 8 February 1992) is a South Korean footballer who plays for Pohang Steelers.
