= Kim Jun-ho (footballer) =

Korean association football player (born 2002)

Personal information
- Date of birth: 11 December 2002 (age 23)
- Place of birth: South Korea
- Height: 1.82 m (6 ft 0 in)
- Position: Midfielder

Team information
- Current team: Gyeongnam FC
- Number: 28

Youth career
- 2013–2021: Pohang Steelers

Senior career*
Years	Team	Apps	(Gls)
2021–2025	Pohang Steelers	35	(0)
2024–2025	→ Gimcheon Sangmu FC (army)	3	(0)
2026–	Gyeongnam FC	5	(0)
- * Club domestic league appearances and goals as of 6 August 2026

- Kim Jun-ho
- Hangul: 김준호
- RR: Gim Junho
- MR: Kim Chunho

Kim Jun-ho (Korean: 김준호; born 11 December 2002) is a South Korean footballer currently playing as a midfielder for Gyeongnam FC.

== Career statistics ==
=== Club ===
As of 30 November 2021.

Club	Season	League			Cup		Continental		Other		Total	
Club	Season	Division	Apps	Goals	Apps	Goals	Apps	Goals	Apps	Goals	Apps	Goals
Pohang Steelers	2021	K League 1	1	0	0	0	0	0	0	0	1	0
Career total			1	0	0	0	0	0	0	0	1	0
