= Park Chan-yong (footballer) =

South Korean footballer

Park Chan-yong 朴璨鎔
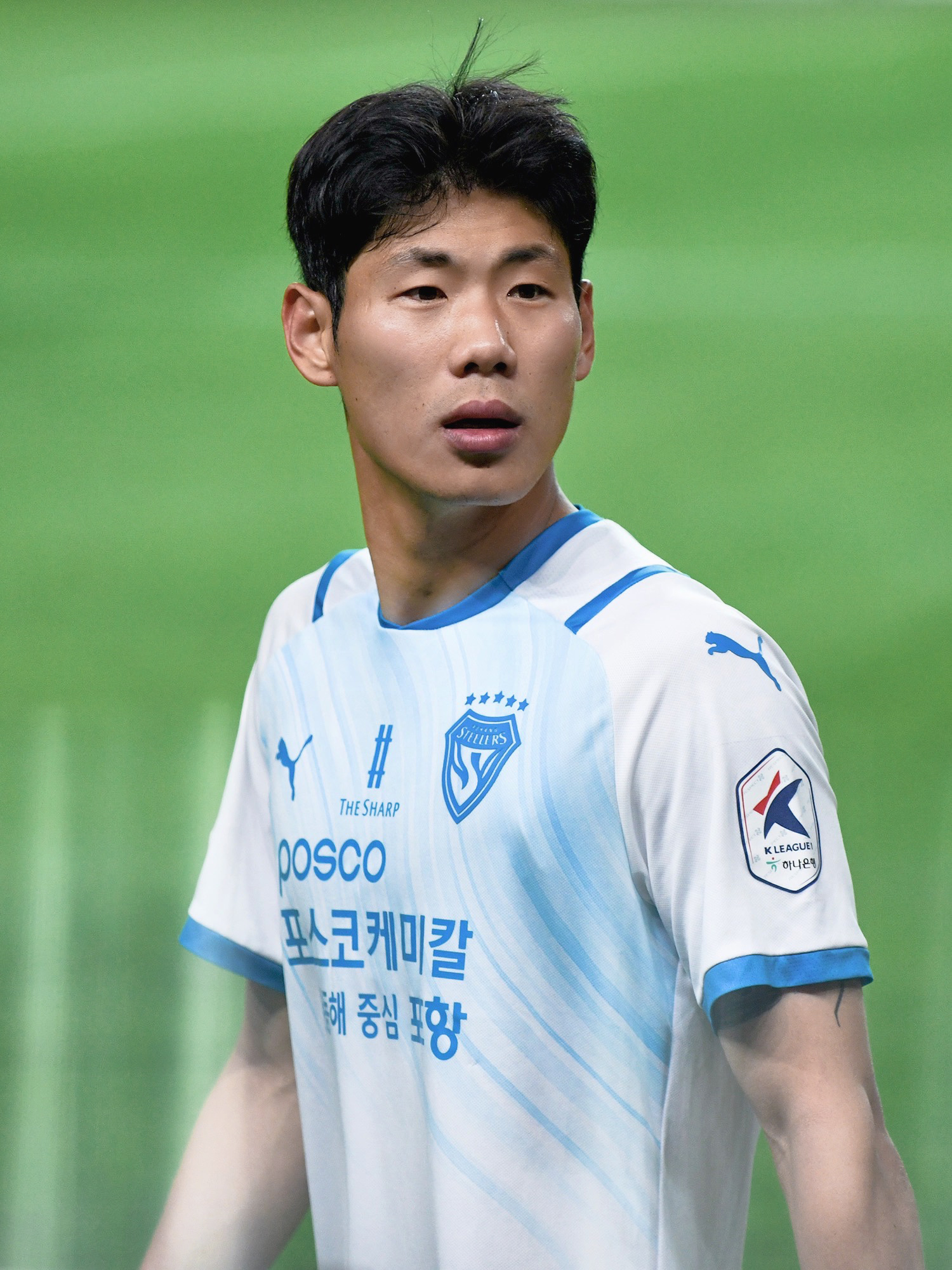
- Park with Pohang Steelers in May 2022

Personal information
- Full name: Park Chan-yong
- Date of birth: January 27, 1996 (age 30)
- Place of birth: South Korea
- Height: 1.88 m (6 ft 2 in)
- Position: Defender

Team information
- Current team: Pohang Steelers
- Number: 20

Senior career*
Years	Team	Apps	(Gls)
2015–2016	Ehime FC	8	(0)
2017	Renofa Yamaguchi	18	(1)
2018	Kamatamare Sanuki	21	(0)
2019	Gyeongju KHNP	26	(0)
2020–2021	Jeonnam Dragons	57	(2)
2022–	Pohang Steelers	86	(1)
2024–2025	→ Gimcheon Sangmu FC (army)	43	(0)
- * Club domestic league appearances and goals as of 3 August 2026

Park Chan-yong (Korean: 박찬용; born January 27, 1996) is a South Korean football player. He plays for Pohang Steelers.

== Club statistics ==
Updated to 23 February 2018.

Club performance			League		Cup		Total	
Season	Club	League	Apps	Goals	Apps	Goals	Apps	Goals
Japan			League		Emperor's Cup		Total	
2015	Ehime FC	J2 League	8	0	2	1	10	1
2016	Ehime FC	J2 League	0	0	1	0	1	0
2017	Renofa Yamaguchi	J2 League	18	1	1	0	19	1
Total			26	1	4	1	30	2
