= Jeon Min-gwang =

South Korean footballer (born 1993)

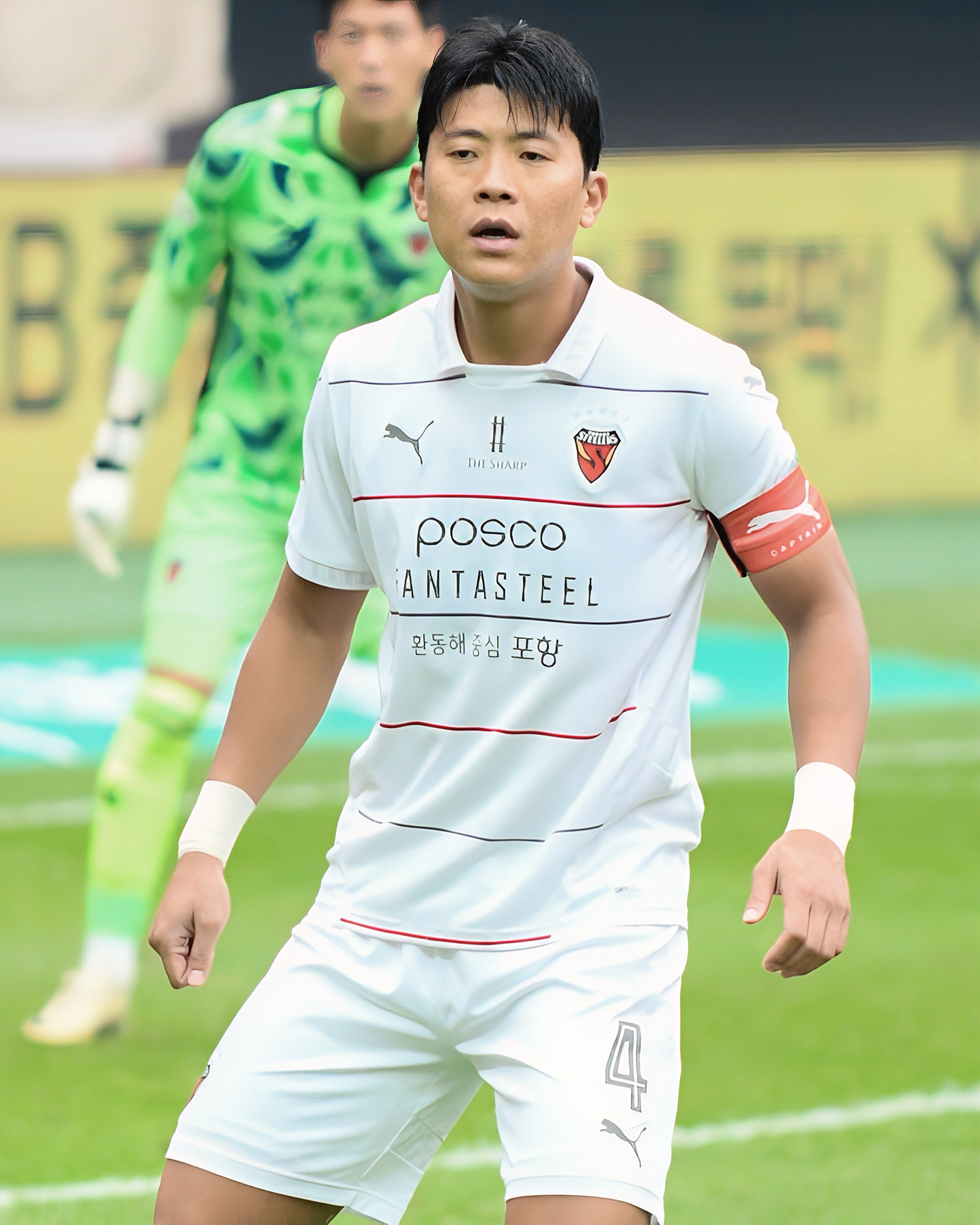

Personal information
- Full name: Jeon Min-gwang
- Date of birth: 17 January 1993 (age 33)
- Place of birth: South Korea
- Height: 1.86 m (6 ft 1 in)
- Position: Midfielder

Team information
- Current team: Pohang Steelers
- Number: 4

Youth career
- 2011–2014: Jungwon University

Senior career*
Years	Team	Apps	(Gls)
2015–2018	Seoul E-Land	104	(3)
2019–	Pohang Steelers	147	(2)
2022–2023	→ Goyang KH FC (loan)	39	(3)
- * Club domestic league appearances and goals as of 3 August 2026

Jeon Min-gwang (Korean: 전민광; Hanja: 全珉洸; born 17 January 1993) is a South Korean footballer who plays as midfielder for Pohang Steelers.

== Career ==
Jeon Min-gwang was selected by Seoul E-Land in 2015 K League draft.

For the 2019 season, he moved to Pohang Steelers.

In 2022, as a social service agent, he was loaned to a newly founded K4 League club, Goyang KH FC. At the beginning match of the season, he scored the first goal of the club against Geoje Citizen FC.
