= Pohang Steel Yard =

Football stadium in Pohang, South Korea

Pohang Steel Yard 포항스틸야드
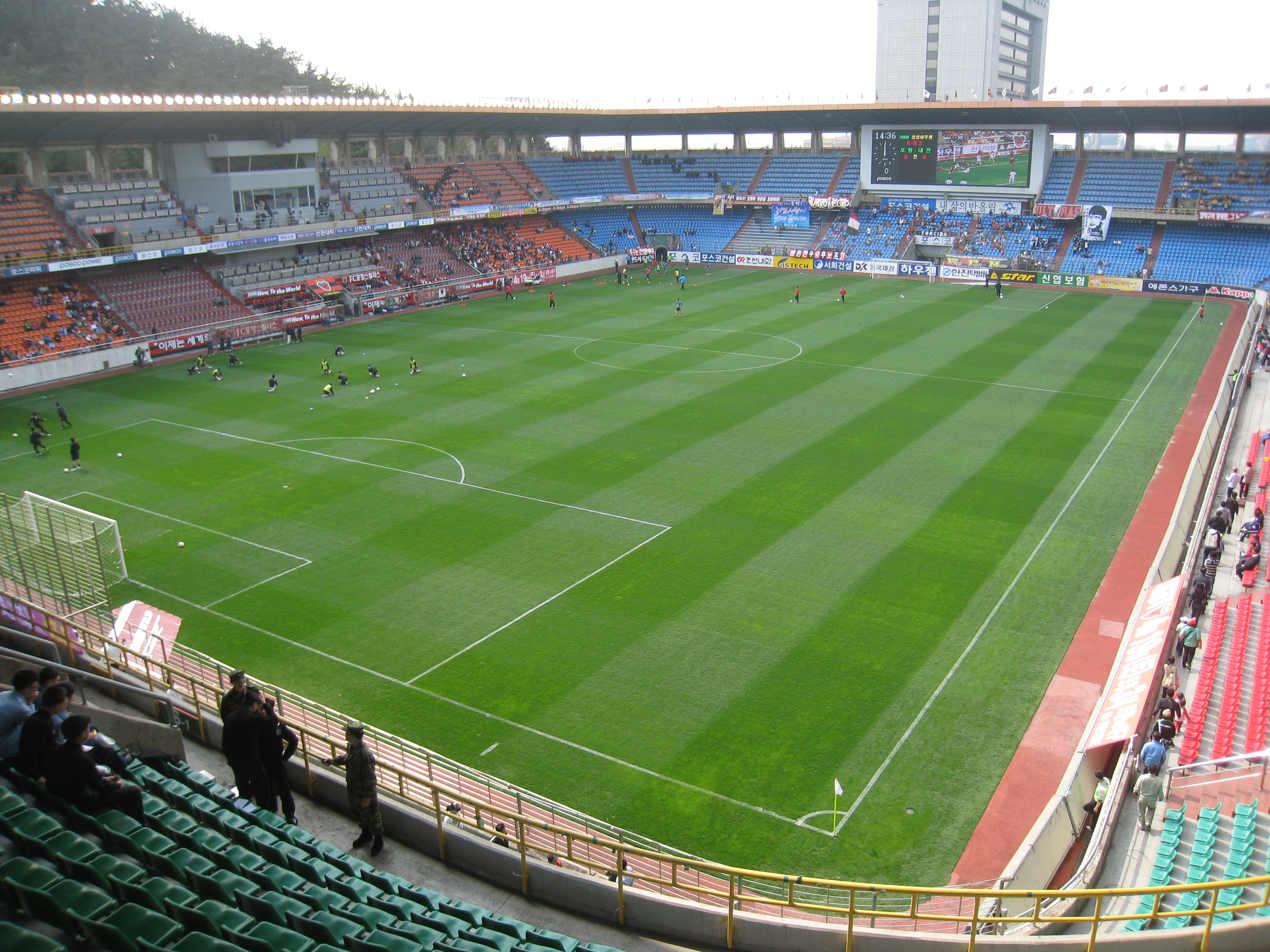
- Interactive map of Pohang Steel Yard 포항스틸야드
- Location: Jeomchonsa-dong 1-6, Nam-gu, Pohang, Gyeongsangbuk-do, South Korea
- Coordinates: 35.997781°N 129.384242°E
- Owner: POSCO
- Operator: Pohang Steelers
- Capacity: 15,546
- Surface: Natural grass
- Field size: 105 by 68 metres (115 by 74 yards)

Construction
- Opened: November 10, 1990
- Cost: 11 billion won

Tenant
- Pohang Steelers (1990–present)

The Pohang Steel Yard is a football stadium in Pohang, South Korea. It is the home stadium of Pohang Steelers. The stadium holds 15,546 spectators and was built in 1990 as the first football-specific stadium in South Korea.

== History ==
Former honorary POSCO chairman Park Tae-joon pushed for the construction of a football-specific stadium as a step towards the professionalisation of the POSCO team and the development of football in South Korea more broadly. Construction was completed in 1990 and the Steel Yard opened to the public in November of that year with a match between POSCO Atoms (now Pohang Steelers) and Korea University.

Pohang Steelers marked the 30th anniversary of the Steel Yard in 2020 by incorporating the stadium into the design of their home kit and releasing commemorative merchandise.

In 2022, the stadium was damaged by Typhoon Hinnamnor, forcing the Steelers to play a K League 1 home fixture against Suwon Samsung Bluewings at the Bluewings' own home ground.

== Structure and facilities ==
In 2003, the stadium was upgraded with a comprehensive renovation, such as a year-round turf field, modern sound system, and new player lockers. The electric scoreboard and lightings, sound facilities and convenient facilities are rated as good as those of the stadiums built to host the 2002 FIFA World Cup.

The VIP seating area, known as the Skybox, was refurbished in 2024 and seats up to 13 people. Ahead of the 2025 season, Pohang Steelers revealed a series of renovations to the stadium including the expansion of the supporters area in the north stand and the addition of seating with tables in some parts of the home end. Several convenience stores and fast food outlets were also opened within the stadium.

== Transport ==
The Steel Yard is located in the industrial area to the south of Pohang, 12 kilometres (7.5 mi) away from Pohang station. The stadium is served by local buses and there is free on-site parking for spectators.

== See also ==
- List of football stadiums in South Korea
