= Lee Ho-jae (footballer) =

South Korean footballer (born 2000)

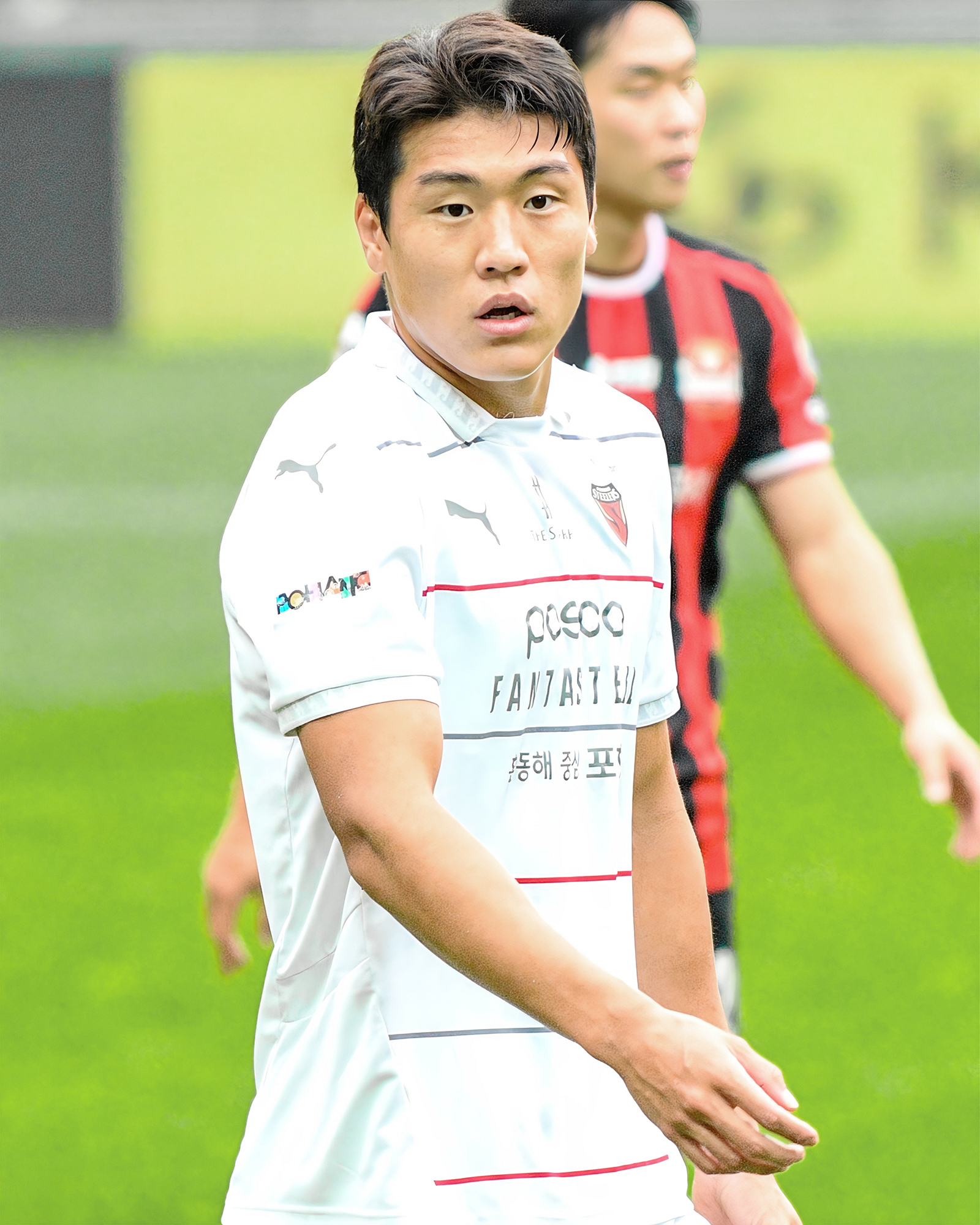
- Lee in 2025

Personal information
- Date of birth: 14 October 2000 (age 26)
- Place of birth: Suwon, Gyeonggi, South Korea
- Height: 1.92 m (6 ft 4 in)
- Position: Striker

Team information
- Current team: Darmstadt 98
- Number: 9

Youth career
- –2015: Onehunga Sports
- 2016–2018: Incheon United
- 2018–2020: Korea University

Senior career*
Years	Team	Apps	(Gls)
2021–2026	Pohang Steelers	149	(43)
2026–	Darmstadt 98	9	(2)

International career^{‡}
2025–	South Korea	3	(1)
- * Club domestic league appearances and goals as of 28 October 2026 ‡ National team caps and goals as of 15 July 2025

- Lee Ho-jae
- Hangul: 이호재
- RR: I Hojae
- MR: I Hojae

Lee Ho-jae (Korean: 이호재; born 14 October 2000) is a South Korean professional footballer, who plays as a center-forward for German 2. Bundesliga club Darmstadt 98 and the South Korea national team.

== Club career ==
After completing his youth development between New Zealand, with NRFL Premier club Onehunga Sports, and South Korea, where he played for Incheon United while his father Lee Ki-hyung was coaching the first team, Lee entered Korea University and eventually graduated in 2020.

At the start of 2021, Lee officially started his professional football career by joining K League 1 side Pohang Steelers. He subsequently made his professional debut on 28 February 2021, when he came in as a substitute for the injured Alex Grant in the 83rd minute of the 2-1 win against Incheon United.

On 28 June of the same year, he also made his debut in the AFC Champions League, as he replaced Goh Young-jun in the 88th minute of the group stage match against Malaysian side Johor Darul Ta'Zim, which ended up in a 4–1 win for Pohang.

On 3 October 2021, after coming in as a substitute for Lee Seung-mo in the 76th minute of a league match against Gwangju FC, he scored his first and second professional goals (respectively, in the 83rd and 90th minutes), which proved to be crucial as his team ultimately gained a 3–2 come-back victory.

== International career ==
Lee joined the South Korean under-23 national team for the first time in September 2021, when he was invited by manager Hwang Sun-hong to take part in a training camp in Paju.

== Personal life ==
He is the son of former professional footballer and manager Lee Ki-hyung, who represented South Korea at full international level. He moved to New Zealand in 2007 when his father signed for Auckland City.

== Career statistics ==
As of 28 October 2026

Appearances and goals by club, season and competition
Club	Season	League			Cup		Continental		Total	
Club	Season	Division	Apps	Goals	Apps	Goals	Apps	Goals	Apps	Goals
Pohang Steelers	2021	K League 1	15	2	0	0	5 (Note: Appearances in AFC Champions League Elite)	0	20	2
Pohang Steelers	2022	K League 1	16	1	1	2	—		17	3
Pohang Steelers	2023	K League 1	37	8	4	2	6	2	47	12
Pohang Steelers	2024	K League 1	27	9	2	1	2	0	31	10
Pohang Steelers	2025	K League 1	34	15	1	0	5 (Note: Two appearances and one goal in AFC Champions League Elite, three appearances and two goals in AFC Champions League Two)	3	40	18
Pohang Steelers	2026	K League 1	20	8	0	0	2 (Note: Appearances in AFC Champions League Two)	0	22	8
Pohang Steelers	Total		149	43	8	5	20	5	177	53
Darmstadt 98	2026–27	2. Bundesliga	9	2	2	0	0	0	11	2
Career total			158	45	10	5	20	5	188	55

=== International ===
Scores and results list South Korea's goal tally first.

List of international goals scored by Lee Ho-jae
No.	Date	Venue	Opponent	Score	Result	Competition
1	11 July 2025	Yongin Mireu Stadium, Yongin, South Korea	Hong Kong	2–0	2–0	2025 EAFF Championship
