= Eo Jeong-won =

Korean association football player

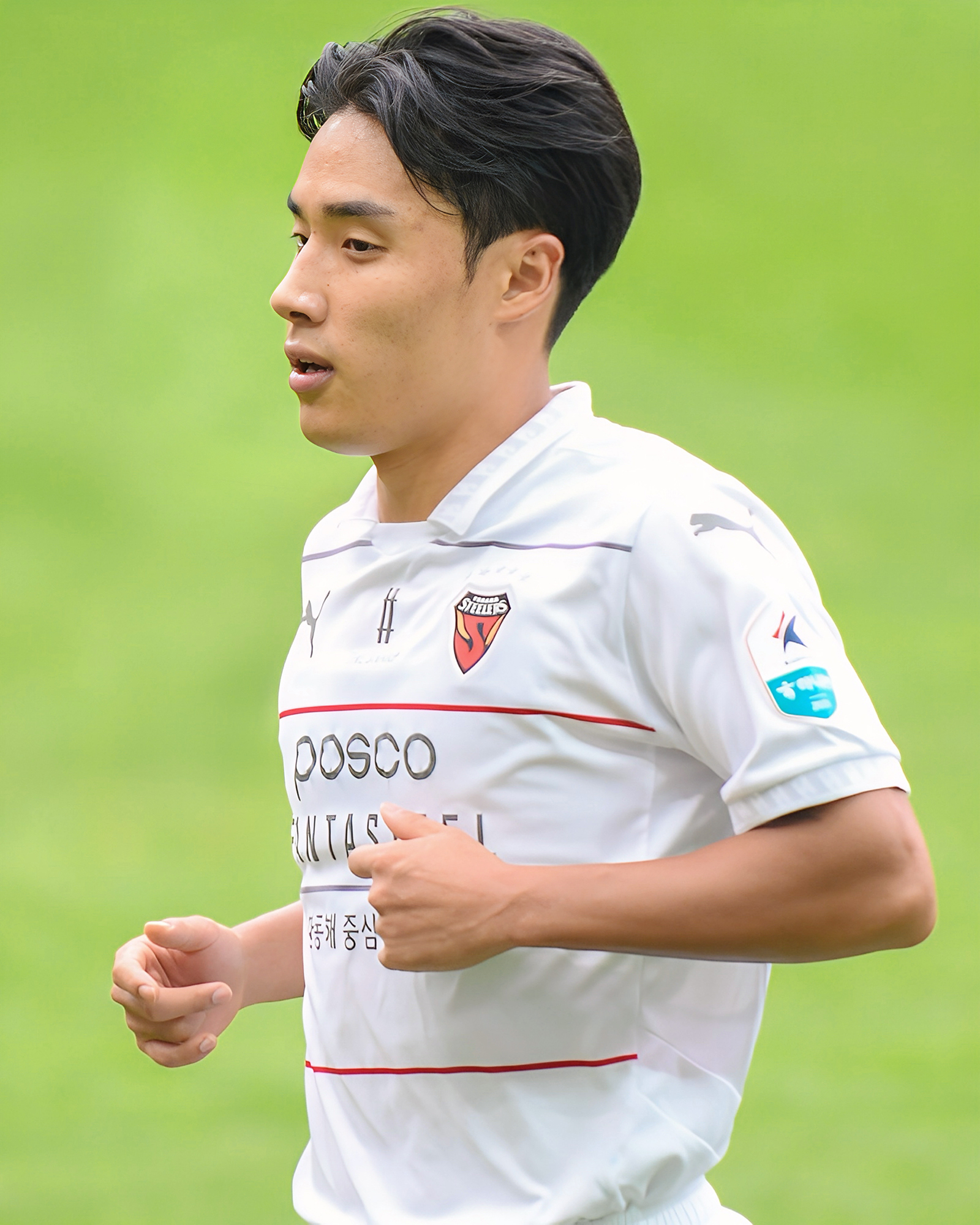
- Eo in 2025

Personal information
- Date of birth: 8 July 1999 (age 27)
- Place of birth: South Korea
- Height: 1.75 m (5 ft 9 in)
- Positions: Full back; winger

Team information
- Current team: Pohang Steelers
- Number: 2

Youth career
- 2015–2017: Gaesung High School
- 2018–2020: Dongguk University

Senior career*
Years	Team	Apps	(Gls)
2021–2023	Busan IPark	52	(0)
2022	→ Gimpo FC (loan)	8	(0)
2024–	Pohang Steelers	82	(2)
- * Club domestic league appearances and goals as of 3 August 2026

Eo Jeong-won (Korean: 어정원; born 8 July 1999) is a South Korean footballer currently playing as a full back for Pohang Steelers.

== Club career ==
Eo Jeong-won began his career as a right winger under Portuguese manager Ricardo Peres. After only appearing sporadically during his debut season, Eo was loaned out to Gimpo FC at the start of the 2022 season and played at left wing-back. When Busan IPark appointed coach Park Jin-sub to replace Peres in the summer of 2022, Park recalled Eo Jeong-won from his loan spell and made him a regular at left back. In 2023, Eo was shortlisted for the K League 2 Best XI for the season.

== Career statistics ==
=== Club ===
As of match played 11 December 2025.

Appearances and goals by club, season and competition
Club	Season	League			Cup		Continental		Play-offs		Total	
Club	Season	Division	Apps	Goals	Apps	Goals	Apps	Goals	Apps	Goals	Apps	Goals
Busan IPark	2021	K League 2	6	0	2	0	—		—		8	0
Busan IPark	2022	K League 2	17	0	—		—		—		17	0
Busan IPark	2023	K League 2	29	0	1	0	—		2	0	32	0
Busan IPark	Total		52	0	3	0	—		2	0	57	0
Gimpo FC (loan)	2022	K League 2	8	0	1	0	—		—		9	0
Pohang Steelers	2024	K League 1	28	1	5	1	8	0	—		41	2
Pohang Steelers	2025	K League 1	34	1	1	1	4	0	—		39	2
Pohang Steelers	Total		62	2	6	2	12	0	—		80	4
Career total			122	2	10	2	12	0	2	0	146	4
