= Gwangju Football Stadium =

Association football stadium in Gwangju, South Korea

- Interactive map of Gwangju Football Stadium
- Location: Gwangju, South Korea
- Coordinates: 35°07′51″N 126°52′30″E
- Owner: Gwangju Metropolitan City Hall
- Operator: Gwangju Metropolitan City Sports Association
- Capacity: 10,007
- Surface: Natural grass
- Field size: 97 by 68 metres (106 by 74 yards)

Construction
- Groundbreaking: January 2018
- Opened: 30 June 2020

Tenant
- Gwangju FC (2020–2024)

The Gwangju Football Stadium is a football-specific stadium in Gwangju, South Korea. It was the home ground of Gwangju FC between 2020 and 2024.

The stadium holds 10,007 spectators.

== History ==
Originally, it was the auxiliary stadium of the Gwangju World Cup Stadium, which was Gwangju FC's home venue before the 2020 and after the 2024 seasons. It was remodeled in 2018 and opened on 25 July 2020 in a K League 1 match between Gwangju FC and Suwon Samsung Bluewings.
