= 2008 Korea National League Championship =

Tournament details
- Country: South Korea
- City: Yanggu, Gangwon
- Dates: 9–18 July 2008
- Teams: 16

Final positions
- Champions: Daejeon KHNP (1st title)
- Runner-up: Ansan Hallelujah

Tournament statistics
- Top goal scorer(s): Hwang Seong-ju (6 goals)

Awards
- Best player: Kang Seong-il
- Best goalkeeper: Kang Seong-il

The 2008 Korea National League Championship was the fifth competition of the Korea National League Championship. Amateur clubs Gumi Siltron and Icheon Hyundai Autonet were invited to the competition.

== Group stage ==
=== Group A ===
| Pos | Team | Pld | W | D | L | GF | GA | GD | Pts |
|---|---|---|---|---|---|---|---|---|---|
| 1 | Daejeon KHNP | 3 | 2 | 1 | 0 | 7 | 3 | +4 | 7 |
| 2 | Incheon Korail | 3 | 1 | 1 | 1 | 7 | 7 | 0 | 4 |
| 3 | Busan Transportation Corporation | 3 | 1 | 0 | 2 | 4 | 5 | −1 | 3 |
| 4 | Suwon City | 3 | 1 | 0 | 2 | 5 | 8 | −3 | 3 |

Source: Report
7 July 2008
14:00 UTC+9

| Suwon City | 5–4 | Incheon Korail |

Yanggu Sports Complex A, Yanggu

7 July 2008
14:00 UTC+9

| Busan Transportation Corporation | 2–3 | Daejeon KHNP |

Yanggu Sports Complex B, Yanggu

9 July 2008
16:00 UTC+9

| Suwon City | 0–1 | Busan Transportation Corporation |

Yanggu Sports Complex B, Yanggu

9 July 2008
16:00 UTC+9

| Incheon Korail | 1–1 | Daejeon KHNP |

Yanggu Sports Complex A, Yanggu

11 July 2008
16:00 UTC+9

| Daejeon KHNP | 3–0 | Suwon City |

Yanggu Sports Complex B, Yanggu

11 July 2008
16:00 UTC+9

| Busan Transportation Corporation | 1–2 | Incheon Korail |

Yanggu Sports Complex A, Yanggu

=== Group B ===
| Pos | Team | Pld | W | D | L | GF | GA | GD | Pts |
|---|---|---|---|---|---|---|---|---|---|
| 1 | Gangneung City | 3 | 1 | 2 | 0 | 6 | 4 | +2 | 5 |
| 2 | Changwon City | 3 | 1 | 2 | 0 | 5 | 4 | +1 | 5 |
| 3 | Hyundai Mipo Dockyard | 3 | 1 | 1 | 1 | 5 | 4 | +1 | 4 |
| 4 | Nowon Hummel Korea | 3 | 0 | 1 | 2 | 3 | 7 | −4 | 1 |

Source: Report
7 July 2008
16:00 UTC+9

| Gangneung City | 2–2 | Hyundai Mipo Dockyard |

Yanggu Sports Complex A, Yanggu

7 July 2008
16:00 UTC+9

| Nowon Hummel Korea | 2–2 | Changwon City |

Yanggu Sports Complex B, Yanggu

9 July 2008
14:00 UTC+9

| Gangneung City | 2–0 | Nowon Hummel Korea |

Yanggu Sports Complex B, Yanggu

9 July 2008
14:00 UTC+9

| Hyundai Mipo Dockyard | 0–1 | Changwon City FC |

Yanggu Sports Complex A, Yanggu

11 July 2008
14:00 UTC+9

| Changwon City | 2–2 | Gangneung City |

Yanggu Sports Complex B, Yanggu

11 July 2008
14:00 UTC+9

| Nowon Hummel Korea | 1–3 | Hyundai Mipo Dockyard |

Yanggu Sports Complex A, Yanggu

=== Group C ===
| Pos | Team | Pld | W | D | L | GF | GA | GD | Pts |
|---|---|---|---|---|---|---|---|---|---|
| 1 | Gimhae City | 3 | 2 | 1 | 0 | 15 | 4 | +11 | 7 |
| 2 | Goyang Kookmin Bank | 3 | 2 | 1 | 0 | 10 | 3 | +7 | 7 |
| 3 | Yesan FC | 3 | 1 | 0 | 2 | 4 | 8 | −4 | 3 |
| 4 | Icheon Hyundai Autonet | 3 | 0 | 0 | 3 | 2 | 16 | −14 | 0 |

Source: Report
8 July 2008
14:00 UTC+9

| Goyang Kookmin Bank | 2–1 | Yesan FC |

Yanggu Sports Complex A, Yanggu

8 July 2008
14:00 UTC+9

| Gimhae City | 8–1 | Icheon Hyundai Autonet |

Yanggu Sports Complex B, Yanggu

10 July 2008
16:00 UTC+9

| Goyang Kookmin Bank | 2–2 | Gimhae City |

Yanggu Sports Complex B, Yanggu

10 July 2008
16:00 UTC+9

| Yesan FC | 2–1 | Icheon Hyundai Autonet |

Yanggu Sports Complex A, Yanggu

12 July 2008
14:00 UTC+9

| Icheon Hyundai Autonet | 0–6 | Goyang Kookmin Bank |

Yanggu Sports Complex B, Yanggu

12 July 2008
14:00 UTC+9

| Gimhae City | 5–1 | Yesan FC |

Yanggu Sports Complex A, Yanggu

=== Group D ===
| Pos | Team | Pld | W | D | L | GF | GA | GD | Pts |
|---|---|---|---|---|---|---|---|---|---|
| 1 | Ansan Hallelujah | 3 | 2 | 1 | 0 | 5 | 0 | +5 | 7 |
| 2 | Hongcheon Idu | 3 | 1 | 2 | 0 | 4 | 3 | +1 | 5 |
| 3 | Cheonan City | 3 | 1 | 1 | 1 | 3 | 5 | −2 | 4 |
| 4 | Gumi Siltron | 3 | 0 | 0 | 3 | 3 | 7 | −4 | 0 |

Source: Report
8 July 2008
16:00 UTC+9

| Cheonan City | 0–3 | Ansan Hallelujah |

Yanggu Sports Complex A, Yanggu

8 July 2008
16:00 UTC+9

| Hongcheon Idu | 3–2 | Gumi Siltron |

Yanggu Sports Complex B, Yanggu

10 July 2008
14:00 UTC+9

| Cheonan City | 1–1 | Hongcheon Idu |

Yanggu Sports Complex B, Yanggu

10 July 2008
14:00 UTC+9

| Ansan Hallelujah | 2–0 | Gumi Siltron |

Yanggu Sports Complex A, Yanggu

12 July 2008
14:00 UTC+9

| Gumi Siltron | 1–2 | Cheonan City |

Yanggu Sports Complex B, Yanggu

12 July 2008
14:00 UTC+9

| Hongcheon Idu | 0–0 | Ansan Hallelujah |

Yanggu Sports Complex A, Yanggu

== Knockout stage ==
=== Bracket ===
Quarter-finals
Daejeon KHNP (p) | 2 (4)
Goyang KB Kookmin Bank | 2 (2)
Gangneung City | 5
Hongcheon Idu | 2
Gimhae City | 1
Incheon Korail | 2
Ansan Hallelujah | 2
Changwon City | 1

Semi-finals
Daejeon KHNP | 2
Gangneung City | 1
Incheon Korail | 1
Ansan Hallelujah | 2

Final
Daejeon KHNP (p) | 3 (3)
Ansan Hallelujah | 3 (0)

=== Quarter-finals ===
14 July 2008
14:00 UTC+9

| Daejeon KHNP | 2–2 (a.e.t.) | Goyang Kookmin Bank |
|---|---|---|
| | Report |
Penalties
| | 4–2 |

Yanggu Sports Complex B, Yanggu
14 July 2008
14:00 UTC+9

| Gangneung City | 5–2 | Hongcheon Idu |
|---|---|---|
| | Report |

Yanggu Sports Complex A, Yanggu

14 July 2008
16:00 UTC+9

| Gimhae City | 1–2 | Incheon Korail |
|---|---|---|
| | Report |

Yanggu Sports Complex B, Yanggu

14 July 2008
16:00 UTC+9

| Ansan Hallelujah | 2–1 | Changwon City |
|---|---|---|
| | Report |

Yanggu Sports Complex A, Yanggu

=== Semi-finals ===
16 July 2008
14:00 UTC+9

| Daejeon KHNP | 2–1 | Gangneung City |
|---|---|---|
| | Report |

Yanggu Sports Complex A, Yanggu

16 July 2008
16:00 UTC+9

| Incheon Korail | 1–2 | Ansan Hallelujah |
|---|---|---|
| | Report |

Yanggu Sports Complex A, Yanggu

=== Final ===
18 July 2008
14:00 UTC+9

| Daejeon KHNP | 3–3 (a.e.t.) | Ansan Hallelujah |
|---|---|---|
| | Report |
Penalties
| | 3–0 |

Yanggu Sports Complex A, Yanggu

== See also ==
- 2008 in South Korean football
- 2008 Korea National League
