= 2015 Korea National League =

Incheon International Airport Korea National League
- Season: 2015
- Dates: 14 March – 4 November 2015
- Champions: Hyundai Mipo Dockyard (6th title)
- Matches: 90
- Goals: 314 (3.49 per match)
- Best Player: Koo Sang-min
- Top goalscorer: Han Gun-yong (13 goals)

The 2015 Korea National League, also known as Incheon International Airport National League 2015 due to the sponsorship of Incheon International Airport, was the 13th season of the Korea National League, the third tier of South Korea's football league system. Each of the ten clubs played three games against every other club in the regular season, and the top four clubs of the regular season qualified for post-season playoffs.

== Teams ==
Locations of the 2015 Korea National League clubs

Team	Location	Stadium
Busan Transportation Corporation	Busan	Busan Gudeok Stadium
Changwon City	Changwon	Changwon Football Center
Cheonan City	Cheonan	Cheonan Stadium
Daejeon Korail	Daejeon	Daejeon Hanbat Stadium
Gangneung City	Gangneung	Gangneung Stadium
Gimhae City	Gimhae	Gimhae Stadium
Gyeongju KHNP	Gyeongju	Gyeongju Civic Stadium
Hyundai Mipo Dockyard	Ulsan	Ulsan Stadium
Mokpo City	Mokpo	Mokpo International Football Center
Yongin City	Yongin	Yongin Football Center

== Regular season ==
=== League table ===
Pos	Team	Pld	W	D	L	GF	GA	GD	Pts	Qualification or relegation
1	Hyundai Mipo Dockyard	27	13	11	3	47	24	+23	50	Qualification for the playoffs final
2	Changwon City	27	13	7	7	37	33	+4	46	Qualification for the playoffs semi-final
3	Gyeongju KHNP	27	12	9	6	39	27	+12	45	Qualification for the playoffs first round
4	Mokpo City	27	12	8	7	30	21	+9	44	Qualification for the playoffs first round
5	Daejeon Korail	27	8	9	10	36	27	+9	33	
6	Yongin City	27	8	9	10	25	29	−4	33	
7	Gimhae City	27	6	11	10	29	39	−10	29	
8	Cheonan City	27	6	10	11	27	39	−12	28	
9	Gangneung City	27	5	12	10	20	29	−9	27	
10	Busan Transportation Corporation	27	5	8	14	24	46	−22	23	

Source: Korea National League
Rules for classification: 1) Points; 2) Goal difference; 3) Goals scored.

=== Positions by matchday ===
Team ╲ Round	1	2	3	4	5	6	7	8	9	10	11	12	13	14	15	16	17	18	19	20	21	22	23	24	25	26	27
Hyundai Mipo Dockyard	5	7	3	4	5	4	3	4	4	3	2	2	2	3	3	3	3	3	3	3	3	3	3	1	1	1	1
Changwon City	1	1	2	3	2	5	5	5	3	2	3	4	3	2	2	2	2	2	2	2	2	2	1	2	2	4	2
Gyeongju KHNP	1	1	1	1	1	1	1	1	1	1	1	1	1	1	1	1	1	1	1	1	1	1	2	3	4	2	3
Mokpo City	7	3	4	2	3	3	4	3	5	5	5	3	4	4	5	4	4	4	4	4	4	4	4	4	3	3	4
Daejeon Korail	7	9	5	5	4	2	2	2	2	4	4	6	7	5	4	5	5	5	5	5	6	6	6	7	6	6	5
Yongin City	1	4	7	6	7	6	6	6	6	6	6	5	5	6	7	6	6	6	6	6	5	5	5	5	5	5	6
Gimhae City	5	8	9	8	9	10	10	10	10	10	10	10	10	10	10	10	10	10	10	10	10	10	10	10	9	9	7
Cheonan City	7	4	8	9	10	9	9	9	9	9	9	9	9	9	9	9	9	9	9	8	8	9	8	6	8	7	8
Gangneung City	1	6	6	7	8	8	7	7	7	7	7	8	8	8	8	8	8	8	8	9	9	8	7	8	7	8	9
Busan Transportation Corporation	7	10	10	10	6	7	8	8	8	8	8	7	6	7	6	7	7	7	7	7	7	7	9	9	10	10	10

Source: Korea National League
= Leaders; = Qualification for the playoffs

=== Results ===
==== Matches 1–18 ====
Home \ Away	BTC	CWC	CAC	DJK	GNC	GHC	GHN	HMD	MPC	YIC
Busan Transportation Corporation	—	3–1	0–1	1–1	1–1	0–0	0–4	1–4	1–2	0–1
Changwon City	2–1	—	4–1	1–1	0–0	1–3	1–0	0–1	1–0	2–1
Cheonan City	1–2	0–1	—	0–1	2–2	2–1	1–0	1–1	0–1	0–0
Daejeon Korail	4–0	1–1	4–0	—	2–0	2–0	0–1	1–1	1–1	1–2
Gangneung City	0–0	2–1	1–0	3–2	—	1–1	1–1	1–0	1–2	0–0
Gimhae City	3–3	1–1	0–1	0–4	1–0	—	1–2	0–0	2–2	2–0
Gyeongju KHNP	1–1	4–1	1–1	2–1	1–0	1–3	—	1–1	0–3	0–0
Hyundai Mipo Dockyard	3–1	5–2	6–3	2–1	2–0	1–1	0–0	—	2–2	1–0
Mokpo City	1–2	0–0	1–0	2–1	2–0	1–3	0–1	0–1	—	0–1
Yongin City	2–1	2–3	1–1	0–1	1–0	4–1	1–2	1–1	0–0	—

Source: Korea National League (in Korean)
Legend: Blue = home team win; Yellow = draw; Red = away team win.

==== Matches 19–27 ====
Home \ Away	BTC	CWC	CAC	DJK	GNC	GHC	GHN	HMD	MPC	YIC
Busan Transportation Corporation	—	—	—	0–0	—	2–0	—	—	1–2	0–0
Changwon City	3–0	—	2–1	2–1	0–0	—	—	2–0	1–0	—
Cheonan City	2–0	—	—	2–2	—	1–1	—	—	—	2–1
Daejeon Korail	—	—	—	—	1–0	—	—	1–1	0–0	1–2
Gangneung City	0–1	—	1–1	—	—	2–2	—	0–2	—	2–2
Gimhae City	—	0–0	—	2–1	—	—	1–1	—	0–1	—
Gyeongju KHNP	3–2	5–1	3–1	1–0	1–2	—	—	—	—	—
Hyundai Mipo Dockyard	4–0	—	1–1	—	—	4–0	1–1	—	1–3	—
Mokpo City	—	—	1–1	—	0–0	—	1–0	—	—	2–0
Yongin City	—	0–3	—	—	—	1–0	2–2	0–1	—	—

Source: Korea National League (in Korean)
Legend: Blue = home team win; Yellow = draw; Red = away team win.

== Championship playoffs ==
=== Bracket ===
First round
3	Gyeongju KHNP	2
4	Mokpo City	0

Semi-final
2	Changwon City	0 (5)
1R	Gyeongju KHNP (p)	0 (6)

Final
SF	Gyeongju KHNP	0	0	0
1	Hyundai Mipo Dockyard	1	1	2

=== First round ===
4 November 2015
15:00

Gyeongju KHNP	2–0	Mokpo City
Yu Man-gi 25'; Kim Bon-kwang 45'	Report

Gyeongju Civic Stadium, Gyeongju
Attendance: 300
Referee: Choi Gwang-ho

=== Semi-final ===
7 November 2015
15:00

Changwon City	0–0 (a.e.t.)	Gyeongju KHNP
	Report
Penalties
	5–6

Changwon Football Center, Changwon
Attendance: 400
Referee: Park Mal-bong

=== Final ===
11 November 2015
15:00

Gyeongju KHNP	0–1	Hyundai Mipo Dockyard
		Cho Woo-jin 34'

Gyeongju Civic Stadium, Gyeongju
Attendance: 400
Referee: Hong Chang-ki

14 November 2015
15:00

Hyundai Mipo Dockyard	1–0	Gyeongju KHNP
Cho Woo-jin 85'

Ulsan Stadium, Ulsan
Attendance: 1,700
Referee: Kim Deok-chul

Hyundai Mipo Dockyard won 2–0 on aggregate.

== See also ==
- 2015 in South Korean football
- 2015 Korea National League Championship
- 2015 Korean FA Cup
