= 2014 Korea National League Championship =

2014 Hana Bank National League Championship

Tournament details
- Country: South Korea
- City: Yanggu, Gangwon
- Dates: 30 May – 12 June 2014
- Teams: 10

Final positions
- Champions: Gyeongju KHNP (2nd title)
- Runner-up: Gangneung City

Tournament statistics
- Matches played: 23
- Top goal scorer(s): Park Jeong-min (4 goals)

Awards
- Best player: Jo Ju-young
- Best goalkeeper: Kim Tae-hong

The 2014 Korea National League Championship, known as the 2014 Hana Bank National League Championship, was the eleventh competition of the Korea National League Championship.

== Group stage ==
=== Group A ===
Team	Pld	W	D	L	GF	GA	GD	Pts
Gyeongju KHNP	4	1	3	0	5	4	+1	6
Hyundai Mipo Dockyard	4	1	3	0	1	0	+1	6
Gimhae City	4	0	4	0	2	2	0	4
Busan Transportation Corporation	4	0	4	0	2	2	0	4
Cheonan City	4	0	2	2	4	6	–2	2

30 May 2014
14:00

Gimhae City	2–2	Gyeongju KHNP
	Report

Yanggu Sports Complex, Yanggu

30 May 2014
16:00

Cheonan City	2–2	Busan Transportation Corporation
	Report

Yanggu Sports Complex, Yanggu

1 June 2014
14:00

Busan Transportation Corporation	0–0	Hyundai Mipo Dockyard
	Report

Yanggu Sports Complex B, Yanggu

1 June 2014
16:00

Cheonan City	0–0	Gimhae City
	Report

Yanggu Sports Complex B, Yanggu

3 June 2014
46:00

Gyeongju KHNP	3–2	Cheonan City
	Report

Yanggu Sports Complex B, Yanggu

3 June 2014
16:00

Hyundai Mipo Dockyard	0–0	Gimhae City
	Report

Yanggu Sports Complex B, Yanggu

5 June 2014
14:00

Gimhae City	0–0	Busan Transportation Corporation
	Report

Yanggu Sports Complex, Yanggu

5 June 2014
16:00

Hyundai Mipo Dockyard	0–0	Gyeongju KHNP
	Report

Yanggu Sports Complex, Yanggu

7 June 2014
14:00

Cheonan City	0–1	Hyundai Mipo Dockyard
	Report

Yanggu Sports Complex, Yanggu

7 June 2014
16:00

Busan Transportation Corporation	0–0	Gyeongju KHNP
	Report

Yanggu Sports Complex, Yanggu

=== Group B ===
Team	Pld	W	D	L	GF	GA	GD	Pts
Gangneung City	4	3	1	0	6	2	+4	10
Mokpo City	4	2	2	0	7	2	+5	8
Daejeon Korail	4	2	1	1	8	6	+2	7
Yongin City	4	1	0	3	5	10	–5	3
Changwon City	4	0	0	4	3	9	–6	0

31 May 2014
14:00

Mokpo City	1–1	Gangneung City
	Report

Yanggu Sports Complex B, Yanggu

31 May 2014
16:00

Daejeon Korail	3–2	Changwon City
	Report

Yanggu Sports Complex B, Yanggu

2 June 2014
16:00

Changwon City	1–2	Yongin City
	Report

Yanggu Sports Complex, Yanggu

2 June 2014
14:00

Daejeon Korail	0–0	Mokpo City
	Report

Yanggu Sports Complex, Yanggu

4 June 2014
46:00

Gangneung City	2–1	Daejeon Korail
	Report

Yanggu Sports Complex, Yanggu

4 June 2014
16:00

Yongin City	1–3	Mokpo City
	Report

Yanggu Sports Complex, Yanggu

6 June 2014
14:00

Mokpo City	3–0	Changwon City
	Report

Yanggu Sports Complex B, Yanggu

6 June 2014
16:00

Yongin City	0–2	Gangneung City
	Report

Yanggu Sports Complex B, Yanggu

8 June 2014
14:00

Daejeon Korail	4–2	Yongin City
	Report

Yanggu Sports Complex, Yanggu

8 June 2014
16:00

Changwon City	0–1	Gangneung City
	Report

Yanggu Sports Complex, Yanggu

== Knockout stage ==
=== Bracket ===
Semifinals
A1	Gyeongju KHNP	2
B2	Mokpo City	1
B1	Gangneung City	3
A2	Hyundai Mipo Dockyard	1

Final
Gyeongju KHNP	2
Gangneung City	1

=== Semi-finals ===
10 June 2014
14:00

Gyeongju KHNP	2–1	Mokpo City
	Report

Yanggu Sports Complex, Yanggu

10 June 2014
16:00

Gangneung City	3–1	Hyundai Mipo Dockyard
	Report

Yanggu Sports Complex, Yanggu

=== Final ===
13 June 2014
14:00

Gyeongju KHNP	2–1	Gangneung City
	Report

Yanggu Sports Complex, Yanggu

== See also ==
- 2014 in South Korean football
- 2014 Korea National League
