= 2006 Korea National League Championship =

Tournament details
- Country: South Korea
- City: Namhae, Gyeongnam
- Dates: 18–28 July 2006
- Teams: 13

Final positions
- Champions: Changwon City (1st title)
- Runner-up: Hyundai Mipo Dockyard

Tournament statistics
- Top goal scorer(s): Lee Kil-yong

Awards
- Best player: Jeon Hyeon-seok

The 2006 Korea National League Championship was the third competition of the Korea National League Championship. Gumi Siltron, Hwaseong Shinwoo Electronics and Yeosu FC were invited to the competition.

== Group stage ==
=== Group A ===
Pos	Team	Pld	W	D	L	GF	GA	GD	Pts	HMD	GKB	GPH
1	Hyundai Mipo Dockyard	2	1	1	0	5	4	+1	4	—	4–2	2–2
2	Goyang KB Kookmin Bank	2	1	0	1	5	3	+2	3		—	3–0
3	Gimpo Hallelujah	2	0	1	1	2	5	−3	1			—

Source: Report

=== Group B ===
Pos	Team	Pld	W	D	L	GF	GA	GD	Pts	BTC	ICK	SSC	GMS
1	Busan Transportation Corporation	3	2	1	0	6	2	+4	7	—	0–0	3–2	3–0
2	Incheon Korail	3	2	1	0	3	1	+2	7		—	1–0	2–1
3	Seosan Citizen	3	0	1	2	2	4	−2	1			—	0–0
4	Gumi Siltron	3	0	1	2	1	5	−4	1				—

Source: Report

=== Group C ===
Pos	Team	Pld	W	D	L	GF	GA	GD	Pts	CWC	SWC	HSE
1	Changwon City	2	1	0	1	4	4	0	3	—	4–2	0–2
2	Suwon City	2	1	0	1	4	4	0	3		—	2–0
3	Hwaseong Shinwoo Electronics	2	1	0	1	2	2	0	3			—

Source: Report

=== Group D ===
Pos	Team	Pld	W	D	L	GF	GA	GD	Pts	IHK	KHN	YEO
1	Icheon Hummel Korea	2	1	0	1	6	5	+1	3	—	1–3	5–2
2	Daejeon KHNP	2	1	0	1	6	6	0	3		—	3–5
3	Yeosu FC	2	1	0	1	7	8	−1	3			—

Source: Report

== Knockout stage ==
=== Bracket ===
Quarter-finals
Hyundai Mipo Dockyard (p)	2 (9)
Suwon City	2 (8)
Busan Transportation Corporation	3
Daejeon KHNP	1
Changwon City	3
Goyang KB Kookmin Bank	2
Icheon Hummel Korea	2
Incheon Korail	0

Semi-finals
Hyundai Mipo Dockyard	2
Busan Transportation Corporation	1
Changwon City	4
Icheon Hummel Korea	1

Final
Hyundai Mipo Dockyard	1
Changwon City	2

=== Semi-finals ===
26 July 2006

Hyundai Mipo Dockyard	2–1 (a.e.t.)	Busan Transportation Corporation
Kim Kyung-choon 19'; Jong Min-moo 120'	Report	Park Sang-sin 7'

Namhae Sports Park, Namhae

26 July 2006

Changwon City	4–1	Icheon Hummel Korea
	Report

Namhae Sports Park, Namhae

=== Final ===
28 July 2006

Hyundai Mipo Dockyard	1–2	Changwon City
Kim Young-hoo 66' (pen.)	Report	Lee Kil-yong 25', 85'

Namhae Sports Park, Namhae

== See also ==
- 2006 in South Korean football
- 2006 Korea National League
