= 2018 Korea National League =

Hanwha Life Korea National League
- Season: 2018
- Dates: 17 March – 10 November 2018
- Champions: Gyeongju KHNP (2nd title)
- Matches: 56
- Goals: 278 (4.96 per match)
- Best Player: Jang Baek-gyu
- Top goalscorer: Kim Sang-wook (11 goals)

The 2018 Korea National League was the 16th season of the Korea National League, the third tier of South Korea's football league system. Each of eight clubs played four times against all other clubs in the regular season, and the top three clubs from the regular season qualified for the post-season playoffs.

== Teams ==
Locations of the 2018 Korea National League clubs

Team	Location	Stadium
Busan Transportation Corporation	Busan	Busan Gudeok Stadium
Changwon City	Changwon	Changwon Football Center
Cheonan City	Cheonan	Cheonan Stadium
Daejeon Korail	Daejeon	Daejeon Hanbat Stadium
Gangneung City	Gangneung	Gangneung Stadium
Gimhae City	Gimhae	Gimhae Stadium
Gyeongju KHNP	Gyeongju	Gyeongju Civic Stadium
Mokpo City	Mokpo	Mokpo International Football Center

== Regular season ==
=== League table ===
Pos	Team	Pld	W	D	L	GF	GA	GD	Pts	Qualification
1	Gyeongju KHNP	28	18	7	3	46	25	+21	61	Qualification for the playoffs final
2	Gimhae City	28	16	8	4	46	20	+26	56	Qualification for the playoffs semi-final
3	Cheonan City	28	13	7	8	33	32	+1	46	Qualification for the playoffs semi-final
4	Gangneung City	28	10	7	11	35	30	+5	37	
5	Mokpo City	28	7	10	11	36	42	−6	31	
6	Changwon City	28	5	13	10	28	41	−13	28	
7	Daejeon Korail	28	7	6	15	31	40	−9	27	
8	Busan Transportation Corporation	28	2	10	16	21	46	−25	16	

Source: RSSSF
Rules for classification: 1) Points; 2) Goal difference; 3) Goals scored.

=== Positions by matchday ===
Team ╲ Round	1	2	3	4	5	6	7	8	9	10	11	12	13	14	15	16	17	18	19	20	21	22	23	24	25	26	27	28
Gyeongju KHNP	3	2	2	2	2	2	1	1	1	1	1	1	2	1	1	1	1	1	1	1	1	1	1	1	1	1	1	1
Gimhae City	1	1	1	1	1	1	2	2	2	2	2	2	1	2	2	2	2	2	2	2	2	2	2	2	2	2	2	2
Cheonan City	4	3	4	5	4	3	3	3	3	3	3	3	3	3	3	3	3	3	3	3	3	3	3	3	3	3	3	3
Gangneung City	6	7	8	8	8	8	8	8	7	6	6	6	6	6	6	6	6	5	6	6	6	6	6	5	4	4	4	4
Mokpo City	7	6	3	4	5	5	5	5	5	5	5	5	4	5	5	5	5	6	4	4	4	4	4	4	5	5	5	5
Changwon City	4	5	5	6	6	6	7	7	8	7	7	7	7	7	7	7	7	7	7	7	7	7	7	7	7	7	7	6
Daejeon Korail	1	4	6	3	3	4	4	4	4	4	4	4	5	4	4	4	4	4	5	5	5	5	5	6	6	6	6	7
Busan Transportation Corporation	7	8	7	7	7	7	6	6	6	8	8	8	8	8	8	8	8	8	8	8	8	8	8	8	8	8	8	8

Source: Korea National League JoinKFA
= Leaders; = Qualification for the playoffs

== Championship playoffs ==
Semi-final					Final
2	Gimhae City	3	3	6
3	Cheonan City	2	0	2
3	Cheonan City	2	0	2	SF	Gimhae City	1	0	1
					1	Gyeongju KHNP	2	2	4

== See also ==
- 2018 in South Korean football
- 2018 Korea National League Championship
- 2018 Korean FA Cup
