= 2017 Korea National League Championship =

Tournament details
- Country: South Korea
- Cities: Yanggu, Gangwon
- Dates: 3–16 June 2017
- Teams: 8

Final positions
- Champions: Changwon City (2nd title)
- Runners-up: Cheonan City

Tournament statistics
- Matches played: 15
- Top goal scorer: Jang Baek-gyu (4 goals)

Awards
- Best player: Choi Myeong-hee
- Best goalkeeper: Kim Ho-joon

The 2017 Korea National League Championship was the 14th competition of the Korea National League Championship, the third-highest division of South Korea's football league system.

== Group stage ==
=== Group A ===
| Team | Pld | W | D | L | GF | GA | GD | Pts |
|---|---|---|---|---|---|---|---|---|
| Cheonan City | 3 | 1 | 2 | 0 | 5 | 4 | +1 | 5 |
| Changwon City | 3 | 1 | 1 | 1 | 4 | 3 | +1 | 4 |
| Gimhae City | 3 | 1 | 1 | 1 | 3 | 3 | 0 | 4 |
| Mokpo City | 3 | 0 | 2 | 1 | 2 | 4 | –2 | 2 |

3 June 2017
14:00

| Changwon City | 0–1 | Gimhae City |
|---|---|---|
| | Report |

Yanggu Sports Complex, Yanggu

3 June 2017
16:00

| Mokpo City | 1–1 | Cheonan City |
|---|---|---|
| | Report |

Yanggu Sports Complex, Yanggu

6 June 2017
16:00

| Gimhae City | 1–1 | Mokpo City |
|---|---|---|
| | Report |

Yanggu Sports Complex, Yanggu

6 June 2017
16:00

| Changwon City | 2–2 | Cheonan City |
|---|---|---|
| | Report |

Yanggu Sports Complex B, Yanggu

9 June 2017
16:00

| Cheonan City | 2–1 | Gimhae City |
|---|---|---|
| | Report |

Yanggu Sports Complex, Yanggu

9 June 2017
16:00

| Mokpo City | 0–2 | Changwon City |
|---|---|---|
| | Report |

Yanggu Sports Complex B, Yanggu

=== Group B ===
| Team | Pld | W | D | L | GF | GA | GD | Pts |
|---|---|---|---|---|---|---|---|---|
| Gyeongju KHNP | 3 | 2 | 1 | 0 | 8 | 3 | +5 | 7 |
| Daejeon Korail | 3 | 2 | 0 | 1 | 5 | 4 | +1 | 6 |
| Busan Transportation Corporation | 3 | 1 | 0 | 2 | 1 | 5 | –4 | 3 |
| Gangneung City | 3 | 0 | 1 | 2 | 4 | 6 | –2 | 1 |

4 June 2017
16:00

| Gangneung City | 1–2 | Daejeon Korail |
|---|---|---|
| | Report |

Yanggu Sports Complex, Yanggu

4 June 2017
16:00

| Gyeongju KHNP | 2–0 | Busan Transportation Corporation |
|---|---|---|
| | Report |

Yanggu Sports Complex B, Yanggu

7 June 2017
16:00

| Gangneung City | 3–3 | Gyeongju KHNP |
|---|---|---|
| | Report |

Yanggu Sports Complex, Yanggu

7 June 2017
16:00

| Daejeon Korail | 3–0 | Busan Transportation Corporation |
|---|---|---|
| | Report |

Yanggu Sports Complex B, Yanggu

10 June 2017
16:00

| Busan Transportation Corporation | 1–0 | Gangneung City |
|---|---|---|
| | Report |

Yanggu Sports Complex, Yanggu

10 June 2017
16:00

| Gyeongju KHNP | 3–0 | Daejeon Korail |
|---|---|---|
| | Report |

Yanggu Sports Complex B, Yanggu

== Knockout stage ==
=== Bracket ===
Semi-finals
A1 | Cheonan City (p) | 1 (7)
B2 | Daejeon Korail | 1 (6)
B1 | Gyeongju KHNP | 1 (2)
A2 | Changwon City (p) | 1 (4)

Final
Cheonan City | 2 (3)
Changwon City (p) | 2 (4)

=== Semi-finals ===
13 June 2017
16:00

| Cheonan City | 1–1 | Daejeon Korail |
|---|---|---|
| | Report |
Penalties
| | 7–6 |

Yanggu Sports Complex, Yanggu

13 June 2017
16:00

| Gyeongju KHNP | 1–1 | Changwon City |
|---|---|---|
| | Report |
Penalties
| | 2–4 |

Yanggu Sports Complex B, Yanggu

=== Final ===
16 June 2017
16:00

| Cheonan City | 2–2 | Changwon City |
|---|---|---|
| | Report |
Penalties
| | 3–4 |

Yanggu Sports Complex, Yanggu

== See also ==
- 2017 in South Korean football
- 2017 Korea National League
