= 2017 Korea National League =

Incheon International Airport Korea National League
- Season: 2017
- Dates: 18 March – 4 November 2017
- Champions: Gyeongju KHNP (1st title)
- Matches: 56
- Goals: 270 (4.82 per match)
- Best Player: Kim Tae-hong
- Top goalscorer: Bae Hae-min (14 goals)

The 2017 Korea National League, also known as the Incheon International Airport National League 2017 due to the sponsorship of Incheon International Airport, was the 15th season of the Korea National League, the third tier of South Korea's football league system. Each of the eight clubs played four times against all other clubs in the regular season, and the top three clubs of the regular season qualified for the post-season playoffs.

== Teams ==
Locations of the 2017 Korea National League clubs

Team	Location	Stadium
Busan Transportation Corporation	Busan	Busan Gudeok Stadium
Changwon City	Changwon	Changwon Football Center
Cheonan City	Cheonan	Cheonan Stadium
Daejeon Korail	Daejeon	Daejeon Hanbat Stadium
Gangneung City	Gangneung	Gangneung Stadium
Gimhae City	Gimhae	Gimhae Stadium
Gyeongju KHNP	Gyeongju	Gyeongju Civic Stadium
Mokpo City	Mokpo	Mokpo International Football Center

== Regular season ==
=== League table ===
Pos	Team	Pld	W	D	L	GF	GA	GD	Pts	Qualification or relegation
1	Gyeongju KHNP	28	14	9	5	39	21	+18	51	Qualification for the playoffs final
2	Gimhae City	28	12	14	2	38	21	+17	50	Qualification for the playoffs semi-final
3	Cheonan City	28	15	4	9	37	33	+4	49	Qualification for the playoffs semi-final
4	Daejeon Korail	28	10	9	9	31	34	−3	39	
5	Mokpo City	28	8	11	9	35	35	0	35	
6	Changwon City	28	7	8	13	33	36	−3	29	
7	Gangneung City	28	6	8	14	35	47	−12	26	
8	Busan Transportation Corporation	28	5	7	16	22	43	−21	22	

Source: Korea National League
Rules for classification: 1) Points; 2) Goal difference; 3) Goals scored.

=== Positions by matchday ===
Team ╲ Round	1	2	3	4	5	6	7	8	9	10	11	12	13	14	15	16	17	18	19	20	21	22	23	24	25	26	27	28
Gyeongju KHNP	6	6	3	5	5	5	2	2	2	1	3	4	2	2	2	2	1	1	1	2	2	1	1	1	1	1	2	1
Gimhae City	4	2	1	2	2	2	3	3	3	2	1	1	1	1	1	1	2	2	2	1	1	2	2	2	2	2	3	2
Cheonan City	1	4	6	4	3	3	5	6	6	6	6	6	6	5	4	5	4	4	4	3	3	3	3	3	3	3	1	3
Daejeon Korail	1	4	2	1	4	4	4	4	4	5	4	2	3	3	3	3	3	3	3	4	4	4	4	4	4	4	4	4
Mokpo City	7	8	7	6	6	6	6	5	5	4	5	5	5	6	6	4	5	5	5	5	5	5	5	5	5	5	5	5
Changwon City	4	1	4	3	1	1	1	1	1	3	2	3	4	4	5	6	6	6	6	6	6	6	6	6	6	7	6	6
Gangneung City	7	3	5	7	7	7	7	7	7	7	7	7	7	7	7	8	8	8	8	7	8	8	7	7	7	6	7	7
Busan Transportation Corporation	3	7	8	8	8	8	8	8	8	8	8	8	8	8	8	7	7	7	7	8	7	7	8	8	8	8	8	8

Source: Korea National League
= Leaders; = Qualification for the playoffs

== Championship playoffs ==
Semi-final					Final
2	Gimhae City	2	1	3
3	Cheonan City	2	0	2
3	Cheonan City	2	0	2	SF	Gimhae City	1	0	1
					1	Gyeongju KHNP	0	2	2

== See also ==
- 2017 in South Korean football
- 2017 Korea National League Championship
- 2017 Korean FA Cup
