= 2018 Korea National League Championship =

Tournament details
- Country: South Korea
- Cities: Yanggu, Gangwon
- Dates: 30 May – 12 June 2018
- Teams: 8

Final positions
- Champions: Daejeon Korail (3rd title)
- Runners-up: Gyeongju KHNP

Tournament statistics
- Matches played: 15
- Top goal scorer: Jo Ju-young (3 goals)

Awards
- Best player: Kim Dong-min
- Best goalkeeper: Lim Hyeong-geun

The 2018 Korea National League Championship was the 15th competition of the Korea National League Championship, the third-tier of the South Korean football league system at the time.

== Group stage ==
=== Group A ===
| Team | Pld | W | D | L | GF | GA | GD | Pts |
|---|---|---|---|---|---|---|---|---|
| Cheonan City | 3 | 3 | 0 | 0 | 5 | 1 | +4 | 9 |
| Gimhae City | 3 | 2 | 0 | 1 | 7 | 3 | +4 | 6 |
| Busan Transportation Corporation | 3 | 0 | 1 | 2 | 3 | 5 | –2 | 1 |
| Changwon City | 3 | 0 | 1 | 2 | 2 | 8 | –6 | 1 |

30 May 2018
14:00

| Changwon City | 0–4 | Gimhae City |
|---|---|---|
| | Report |

Yanggu Sports Complex, Yanggu

30 May 2018
16:00

| Busan Transportation Corporation | 0–1 | Cheonan City |
|---|---|---|
| | Report |

Yanggu Sports Complex, Yanggu

2 June 2018
16:00

| Changwon City | 2–2 | Busan Transportation Corporation |
|---|---|---|
| | Report |

Yanggu Sports Complex, Yanggu

2 June 2018
16:00

| Gimhae City | 1–2 | Cheonan City |
|---|---|---|
| | Report |

Yanggu Sports Complex B, Yanggu

5 June 2018
16:00

| Cheonan City | 2–0 | Changwon City |
|---|---|---|
| | Report |

Yanggu Sports Complex, Yanggu

5 June 2018
16:00

| Busan Transportation Corporation | 1–2 | Gimhae City |
|---|---|---|
| | Report |

Yanggu Sports Complex B, Yanggu

=== Group B ===
| Team | Pld | W | D | L | GF | GA | GD | Pts |
|---|---|---|---|---|---|---|---|---|
| Gyeongju KHNP | 3 | 2 | 0 | 1 | 4 | 1 | +3 | 6 |
| Daejeon Korail | 3 | 2 | 0 | 1 | 5 | 3 | +2 | 6 |
| Gangneung City | 3 | 2 | 0 | 1 | 5 | 4 | +1 | 6 |
| Mokpo City | 3 | 0 | 0 | 3 | 3 | 9 | –6 | 0 |

31 May 2018
16:00

| Gangneung City | 0–1 | Gyeongju KHNP |
|---|---|---|
| | Report |

Yanggu Sports Complex, Yanggu

31 May 2018
16:00

| Mokpo City | 1–3 | Daejeon Korail |
|---|---|---|
| | Report |

Yanggu Sports Complex B, Yanggu

3 June 2018
16:00

| Gangneung City | 3–2 | Mokpo City |
|---|---|---|
| | Report |

Yanggu Sports Complex, Yanggu

3 June 2018
16:00

| Gyeongju KHNP | 0–1 | Daejeon Korail |
|---|---|---|
| | Report |

Yanggu Sports Complex B, Yanggu

6 June 2018
16:00

| Daejeon Korail | 1–2 | Gangneung City |
|---|---|---|
| | Report |

Yanggu Sports Complex, Yanggu

6 June 2018
16:00

| Mokpo City | 0–3 | Gyeongju KHNP |
|---|---|---|
| | Report |

Yanggu Sports Complex B, Yanggu

== Knockout stage ==
=== Bracket ===
Semi-finals
A1 | Cheonan City | 1
B2 | Daejeon Korail | 2
B1 | Gyeongju KHNP | 2
A2 | Gimhae City | 0

Final
Daejeon Korail | 2
Gyeongju KHNP | 1

=== Semi-finals ===
9 June 2018
16:00

| Cheonan City | 1–2 | Daejeon Korail |
|---|---|---|
| | Report |

Yanggu Sports Complex, Yanggu

9 June 2018
16:00

| Gyeongju KHNP | 2–0 | Gimhae City |
|---|---|---|
| | Report |

Yanggu Sports Complex B, Yanggu

=== Final ===
11 June 2018
16:00

| Daejeon Korail | 2–1 | Gyeongju KHNP |
|---|---|---|
| | Report |

Yanggu Sports Complex, Yanggu

== See also ==
- 2018 in South Korean football
- 2018 Korea National League
