= 2007 Korea National League Championship =

Tournament details
- Country: South Korea
- City: Yanggu, Gangwon
- Dates: 5–16 July 2007
- Teams: 16

Final positions
- Champions: Suwon City (2nd title)
- Runner-up: Goyang KB Kookmin Bank

Tournament statistics
- Top goal scorer(s): Ko Min-gi (7 goals)

Awards
- Best player: Park Hee-wan
- Best goalkeeper: Kim Ji-woon

The 2007 Korea National League Championship was the fourth competition of the Korea National League Championship. Cheonan FC, Jeonju EM, Asan FC and Gumi Siltron were invited to the competition.

== Group stage ==
=== Group A ===
Pos	Team	Pld	W	D	L	GF	GA	GD	Pts	BTC	HMD	GMS	KHN
1	Busan Transportation Corporation	3	2	1	0	4	2	+2	7	—	2–1	0–0	2–1
2	Hyundai Mipo Dockyard	3	2	0	1	5	4	+1	6		—	1–0	3–2
3	Gumi Siltron	3	1	1	1	1	1	0	4			—	1–0
4	Daejeon KHNP	3	0	0	3	4	7	−3	0				—

Source: Report

=== Group B ===
Pos	Team	Pld	W	D	L	GF	GA	GD	Pts	GKB	CWC	ASH	JEM
1	Goyang KB Kookmin Bank	3	3	0	0	10	1	+9	9	—	2–1	2–0	6–0
2	Changwon City	3	2	0	1	12	5	+7	6		—	3–1	8–2
3	Ansan Hallelujah	3	1	0	2	0	0	0	3			—	4–0
4	Jeonju EM	3	0	0	3	2	18	−16	0				—

Source: Report

=== Group C ===
Pos	Team	Pld	W	D	L	GF	GA	GD	Pts	SWC	ICK	IHK	ASA
1	Suwon City	3	3	0	0	9	0	+9	9	—	1–0	1–0	7–0
2	Incheon Korail	3	2	0	1	12	3	+9	6		—	3–2	9–0
3	Icheon Hummel Korea	3	1	0	2	10	4	+6	3			—	8–0
4	Asan FC	3	0	0	3	0	24	−24	0				—

Source: Report

=== Group D ===
Pos	Team	Pld	W	D	L	GF	GA	GD	Pts	GNC	SSC	CHE	YEO
1	Gangneung City	3	2	1	0	5	0	+5	7	—	0–0	2–0	3–0
2	Seosan Omega	3	2	1	0	3	1	+2	7		—	1–0	2–1
3	Cheonan FC	3	0	1	2	1	4	−3	1			—	1–1
4	Yeosu INGNEX	3	0	1	2	2	6	−4	1				—

Source: Report

== Knockout stage ==
=== Bracket ===
Quarter-finals
Busan Transportation Corporation	0
Incheon Korail	1
Goyang KB Kookmin Bank	6
Seosan Omega	4
Suwon City	2
Hyundai Mipo Dockyard	0
Gangneung City	0
Changwon City	1

Semi-finals
Incheon Korail	0
Goyang KB Kookmin Bank	4
Suwon City (p)	0 (4)
Changwon City	0 (2)

Final
Goyang KB Kookmin Bank	0
Suwon City	1

=== Quarter-finals ===
12 July 2007
14:00 UTC+9

Busan Transportation Corporation	0–1	Incheon Korail
	Report

Yanggu Sports Complex B, Yanggu

12 July 2007
14:00 UTC+9

Goyang KB Kookmin Bank	6–4	Seosan Omega
	Report

Yanggu Sports Complex A, Yanggu

12 July 2007
16:00 UTC+9

Suwon City	2–0	Hyundai Mipo Dockyard
	Report

Yanggu Sports Complex B, Yanggu

12 July 2007
16:00 UTC+9

Gangneung City	0–1	Changwon City
	Report

Yanggu Sports Complex A, Yanggu

=== Semi-finals ===
14 July 2007
14:00 UTC+9

Incheon Korail	0–4	Goyang KB Kookmin Bank
	Report

Yanggu Sports Complex A, Yanggu

14 July 2007
16:00 UTC+9

Suwon City	0–0 (a.e.t.)	Changwon City FC
	Report
Penalties
	4–2

Yanggu Sports Complex A, Yanggu

=== Final ===
16 July 2007
14:00 UTC+9

Goyang KB Kookmin Bank	0–1	Suwon City
	Report

Yanggu Sports Complex A, Yanggu

== See also ==
- 2007 in South Korean football
- 2007 Korea National League
