= 2016 Korea National League Championship =

2017 Korea National League Championship
Tournament details
- Country: South Korea
- Cities: Yanggu, Gangwon
- Dates: 1–14 June 2016
- Teams: 10

Final positions
- Champions: Hyundai Mipo Dockyard (3rd title)
- Runners-up: Daejeon Korail

Tournament statistics
- Matches played: 23
- Top goal scorer: Lee In-gyu (3 goals)

Awards
- Best player: Jeong Hyeon-sik
- Best goalkeeper: Hwang Sung-min

The 2016 Korea National League Championship was the 13th competition of the Korea National League Championship. Although the finalists were the same as the previous year, the winner and runner-up were reversed their positions this time.

== Group stage ==
=== Group A ===
Team	Pld	W	D	L	GF	GA	GD	Pts
Daejeon Korail	4	3	1	0	4	1	+3	10
Mokpo City	4	3	0	1	7	2	+5	9
Gyeongju KHNP	4	2	0	2	4	5	–1	6
Changwon City	4	1	0	3	6	5	+1	3
Gangneung City	4	0	1	3	0	8	–8	1

1 Jun 2016
14:00

Daejeon Korail	1–0	Mokpo City
	Report

Yanggu Sports Complex, Yanggu

1 Jun 2016
16:00

Changwon City	4–0	Gangneung City
	Report

Yanggu Sports Complex, Yanggu

3 June 2016
16:00

Daejeon Korail	1–0	Gyeongju KHNP
	Report

Yanggu Sports Complex, Yanggu

3 June 2016
16:00

Mokpo City	1–0	Changwon City
	Report

Yanggu Sports Complex B, Yanggu

5 June 2016
16:00

Gangneung City	0–3	Mokpo City
	Report

Yanggu Sports Complex, Yanggu

5 June 2016
16:00

Gyeongju KHNP	2–1	Changwon City
	Report

Yanggu Sports Complex B, Yanggu

7 June 2016
16:00

Changwon City	1–2	Daejeon Korail
	Report

Yanggu Sports Complex, Yanggu

7 June 2016
16:00

Gyeongju KHNP	1–0	Gangneung City
	Report

Yanggu Sports Complex B, Yanggu

9 June 2016
16:00

Mokpo City	3–1	Gyeongju KHNP
	Report

Yanggu Sports Complex, Yanggu

9 June 2016
16:00

Gangneung City	0–0	Daejeon Korail
	Report

Yanggu Sports Complex B, Yanggu

=== Group B ===
Team	Pld	W	D	L	GF	GA	GD	Pts
Hyundai Mipo Dockyard	4	3	1	0	10	3	+7	10
Gimhae City	4	2	1	1	9	7	+2	7
Yongin City	4	2	0	2	5	5	0	6
Cheonan City	4	1	0	3	4	8	–4	3
Busan Transportation Corporation	4	1	0	3	2	7	–5	3

2 June 2016
16:00

Busan Transportation Corporation	0–1	Yongin City
	Report

Yanggu Sports Complex, Yanggu

2 June 2016
16:00

Cheonan City	2–3	Gimhae City
	Report

Yanggu Sports Complex B, Yanggu

4 June 2016
16:00

Busan Transportation Corporation	0–3	Hyundai Mipo Dockyard
	Report

Yanggu Sports Complex, Yanggu

4 June 2016
16:00

Yongin City	1–2	Cheonan City
	Report

Yanggu Sports Complex B, Yanggu

6 Jun 2016
16:00

Gimhae City	1–2	Yongin City
	Report

Yanggu Sports Complex, Yanggu

6 June 2016
16:00

Hyundai Mipo Dockyard	3–0	Cheonan City
	Report

Yanggu Sports Complex B, Yanggu

8 June 2016
16:00

Cheonan City	0–1	Busan Transportation Corporation
	Report

Yanggu Sports Complex, Yanggu

8 June 2016
16:00

Hyundai Mipo Dockyard	2–2	Gimhae City
	Report

Yanggu Sports Complex B, Yanggu

10 June 2016
16:00

Yongin City	1–2	Hyundai Mipo Dockyard
	Report

Yanggu Sports Complex, Yanggu

10 Jun 2016
16:00

Gimhae City	3–1	Busan Transportation Corporation
	Report

Yanggu Sports Complex B, Yanggu

== Knockout stage ==
=== Bracket ===
Semifinals
A1	Daejeon Korail (p)	0 (6)
B2	Gimhae City	0 (5)
B1	Hyundai Mipo Dockyard (p)	1 (7)
A2	Mokpo City	1 (6)

Final
Daejeon Korail	0
Hyundai Mipo Dockyard	1

=== Semi-finals ===
12 June 2016
14:00

Daejeon Korail	0–0	Gimhae City
	Report
Penalties
	6–5

Yanggu Sports Complex, Yanggu

12 June 2016
16:00

Hyundai Mipo Dockyard	1–1	Mokpo City
	Report
Penalties
	7–6

Yanggu Sports Complex, Yanggu

=== Final ===
14 June 2016
16:00

Daejeon Korail	0–1	Hyundai Mipo Dockyard
	Report

Yanggu Sports Complex, Yanggu

== See also ==
- 2016 in South Korean football
- 2016 Korea National League
