= Koo Sang-min =

South Korean footballer (born 1991)

Koo Sang-Min
Personal information
- Full name: Koo Sang-Min
- Date of birth: 31 October 1991 (age 35)
- Place of birth: South Korea
- Height: 1.85 m (6 ft 1 in)
- Position: Goalkeeper

Team information
- Current team: Busan IPark
- Number: 1

Senior career*
Years	Team	Apps	(Gls)
2014–2015	Ulsan Dolphins	55	(1)
2016–	Busan IPark	205	(0)
2019–2021	Yangju Citizen FC (loan)	18	(0)
- * Club domestic league appearances and goals as of 5 August 2026

Koo Sang-Min (Korean: 구상민; born 31 October 1991) is a South Korean footballer who plays as a goalkeeper for Busan IPark.

== Career ==
While playing for Ulsan Dolphins, Koo scored a goal directly from a goal kick on 25 June 2014 in a victory over Gimhae City. At the time it was recorded as the longest goal of all time. The following year, he was named as the National League MVP as Ulsan finished top of the division.

Koo signed with Busan IPark from Ulsan Dolphins on 13 January 2016. Koo was first-choice keeper in his first season with the club, conceding 25 goals in 32 games, but he later faced competition for the starting spot from the likes of Kim Hyung-keun and Kim Kyeong-min. Midway through the 2019 season Koo left to complete his mandatory military service with Yangju Citizen FC in the K League 3 before returning to Busan in April 2021. Koo found himself back-up keeper to Ahn Joon-soo under struggling Portuguese manager Ricardo Peres, but replacement coach Park Jin-sub reinstated Koo to the starting line-up midway through the 2022 season.

In 2023, Koo played every minute of every game for Busan as they finished second in the league, with the club missing out on promotion after a 4-6 two-leg aggregate defeat to Suwon FC in the play-offs. Koo kept 15 clean sheets and was named in the K League 2 Best XI for the season. Following the 2023 season, only goalkeeper Kim Poong-joo has kept more clean sheets for Busan in the club's history.

== Career statistics ==
As of 12 December 2023

Appearances and goals by club, season and competition
Club	Season	League			Cup		Play-offs		Total	
Club	Season	Division	Apps	Goals	Apps	Goals	Apps	Goals	Apps	Goals
Ulsan Dolphins	2014	National League	27	1	1	0	-	-	28	1
Ulsan Dolphins	2015	National League	28	0	2	0	-	-	30	0
Busan IPark	2016	K League 2	32	0	1	0	0	0	33	0
Busan IPark	2017	K League 2	13	0	3	0	1	0	17	0
Busan IPark	2018	K League 2	21	0	1	0	2	0	24	0
Busan IPark	2019	K League 2	2	0	1	0	0	0	3	0
Yangju Citizen FC	2020	K3 League	18	0	0	0	0	0	18	0
Busan IPark	2021	K League 2	1	0	0	0	0	0	1	0
Busan IPark	2022	K League 2	16	0	1	0	0	0	17	0
Busan IPark	2023	K League 2	36	0	0	0	2	0	38	0
Career total			194	1	10	0	5	0	209	1
