= 2014 Korea National League =

Samsung Life Korea National League
- Season: 2014
- Dates: 8 March – 8 November 2014
- Champions: Hyundai Mipo Dockyard (5th title)
- Matches: 90
- Goals: 313 (3.48 per match)
- Best player: Lee Yong-joon
- Top goalscorer: Kim Oh-sung (16 goals)

The 2014 Korea National League, also known as the Samsung Life National League 2014 due to the sponsorship of Samsung Life Insurance, was the twelfth season of the Korea National League. Each of the ten clubs played three games against every other club in the regular season. The top four clubs of the regular season qualified for the post-season playoffs.

== Teams ==
Locations of the 2014 Korea National League clubs

Team	Location	Stadium
Busan Transportation Corporation	Busan	Busan Gudeok Stadium
Changwon City	Changwon	Changwon Football Center
Cheonan City	Cheonan	Cheonan Stadium
Daejeon Korail	Daejeon	Daejeon Hanbat Stadium
Gangneung City	Gangneung	Gangneung Stadium
Gimhae City	Gimhae	Gimhae Stadium
Gyeongju KHNP	Gyeongju	Gyeongju Civic Stadium
Hyundai Mipo Dockyard	Ulsan	Ulsan Stadium
Mokpo City	Mokpo	Mokpo International Football Center
Yongin City	Yongin	Yongin Football Center

== Regular season ==
=== League table ===
Pos	Team	Pld	W	D	L	GF	GA	GD	Pts	Qualification or relegation
1	Daejeon Korail	27	14	7	6	41	28	+13	49	Qualification for the playoffs final
2	Hyundai Mipo Dockyard	27	14	6	7	44	28	+16	48	Qualification for the playoffs semi-final
3	Gyeongju KHNP	27	14	6	7	41	28	+13	48	Qualification for the playoffs first round
4	Gangneung City	27	10	11	6	41	33	+8	41	Qualification for the playoffs first round
5	Busan Transportation Corporation	27	12	4	11	30	32	−2	40	
6	Changwon City	27	11	3	13	38	38	0	36	
7	Cheonan City	27	10	4	13	25	30	−5	34	
8	Mokpo City	27	8	8	11	28	39	−11	32	
9	Gimhae City	27	6	8	13	25	42	−17	26	
10	Yongin City	27	4	7	16	30	45	−15	19	

Source: Korea National League
Rules for classification: 1) Points; 2) Goal difference; 3) Goals scored.

=== Positions by matchday ===
Team ╲ Round	1	2	3	4	5	6	7	8	9	10	11	12	13	14	15	16	17	18	19	20	21	22	23	24	25	26	27
Daejeon Korail	7	3	3	2	5	6	4	5	3	4	4	4	4	4	3	3	3	3	2	2	1	1	2	1	2	1	1
Hyundai Mipo Dockyard	8	6	4	6	6	5	6	6	4	3	2	1	3	2	1	1	2	2	3	3	2	2	1	2	1	2	2
Gyeongju KHNP	9	5	6	5	4	2	2	2	2	2	3	2	1	1	2	2	1	1	1	1	3	3	3	3	3	3	3
Gangneung City	2	1	2	1	2	3	3	4	6	5	5	5	5	5	5	5	5	6	5	5	5	5	5	5	5	5	4
Busan Transportation Corporation	1	3	4	3	1	1	1	1	1	1	1	3	2	3	4	4	4	4	4	4	4	4	4	4	4	4	5
Changwon City	6	9	6	8	9	9	10	10	9	10	10	9	9	9	9	9	9	10	10	8	8	8	8	7	6	6	6
Cheonan City	3	7	8	7	7	7	7	7	7	7	7	8	6	6	6	6	6	5	6	7	7	6	6	6	7	7	7
Mokpo City	5	2	1	4	3	4	5	3	5	6	6	6	7	7	7	7	7	7	7	6	6	7	7	8	8	8	8
Gimhae City	4	8	9	9	8	8	8	8	8	8	8	7	8	8	8	8	8	8	9	10	9	9	10	9	9	9	9
Yongin City	10	10	10	10	10	10	9	9	10	9	9	10	10	10	10	10	10	9	8	9	10	10	9	10	10	10	10

Source: Korea National League
= Leaders; = Qualification for the playoffs

=== Results ===
==== Matches 1–18 ====
Home \ Away	BTC	CWC	CAC	DJK	GNC	GHC	GHN	HMD	MPC	YIC
Busan Transportation Corporation	—	1–3	3–0	2–1	0–1	2–1	1–0	0–1	1–1	0–2
Changwon City	0–1	—	2–1	0–3	2–0	0–1	2–0	1–2	2–1	3–1
Cheonan City	0–1	3–2	—	1–2	1–1	3–0	0–2	1–2	1–0	1–0
Daejeon Korail	1–2	0–1	0–1	—	2–1	2–0	0–3	2–2	3–0	2–1
Gangneung City	1–3	3–2	2–0	1–2	—	0–0	2–0	2–2	4–0	3–0
Gimhae City	1–0	0–2	0–1	0–2	1–0	—	1–1	0–1	0–0	2–2
Gyeongju KHNP	0–1	2–1	2–1	0–0	0–1	4–1	—	2–0	1–0	3–1
Hyundai Mipo Dockyard	2–0	0–1	2–0	0–1	1–1	0–0	1–1	—	0–1	3–2
Mokpo City	1–1	1–0	3–1	2–2	1–2	4–1	3–1	2–0	—	2–2
Yongin City	0–2	0–1	1–1	0–1	1–1	1–2	1–2	1–3	3–0	—

Source: Korea National League (in Korean)
Legend: Blue = home team win; Yellow = draw; Red = away team win.

==== Matches 19–27 ====
Home \ Away	BTC	CWC	CAC	DJK	GNC	GHC	GHN	HMD	MPC	YIC
Busan Transportation Corporation	—	—	—	1–1	—	2–1	0–1	1–4	—	—
Changwon City	2–3	—	1–2	1–2	—	3–3	—	0–1	—	—
Cheonan City	3–0	—	—	—	1–1	—	0–1	—	—	—
Daejeon Korail	—	—	0–0	—	2–2	—	3–2	3–3	1–2	—
Gangneung City	1–1	1–1	—	—	—	2–1	2–2	—	2–1	—
Gimhae City	—	—	0–1	2–1	—	—	2–2	—	—	3–2
Gyeongju KHNP	—	3–2	—	—	—	—	—	2–1	4–1	0–0
Hyundai Mipo Dockyard	—	—	1–0	—	3–1	4–1	—	—	3–0	1–2
Mokpo City	1–0	1–1	1–0	—	—	0–0	—	—	—	1–1
Yongin City	2–1	1–2	0–1	0–1	3–3	—	—	—	—	—

Source: Korea National League (in Korean)
Legend: Blue = home team win; Yellow = draw; Red = away team win.

== Championship playoffs ==
=== Bracket ===
First round
3	Gyeongju KHNP	2	4	6
4	Gangneung City	1	2	3

Semi-final
2	Hyundai Mipo Dockyard	1	2	3
1R	Gyeongju KHNP	1	1	2

Final
SF	Hyundai Mipo Dockyard	2	1	3
1	Daejeon Korail	0	1	1

=== First round ===
5 November 2014
15:00

Gangneung City	1–2	Gyeongju KHNP
Ko Byung-wook 82'		Jo Gyu-seung 36'; Yoo Dong-min 57'

Gangneung Stadium subground, Gangneung
Attendance: 500
Referee: Kim Ki-hyun

8 November 2014
15:00

Gyeongju KHNP	4–2	Gangneung City
Kim Oh-sung 52', 61'; Kim Young-nam 53'; Yoo Dong-min 56'		Kim Jung-joo 16'; Ko Byung-wook 48'

Gyeongju Civic Stadium, Gyeongju, Gyeongbuk
Attendance: 700
Referee: Kim Woo-sung

Gyeongju KHNP won 6–3 on aggregate.

=== Semi-final ===
12 November 2014
15:00

Gyeongju KHNP	1–1	Hyundai Mipo Dockyard
Jin Chang-soo 6'		Lee Dong-hyun 2'

Gyeongju Civic Stadium, Gyeongju
Attendance: 300
Referee: Ju Kyung-ho

15 November 2014
15:00

Hyundai Mipo Dockyard	2–1	Gyeongju KHNP
Park Dong-hoon 41'; Lee Dong-hyun 88'		Kim Young-nam 60'

Ulsan Stadium, Ulsan
Referee: Lim Jeong-su

Hyundai Mipo Dockyard won 3–2 on aggregate.

=== Final ===
19 November 2014
19:00

Hyundai Mipo Dockyard	2–0	Daejeon Korail
Lee Dong-hyun 45', 71'

Ulsan Stadium, Ulsan
Attendance: 730
Referee: Park Young-rok

22 November 2014
15:00

Daejeon Korail	1–1	Hyundai Mipo Dockyard
Woo Joo-young 41'		Kwon Su-hyun 37'

Daejeon Hanbat Stadium, Daejeon

Hyundai Mipo Dockyard won 3–1 on aggregate.

== See also ==
- 2014 in South Korean football
- 2014 Korea National League Championship
- 2014 Korean FA Cup
