= Ko Jae-hyo =

South Korean footballer

Ko Jae-Hyo
Personal information
- Full name: Ko Jae-Hyo
- Date of birth: December 3, 1980 (age 45)
- Place of birth: South Korea
- Height: 1.75 m (5 ft 9 in)
- Position: Striker

Senior career*
Years	Team	Apps	(Gls)
2003–2011	Suwon City	31	(17)
2012	PSPS Pekanbaru	9	(0)
- * Club domestic league appearances and goals as of 10:24, 19 June 2012 (UTC)

- Ko Jae-hyo
- Hangul: 고재호
- RR: Go Jaeho
- MR: Ko Chaeho

Ko Jae-Hyo (Korean: 고재호; born December 3, 1980) is a South Korean former footballer who plays as a striker.

== Honours ==
=== Club honors ===
Suwon City

- Korea National League (1): 2010
- Korea National League Championship (2): 2005, 2007
- Korean President's Cup (2): 2004, 2007
