= 2015 Korea National League Championship =

Tournament details
- Country: South Korea
- City: Yanggu, Gangwon
- Dates: 2–15 June 2015
- Teams: 10

Final positions
- Champions: Daejeon Korail (2nd title)
- Runners-up: Hyundai Mipo Dockyard

Tournament statistics
- Matches played: 23
- Top goal scorer(s): Hwang Cheol-hwan (3 goals)

Awards
- Best player: Shin Eun-yeol
- Best goalkeeper: Jung Eui-do

The 2015 Korea National League Championship, known as the Samsung Life 2015 National League Championship, was the twelfth competition of the Korea National League Championship.

== Group stage ==
=== Group A ===
| Team | Pld | W | D | L | GF | GA | GD | Pts |
|---|---|---|---|---|---|---|---|---|
| Daejeon Korail | 4 | 2 | 1 | 1 | 5 | 3 | +2 | 7 |
| Gyeongju KHNP | 4 | 1 | 3 | 0 | 6 | 4 | +2 | 6 |
| Mokpo City | 4 | 1 | 2 | 1 | 2 | 2 | 0 | 5 |
| Changwon City | 4 | 1 | 2 | 1 | 3 | 6 | –3 | 5 |
| Yongin City | 4 | 1 | 0 | 3 | 5 | 6 | –1 | 3 |

2 June 2015
14:00

| Gyeongju KHNP | 3–1 | Yongin City |
|---|---|---|
| | Report |

Yanggu Sports Complex, Yanggu

2 June 2015
16:00

| Mokpo City | 1–1 | Changwon City |
|---|---|---|
| | Report |

Yanggu Sports Complex, Yanggu

4 June 2015
16:00

| Gyeongju KHNP | 2–2 | Daejeon Korail |
|---|---|---|
| | Report |

Yanggu Sports Complex, Yanggu

4 June 2015
16:00

| Yongin City | 0–1 | Mokpo City |
|---|---|---|
| | Report |

Yanggu Sports Complex B, Yanggu

6 June 2015
16:00

| Changwon City | 0–4 | Yongin City |
|---|---|---|
| | Report |

Yanggu Sports Complex, Yanggu

6 June 2015
16:00

| Daejeon Korail | 1–0 | Mokpo City |
|---|---|---|
| | Report |

Yanggu Sports Complex B, Yanggu

8 June 2015
16:00

| Mokpo City | 0–0 | Gyeongju KHNP |
|---|---|---|
| | Report |

Yanggu Sports Complex, Yanggu

8 June 2015
16:00

| Daejeon Korail | 0–1 | Changwon City |
|---|---|---|
| | Report |

Yanggu Sports Complex B, Yanggu

10 June 2015
16:00

| Yongin City | 0–2 | Daejeon Korail |
|---|---|---|
| | Report |

Yanggu Sports Complex, Yanggu

10 June 2015
16:00

| Changwon City | 1–1 | Gyeongju KHNP |
|---|---|---|
| | Report |

Yanggu Sports Complex B, Yanggu

=== Group B ===
| Team | Pld | W | D | L | GF | GA | GD | Pts |
|---|---|---|---|---|---|---|---|---|
| Hyundai Mipo Dockyard | 4 | 3 | 1 | 0 | 9 | 1 | +8 | 10 |
| Gimhae City | 4 | 2 | 1 | 1 | 4 | 6 | –2 | 7 |
| Cheonan City | 4 | 1 | 2 | 1 | 7 | 8 | –1 | 5 |
| Gangneung City | 4 | 1 | 1 | 2 | 5 | 7 | 0 | 4 |
| Busan Transportation Corporation | 4 | 0 | 1 | 3 | 4 | 7 | –3 | 1 |

3 June 2015
16:00

| Hyundai Mipo Dockyard | 1–1 | Gangneung City |
|---|---|---|
| | Report |

Yanggu Sports Complex, Yanggu

3 June 2015
16:00

| Gimhae City | 1–1 | Cheonan City |
|---|---|---|
| | Report |

Yanggu Sports Complex B, Yanggu

5 June 2015
16:00

| Hyundai Mipo Dockyard | 1–0 | Busan Transportation Corporation |
|---|---|---|
| | Report |

Yanggu Sports Complex, Yanggu

5 June 2015
16:00

| Gangneung City | 0–1 | Gimhae City |
|---|---|---|
| | Report |

Yanggu Sports Complex B, Yanggu

7 June 2015
16:00

| Cheonan City | 4–2 | Gangneung City |
|---|---|---|
| | Report |

Yanggu Sports Complex, Yanggu

7 June 2015
16:00

| Busan Transportation Corporation | 1–2 | Gimhae City |
|---|---|---|
| | Report |

Yanggu Sports Complex B, Yanggu

9 June 2015
16:00

| Gimhae City | 0–4 | Hyundai Mipo Dockyard |
|---|---|---|
| | Report |

Yanggu Sports Complex, Yanggu

9 June 2015
16:00

| Busan Transportation Corporation | 2–2 | Cheonan City |
|---|---|---|
| | Report |

Yanggu Sports Complex B, Yanggu

11 June 2015
16:00

| Gangneung City | 2–1 | Busan Transportation Corporation |
|---|---|---|
| | Report |

Yanggu Sports Complex, Yanggu

11 June 2015
16:00

| Cheonan City | 0–3 | Hyundai Mipo Dockyard |
|---|---|---|
| | Report |

Yanggu Sports Complex B, Yanggu

== Knockout stage ==
=== Bracket ===
Semifinals
A1 | Daejeon Korail | 2
B2 | Gimhae City | 1
B1 | Hyundai Mipo Dockyard | 3
A2 | Gyeongju KHNP | 2

Final
Daejeon Korail | 2
Hyundai Mipo Dockyard | 1

=== Semi-finals ===
13 June 2015
16:00

| Daejeon Korail | 2–1 | Gimhae City |
|---|---|---|
| | Report |

Yanggu Sports Complex, Yanggu

13 June 2015
16:00

| Hyundai Mipo Dockyard | 3–2 | Gyeongju KHNP |
|---|---|---|
| | Report |

Yanggu Sports Complex B, Yanggu

=== Final ===
15 June 2015
16:00

| Daejeon Korail | 2–1 | Hyundai Mipo Dockyard |
|---|---|---|
| | Report |

Yanggu Sports Complex, Yanggu

== See also ==
- 2015 in South Korean football
- 2015 Korea National League
