= Park Jin-seob (footballer, born 1995) =

South Korean footballer

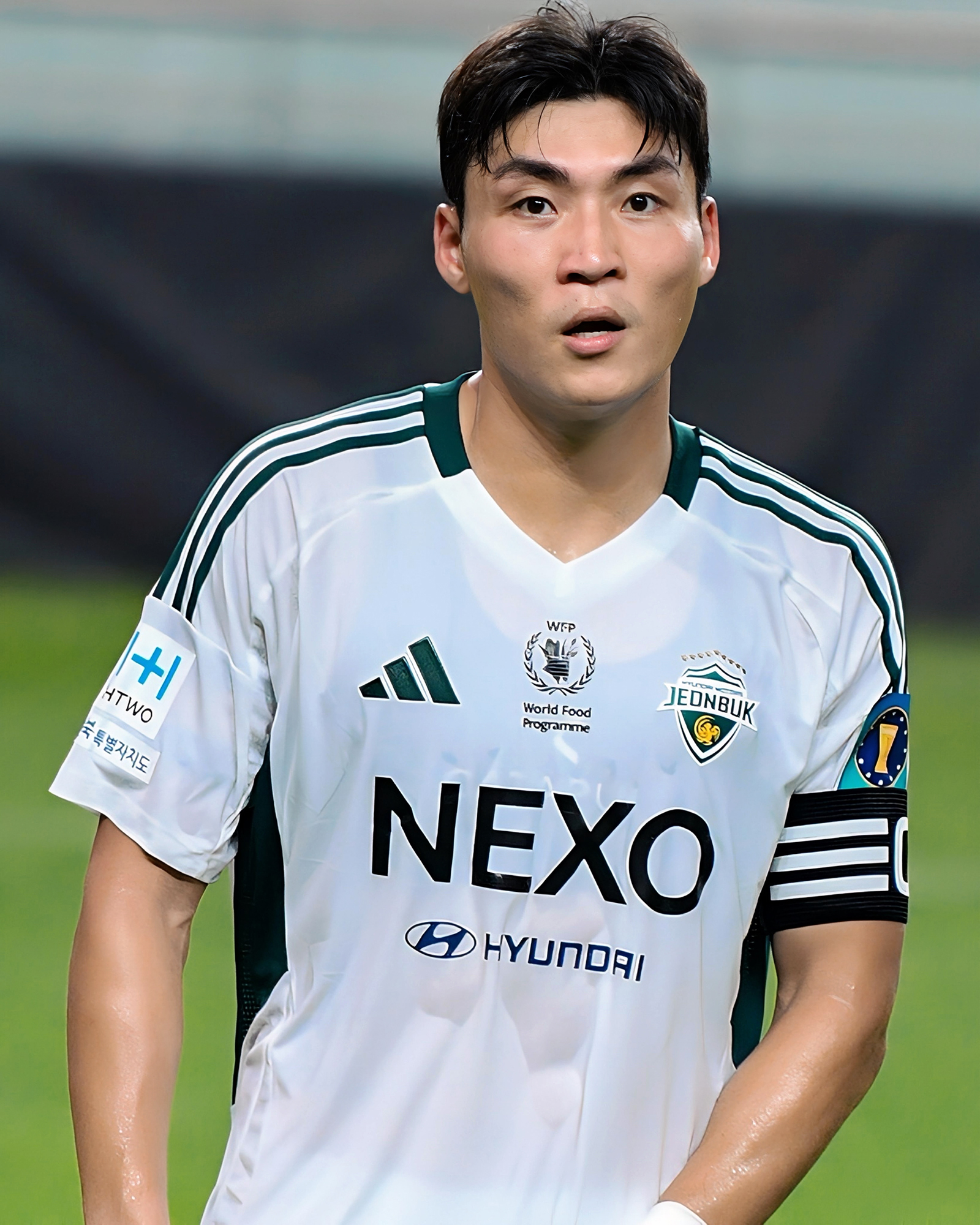
- Park in 2025

Personal information
- Date of birth: 23 October 1995 (age 31)
- Place of birth: Jeonju, South Korea
- Height: 1.84 m (6 ft 1/2 in)
- Positions: Defensive midfielder; centre-back

Team information
- Current team: Zhejiang FC
- Number: 4

Youth career
- 2011–2013: Jeonju Technical High School

College career
Years	Team	Apps	(Gls)
2014–2016	Digital Seoul Culture; Arts University		

Senior career*
Years	Team	Apps	(Gls)
2017	Daejeon Korail	25	(11)
2018–2019	Ansan Greeners	62	(7)
2020–2021	Daejeon Hana Citizen	54	(7)
2022–2025	Jeonbuk Hyundai Motors	127	(6)
2026–	Zhejiang FC	27	(2)

International career^{‡}
2023	South Korea U23	6 (Note: Appearances as an overage player in Asian Games)	(0)
2023–	South Korea	21	(1)
Medal record
Men's football
Representing South Korea
Asian Games
Gold medal – first place	2022 Hangzhou
EAFF Championship
Runner-up	2025 South Korea
- * Club domestic league appearances and goals as of 8 November 2026 ‡ National team caps and goals as of 13 November 2026

- Park Jin-seob
- Hangul: 박진섭
- Hanja: 朴鎭燮
- RR: Bak Jinseop
- MR: Pak Chinsŏp
- IPA: [pak̚.t͈͡ɕin.sʌp̚]

Park Jin-seob (Korean: 박진섭; born 23 October 1995) is a South Korean professional footballer who plays as a defensive midfielder or a centre-back for Chinese Super League club Zhejiang FC and the South Korea national team.

== Club career ==
Park played as a footballer at all of his elementary, middle and high schools in Jeonju, but had difficulty in entering university. After enrolling at the football club of Digital Seoul Culture Arts University narrowly, he became known as one of regional top goalscorers at the U-League in 2014 and 2016. He prepared to join K League 2 club Daejeon Citizen by attracting club's manager Choi Moon-sik before the 2017 season, but the plan was cancelled due to Choi's dismissal. Instead, he moved to semi-professional club Daejeon Korail, playing at the Korea National League for a year.

Park joined another K League 2 club Ansan Greeners in 2018, becoming a professional player. He was the second top goalscorer at the 2017 Korea National League, but changed his role to a defensive midfielder at Ansan. His performance at midfield for two years received attention from Daejeon Citizen (reorganised as Daejeon Hana Citizen in 2020), and it gave him an offer. He had had an ill feeling toward Daejeon due to the cancellation of his former agreement with it, but decided to trust it. He captained the club in his first season, and was named in the K League 2 Best XI the next year. Afterwards, he could go to Jeonbuk Hyundai Motors, his dream club located in his hometown Jeonju.

Park joined Jeonbuk Hyundai Motors before the start of the 2022 season, challenging himself at the K League 1. When playing for Jeonbuk, he once again changed his role to a centre-back. His versatile talents led him to adapt quickly in the rearmost position. In his first season at Jeonbuk, he was selected for the K League 1 Best XI, and won the Korean FA Cup. He was appointed captain of the club in the second half of the 2024 season, but reproached himself for the decrease of his capability and poor results of the club at the end of the season. His team had finished 10th among 12 clubs at the league and avoided relegation after winning relegation play-offs. The next year, his ability bounced back under new manager Gus Poyet, achieving the Double. After winning the 2025 Korea Cup final, he was selected as the Most Valuable Player of the tournament.

On 3 January 2026, Park joined Chinese Super League club Zhejiang FC.

== International career ==
Park played as an overage player for the South Korea under-23 team at the 2022 Asian Games, winning a gold medal.

On 21 November 2023, Park made his senior international debut in a FIFA World Cup qualifier against China, which ended in a 3–0 win. Two months later, he played as a substitute for South Korea in four matches of the 2023 AFC Asian Cup. On 26 March 2024, he scored his first international goal in a 3–0 World Cup qualifier win over Thailand.

Park was selected for the national team for the 2026 FIFA World Cup, becoming the only Chinese Super League player to enter the tournament. He played two group stage matches as a substitute.

== Career statistics ==
=== Club ===
As of match played 8 November 2026

Appearances and goals by club, season and competition
Club	Season	League			Cup		Continental		Others		Total	
Club	Season	Division	Apps	Goals	Apps	Goals	Apps	Goals	Apps	Goals	Apps	Goals
Daejeon Korail	2017	Korea National League	25	11	2	1	—		3 (Note: Appearances in Korea National League Championship)	2	30	14
Ansan Greeners	2018	K League 2	26	2	1	0	—		—		27	2
Ansan Greeners	2019	K League 2	36	5	1	0	—		—		37	5
Ansan Greeners	Total		62	7	2	0	—		—		64	7
Daejeon Hana Citizen	2020	K League 2	23	3	3	1	—		1 (Note: Appearances in K League promotion-relegation play-offs)	0	27	4
Daejeon Hana Citizen	2021	K League 2	31	4	1	2	—		4	1	36	7
Daejeon Hana Citizen	Total		54	7	4	3	—		5	1	63	11
Jeonbuk Hyundai Motors	2022	K League 1	33	2	3	0	7 (Note: Appearances in AFC Champions League)	0	—		43	2
Jeonbuk Hyundai Motors	2023	K League 1	32	1	4	1	4	0	—		40	2
Jeonbuk Hyundai Motors	2024	K League 1	27	0	0	0	4	0	2	0	33	0
Jeonbuk Hyundai Motors	2025	K League 1	35	3	6	1	4 (Note: Appearances in AFC Champions League Two)	1	—		45	5
Jeonbuk Hyundai Motors	Total		127	6	13	2	19	1	2	0	161	9
Zhejiang FC	2026	Chinese Super League	27	2	0	0	—		—		27	2
Career total			295	33	21	6	19	1	10	3	345	43

=== International ===
As of match played on 13 November 2026

Appearances and goals by national team and year
National team	Year	Apps	Goals
South Korea	2023	1	0
South Korea	2024	5	1
South Korea	2025	5	0
South Korea	2026	10	0
Total		21	1

Scores and results list South Korea's goal tally first.

List of international goals scored by Park Jin-seob
No.	Date	Venue	Opponent	Score	Result	Competition
1	26 March 2024	Rajamangala Stadium, Bangkok, Thailand	Thailand	3–0	3–0	2026 FIFA World Cup qualification

== Honours ==
Jeonbuk Hyundai Motors

- K League 1: 2025
- Korea Cup: 2022, 2025

South Korea U23

- Asian Games: 2022

South Korea

- EAFF Championship runner-up: 2025

Individual

- K League 2 Best XI: 2021
- K League 1 Best XI: 2022, 2025
- K League All-Star: 2024, 2025
- Korea Cup Most Valuable Player: 2025
