= Park Jong-chan =

South Korean footballer

Personal information
- Date of birth: 2 October 1981 (age 45)
- Place of birth: South Korea
- Height: 1.74 m (5 ft 8 1/2 in)
- Position: Forward

Youth career
- Kangdong High School
- Hannam University

Senior career*
Years	Team	Apps	(Gls)
2005–2006	Incheon United	0	(0)
2007	INGNEX FC	10	(1)
2007–2015	Suwon FC	152	(50)
- * Club domestic league appearances and goals

- Park Jong-chan
- Hangul: 박종찬
- Hanja: 朴鐘燦
- RR: Bak Jongchan
- MR: Pak Chongch'an

Park Jong-chan (Korean: 박종찬; born 2 October 1981) is a retired South Korean footballer who played as midfielder.

== Career ==
He joined Incheon United in 2005, but he didn't make any appearance in 2005 K-League. He was released by Incheon in 2006.

He moved to Suwon FC from INGNEX FC in 2007.
