= Samyeongsan =

Mountain in South Korea

Coordinates: 38°05′N 127°54′E

Highest point
- Elevation: 1,197.6 m (3,929 ft)

Geography
- Location: South Korea

Korean name
- Hangul: 사명산
- Hanja: 四明山
- RR: Samyeongsan
- MR: Samyŏngsan

Samyeongsan (Korean: 사명산) is a mountain between the counties of Yanggu, Hwacheon and Chuncheon, Gangwon Province, South Korea. It has an elevation of 1,197.6 m (3,929 ft).

== See also ==
- List of mountains in Korea
