= 2004 K2 League Championship =

Tournament details
- Country: South Korea
- City: Namhae, Gyeongnam
- Dates: 15–22 June 2004
- Teams: 11

Final positions
- Champions: Hyundai Mipo Dockyard (1st title)
- Runner-up: Suwon City

Tournament statistics
- Top goal scorer(s): Kim Young-gi (4 goals)

Awards
- Best player: Kim Young-gi

The 2004 K2 League Championship was the first competition of the Korea National League Championship. R League club Korean Police was invited to the competition.

== Group stage ==
=== Group A ===
Pos	Team	Pld	W	L	GF	GA	GD	PCT	GKB	GPH
1	Goyang Kookmin Bank	2	1	1	5	1	+4	.500	—	5–0
2	Gimpo Hallelujah	2	1	1	1	5	−4	.500	1–0	—

Source: RSSSF

=== Group B ===
Pos	Team	Pld	W	L	GF	GA	GD	PCT	DHN	SSC	GNC
1	Daejeon KHNP	2	2	0	2	0	+2	1.000	—	0–0 (6–5 p)	2–0
2	Seosan Citizen	2	1	1	0	0	0	.500		—	0–0 (5–3 p)
3	Gangneung City	2	0	2	0	2	−2	.000			—

Source: RSSSF

=== Group C ===
Pos	Team	Pld	W	L	GF	GA	GD	PCT	SWC	KOP	ICH
1	Suwon City	2	2	0	4	3	+1	1.000	—	1–0	3–3 (4–2 p)
2	Korean Police	2	1	1	3	2	+1	.500		—	3–1
3	Icheon Sangmu	2	0	2	4	6	−2	.000			—

Source: RSSSF

=== Group D ===
Pos	Team	Pld	W	L	GF	GA	GD	PCT	HMD	INC	UHK
1	Hyundai Mipo Dockyard	2	2	0	5	1	+4	1.000	—	3–1	2–0
2	Incheon Korail	2	1	1	2	3	−1	.500		—	1–0
3	Uijeongbu Hummel Korea	2	0	2	0	3	−3	.000			—

Source: RSSSF

== Knockout stage ==
=== Bracket ===
Semi-finals
Goyang Kookmin Bank	2
Suwon City	4
Daejeon KHNP	1
Hyundai Mipo Dockyard	3

Final
Suwon City	1
Hyundai Mipo Dockyard	3

=== Semi-finals ===
20 June 2004

Goyang Kookmin Bank	2–4	Suwon City

Namhae Sports Park, Namhae

20 June 2004

Daejeon KHNP	1–3	Hyundai Mipo Dockyard

Namhae Sports Park, Namhae

=== Final ===
22 June 2004

Suwon City	1–3	Hyundai Mipo Dockyard

Namhae Sports Park, Namhae

== See also ==
- 2004 in South Korean football
- 2004 K2 League
