= Lee Kil-yong (footballer, born 1976) =

South Korean footballer

Personal information
- Date of birth: 30 March 1976 (age 50)
- Place of birth: Seoul, South Korea
- Height: 1.83 m (6 ft 0 in)
- Position: Forward

Team information
- Current team: Changwon FC
- Number: 38

Youth career
- 1992–1994: Yongmoon High School
- 1995–1998: Kwangwoon University

Senior career*
Years	Team	Apps	(Gls)
1999–2002	Ulsan Hyundai Horang-i	63	(10)
2003–2004	Pohang Steelers	27	(2)
2004	Bucheon SK	7	(0)
2005	Icheon Hummel Korea	0	(0)
2006–2010	Changwon City	65	(29)
2010	BIT	0	(0)
2011–2014	Changwon City	0	(0)
2015–	Changwon FC	0	(0)
- * Club domestic league appearances and goals as of 22 February 2016

- Lee Kil-yong
- Hangul: 이길용
- Hanja: 李佶勇
- RR: I Gilyong
- MR: I Kiryong

Lee Kil-yong (born 30 March 1976) is a South Korean football player who played at forward for Changwon City at National League in South Korea.

He also played for Ulsan Hyundai Horang-i, Pohang Steelers, Bucheon SK, Icheon Hummel Korea and BIT.
