= Suwon FC =

South Korean professional football club

- Full name: Suwon Football Club 수원시민프로축구단
- Founded: 2003; 23 years ago
- Ground: Suwon Stadium
- Capacity: 11,808
- Owner: Suwon Government
- Chairman: Lee Jae-joon (Mayor of Suwon)
- Manager: Park Kun-ha
- League: K League 2
- 2025: K League 1, 10th of 12 (relegated via play-offs)
- Website: suwonfc.com
Home colours	Away colours	Third colours

Suwon FC (Korean: 수원 FC; Hanja: 水原 FC) is a South Korean professional football club based in Suwon that competes in the K League 2, the second tier of South Korean football. They play their home games at Suwon Stadium.

== History ==
=== Early years: semi-professional ===
Suwon city government decided to create a semi-professional level football club that would link school-level football clubs within the city and Suwon Samsung Bluewings, which is a professional club based in the city. On 15 March 2003, Suwon City Football Club was officially formed. The club appointed Kim Chang-kyum as their manager and joined the semi-professional Korea National League, which was then called the K2 League.

They won their first trophy in 2004 by winning the Korean President's Cup National Football Tournament. Slowly, they rose to be strong contenders in the Korea National League as they reached the play-off on four occasions between 2005 and 2009, although they failed to lift the trophy on all four occasions. Finally, in the 2010 season, they became the league champions after beating Daejeon Korea Hydro & Nuclear Power 2–1 on aggregate in the final. Manager Kim Chang-kyum left the team after the 2011 season as his contract expired and Cho Deok-je, who had been managing the club's youth team, succeeded him.

=== Suwon FC era ===
On 9 December 2012, it was officially announced that the team would become fully professional. The club's name was also changed to Suwon FC and got an approval to join the professional K League. Suwon FC joined the second-tier K League Challenge in the 2013 season. Their debut season as a professional club was successful, as they finished fourth in the league and became the only K League Challenge club to reach the quarter-finals in the FA Cup.

The 2015 season was a milestone for the club. After finishing the regular season in third place, Suwon FC proceeded to the K League Challenge play-offs in which they eliminated Seoul E-Land and Daegu FC. In the promotion-relegation playoffs, Suwon then defeated top division side Busan IPark 3–0 on aggregate and won the promotion to the 2016 K League Classic.

== Players ==
=== Current squad ===
As of 8 October 2026

Note: Flags indicate national team as defined under FIFA eligibility rules; some limited exceptions apply. Players may hold more than one non-FIFA nationality.

No.	Pos.	Nation	Player
1	GK	KOR	Lee Yun-oh
2	DF	KOR	Kim Jeong-wan
3	DF	BRA	Derlan
5	DF	KOR	Lee Hyun-yong
6	DF	KOR	Kim Ji-hoon
7	MF	KOR	Lee Jae-won (vice-captain)
8	MF	KOR	Han Chan-hee (captain)
9	FW	BRA	Matheus Babi
10	MF	BRA	Matheus Frizzo
11	FW	KOR	Kim Jeong-hwan
13	GK	KOR	Jeong Min-ki
14	MF	KOR	Goo Bon-cheul
15	DF	KOR	Hong Joon-ho
16	DF	KOR	Jo Jin-woo
17	DF	KOR	Min Jun-yeong
18	MF	JPN	Koki Tsukagawa
19	FW	KOR	Kim Gyeong-min
20	DF	KOR	Lee Ji-sol
21	GK	KOR	Yang Han-been (vice-captain)
22	MF	KOR	Seo Jae-min

No.	Pos.	Nation	Player
23	FW	KOR	Yeom Do-hyun
24	DF	KOR	Kang Yun-koo
25	DF	KOR	Jang Young-woo
26	FW	KOR	Ahn Jun-kyu
27	DF	KOR	Lee Si-young
29	FW	KOR	Choi Gi-yun
31	GK	KOR	Moon Jung-woo
38	DF	KOR	Baek Seung-hwan
40	MF	KOR	Kim Min-ho
41	GK	KOR	Choi Jun-young
59	DF	KOR	Park Cheol-woo
66	DF	KOR	Jang Yeon-woo
70	FW	KOR	Jung Seung-bae
77	FW	KOR	Baek Kyung
79	MF	KOR	Choi Ryun-seong
88	DF	KOR	Park Jae-hoon
89	MF	KOR	Lee Gwang-hyeok
91	MF	KOR	Kim Do-yoon
99	FW	KOR	Ha Jeong-woo

=== Out on loan ===
Note: Flags indicate national team as defined under FIFA eligibility rules; some limited exceptions apply. Players may hold more than one non-FIFA nationality.

No.	Pos.	Nation	Player
—	GK	KOR	Lee Jae-hun (at Sejong SA)
—	DF	KOR	Han Sang-gyu (at Changwon FC)
—	DF	KOR	Kim Jae-sung (at Seoul Jungnang for military service)
—	MF	KOR	An Chi-woo (at Busan Transportation Corporation)
—	MF	KOR	Roh Kyung-ho (at Gimcheon Sangmu for military service)

No.	Pos.	Nation	Player
—	FW	KOR	Choi Chi-ung (at Yongin FC)
—	FW	KOR	Kang Min-sung (at Yeoju FC)
—	FW	KOR	Park Yong-hee (at Gimcheon Sangmu for military service)
—	FW	BRA	Willyan (at Cheonan City)
—	FW	KOR	Yang Woo-jin (at Busan Transportation Corporation)

== Backroom staff ==
=== Coaching staff ===
- Manager: (South Korea) Park Kun-ha
- Head coach: (South Korea) Kim Tae-min
- Coaches: (South Korea) Lee Sang-don, (South Korea) Yang Dong-hyen
- Goalkeeping coach: (South Korea) Kim Ho-jun
- Fitness coach: (South Korea) Lee Geo-seong

=== Support staff ===
- Team doctor: (South Korea) Jung Tae-seok
- Medical staff: (South Korea) Kim Jeong-won, (South Korea) Hwang Geon-ha, (South Korea) Im Jae-young, (South Korea) Choi Jung-ho
- Scout: (South Korea) Kim Young-geun
- Analyst: (South Korea) Chae Bong-joo
- Interpreter: (South Korea) Park Hyung-man
- Kit managers: (South Korea) Jang Jae-ho, (South Korea) Won Young-seung

Source: Official website

== Managers ==
No.	Name	From	To	Season(s)
1	(South Korea) Kim Chang-kyum	2003/03/15	2011/11/14	2003–2011
2	(South Korea) Cho Deok-je	2011/11/15	2017/08/26	2012–2017
C	(South Korea) Cho Jong-hwa	2017/08/26	2017/10/12	2017
3	(South Korea) Kim Dae-eui	2017/10/12	2019/10/29	2017–2019
C	(South Korea) Lee Kwan-woo	2019/10/30	2019/11/13	2019
4	(South Korea) Kim Do-kyun	2019/11/14	2023/12/12	2020–2023
5	(South Korea) Kim Eun-jung	2023/12/20	2025/12/24	2024–2025
6	(South Korea) Park Kun-ha	2025/12/24	present	2026–

== Honours ==
=== League ===
- K League 2
  - Runners-up (3): 2015, 2020, 2026
- National League
  - Winners (1): 2010
  - Runners-up (3): 2005, 2007, 2008

=== Cup ===
- National League Championship
  - Winners (3): 2005, 2007, 2012
  - Runners-up (1): 2004
- National Sports Festival
  - Runners-up (3): 2006, 2007, 2011
- Gyeonggido Sports Festival
  - Winners (8): 2003, 2004, 2005, 2006, 2007, 2008, 2011, 2012
  - Runners-up (1): 2010
- President's Cup
  - Winners (2): 2004, 2007

== Season-by-season record ==
Season	Division	Teams	P	W	D	L	GF	GA	GD	Pts	Position	Korean FA Cup	Top scorer (league goals)	Manager
2013	2	8	35	13	8	14	53	51	+2	47	4th	Quarter-final	(South Korea) Park Jong-chan (11)	(South Korea) Cho Deok-je
2014	2	10	36	12	12	12	52	49	+3	48	6th	Round of 16	(South Korea) Jung Min-woo (8) (South Korea) Kim Han-won (8)	(South Korea) Cho Deok-je
2015	2	11	40	18	11	11	64	54	+10	65	3rd ▲	Third round	(Brazil) Japa (19)	(South Korea) Cho Deok-je
2016	1	12	38	10	9	19	40	58	–18	39	12th ▼	Round of 32	(South Korea) Lee Seung-hyun (6)	(South Korea) Cho Deok-je
2017	2	10	36	11	12	13	42	48	–6	45	6th	Third round	(South Korea) Baek Sung-dong (8)	(South Korea) Cho Deok-je (South Korea) Cho Jong-hwa (C) (South Korea) Kim Dae-eui
2018	2	10	36	13	3	20	29	46	–17	42	7th	Round of 32	(Brazil) Fernando Viana (6)	(South Korea) Kim Dae-eui
2019	2	10	36	11	10	15	49	55	–6	43	8th	Round of 32	(Nigeria) Chisom Egbuchulam (18)	(South Korea) Kim Dae-eui (South Korea) Lee Kwan-woo (C)
2020	2	10	27	17	3	7	52	28	+24	54	2nd ▲	Round of 16	(North Korea) An Byong-jun (20)	(South Korea) Kim Do-kyun
2021	1	12	38	14	9	15	53	57	–4	51	5th	Third round	(South Africa) Lars Veldwijk (18)	(South Korea) Kim Do-kyun
2022	1	12	38	13	9	16	56	63	–7	48	7th	Third round	(South Korea) Lee Seung-woo (14)	(South Korea) Kim Do-kyun
2023	1	12	38	8	9	21	44	76	–32	33	11th	Third round	(South Korea) Lee Seung-woo (10)	(South Korea) Kim Do-kyun
2024	1	12	38	15	8	15	54	57	–3	53	5th	Third round	(South Korea) Jeong Seung-won (11)	(South Korea) Kim Eun-jung
2025	1	12	38	11	9	18	51	58	–7	42	10th ▼	Round of 16	(Syria) Pablo Sabbag (17)	(South Korea) Kim Eun-jung

== See also ==
- List of football clubs in South Korea
- Suwon FC Women
