= Hongcheon Idu FC =

2004–2009 South Korean football club

Hongcheon Idu FC 홍천 이두 FC
- Full name: Hongcheon Idu Football Club 홍천 이두 축구단
- Founded: 2004
- Dissolved: 2009
- Ground: Hongcheon Public Stadium
- Chairman: (South Korea) Park Jong-soon
- Manager: (South Korea) Kim Young-ho
- League: (South Korea) National League
- 2009 Season: 14th
Home colours	Away colours

Hongcheon Idu Football Club (Korean: 홍천 이두 FC) is a South Korean football club that is currently a member of the National League.

The team started out life as INGNEX FC, and applied for league membership in 2006 but its application was rejected, however it was successful the second time around and was admitted to the 2007 National League. The team initially planned to play their home games in Yeosu, but a disagreement with the Yeosu city government left them homeless for the entire season.

After failing to register in time for the 2008 season, INGNEX FC was sold to Idu Construction. They relocated the team to Hongcheon and paid the necessary registration fees to compete in the 2008 season under the new name of Hongcheon Idu FC.

== Name History ==
- 2004: Founded as INGNEX FC
- 2007: Renamed Yeosu INGNEX FC
- 2008: Renamed Hongcheon Idu FC

== Current team squad ==
as of April 5, 2009 Note: Flags indicate national team as defined under FIFA eligibility rules; some limited exceptions apply. Players may hold more than one non-FIFA nationality.

No.	Pos.	Nation	Player
1	GK	KOR	Park Seong-min
2	MF	KOR	Kim Sun-ho
3	DF	KOR	Ha Chi-ho
4	DF	KOR	Jeong Seok-hoon
5	MF	KOR	Lee Dae-ryun
6	DF	KOR	Park Byeong-hoon
8	MF	KOR	Won You-cheol
9	MF	KOR	Choe Moon-hyeong
10	MF	KOR	Heo Geon
11	DF	KOR	Oh Dong-uk
12	MF	KOR	Gwon Oh-jin

No.	Pos.	Nation	Player
14	FW	KOR	Park Seong-beom
16	FW	KOR	Choi Yong-seon
18	FW	KOR	An Seong-hwan
20	MF	KOR	Park Chi-un
21	GK	KOR	Yu Jae-woo
22	MF	KOR	Park Hong-jeong
23	MF	KOR	Lee Hoon
27	FW	KOR	Park Gyung-gwon
29	MF	KOR	Kim Gyeong-cheol
44	DF	KOR	Jeong Hwa-yong
77	FW	KOR	Yoo Wook-jin

== Statistics ==
Season	Korea National League											Korean FA Cup	League Cup	Top scorer (League goals)	Manager
Season	Stage	Teams	P	W	D	L	GF	GA	GD	Pts	Position	Korean FA Cup	League Cup	Top scorer (League goals)	Manager
2006	Did not participated											Preliminary round	Group round		
2007	First stage	12	11	2	1	8	11	28	–17	7	12th	Did not qualify	Group Round	(South Korea) Kim Gwang-seon (4)	
2007	Second stage	12	11	1	2	8	12	27	–15	5	12th	Did not qualify	Group Round	(South Korea) Kim Gwang-seon (4)	
2008	First stage	14	13	0	4	9	15	34	–19	4	14th	Round 1	Quarterfinal	(South Korea) Park Dong-il (13)	
2008	Second stage	14	13	2	0	11	20	51	–31	6	13th	Round 1	Quarterfinal	(South Korea) Park Dong-il (13)	
2009	First stage	14	13	1	2	10	11	36	–25	5	14th	Round 1	Group Round	(South Korea) Choi Yong-seon (4)	
2009	Second stage	Banned due to financial problem										Round 1	Group Round	(South Korea) Choi Yong-seon (4)	

== See also ==
- List of football clubs in South Korea
