= Ulsan Hyundai Mipo Dockyard FC =

1998–2016 South Korean football club

Hyundai Mipo Dockyard FC
- Full name: Ulsan Hyundai Mipo Dockyard; Dolphin Football Club 울산 현대미포조선 돌고래 축구단
- Founded: 1998; 28 years ago
- Dissolved: 2016; 10 years ago
- Ground: Ulsan Stadium
- Capacity: 19,471
- Owner: Hyundai Mipo Dockyard
Home colours	Away colours

Ulsan Hyundai Mipo Dockyard Dolphin Football Club (Korean: 울산 현대미포조선 돌고래 축구단) was a South Korean football club based in Ulsan. The club competed in the Korea National League between 2003 and 2016 and was owned and operated by Hyundai Mipo Dockyard. They played their home games at the 19,471-capacity Ulsan Stadium.

== History ==
The club was founded in 1998 as the works team of Hyundai Mipo Dockyard, a global shipbuilding company, and joined the Korea National League in 2003. They won the National League seven times (2007, 2008, 2011, 2013, 2014, 2015 and 2016). After the 2016 season, Hyundai Mipo Dockyard announced that they would no longer fund the team, and the club was subsequently dissolved.

== Honours ==
- Korea National League
  - Winners (7): 2007, 2008, 2011, 2013, 2014, 2015, 2016
- Korean FA Cup
  - Runners-up (1): 2005
- Korea National League Championship
  - Winners (3): 2004, 2011, 2016
  - Runners-up (4): 2006, 2010, 2012, 2015
- Korean National Football Championship
  - Winners (1): 2000
- Korean President's Cup
  - Winners (2): 2005, 2008

== Season-by-season records ==
Season	Korea National League											Korean FA Cup	League Cup	Top scorer (league goals)	Manager
Season	Stage	Teams	P	W	D	L	GF	GA	GD	Pts	Position	Korean FA Cup	League Cup	Top scorer (league goals)	Manager
1999	No competition											Round of 16	N/A	No competition	Cho Dong-hyun
2000	No competition											Round of 16	N/A	No competition	Cho Dong-hyun
2001	No competition											Second round	N/A	No competition	Cho Dong-hyun
2002	No competition											Round of 16	N/A	No competition	Cho Dong-hyun
2003	First stage	10	9	5	2	2	13	7	+6	17	2nd	Round of 16	N/A	Kim Joon-hyup (6)	Cho Dong-hyun
2003	Second stage	10	9	3	4	2	11	5	+6	13	4th	Round of 16	N/A	Kim Joon-hyup (6)	Cho Dong-hyun
2004	First stage	10	9	6	3	0	19	7	+12	21	2nd	First round	Winners	Yang Ji-hoon (7)	Cho Dong-hyun
2004	Second stage	10	9	5	4	0	19	7	+12	19	2nd	First round	Winners	Yang Ji-hoon (7)	Cho Dong-hyun
2005	First stage	11	10	6	3	1	25	15	+10	21	2nd	Runners-up	Semi-final	Kim Young-ki (10)	Cho Dong-hyun
2005	Second stage	11	10	3	3	4	13	14	−1	12	8th	Runners-up	Semi-final	Kim Young-ki (10)	Cho Dong-hyun
2006	First stage	11	10	6	1	3	23	17	+6	19	4th	Round of 16	Runners-up	Kim Young-hoo (19)	Choi Soon-ho
2006	Second stage	11	10	7	1	2	25	13	+12	22	2nd	Round of 16	Runners-up	Kim Young-hoo (19)	Choi Soon-ho
2007	First stage	12	11	8	1	2	20	7	+13	25	1st	Quarter-final	Quarter-final	Kim Young-hoo (9)	Choi Soon-ho
2007	Second stage	12	11	6	4	1	20	11	+9	22	2nd	Quarter-final	Quarter-final	Kim Young-hoo (9)	Choi Soon-ho
2007	Playoff	2	2	2	0	0	7	1	+6	6	Champions	Quarter-final	Quarter-final	Kim Young-hoo (9)	Choi Soon-ho
2008	First stage	14	13	11	2	0	29	8	+21	35	1st	Round of 16	Group round	Kim Young-hoo (31)	Choi Soon-ho
2008	Second stage	14	13	7	3	3	40	25	+15	24	4th	Round of 16	Group round	Kim Young-hoo (31)	Choi Soon-ho
2008	Playoff	4	3	1	2	0	5	2	+3	5	Champions	Round of 16	Group round	Kim Young-hoo (31)	Choi Soon-ho
2009	First stage	14	13	4	3	6	18	17	+1	15	9th	Round of 32	Quarter-final	Choi Chul-woo (7)	Cho Min-kuk
2009	Second stage	13	12	6	3	3	21	14	+7	21	4th	Round of 32	Quarter-final	Choi Chul-woo (7)	Cho Min-kuk
2010	First stage	15	14	5	5	4	18	14	+4	20	9th	Round of 32	Runners-up	Alex (9)	Cho Min-kuk
2010	Second stage	15	14	7	3	4	22	10	+12	24	6th	Round of 32	Runners-up	Alex (9)	Cho Min-kuk
2011	—	14	26	17	2	7	53	34	+19	53	1st	Round of 32	Winners	Danilo (10)	Cho Min-kuk
2011	Playoff	6	2	1	1	0	2	1	+1	4	Champions	Round of 32	Winners	Danilo (10)	Cho Min-kuk
2012	—	14	26	15	4	7	61	30	+31	49	2nd	Round of 32	Runners-up	Lee Jae-min (12)	Cho Min-kuk
2012	Playoff	6	1	0	0	1	1	2	−1	0	3rd	Round of 32	Runners-up	Lee Jae-min (12)	Cho Min-kuk

== See also ==
- Ulsan Hyundai FC
- List of football clubs in South Korea
