= FC Mokpo =

- Full name: Football Club Mokpo 목포 축구단
- Founded: 24 December 2009; 16 years ago, as Mokpo City FC
- Ground: Mokpo International Football Center
- Capacity: 5,952
- Chairman: Jung Jong-Deuk (Mayor)
- Coach: Cho Deok-je
- League: K3 League
- 2025: K3 League, 15th of 15
- Website: https://mifc.co.kr/bbs/content.php?co_id=7_1
Home colours	Away colours

Football Club Mokpo (Korean: FC 목포) is a South Korean association football club based in Mokpo, South Jeolla. Since the 2010 season, Mokpo have played in the K3 League, the third tier of Korean football.

== Honours ==
=== Domestic competitions ===
==== Cups ====
- National Sports Festival

(bronze) Bronze Medal (1): 2011

== Current squad ==
As of 2 March 2024

Note: Flags indicate national team as defined under FIFA eligibility rules; some limited exceptions apply. Players may hold more than one non-FIFA nationality.

No.	Pos.	Nation	Player
1	GK	KOR	Kim Chan-yong
2	DF	KOR	Lim Tae-seong
3	DF	KOR	Kim Tae-woo
4	DF	KOR	Sim Won-seong
5	FW	KOR	Choi Chi-ung
6	MF	KOR	Lim Dae-joon
7	MF	KOR	Park Sun-yong
8	MF	KOR	Choi Oh-back
9	FW	KOR	Sung Bong-jae
10	DF	KOR	Kim Da-won
12	FW	KOR	Min Sung-yeon
13	MF	KOR	Wan Cho
14	MF	KOR	Chang-woo Han
15	DF	KOR	Hong Seung-hyeon
16	GK	KOR	Kim Jun-seong
17	DF	KOR	Kim Min-hyeok

No.	Pos.	Nation	Player
18	GK	KOR	Ki-mok Im
19	FW	KOR	Park Ju-hyuk
20	FW	KOR	Yang Kyung-mo
21	MF	KOR	Hwang Byung-kwon
22	DF	KOR	Kim Hee-su
23	MF	KOR	Park Ha-bean
24	FW	KOR	Kim Yu-seong
25	FW	KOR	Seon-ung Seo
26	MF	KOR	Seung-woo Seo
27	MF	KOR	Lee Sang-woon
28	FW	KOR	Lee Hyun-jun
29	FW	KOR	Jang Jae-woong
30	MF	KOR	Kim Jeong-hyeon
33	FW	KOR	Choi Seong-woo
66	MF	KOR	Kim Do-yoon
72	FW	IDN	Ilham Kim Soetopo
77	FW	KOR	Ju Young-jae (on loan from Gwangju FC)

== Statistics ==
Season	Korea National League / K3 League											Korean FA Cup	League Cup	Top scorer (League goals)	Manager
Season	Stage	Teams	P	W	D	L	GF	GA	GD	Pts	Position	Korean FA Cup	League Cup	Top scorer (League goals)	Manager
2010	First Stage	15	14	1	5	8	8	20	–12	8	15th	Round of 32	Group Round	(South Korea) Jang Tae-San (5)	(South Korea) Kim Jung-Hyuk
2010	Second Stage	15	14	3	3	8	13	18	–5	12	12th	Round of 32	Group Round	(South Korea) Jang Tae-San (5)	(South Korea) Kim Jung-Hyuk
2011	Group Stage	14	26	5	6	15	25	36	–11	21	13th	Round of 32	Quarterfinal	(South Korea) Kwon Soon-Hak (7)	(South Korea) Kim Jung-Hyuk
2012	Group Stage	14	26	10	6	10	28	37	–9	36	8th	Round of 32	Group Round	(South Korea) Han Jae-Man (South Korea) Ahn Jong-Hoon (South Korea) Kim Hyun-Yong (5)	(South Korea) Kim Jung-Hyuk
2013	Group Stage	10	27	10	6	11	34	36	–2	36	6th	Round of 32	Semifinal	(South Korea) Cho Beom-Seok (South Korea) Choi Su-Bin (South Korea) Lee Je-Kyu (6)	(South Korea) Kim Jung-Hyuk
2014	Group Stage	10	27	8	8	11	28	39	–11	32	8th	Second Round	Semifinals	(South Korea) Han Jae-Man (7)	(South Korea) Kim Jung-Hyuk
2015	Group Stage	10	27	12	8	7	30	21	+9	44	4th	Third Round	Group Round	(South Korea) Kwon Hyuk-Jin (7)	(South Korea) Kim Jung-Hyuk
2016	Group Stage	10	27	6	9	12	20	26	-6	27	9th	Third Round	Semifinal		
2017	Group Stage	8	28	8	11	9	35	35	+0	35	5th	Semifinal	Group Round		
2018	Group Stage	8	28	7	10	11	36	42	-6	31	5th	Quarterfinal	Group Round		
2019	Group Stage	8	28	7	8	13	26	35	-9	29	6th	Round of 32	Group Round		
2020	Regular Season	16	22	10	3	9	39	30	+9	33	5th	Second Round	None		(South Korea) Jung Hyun Ho
2021	Regular Season	16	0	0	0	0	0	0	+0	0	th	Third Round	None		(South Korea) Jung Hyun Ho
