= Gimhae Stadium =

Stadium in Gimhae, South Korea

Coordinates: 35.255569°N 128.876380°E

Gimhae Stadium is a multi-purpose stadium in Gimhae, South Korea. It is currently used mostly for football matches. The stadium has a capacity of 25,000 people and was opened in 2005.
