= Mokpo International Football Center =

Football stadium in Mokpo, South Korea

Coordinates: 34.828988°N 126.399631°E

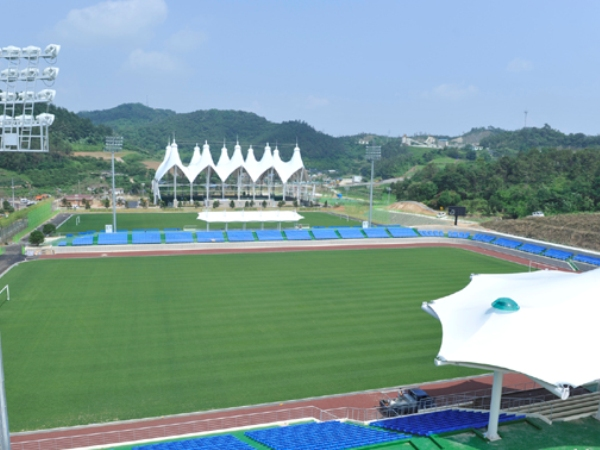
- Mokpo Stadium
- Interactive map of Mokpo International Football Center
- Full name: Mokpo International Football Center
- Location: Mokpo, Jeonnam, South Korea
- Capacity: 5,952
- Surface: Grass & artificial turf

Construction
- Groundbreaking: January 17, 2007
- Opened: August 10, 2009

Tenant
- Mokpo City FC (2010~present)

- Mokpo International Football Center
- Hangul: 목포국제축구센터
- Hanja: 木浦國際蹴球센터
- RR: Mokpo gukje chukgu senteo
- MR: Mokp'o kukche ch'ukku sent'ŏ

The Mokpo International Football Center (Korean: 목포국제축구센터) is a football-specific stadium and training ground in Mokpo, South Korea and was built in 2009. It has six football pitch. Two are nature grounds, three are artificial turf grounds and one ground for youth.
