= Gyeongju Civic Stadium =

Stadium in Gyeongju, South Korea

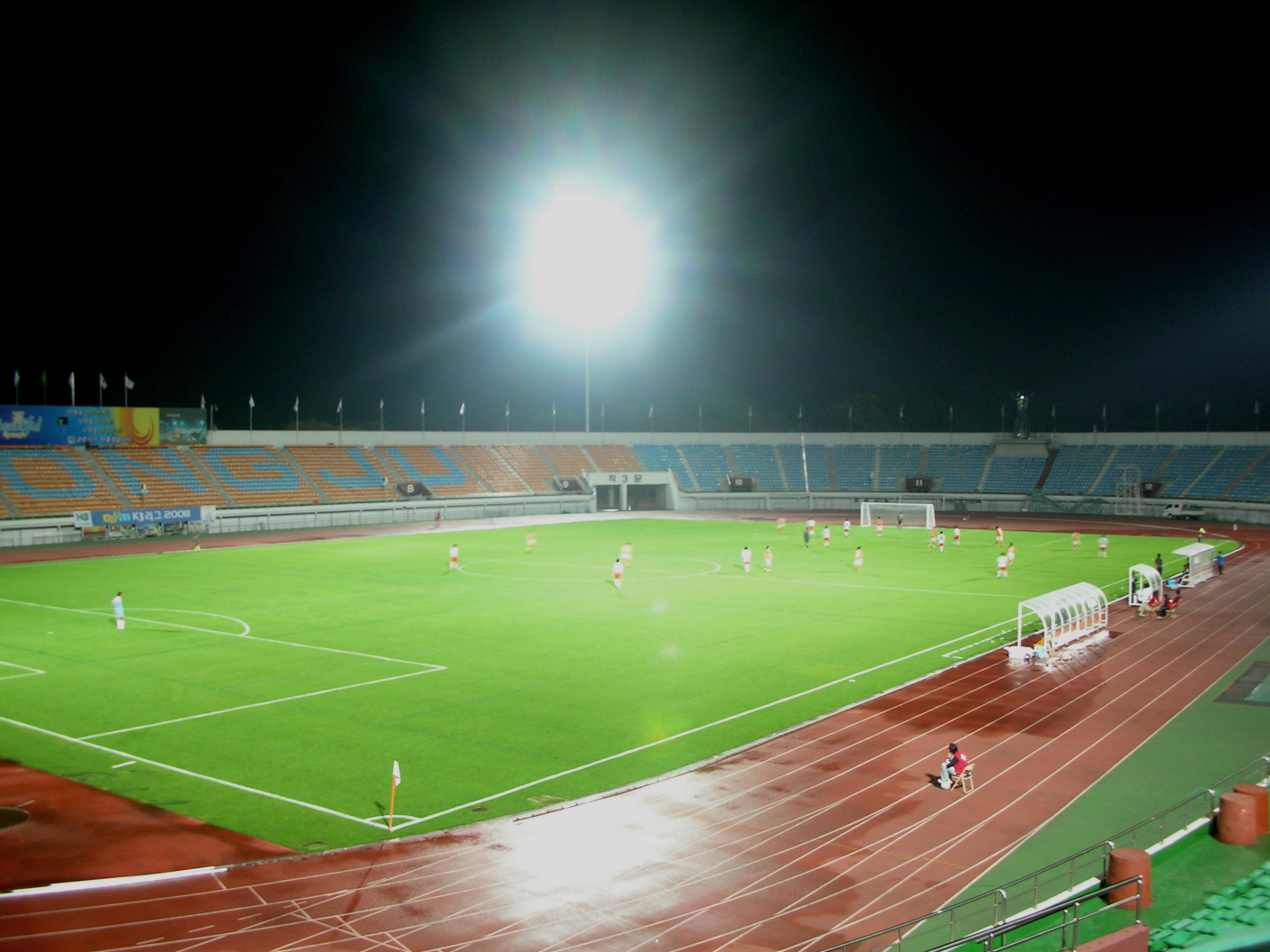
- Interactive map of Gyeongju Civic Stadium
- Location: Gyeongju, South Korea
- Coordinates: 35.859947°N 129.212235°E
- Owner: Gyeongju City Hall
- Operator: Gyeongju City Facilities Management Corporation
- Capacity: 12,199
- Surface: Grass

Construction
- Opened: 20 October 1979

Tenants
- Gyeongju Citizen FC (2008–2020); Gyeongju KHNP (2013–present)

Gyeongju Civic Stadium (Korean: 경주시민운동장) is a multi-use stadium in Gyeongju, South Korea. It is used mostly for football matches.

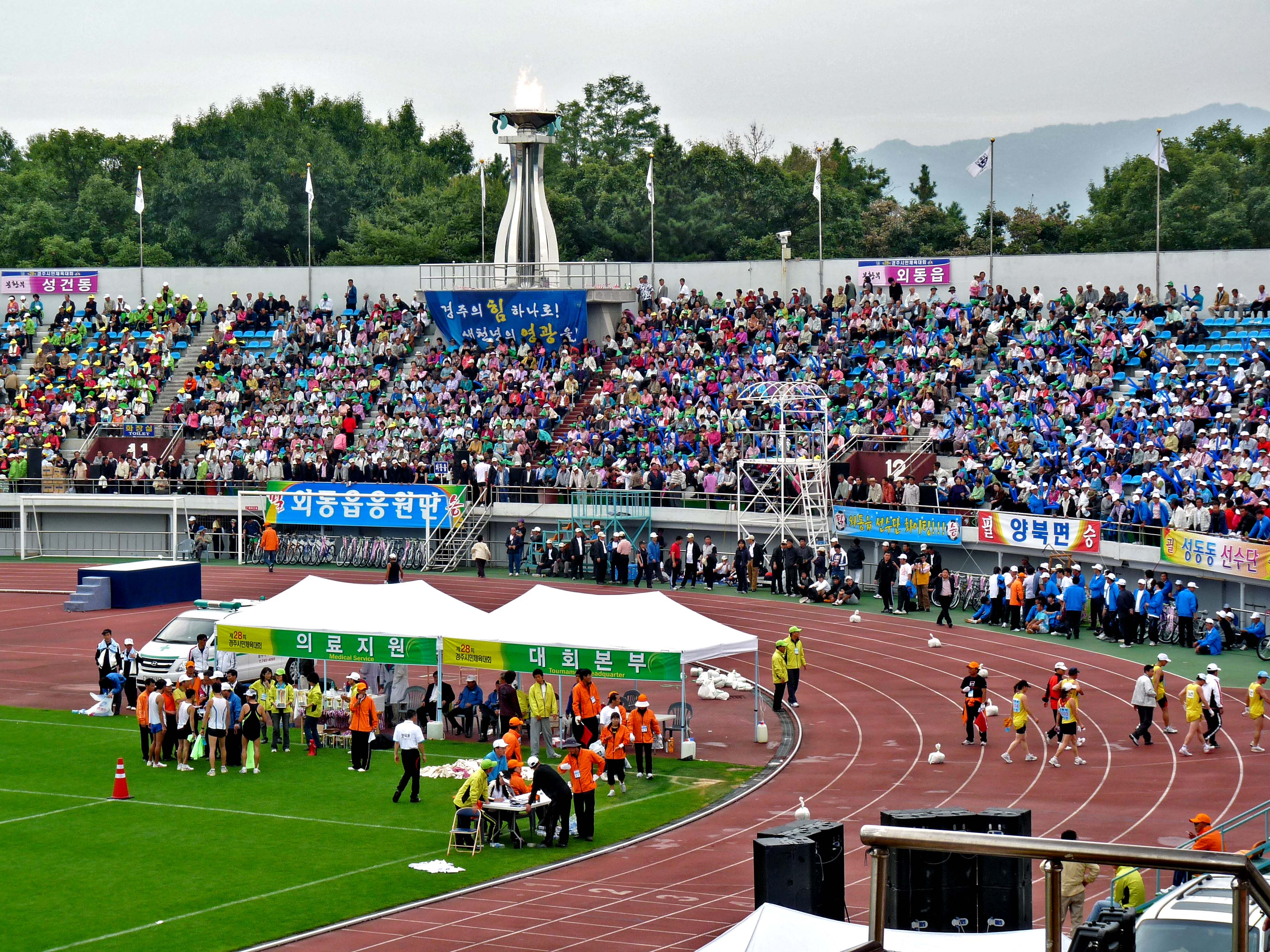
The stadium during the Gyeongju Citizens' Athletics Festival in 2008
