= Korea National League Championship =

2004–2019 South Korean football league

National League Championship
- Organiser(s): Korea National League
- Founded: 2004
- Abolished: 2019
- Region: South Korea
- Most championships: Suwon City; Hyundai Mipo Dockyard; Daejeon Korail; Gyeongju KHNP (3 titles each)

Korea National League Championship (Korean: 내셔널축구선수권대회) was a football league cup competition operated by the Korea National League.

== Results ==
=== Finals ===
Year	Champions	Score	Runners-up
2004	Hyundai Mipo Dockyard	3–1	Suwon City
2005	Suwon City	2–1	Korean Police
2006	Changwon City	2–1	Hyundai Mipo Dockyard
2007	Suwon City	1–0	Goyang KB Kookmin Bank
2008	Daejeon KHNP	3–3 (a.e.t.) (3–0 p)	Ansan Hallelujah
2009	Goyang KB Kookmin Bank	3–1	Daejeon KHNP
2010	Busan Transportation Corporation	2–1	Hyundai Mipo Dockyard
2011	Hyundai Mipo Dockyard	3–0	Changwon City
2012	Suwon City	2–0	Hyundai Mipo Dockyard
2013	Incheon Korail	5–0	Cheonan City
2014	Gyeongju KHNP	2–1	Gangneung City
2015	Daejeon Korail	2–1	Hyundai Mipo Dockyard
2016	Hyundai Mipo Dockyard	1–0	Daejeon Korail
2017	Changwon City	2–2 (a.e.t.) (4–3 p)	Cheonan City
2018	Daejeon Korail	2–1	Gyeongju KHNP
2019	Gyeongju KHNP	2–0	Gangneung City

=== Titles by club ===
Club	Champions	Runners-up
Hyundai Mipo Dockyard	3 (2004, 2011, 2016)	4 (2006, 2010, 2012, 2015)
Gyeongju KHNP	3 (2008, 2014, 2019)	2 (2009, 2018)
Suwon City	3 (2005, 2007, 2012)	1 (2004)
Daejeon Korail	3 (2013, 2015, 2018)	1 (2016)
Changwon City	2 (2006, 2017)	1 (2011)
Goyang KB Kookmin Bank	1 (2009)	1 (2007)
Busan Transportation Corporation	1 (2010)	—
Cheonan City	—	2 (2013, 2017)
Gangneung City	—	2 (2014, 2019)
Korean Police	—	1 (2005)
Ansan H FC	—	1 (2008)

== See also ==
- Korea National League
- National Semi-professional Football Championship (South Korea)
- Korean League Cup
