= Changwon Football Center =

Association football stadium in Gyeongsangnam-do, South Korea

Changwon Football Centre Stadium
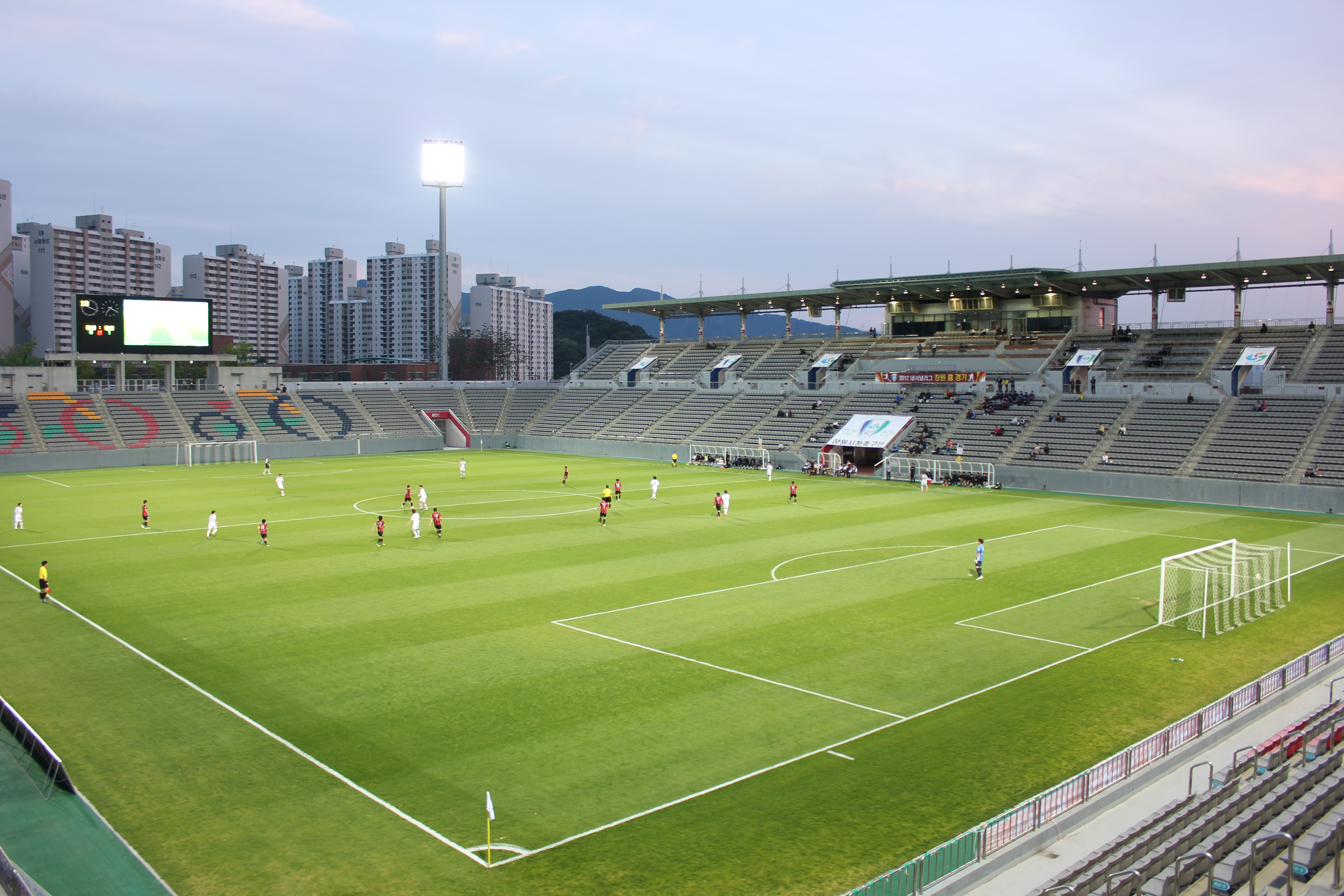
- Changwon Football Centre in 2012
- Interactive map of Changwon Football Centre Stadium
- Location: 305, Dudae-dong, Changwon, Gyeongsangnam-do, South Korea
- Coordinates: 35.223394°N 128.705711°E
- Owner: Changwon
- Operator: Changwon City Facilities Management Corporation
- Capacity: 15,071
- Field size: 105 by 68 metres (115 by 74 yards)

Construction
- Groundbreaking: 27 March 2007
- Opened: 1 December 2009
- Cost: 1,168 billion KRW

Tenants
- Gyeongnam FC (2010–present); Changwon FC (2010–present)

The Changwon Football Centre Stadium (Korean: 창원축구센터) is a football-specific stadium and training ground in Changwon, South Korea. Built in 2009, it is currently used mostly for football matches. The stadium holds 15,071 spectators.

Currently, it is the home ground of the K League 2 side Gyeongnam FC and the K3 League side Changwon FC.

== Gallery ==
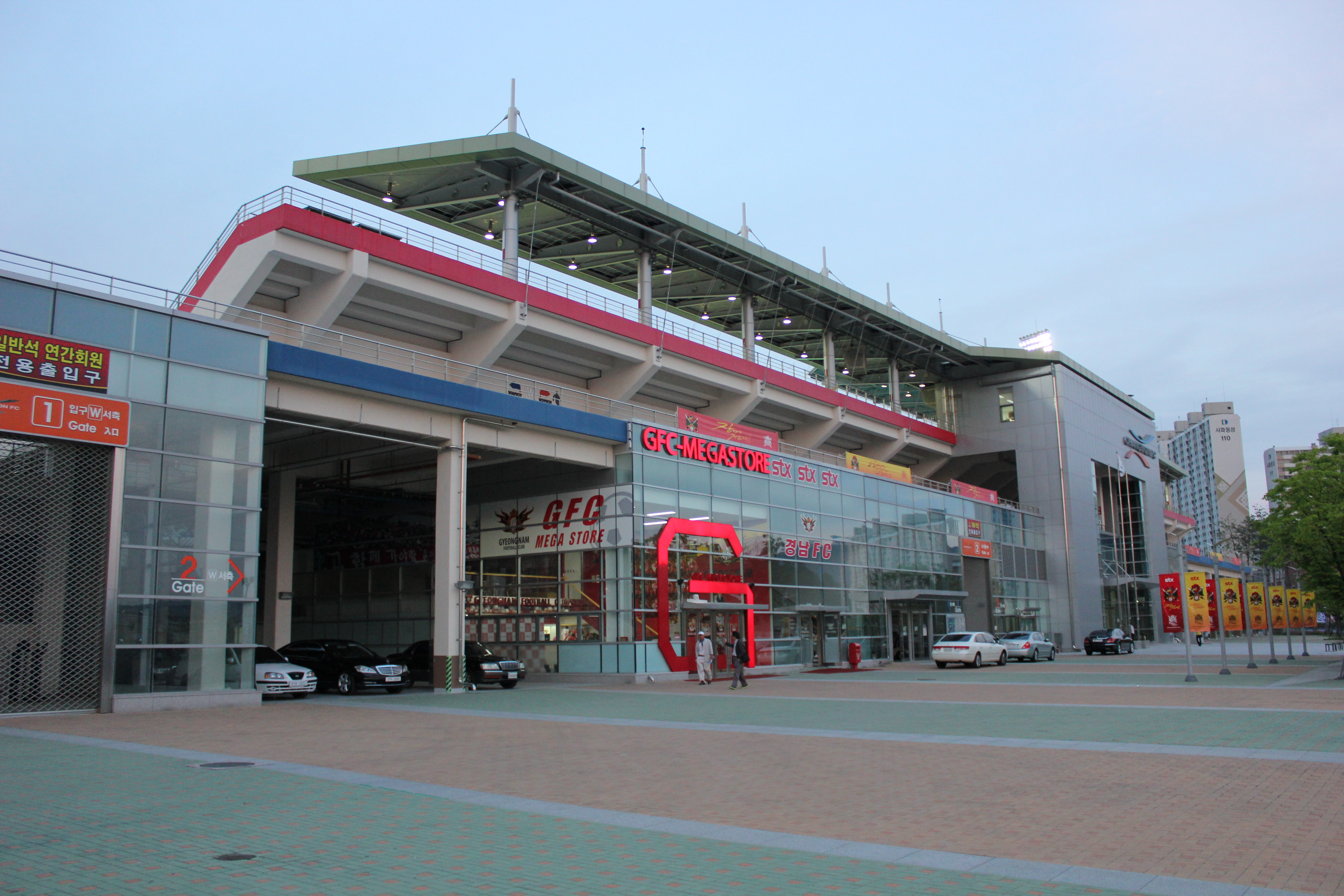

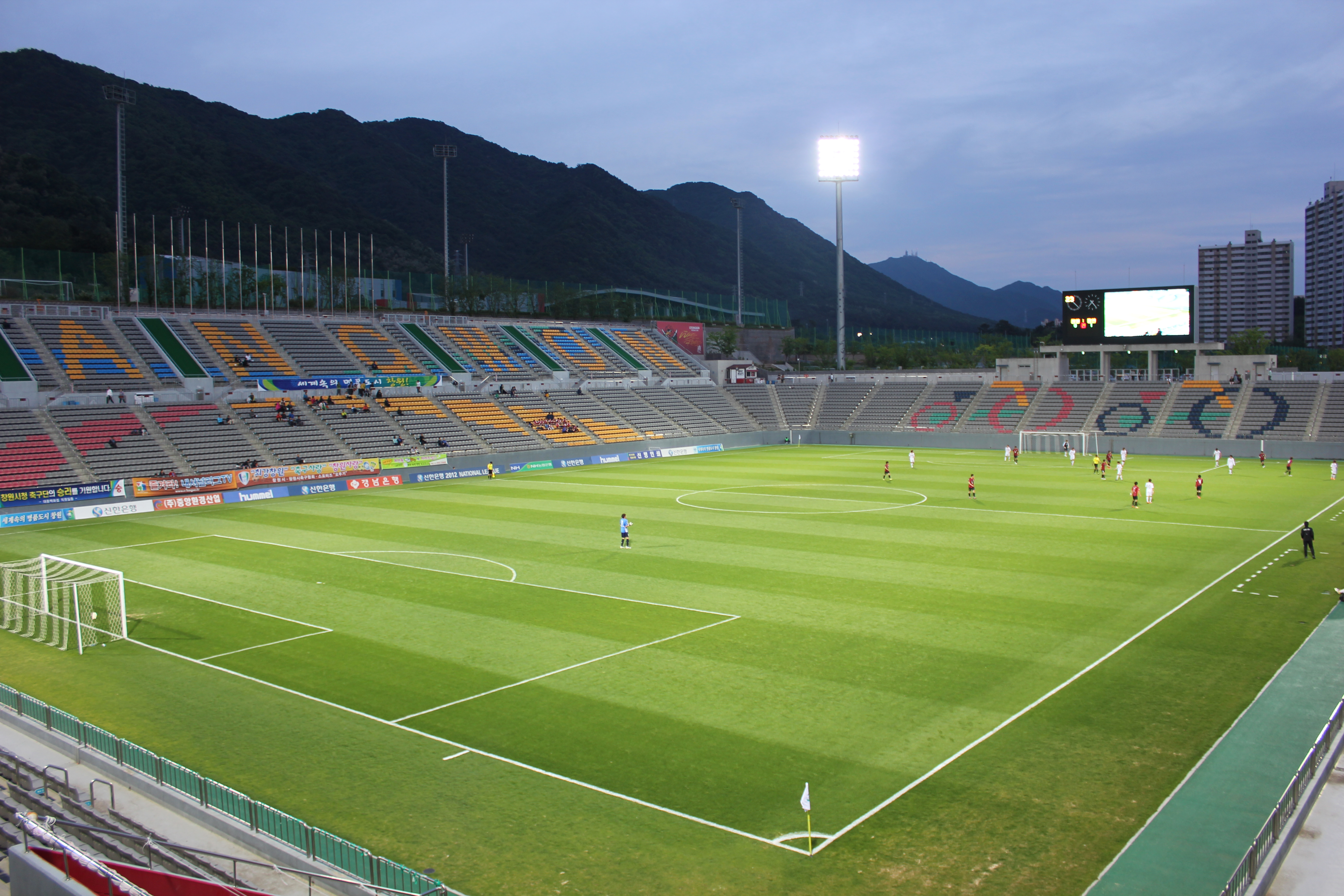

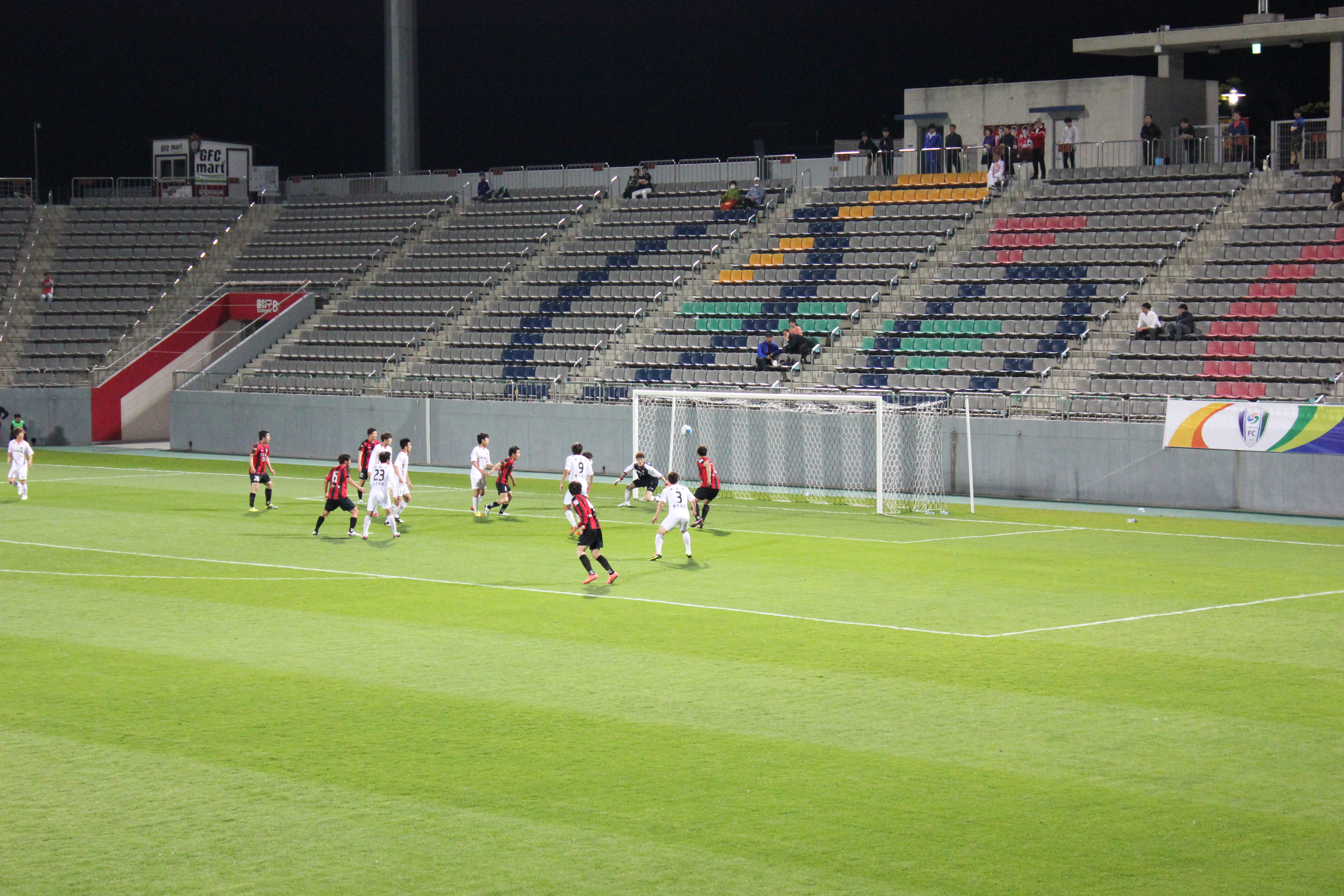

== See also ==
- Changwon Sports Park
