= Yanggu County, Gangwon =

Coordinates: 38°06′29″N 127°59′22″E

Yanggu
- County
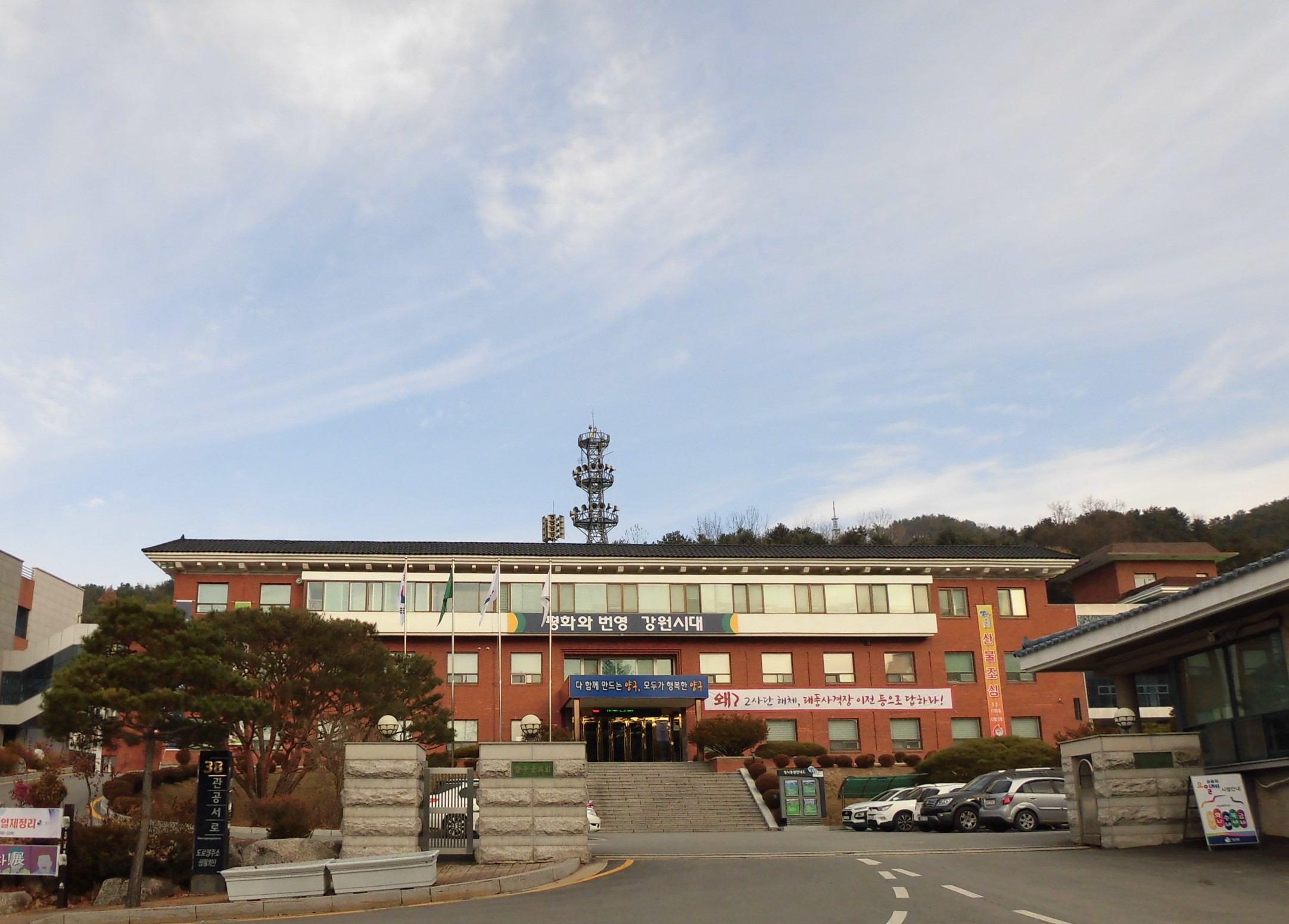
- Yanggu County Office

- Flag Emblem of Yanggu

- Location in South Korea
- Country: South Korea
- State: Gangwon
- Administrative divisions: 1 eup, 4 myeon

Area
  - Total: 700.8 km^{2} (270.6 sq mi)

Population (September 2024)
  - Total: 24,027
  - Density: 34/km^{2} (88/sq mi)

Korean name
- Hangul: 양구군
- Hanja: 楊口郡
- RR: Yanggu-gun
- MR: Yanggu-gun

Yanggu County (Korean: 양구군) is a county in the state of Gangwon, South Korea.

The northern part of Yanggu County was part of the front line for much of the Korean War, and now borders the Demilitarized Zone. Several Korean War battle sites are located in Yanggu County, including Bloody Ridge, Heartbreak Ridge, and Hill 1179 (Daeusan). Yanggu is located in what is claimed to be the geographic center of the Korean Peninsula. Dochon-ri village in Nam-myeon in Yanggu is called the "navel of Korea".

== History ==
Yanggu County was the location of the Battle of Bloody Ridge and the month-long Battle of Heartbreak Ridge during the Korean War. Due to its proximity to the Demilitarized Zone following the Korean ceasefire, the area was closed to civilians for several years which led to nature reclaiming the area around the battlefield. The battlefield was later opened to become a memorial and nature trail which goes around all of the memorials erected to soldiers that had died during those battles within the Yanggu County area.

== Economy ==
Since 2005, Yanggu County has become a main area for apple orchards. This increase was attributed to climate change causing orchards in lower South Korean provinces to become more susceptible to soil degradation, more active fruit moths and scale insects, and anthracnose infecting apple trees. It led to a number of farmers migrating north towards Yanggu due to the climate being more suitable for growing apples.

== Twin towns – sister cities ==
Yanggu is twinned with:

- Chizu, Japan
- Jianli, China
- Saint-Mandé, France
