= Changwon City FC =

South Korean football club

Changwon FC
- Full name: Changwon Football Club
- Founded: 2005; 21 years ago
- Ground: Changwon Football Center
- Capacity: 15,071
- Chairman: Hong Nam-pyo
- Manager: Choi Kyeong-don
- League: K3 League
- 2025: K3 League, 7th of 15
Home colours	Away colours

Changwon FC (Korean: 창원 FC) is a South Korean football club based in the city of Changwon. The team plays in the K3 League, the third tier of South Korean football league system. They were champions of the K3 League in 2022.

The team was previously known as Changwon City FC, until its incorporation as Changwon FC in 2023.

== Honours ==
- Korea National League (regular season)
  - Winners (1): 2009 (second stage)
  - Runners-up (2): 2006 (first stage), 2015
- K3 League
  - Winners (1): 2022
- National League Championship
  - Winners (2): 2006, 2017
  - Runners-up (1): 2011

== Season-by-season records ==
Season	Korea National League / K3 League											Korea Cup	League Cup	Top scorer (league goals)
Season	Stage	Teams	P	W	D	L	GF	GA	GD	Pts	Position	Korea Cup	League Cup	Top scorer (league goals)
2005	First stage	11	10	2	3	5	7	13	−6	9	9th	First round	Group round	(South Korea) Sung Han-soo (6)
2005	Second stage	11	10	4	3	3	16	15	+1	15	5th	First round	Group round	(South Korea) Sung Han-soo (6)
2006	First stage	11	10	7	0	3	20	13	+7	21	2nd	First round	Winners	(South Korea) Lee Kil-yong (6)
2006	Second stage	11	10	1	3	6	11	22	−11	6	10th	First round	Winners	(South Korea) Lee Kil-yong (6)
2007	First stage	12	11	2	2	7	8	19	−11	8	11th	First round	Semifinal	(South Korea) Lee Seung-tae (6)
2007	Second stage	12	11	4	2	5	16	23	−7	14	6th	First round	Semifinal	(South Korea) Lee Seung-tae (6)
2008	First stage	14	13	4	4	5	16	19	−3	16	9th	Round of 16	Quarterfinal	(South Korea) Lee Kil-yong (13)
2008	Second stage	14	13	5	3	5	23	15	+8	18	8th	Round of 16	Quarterfinal	(South Korea) Lee Kil-yong (13)
2009	First stage	14	13	6	5	2	21	15	+6	23	4th	First round	Group round	(South Korea) Lee Kil-yong (8)
2009	Second stage	13	12	8	3	1	23	13	+10	27	1st	First round	Group round	(South Korea) Lee Kil-yong (8)
2009	Playoff	4	1	0	0	1	1	3	−2	—	Semifinal	First round	Group round	(South Korea) Lee Kil-yong (8)
2010	First stage	15	14	6	3	5	19	14	+5	21	6th	Round of 32	Group round	(South Korea) Shim Jong-bo (6)
2010	Second stage	15	14	5	4	5	18	15	+3	19	9th	Round of 32	Group round	(South Korea) Shim Jong-bo (6)
2011	Regular season	14	26	11	7	8	37	36	+1	40	5th	Second round	Runners-up	(South Korea) Kim Je-hwan (10)
2011	Playoff	6	3	2	0	1	6	4	+2	—	Semifinal	Second round	Runners-up	(South Korea) Kim Je-hwan (10)
2012	Regular season	14	26	14	4	8	36	30	+6	46	4th	Round of 32	Group round	(South Korea) Kim Joon-tae (9)
2012	Playoff	6	1	0	0	1	0	2	−2	—	First round	Round of 32	Group round	(South Korea) Kim Joon-tae (9)
2013	Regular season	10	27	10	8	9	30	32	–2	38	3rd	Second round	Group round	
2013	Playoff	4	2	0	0	2	2	5	–3	—	Quarterfinal	Second round	Group round	
2014	Regular season	10	27	11	3	13	38	38	0	36	6th	Round of 32	Group round	
2015	Regular season	10	27	13	7	7	37	33	+4	46	2nd	Round of 32	Group round	
2015	Playoff	4	1	0	1	0	0	0	0	—	Semifinal	Round of 32	Group round	
2016	Regular season	10	27	10	9	8	33	29	+4	39	4th	Third round	Group round	
2016	Playoff	4	1	0	0	1	0	2	–2	—	Quarterfinal	Third round	Group round	
2017	Regular season	8	28	7	8	13	33	36	–3	29	6th	Third round	Winners	
2018	Regular season	8	28	5	13	10	28	41	–13	28	6th	Third round	Group round	
2019	Regular season	8	28	5	8	15	23	48	–25	23	8th	Quarterfinals	Group round	
2020	Regular season	16	22	9	7	6	33	25	+8	34	9th	Second round	—	
2021	Regular season	15	28	9	11	8	28	27	+1	38	8th	First round	—	
2022	Regular season	16	30	17	6	7	39	21	+18	57	1st	Third round	—	(Brazil) Luan Costa (13)
2023	Regular season	15	28	7	6	15	23	39	–16	27	14th	Third round	—	
2024	Regular season	16	30	14	8	8	48	31	+17	50	4th	Second round	—	
2025	Regular season	15	28	12	7	9	31	23	+8	43	7th	Second round	—	
