= 2013 Korean FA Cup =

2013 Hana Bank FA Cup

Tournament details
- Country: South Korea
- Teams: 64

Final positions
- Champions: Pohang Steelers (4th title)
- Runners-up: Jeonbuk Hyundai Motors

Tournament statistics
- Matches played: 63
- Goals scored: 213 (3.38 per match)
- Top goal scorer(s): Cho Chan-ho; No Byung-jun; Kevin Oris (3 goals each)

Awards
- Best player: Shin Hwa-yong

The 2013 Korean FA Cup, known as the 2013 Hana Bank FA Cup, was the 18th edition of the Korean FA Cup. Pohang Steelers became champions and qualified for the 2014 AFC Champions League.

== Schedule ==
Round	Date	Matches	Clubs remaining	Clubs involved	New entries this round
First round	10 March 2013	16	64	32	20 university teams 12 Challengers League teams
Second round	13–14 April 2013	16	48	16+16	10 Korea National League teams 6 K League Challenge teams
Round of 32	8 May 2013	16	32	16+16	14 K League Classic teams 2 K League Challenge teams
Round of 16	10 July 2013	8	16	16	None
Quarter-finals	7 August 2013	4	8	8	None
Semi-finals	14–15 September 2013	2	4	4	None
Final	19–20 October 2013	1	2	2	None

== Teams ==
Entry round	Participating teams	
Round of 32	K League Classic All 14 teams of the 2013 season	K League Challenge 2 K League teams of the 2012 season
Round of 32	Busan IPark; Daegu FC; Daejeon Citizen; FC Seoul; Gangwon FC; Gyeongnam FC; Incheon United; Jeju United; Jeonbuk Hyundai Motors; Jeonnam Dragons; Pohang Steelers; Seongnam Ilhwa Chunma; Suwon Samsung Bluewings; Ulsan Hyundai	Gwangju FC; Sangju Sangmu
Second round	Korea National League All 10 teams of the 2013 season	K League Challenge Rest 6 teams of the 2013 season
Second round	Busan Transportation Corporation; Changwon City; Cheonan City; Gangneung City; Gimhae City; Gyeongju KHNP; Incheon Korail; Mokpo City; Hyundai Mipo Dockyard; Yongin City	FC Anyang; Bucheon FC 1995; Chungju Hummel; Goyang Hi FC; Korean Police; Suwon FC
First round	University teams 20 teams	Challengers League Top 12 teams of the 2012 season
First round	Yonsei University; Konkuk University; Yeungnam University; Yewon Arts University; Gwangju University; Honam University; University of Ulsan; Sungkyunkwan University; Hongik University; Soongsil University; Kwangwoon University; Korea University; Yong In University; Chosun University; Dongguk University; Dong-Eui University; Kyung Hee University; Hannam University; Ajou University; Sehan University	Cheonan FC; Cheongju Jikji; Chuncheon FC; Gyeongju Citizen; Gwangju Gwangsan; Icheon Citizen; Jeonbuk Maeil; Jeonnam Yeonggwang; Paju Citizen; FC Pocheon; Seoul United; Yangju Citizen

== Qualifying rounds ==
=== First round ===
The draw for the first round was held on 22 February 2013.

9 March 2013	Yeungnam University	0–2	Kwangwoon University	Yeungnam University, Gyeongsan
15:00 KST			Kwak Hae-sung 79'; Kim Min-hyeok 90+1'	Attendance: 100

10 March 2013	Seoul United	0–3	Honam University	Hyochang Stadium, Seoul
13:00 KST			Jung Min-woo 62'; Heo Chang-su 72'; Jang Ho-ik 90+2'	Attendance: 170

10 March 2013	Cheonan FC	1–2	Dongguk University	Cheonan Football Center, Cheonan
14:00 KST	Hyun Jeong-jin 3'		Lee Je-seung 9'; Lee Ho-seok 66'	Attendance: 150

10 March 2013	Gwangju Gwangsan	0–1	Dong-Eui University	Honam University, Gwangju
14:00 KST			Jang Hee-kwang 84'	Attendance: 200

10 March 2013	Gyeongju Citizen	0–1	Hongik University	Gyeongju Civic Stadium, Gyeongju
14:00 KST			Lee Joon-ho 1'	Attendance: 300

10 March 2013	Icheon Citizen	2–1	Hannam University	Icheon City Stadium, Icheon
14:00 KST	Kwak Joong-keun 8'; Yang Ji-hoon 84'		Lee Hyo-jeong 26'	Attendance: 200

10 March 2013	Jeonbuk Maeil	1–0	Sungkyunkwan University	Jeonju University, Jeonju
14:00 KST	Park Do-yeong 43'			Attendance: 100

10 March 2013	Jeonnam Yeonggwang	2–1	Korea University	Yeonggwang Spotium, Yeonggwang
14:00 KST	Kim Jong-ik 27'; Lee Je-kil 53'		Ahn Sung-min 25'	Attendance: 100

10 March 2013	FC Pocheon	4–2	Yewon Arts University	Pocheon Stadium, Pocheon
14:00 KST	Ahn Sung-nam 9', 39', 47'; Jo Hyung-jae 42'		Song E-rum 20'; Jo Kyung-keun 24'	Attendance: 3,000

10 March 2013	Yangju Citizen	1–2	Kyung Hee University	Yangju Godeok Ground, Yangju
15:00 KST	Lee Tae-young 22'		Kim Hyuk-jin 71'; Yoo Dong-won 78'	Attendance: 200

10 March 2013	Yong In University	8–0	Sehan University	Yong In University, Yongin
14:00 KST	Jang Jun-young 35'; Lee Young-jae 45', 50'; Mun Jun-ho 61', 88'; Seok Dong-woo 82', 84', 86'			Attendance: 250

10 March 2013	Yonsei University	3–0	Ajou University	Yonsei University, Seoul
KST	Song Soo-young 39'; Jung Seung-hyun 49'; Yoo Seong-gi 51'			Attendance: 270

10 March 2013	Cheongju Jikji	5–1	Gwangju University	Cheongju Yongjeong Park, Cheongju
15:00 KST	Kim Hyung-pil 22', 45', 81'; Ahn Seung-hoon 27', 83'		Kim Bada 61'	Attendance: 200

10 March 2013	Paju Citizen	1–0	University of Ulsan	Paju Public Stadium, Paju
15:00 KST	Lee Jong-ho			Attendance: 150

10 March 2013	Soongsil University	2–0	Chuncheon FC	Soongsil University, Seoul
15:00 KST	Hong Dong-hyun 36'; Yang Sung-sik 68'			Attendance: 160

10 March 2013	Konkuk University	1–1 (a.e.t.) (4–3 p)	Chosun University	Hyochang Stadium, Seoul
15:00 KST	Kim Yong-jin 40'		Park Su-yong 88'	Attendance: 140

=== Second round ===
The draw for the second round was held on 13 April 2013.

13 April 2013	Goyang Hi FC	1–1 (a.e.t.) (3–2 p)	Jeonnam Yeonggwang	Goyang Stadium, Goyang
15:00 KST	Alex 98'		Jo Min-kyu 97'	Attendance: 284

13 April 2013	Chungju Hummel	2–0	Yong In University	Chungju Stadium, Chungju
14:00 KST	Han Hong-kyu 51', 71'			Attendance: 392

13 April 2013	Soongsil University	2–2 (a.e.t.) (4–2 p)	Korean Police	Soongsil University, Seoul
15:00 KST	Han Nam-kyu 27'; Kim Seung-jun 48'		Kim Young-hoo 12'; Yang Dong-hyun 75'	Attendance: 1,000

14 April 2013	Icheon Citizen	2–1	Busan Transportation Corporation	Icheon City Stadium, Icheon
14:00 KST	Na Kwang-hyun 12'; Kim Hyun-woo 80'		Park Seung-min 45'	Attendance: 170

13 April 2013	FC Pocheon	0–1	Gimhae City	Pocheon Stadium, Pocheon
15:00 KST			Park Se-young 48'	Attendance: 1,600

13 April 2013	Gangneung City	2–1 (a.e.t.)	Honam University	Gangneung Stadium
19:00 KST	Lee Sung-min 35'; Byun Tae-jun 114'		Kim Tae-jin 42'	Attendance: 600

13 April 2013	Paju Citizen	1–3	Gyeongju KHNP	Paju Public Stadium
15:00 KST	Jo Jae-seok 69'; Moon Kyung-joo (yellow card) 70' (yellow-red card) 75'		Hwang Cheol-hwan 5', 90+2' Yoo Joon-su 89'	Attendance: 150

13 April 2013	Hyundai Mipo Dockyard	1–0	Hongik University	Ulsan Stadium, Ulsan
15:00 KST	Jang Kyung-jin 77'			Attendance: 200

13 April 2013	Jeonbuk Maeil	0–0 (a.e.t.) (3–1 p)	Bucheon FC 1995	Jeonju University, Jeonju
14:00 KST

14 April 2013	Kwangwoon University	2–4	Suwon FC	Paju NFC, Paju
11:00 KST	Kim Min-hyuk 70', 87'		Milić 53', 83'; Lee Chang-ho 77'; Kwon Yong-hyun 84'	Attendance: 58

13 April 2013	FC Anyang	5–4 (a.e.t.)	Cheongju Jikji	Anyang Stadium, Anyang
15:00 KST	Don Ji-deok 23'; Park Byung-won 37', 98'; Ko Kyung-min 57', 114'		Kim Hyung-pil 30'; Kyun Hee-jae 36'; Ka Sol-hyun 80' (o.g.); Kim Kang-min 100'	Attendance: 1,018

13 April 2013	Yongin City	1–0	Kyung Hee University	Yongin Football Center, Yongin
14:00 KST	Han Sang-hak 90+2'			Attendance: 100

13 April 2013	Mokpo City	2–1	Dongguk University	Mokpo International Football Center, Mokpo
15:00 KST	Choi Su-bin 57'; Kim Dong-min 90+2'		Kang Yeon-jae 34'	Attendance: 300

13 April 2013	Changwon City	0–1 (a.e.t.)	Dong-Eui University	Changwon Football Center
16:00 KST			Han Young 112'	Attendance: 200

14 April 2013	Yonsei University	1–0	Incheon Korail	Paju NFC, Paju
14:00 KST	Choi Chi-won (footballer) 24'			Attendance: 87

13 April 2013	Cheonan City	0–0 (a.e.t.) (2–3 p)	Konkuk University	Cheonan Football Center, Cheonan
14:00 KST				Attendance: 300

== Final rounds ==
=== Bracket ===
Round of 32
FC Seoul	3
Yonsei University	0
Gwangju FC (a.e.t.)	3
Chungju Hummel	2
Busan IPark	1
Gimhae City	0
Gangwon FC (a.e.t.)	3
Gyeongju KHNP	2
Ulsan Hyundai	3
Icheon Citizen	0
Jeonbuk Hyundai Motors	2
Yongin City	0
Jeonnam Dragons (p)	0 (10)
Gangneung City	0 (9)
Daegu FC	0
Suwon FC	1
Gyeongnam FC	2
Hyundai Mipo Dockyard	0
Daejeon Citizen	0
Goyang Hi FC	1
Seongnam Ilhwa Chunma (a.e.t.)	4
Dong-Eui University	2
Pohang Steelers	4
Soongsil University	0
Jeju United	2
Konkuk University	1
Suwon Samsung Bluewings	2
FC Anyang	1
Incheon United	4
Jeonbuk Maeil	1
Sangju Sangmu	4
Mokpo City	1

Round of 16
FC Seoul (a.e.t.)	2
Gwangju FC	1
Busan IPark	2
Gangwon FC	1
Ulsan Hyundai	0
Jeonbuk Hyundai Motors	1
Jeonnam Dragons	3
Suwon FC	4
Gyeongnam FC	1
Goyang Hi FC	0
Seongnam Ilhwa Chunma	1 (2)
Pohang Steelers (p)	1 (4)
Jeju United	1
Suwon Samsung Bluewings	0
Incheon United (a.e.t.)	2
Sangju Sangmu	1

Quarter-finals
FC Seoul	1
Busan IPark	2
Jeonbuk Hyundai Motors	7
Suwon FC	2
Gyeongnam FC	1
Pohang Steelers	2
Jeju United	2
Incheon United	0

Semi-finals
15 September – Busan
Busan IPark	1
Jeonbuk Hyundai Motors	3
14 September – Seogwipo
Pohang Steelers	4
Jeju United	2

Final
19 October – Jeonju
Jeonbuk Hyundai Motors	1 (3)
Pohang Steelers (p)	1 (4)

=== Round of 32 ===
The draw for the round of 32 was held on 18 April 2013.

8 May 2013	Daegu FC	0–1	Suwon FC	Daegu Stadium, Daegu
19:30 KST			Kim Han-won 90'	Attendance: 508

8 May 2013	Gwangju FC	3–2 (a.e.t.)	Chungju Hummel	Gwangju World Cup Stadium, Gwangju
19:00 KST	Kim Jun-yeop 71'; Kim Eun-sun 90'; Park Hyun 120'		Han Hong-kyu 47', 86'	Attendance: 313

8 May 2013	Jeju United	2–1	Konkuk University	Jeju World Cup Stadium, Seogwipo
19:00 KST	Ahn Jong-hun 29'; Waldison 45'		Jo Young-jun 73'	Attendance: 471

8 May 2013	Ulsan Hyundai	3–0	Icheon Citizen	Ulsan Munsu Football Stadium, Ulsan
19:30 KST	Kim Seung-yong 29', 46'; Kim Yong-tae 90'			Attendance: 518

8 May 2013	Gyeongnam FC	2–0	Hyundai Mipo Dockyard	Changwon Football Center, Changwon
19:30 KST	Sretenović 8'; Lee Jae-an 71'			Attendance: 523

8 May 2013	FC Seoul	3–0	Yonsei University	Seoul World Cup Stadium, Seoul
19:30 KST	Kim Hyun-sung 51'; Damjanović 83'; Lee Sang-hyup 87'			Attendance: 1,835

8 May 2013	Incheon United	4–1	Jeonbuk Maeil	Incheon Football Stadium, Incheon
19:30 KST	Nam Joon-jae 40'; Seol Ki-hyeon 58'; Francis 86'; Lee Hyo-kyun 90+2'		Kim Hae-su 88'	Attendance: 1,056

8 May 2013	Daejeon Citizen	0–1	Goyang Hi FC	Daejeon World Cup Stadium, Daejeon
19:30 KST			Jin Chang-soo 37'	Attendance: 521

8 May 2013	Pohang Steelers	4–0	Soongsil University	Pohang Steel Yard, Pohang
19:30 KST	Lee Myung-joo 14'; Cho Chan-ho 59', 71'; Bae Chun-suk 75'			Attendance: 1,447

8 May 2013	Gangwon FC	3–2 (a.e.t.)	Gyeongju KHNP	Gangneung Stadium, Gangneung
19:00 KST	Zicu 13', 91'; Lee Jun-yeob 35'		Jo Joo-young 26'; Hwnag Hoon-hee 67'	Attendance: 918

8 May 2013	Jeonbuk Hyundai Motors	2–0	Yongin City	Jeonju World Cup Stadium, Jeonju
19:00 KST	Oris 24', 66'			Attendance: 1,400

8 May 2013	Sangju Sangmu	4–1	Mokpo City	Sangju Civic Stadium, Sangju
19:30 KST	Kim Dong-chan 19'; Ha Tae-goon 70', 84'; Lee Sang-hyup 74'		Kwon Soon-hak 46'	Attendance: 600

8 May 2013	Jeonnam Dragons	0–0 (a.e.t.) (10–9 p)	Gangneung City	Gwangyang Football Stadium, Gwangyang
19:30 KST				Attendance: 407
	Penalties
	Wesley (penalty missed); Cornthwaite (penalty missed); Lee Sang-ho (penalty scored); Lee Yong-seung (penalty missed); Park Seung-il (penalty scored); Kim Dong-chul (penalty scored); Kim Young-wook (penalty scored); Lee Joong-kwon (penalty scored); Lee Seul-chan (penalty scored); Ryu Won-woo (penalty missed); Jung Keun-hee (penalty scored); Wesley (penalty scored); Lee Joong-kwon (penalty scored); Park Seung-il (penalty scored)		(penalty missed) Lee Sung-min; (penalty scored) Kim Joon-beom; (penalty missed) Lee Jong-hyeok; (penalty scored) Son Dae-sung; (penalty missed) Kim Tae-jin; (penalty scored) Kim Jae-hoon; (penalty scored) Kim Gyu-tae; (penalty scored) Kim Sang-jun; (penalty scored) Heo Jin-gu; (penalty missed) Lee Hyun-joon; (penalty scored) Seok Hyeong-gon; (penalty scored) Kim Joon-beom; (penalty scored) Lee Sung-min; (penalty missed) Son Dae-sung

8 May 2013	Gimhae City	0–1	Busan IPark	Gimhae Stadium, Gimhae
19:00 KST			Lim Sang-hyub 57'	Attendance: 900

8 May 2013	FC Anyang	1–2	Suwon Samsung Bluewings	Anyang Stadium, Anyang
20:00 KST	Jeong Jae-yong 53'		Jeong Hyun-yoon 87' (o.g.); Seo Jung-jin 90+4'	Attendance: 11,724

8 May 2013	Seongnam Ilhwa Chunma	4–2 (a.e.t.)	Dong-Eui University	Tancheon Sports Complex, Seongnam
19:30 KST	Hwang Ui-jo 1'; Lee Seung-ryul 17'; Kim Hyun 108'; Djeparov 120'		Nam Se-in 37', 43'	Attendance: 438

=== Round of 16 ===
The draw for the round of 16 was held on 29 May 2013.

10 July 2013	Incheon United	2–1 (a.e.t.)	Sangju Sangmu	Incheon Football Stadium, Incheon
19:30 KST	Thiago 49'; Nam Joon-jae 108'		Ha Tae-goon 73'	Attendance: 1,136

10 July 2013	Seongnam Ilhwa Chunma	1–1 (a.e.t.) (2–4 p)	Pohang Steelers	Tancheon Sports Complex, Seongnam
19:30 KST	Kim Dong-sub 10'		No Byung-jun 58'	Attendance: 1,421
	Penalties
	Lim Chae-min (penalty scored); Lee Seung-yeoul (penalty missed); Kim Chul-ho (penalty missed); Kim Dong-sub (penalty scored)		(penalty scored) Shin Kwang-hoon; (penalty scored) Lee Myung-joo; (penalty scored) Ko Mu-yeol; (penalty scored) Cho Chan-ho

10 July 2013	Busan IPark	2–1	Gangwon FC	Busan Asiad Stadium, Busan
19:30 KST	Fagner 20'; Bang Seung-hwan 76'		Kim Dong-ki 41'	Attendance: 525

10 July 2013	Gyeongnam FC	1–0	Goyang Hi FC	Changwon Football Center, Changwon
19:30 KST	Lee Jae-an 88'			Attendance: 469

10 July 2013	Ulsan Hyundai	0–1	Jeonbuk Hyundai Motors	Ulsan Munsu Football Stadium, Ulsan
19:30 KST			Lee Dong-gook 83'	Attendance: 3,176

10 July 2013	Jeju United	1–0	Suwon Samsung Bluewings	Jeju World Cup Stadium, Seogwipo
19:00 KST	Song Jin-hyung 23'			Attendance: 1,421

10 July 2013	Jeonnam Dragons	3–4	Suwon FC	Gwangyang Football Stadium, Gwangyang
19:00 KST	Im Kyung-hyun 50', 85'; Kim Young-wook 75'		Ha Jung-heon 38', 45+2'; Jo Tae-woo 43'; Lee Jung-heon 67'	Attendance: 1,069

10 July 2013	FC Seoul	2–1 (a.e.t.)	Gwangju FC	Seoul World Cup Stadium, Seoul
19:30 KST	Han Tae-you 113'; Molina 120'		Kim Eun-sun 91'	Attendance: 3,508

=== Quarter-finals ===
The draw for the quarter-finals was held on 18 July 2013.

7 August 2013	FC Seoul	1–2	Busan IPark	Seoul World Cup Stadium, Seoul
19:30 KST	Ha Dae-sung 90+1'		Fagner 69'; Park Jong-woo 73'	Attendance: 6,602

7 August 2013	Jeonbuk Hyundai Motors	7–2	Suwon FC	Jeonju World Cup Stadium, Jeonju
19:00 KST	Lee Dong-gook 18'; Oh Kwang-jin 25' (o.g.); Lee Seung-gi 30'; Park Hee-do 49'; Leonardo 70'; Thiago Potiguar 75'; Oris 83'		Kim Seo-jun 81'; Park Jong-chan 87'	Attendance: 5,504

7 August 2013	Gyeongnam FC	1–2	Pohang Steelers	Changwon Football Center, Changwon
19:30 KST	Bosančić 84'		No Byung-jun 68'; Ko Mu-yeol 88'	Attendance: 1,505

7 August 2013	Jeju United	2–0	Incheon United	Jeju World Cup Stadium, Seogwipo
19:00 KST	Bae Il-hwan 30'; Yoon Bit-garam 76'			Attendance: 1,003

=== Semi-finals ===
The draw for the semi-finals was held on 21 August 2013.

14 September 2013	Jeju United	2–4	Pohang Steelers	Jeju World Cup Stadium, Seogwipo
15:00 KST	Maranhão 1'; Pedro Júnior 58'		Ko Mu-yeol 9'; No Byung-jun 48'; Park Sung-ho 62'; Cho Chan-ho 80'	Attendance: 1,787

15 September 2013	Busan IPark	1–3	Jeonbuk Hyundai Motors	Busan Asiad Stadium, Busan
15:00 KST	Lee Jung-ho 25'		Jeong Hyuk 10'; Lee Kyu-ro 57'; Leonardo 90+3'	Attendance: 12,523

=== Final ===
19 October 2013	Jeonbuk Hyundai Motors	1–1 (a.e.t.) (3–4 p)	Pohang Steelers	Jeonju World Cup Stadium, Jeonju
13:30 KST	Kim Kee-hee 33'		Kim Seung-dae 24'	Attendance: 23,447
	Penalties
	Leonardo (penalty missed); Oris (penalty missed); Wilkinson (penalty scored); Thiago Potiguar (penalty scored); Seo Sang-min (penalty scored)		(penalty missed) Lee Myung-joo; (penalty scored) Shin Kwang-hoon; (penalty scored) Cho Chan-ho; (penalty scored) Ko Mu-yeol; (penalty scored) Kim Tae-su

== Awards ==
=== Main awards ===
Award	Winner	Team
Most Valuable Player	(South Korea) Shin Hwa-yong	Pohang Steelers
Top goalscorer	Not awarded	
Best Manager	(South Korea) Kang Chul	Pohang Steelers
Fair Play Award	Jeju United	

=== Man of the Round ===
Round	Winner	Team
First round	(South Korea) Ahn Sung-nam	FC Pocheon
Second round	(South Korea) Kim Seung-jun	Soongsil University
Round of 32	(South Korea) Cho Chan-ho	Pohang Steelers
Round of 16	(South Korea) Ha Jung-heon	Suwon FC
Quarter-finals	(South Korea) Ko Mu-yeol	Pohang Steelers
Semi-finals	(South Korea) Lee Kyu-ro	Jeonbuk Hyundai Motors

== See also ==
- 2013 in South Korean football
- 2013 K League Classic
- 2013 K League Challenge
- 2013 Korea National League
- 2013 Challengers League
