= List of Yongin City FC records and statistics =

== National League records ==
By Year

Year	Position	Games	Wins	Draws	Losses	Goals Scored	Goals Against
2010	6th	28	12	9	7	41	29
2011	11th	26	5	11	10	22	32
2012	6th	26	12	6	8	37	35
2013	9th	27	8	8	11	37	38
total	-	107	37	34	36	137	134

By Team (2010-2013)

Opponent	Played	Wins	Draws	Losses	For	Against
Ansan H	6	4	2	0	7	2
Busan Transportation Corp.	9	0	4	5	5	12
Changwon City	9	2	6	1	9	8
Cheonan City	9	3	3	3	15	13
Chungju Hummel	6	3	2	1	11	8
Gangneung City	9	2	4	3	9	10
Gimhae FC	9	2	3	4	15	17
Goyang KB	6	1	2	3	5	8
Gyeongju HNP	9	4	2	3	11	10
Incheon Korail	9	3	2	4	14	18
Mokpo City	9	6	1	2	15	9
Suwon City	6	3	3	0	9	4
Ulsan Mipo Dockyard	9	2	0	7	5	15
Yesan FC	2	2	0	0	7	0

Record of wins

Records	Date (Opponent)
1st	27/03/2010 vs Chungju Hummel H (1-0)
10th	15/10/2010 vs Goyang KB H (2-0)
20th	25/04/2012 vs Daejeon HNP H (3-0)
30th	09/03/2013 vs Ulsan Mipo Dockyard A (1-0)

Other records

- Record for consecutive wins : 4 – 19/03/2011 ~ 05/04/2011
- Record for consecutive draws: 4 – 13/09/2013 ~ 02/10/2013
- Record for consecutive defeats: 4 – 29/06/2012 ~ 03/08/2012
- Record for matches without losing: 8 – 07/04/2012 ~ 23/06/2012
- Record for matches without winning: 12 – 23/07/2011 ~ 24/09/2011
- Record victory: 5-0 v Yesan FC (10/04/2010) & Gangneung City (07/09/2013)
- Record defeat: 0-4 v FC Seoul (18/05/2011), Korean Police FC (28/04/2012) & Ulsan Mipo Dockyard (29/06/2012)
- Highest scoring match: 4-4 v Gimhae FC (01/10/2011)

== Korean FA Cup records ==
Season	Date	Round	Opponent	Result
2010	20/03/2010	Second Round	Kwangwoon University	1-1 (aet), 6-7 pens
2011	18/05/2011	Third Round	FC Seoul	0-4
2012	28/04/2012	Second Round	Korean Police FC	0-4
2013	13/04/2013	Second Round	Kyunghee University	1-0
2013	08/05/2013	Third Round	Jeonbuk Hyundai Motors	0-2
