= 2013 Korea National League Championship =

KHNP 2013 National League Championship

Tournament details
- Country: South Korea
- City: Yanggu, Gangwon
- Dates: 1–14 June 2013
- Teams: 10

Final positions
- Champions: Incheon Korail (1st title)
- Runners-up: Cheonan City

Tournament statistics
- Matches played: 23
- Goals scored: 61 (2.65 per match)
- Top goal scorer(s): Kim Tae-wook (5 goals)

Awards
- Best player: Kim Hyung-woon
- Best goalkeeper: Kim Hong-beom

The 2013 Korea National League Championship, known as Korea Hydro & Nuclear Power 2013 National League Championship, was the tenth competition of the Korea National League Championship.

== Group stage ==
=== Group A ===
Team	Pld	W	D	L	GF	GA	GD	Pts
Gangneung City	4	2	2	0	6	3	+3	8
Cheonan City	4	2	0	2	8	6	+2	6
Gyeongju KHNP	4	1	3	0	5	4	+1	6
Gimhae City	4	1	1	2	4	7	–3	4
Yongin City	4	0	2	2	2	5	–3	2

1 June 2013
14:00

Gyeongju KHNP	2–1	Cheonan City
Hwang Ho-lyeong 22'; Song Han-ki 41'		Kim Jin-sol 7'

Yanggu Sports Complex A, Yanggu

1 June 2013
16:00

Gimhae City	1–0	Yongin City
Ku Hyun-seo 9'

Yanggu Sports Complex A, Yanggu

3 June 2013
14:00

Yongin City	1–1	Gangneung City
Ryu Seon-gon 59'		Ahn Seong-hoon 32'

Yanggu Sports Complex B, Yanggu

3 June 2013
16:00

Gimhae City	1–1	Gyeongju KHNP
Ku Hyun-seo 29'		Hwnag Cheol-hwan 89'

Yanggu Sports Complex B, Yanggu

5 June 2013
14:00

Cheonan City	4–2	Gimhae City
Noh Yong-hun 5'; Jo Hyeok 8'; Noh Seong-chan 66'; Kim Jin-sol 90+2'		Lee Hae-jeong 33'; Choi Jin-seok 45'

Yanggu Sports Complex B, Yanggu

5 June 2013
16:00

Gangneung City	1–1	Gyeongju KHNP
Lee Sung-min 50'		Yoo Dong-min 87'

Yanggu Sports Complex B, Yanggu

7 June 2013
14:00

Gyeongju KHNP	1–1	Yongin City
Lee Sang-yong 78'		Oh Chang-young 90+2'

Yanggu Sports Complex A, Yanggu

7 June 2013
16:00

Gangneung City	2–1	Cheonan City
Lee Joon-hyup 11'; Lee Haeng-su 63'		Kwak Lae-seung 43'

Yanggu Sports Complex A, Yanggu

9 June 2013
14:00

Gimhae City	0–2	Gangneung City
		Lee Kwan-yong 9'; Kook Seung-eun 79'

Yanggu Sports Complex A, Yanggu

9 June 2013
16:00

Yongin City	0–2	Cheonan City
		Kang Young-je 25'; Lee Hyun-jin 78'

Yanggu Sports Complex A, Yanggu

=== Group B ===
Team	Pld	W	D	L	GF	GA	GD	Pts
Mokpo City	4	3	1	0	7	2	+5	10
Incheon Korail	4	2	1	1	9	6	+3	7
Changwon City	4	1	1	2	4	5	–1	4
Hyundai Mipo Dockyard	4	1	1	2	4	7	–3	4
Busan Transportation Corporation	4	0	2	2	4	8	–4	2

2 June 2013
14:00

Busan Transportation Corporation	0–0	Changwon City

Yanggu Sports Complex B, Yanggu

2 June 2013
16:00

Mokpo City	1–1	Incheon Korail
Jang Jae-woo 57'		Choi Young-kwang 44'

Yanggu Sports Complex B, Yanggu

4 June 2013
14:00

Incheon Korail	3–0	Hyundai Mipo Dockyard
Jeong Hyung-joon 67' (o.g.); Yoon Seung-hyun 76'; Kim Tae-wook 84'

Yanggu Sports Complex A, Yanggu

4 June 2013
16:00

Mokpo City	2–0	Busan Transportation Corporation
Han Jae-man 23'; Yoon Kwang-bok 67'

Yanggu Sports Complex A, Yanggu

6 June 2013
14:00

Changwon City	1–2	Mokpo City
Kwak Chul-ho 63'		Kim Dong-min 32'; Hong Hyung-ki 57'

Yanggu Sports Complex A, Yanggu

6 June 2013
16:00

Hyundai Mipo Dockyard	1–1	Busan Transportation Corporation
Lee Yong-joon 31'		Park Kyu-tae 8'

Yanggu Sports Complex A, Yanggu

8 June 2013
14:00

Busan Transportation Corporation	3–5	Incheon Korail
Choi Jin-tak 23'; Shin Young-woong 63'; Kang Jin-kyu 81'		Lee Seung-hwan 3'; Shin Hyun-ho 45'; Kim Tae-wook 64', 67'; Woo Joo-young 77'

Yanggu Sports Complex B, Yanggu

8 June 2013
16:00

Hyundai Mipo Dockyard	3–1	Changwon City
Kim Min-ki 43', 53'; Tae Hyun-chan 90'		Song Keun-soo 66'

Yanggu Sports Complex B, Yanggu

10 June 2013
14:00

Mokpo City	2–0	Hyundai Mipo Dockyard
Kwon Soon-hak 8'; Choi Su-bin 18'

Yanggu Sports Complex A, Yanggu

10 June 2013
16:00

Incheon Korail	0–2	Changwon City
		Jeong Dae-woon 10'; Lim Dong-min 14'

Yanggu Sports Complex A, Yanggu

== Knockout stage ==
=== Bracket ===
Semifinals
A1	Gangneung City	1
B2	Incheon Korail	2
B1	Mokpo City	0 (3)
A2	Cheonan City (p)	0 (4)

Final
Incheon Korail	5
Cheonan City	0

=== Semi-finals ===
12 June 2013
14:00

Gangneung City	1–2	Incheon Korail
Lee Sung-min 78'		Kim Hyung-woon 44'; Kim Tae-wook 64'

Yanggu Sports Complex A, Yanggu

12 June 2013
16:00

Mokpo City	0–0 (a.e.t.)	Cheonan City
Penalties
? (penalty scored); ? (penalty scored); ? (penalty scored); Lee Jae-joon (penalty missed); Jo Keon-woo (penalty missed)	3–4	(penalty missed) Lee Hyun-jin; (penalty scored) ?; (penalty scored) ?; (penalty scored) ?; (penalty scored) ?

Yanggu Sports Complex A, Yanggu

=== Final ===
14 June 2013
14:00

Incheon Korail	5–0	Cheonan City
Lee In-kyu 15'; Kim Chang-hee 23'; Kim Hyung-woon 50'; Lee Seung-hwan 59'; Kim Tae-wook 78'

Yanggu Sports Complex A, Yanggu

== See also ==
- 2013 in South Korean football
- 2013 Korea National League
