= 2019 Korea National League Championship =

Tournament details
- Country: South Korea
- Cities: Seogwipo, Jeju
- Dates: 19 May – 2 June 2019
- Teams: 8

Final positions
- Champions: Gyeongju KHNP (3rd title)
- Runners-up: Gangneung City

Tournament statistics
- Matches played: 15
- Top goal scorer: Kim Jong-min (3 goals)

Awards
- Best player: Lee Woo-jin
- Best goalkeeper: Kim Tae-hong

The 2019 Korea National League Championship was the 16th and last competition of the Korea National League Championship. After this competition, Korea National League was abolished and the teams competing in the championship were absorbed by the K3 League in 2020.

== Group stage ==
=== Group A ===
Team	Pld	W	D	L	GF	GA	GD	Pts
Daejeon Korail	3	1	1	1	3	2	+1	4
Busan Transportation Corporation	3	1	1	1	5	5	0	4
Gimhae City	3	1	1	1	3	3	0	4
Cheonan City	3	1	1	1	3	4	–1	4

19 May 2019
15:00

Daejeon Korail	3–1	Busan Transportation Corporation
Han Bit 13'; Kim Tae-eun 22'; Lee Gwan-pyo 73'	Report	Jeong Seo-un 34'

Gang Chang-hak Park, Seogwipo

20 May 2019
13:00

Gimhae City	1–2	Cheonan City
Patrick 19'	Report	Jo Yi-rok 32'; Lee Yong-jun 75'

Gang Chang-hak Park, Seogwipo

22 May 2019
15:00

Daejeon Korail	0–1	Gimhae City
	Report	Lee Da-won 85'

Gang Chang-hak Practice Park, Seogwipo

22 May 2019
17:00

Busan Transportation Corporation	3–1	Cheonan City
Kong Da-hee 43'; Kim Seong-jin 56'; Lee Min-woo 89'	Report	Bae Ji-hun 55'

Gang Chang-hak Practice Park, Seogwipo

25 May 2019
15:00

Cheonan City	0–0	Daejeon Korail
	Report

Gang Chang-hak Park, Seogwipo

25 May 2019
15:00

Gimhae City	1–1	Busan Transportation Corporation
An Sang-min 40'	Report	Park Jeong-min 38'

Gang Chang-hak Practice Park, Seogwipo

=== Group B ===
Team	Pld	W	D	L	GF	GA	GD	Pts
Gangneung City	3	2	1	0	4	1	+3	7
Gyeongju KHNP	3	2	0	1	6	2	+4	6
Changwon City	3	0	2	1	0	4	–4	2
Mokpo City	3	0	1	2	2	5	–2	1

20 May 2019
15:00

Gyeongju KHNP	4–0	Changwon City
Yun Tae-su 13'; Lee Wu-jin 45+2'; Kim Min-kyu 56', 64'	Report

Gang Chang-hak Practice Park, Seogwipo

20 May 2019
17:00

Gangneung City	3–1	Mokpo City
Kim Hye-seong 59'; Shin Young-jun 73'; Kim Jong-min 86'	Report	Lee Jun-hyeok 20'

Gang Chang-hak Practice Park, Seogwipo

23 May 2019
15:00

Gyeongju KHNP	0–1	Gangneung City
	Report	Lee Seung-hyeon 85'

Gang Chang-hak Park, Seogwipo

23 May 2019
17:00

Changwon City	0–0	Mokpo City
	Report

Gang Chang-hak Park, Seogwipo

26 May 2019
15:00

Mokpo City	1–2	Gyeongju KHNP
Kim Jun 88'	Report	Kim Min-kyu 43'; Ju Han-seong 72'

Gang Chang-hak Park, Seogwipo

26 May 2019
15:00

Gangneung City	0–0	Changwon City
	Report

Gang Chang-hak Practice Park, Seogwipo

== Knockout stage ==
=== Bracket ===
Semi-finals
A1	Daejeon Korail	0
B2	Gyeongju KHNP	2
B1	Gangneung City	3
A2	Busan Transportation Corporation	1

Final
Gyeongju KHNP	2
Gangneung City	0

=== Semi-finals ===
29 May 2019
15:00

Daejeon Korail	0–2	Gyeongju KHNP
	Report	Lee Hyeong-seung 19'; Lim Seong-taek 83'

Gang Chang-hak Park, Seogwipo

29 May 2019
17:00

Gangneung City	3–1	Busan Transportation Corporation
Kim Jong-min 18', 89'; Lee Jung-Seo 45+1'	Report	Park Jeong-min 57'

Gang Chang-hak Park, Seogwipo

=== Final ===
2 June 2019
15:00

Gyeongju KHNP	2–0	Gangneung City
Ju Han-seong 17'; Jo Kyu-seong 65'	Report

Gang Chang-hak Park, Seogwipo

== See also ==
- 2019 in South Korean football
- 2019 Korea National League
