= 2019 Korea National League =

Kyobo Life Korea National League
- Season: 2019
- Dates: 16 March – 9 November 2019
- Champions: Gangneung City (2nd title)
- Matches: 56
- Goals: 267 (4.77 per match)
- Best Player: Shin Young-joon
- Top goalscorer: Seo Dong-hyeon; Shin Young-joon (15 goals each)

The 2019 Korea National League was the 17th and last season of the Korea National League, the third-highest division of the South Korean football league system. After this season, Korea National League clubs competed in the newly developed K3 League.

== Teams ==
Locations of the 2019 Korea National League clubs

Team	Location	Stadium
Busan Transportation Corporation	Busan	Busan Gudeok Stadium
Changwon City	Changwon	Changwon Football Center
Cheonan City	Cheonan	Cheonan Stadium
Daejeon Korail	Daejeon	Daejeon Hanbat Stadium
Gangneung City	Gangneung	Gangneung Stadium
Gimhae City	Gimhae	Gimhae Stadium
Gyeongju KHNP	Gyeongju	Gyeongju Civic Stadium
Mokpo City	Mokpo	Mokpo International Football Center

== Regular season ==
=== League table ===
Pos	Team	Pld	W	D	L	GF	GA	GD	Pts	Qualification or relegation
1	Gangneung City (C)	28	19	4	5	50	26	+24	61	Qualification for playoffs final
2	Cheonan City	28	12	8	8	32	33	−1	44	Qualification for playoffs semi-final
3	Gyeongju KHNP	28	10	11	7	35	28	+7	41	Qualification for playoffs semi-final
4	Daejeon Korail	28	10	9	9	38	36	+2	39	
5	Busan Transportation Corporation	28	9	11	8	37	32	+5	38	
6	Mokpo City	28	7	8	13	26	35	−9	29	
7	Gimhae FC	28	7	7	14	26	29	−3	28	
8	Changwon City	28	5	8	15	23	48	−25	23	

Source: Korea National League
Rules for classification: 1) Points; 2) Goal difference; 3) Goals scored
(C) Champions

=== Results ===
==== Matches 1–14 ====
Home \ Away	BTC	CWC	CAC	DJK	GNC	GHC	GJK	MPC
Busan Transportation Corporation	—	1–1	1–2	3–0	1–1	2–1	2–1	0–1
Changwon City	0–4	—	2–1	2–2	0–1	0–3	1–1	3–0
Cheonan City	2–2	1–1	—	1–0	0–1	0–2	0–3	2–1
Daejeon Korail	1–1	1–1 (Note: Played at opponents' ground.)	1–1	—	1–1	1–1	1–0	1–2
Gangneung City	3–2	3–0	2–0	2–1	—	2–0	0–0	4–2
Gimhae City	0–0	1–0	1–2	1–2	1–2	—	1–1	0–1
Gyeongju KHNP	0–0	3–1	0–0	2–1	2–0	0–2	—	1–0
Mokpo City	0–3	0–0	0–1	2–2	0–1	2–1	2–0	—

Source: Korea National League
Legend: Blue = home team win; Yellow = draw; Red = away team win.

==== Matches 15–28 ====
Home \ Away	BTC	CWC	CAC	DJK	GNC	GHC	GJK	MPC
Busan Transportation Corporation	—	1–2	1–1	2–0	1–3	1–1	2–2	1–0
Changwon City	0–0	—	1–2	1–3 (Note: Played at opponents' ground.)	0–1	1–0	0–4	1–2
Cheonan City	1–0	3–0	—	2–1	2–1	1–0	0–2	2–2
Daejeon Korail	3–0	2–1	3–2	—	2–0	0–3	2–1	1–0
Gangneung City	2–3	3–0	4–1	0–3	—	2–1	3–1	1–0
Gimhae City	2–0	0–2	0–1	1–1	0–1	—	1–1	1–0
Gyeongju KHNP	1–1	4–1	1–1	1–0	1–5	0–0	—	1–1
Mokpo City	1–2	1–1	0–0	2–2	1–1	3–1	1–1	—

Source: Korea National League
Legend: Blue = home team win; Yellow = draw; Red = away team win.

== Championship playoffs ==
Semi-final					Final
					1	Gangneung City	0	2	2
2	Cheonan City	0	2	2	SF	Gyeongju KHNP	0	0	0
3	Gyeongju KHNP	2	2	4

== Top scorers ==
Seo Dong-hyeon won the top scorer award due to a smaller number of appearances.

Rank	Player	Club	Goals
1	(South Korea) Shin Young-joon	Gangneung City	15
1	(South Korea) Seo Dong-hyeon	Gyeongju KHNP	15
3	(South Korea) Cho Woo-jin	Gangneung City	13
4	(South Korea) Lee Min-woo	Busan Transportation Corporation	9
5	(South Korea) Lee Gwan-pyo	Daejeon Korail	7
5	(South Korea) Lee Kang-uk	Busan Transportation Corporation	7
7	(South Korea) Kim Jeong-ju	Daejeon Korail	6
7	(South Korea) Cho Seok-jae	Daejeon Korail	6
7	(South Korea) Ahn Sang-min	Gimhae City	6
7	(South Korea) Heo Jun-ho	Cheonan City	6
7	(South Korea) Kong Da-hee	Busan Transportation Corporation	6

== Attendance ==
Pos	Team	Total	High	Low	Average	Change
1	Gimhae City	10,016	1,508	287	715	n/a
2	Cheonan City	8,605	987	327	615	n/a
3	Busan Transportation Corporation	5,598	1,700	187	400	n/a
4	Gangneung City	5,153	575	181	368	n/a
5	Gyeongju KHNP	3,799	624	105	271	n/a
6	Mokpo City	2,682	550	86	192	n/a
7	Changwon City	2,625	652	50	188	n/a
8	Daejeon Korail	1,841	350	64	132	n/a
	League total	40,319	1,700	50	360	n/a

Source: Korea National League

== See also ==
- 2019 in South Korean football
- 2019 Korea National League Championship
- 2019 Korean FA Cup
