= 2013 in South Korean football =

Football in South Korea
- Season: 2013

Men's football
- K League Classic: Pohang Steelers
- K League Challenge: Sangju Sangmu
- National League: Hyundai Mipo Dockyard
- Challengers League: Pocheon Citizen
- Korean FA Cup: Pohang Steelers

Women's football
- WK League: Incheon Hyundai Steel Red Angels

This article shows a summary of the 2013 football season in South Korea.

== National teams ==
=== FIFA World Cup qualification ===
26 March AFC fourth round, Group A	South Korea	2–1	Qatar	Seoul, South Korea
20:00 UTC+9	Lee Keun-ho 60'; Son Heung-min 90+6'	Report	Ibrahim 63'	Stadium: Seoul World Cup Stadium; Attendance: 37,222; Referee: Yuichi Nishimura (Japan)

4 June AFC fourth round, Group A	Lebanon	1–1	South Korea	Beirut, Lebanon
20:30 UTC+3	Maatouk 12'	Report	Kim Chi-woo 90+6'	Stadium: Camille Chamoun Sports City Stadium; Attendance: 8,430; Referee: Benjamin Williams (Australia)

11 June AFC fourth round, Group A	South Korea	1–0	Uzbekistan	Seoul, South Korea
20:00 UTC+9	Shorakhmedov 42' (o.g.)	Report		Stadium: Seoul World Cup Stadium; Attendance: 50,699; Referee: Minoru Tōjō (Japan)

18 June AFC fourth round, Group A	South Korea	0–1	Iran	Ulsan, South Korea
		Report	Ghoochannejhad 59'	Stadium: Ulsan Munsu Football Stadium; Attendance: 43,343; Referee: Tan Hai (China)

AFC fourth round, Group A table
Pos	Team	Pld	W	D	L	GF	GA	GD	Pts	Qualification
1	Iran	8	5	1	2	8	2	+6	16	Qualification for World Cup
2	South Korea	8	4	2	2	13	7	+6	14	Qualification for World Cup
3	Uzbekistan	8	4	2	2	11	6	+5	14	Advance to AFC fifth round
4	Qatar	8	2	1	5	5	13	−8	7	
5	Lebanon	8	1	2	5	3	12	−9	5	

Source: RSSSF

=== EAFF Championship ===
20 July	South Korea	0–0	Australia	Seoul, South Korea
19:00 UTC+9		Report		Stadium: Seoul World Cup Stadium; Attendance: 31,571; Referee: Yuichi Nishimura (Japan)

24 July	South Korea	0–0	China	Hwaseong, South Korea
20:00 UTC+9		Report		Stadium: Hwaseong Stadium; Attendance: 23,675; Referee: Valentin Kovalenko (Uzbekistan)

28 July	South Korea	1–2	Japan	Seoul, South Korea
20:00 UTC+9	Yun Il-lok 33'	Report	Kakitani 24', 90+1'	Stadium: Jamsil Olympic Stadium; Attendance: 47,258; Referee: Ben Williams (Australia)

Pos	Team	Pld	W	D	L	GF	GA	GD	Pts
1	Japan (C)	3	2	1	0	8	6	+2	7
2	China	3	1	2	0	7	6	+1	5
3	South Korea (H)	3	0	2	1	1	2	−1	2
4	Australia	3	0	1	2	5	7	−2	1

Source: EAFF
(C) Champions; (H) Hosts

=== Friendlies ===
==== Senior team ====
6 February	South Korea	0–4	Croatia	London, England
14:05		Report	Mandžukić 32'; Srna 40'; Jelavić 57'; Petrić 85'	Stadium: Craven Cottage; Attendance: 12,000; Referee: Michael Oliver (England)

14 August	South Korea	0–0	Peru	Suwon, South Korea
20:00		Report		Stadium: Suwon World Cup Stadium; Attendance: 36,021; Referee: Abdul Malik Abdul Bashir (Singapore)

6 September	South Korea	4–1	Haiti	Incheon, South Korea
20:00 UTC+9	Son Heung-min 20', 72'; Koo Ja-cheol 49' (pen.); Lee Keun-ho 57' (pen.)	Report	Belfort 45'	Stadium: Incheon Football Stadium; Attendance: 13,264; Referee: Chaiya Mahapab (Thailand)

10 September	South Korea	1–2	Croatia	Jeonju, South Korea
20:00	Lee Keun-ho 90+4'	Report	Vida 64'; Kalinić 71'	Stadium: Jeonju World Cup Stadium; Attendance: 40,723; Referee: Minoru Tōjō (Japan)

12 October	South Korea	0–2	Brazil	Seoul, South Korea
20:00		Report	Neymar 44'; Oscar 49'	Stadium: Seoul World Cup Stadium; Attendance: 65,308; Referee: Ravshan Irmatov (Uzbekistan)

15 October	South Korea	3–1	Mali	Cheonan, South Korea
20:00 UTC+9	Koo Ja-cheol 36' (pen.); Son Heung-min 46'; Kim Bo-kyung 56'	Report	Maïga 27'	Stadium: Cheonan Stadium; Attendance: 26,118; Referee: Yuichi Nishimura (Japan)

15 November	South Korea	2–1	Switzerland	Seoul, South Korea
20:00	Hong Jeong-ho 59'; Lee Chung-yong 87'	Report	Kasami 7'	Stadium: Seoul World Cup Stadium; Attendance: 36,813; Referee: Diego Abal (Argentina)

19 November	South Korea	1–2	Russia	Dubai, United Arab Emirates
18:00	Kim Shin-wook 6'	Report	Smolov 12'; Tarasov 59'	Stadium: Zabeel Stadium; Attendance: 7,000; Referee: Hamad Al Shaikh (United Arab Emirates)

==== Under-23 team ====
29 December	Iran	3–2	South Korea	Kish, Iran
17:30 IRST (UTC+3:30)	Y. Karimi 7'; Sadeghian 9'; K. Rezaei 90'	Report	Lee Jong-ho 12', 74'	Stadium: Kish Stadium, Kish; Referee: Moud Bonyadifar (Iran)

== Leagues ==
=== K League Classic ===
Pos	Team	Pld	W	D	L	GF	GA	GD	Pts	Qualification or relegation
1	Pohang Steelers (C)	38	21	11	6	63	38	+25	74	Qualification for Champions League (Note: Pohang Steelers won the league after qualifying for the Champions League as champions of the FA Cup. Therefore, the spot given to the league champions was passed to the fourth-placed team.)
2	Ulsan Hyundai	38	22	7	9	63	37	+26	73	Qualification for Champions League
3	Jeonbuk Hyundai Motors	38	18	9	11	61	49	+12	63	Qualification for Champions League
4	FC Seoul	38	17	11	10	59	46	+13	62	Qualification for Champions League
5	Suwon Samsung Bluewings	38	15	8	15	50	43	+7	53	
6	Busan IPark	38	14	10	14	43	41	+2	52	
7	Incheon United	38	12	14	12	48	46	+2	50	
8	Seongnam Ilhwa Chunma	38	17	9	12	51	42	+9	60	
9	Jeju United	38	16	10	12	51	46	+5	58	
10	Jeonnam Dragons	38	9	13	16	34	45	−11	40	
11	Gyeongnam FC	38	8	13	17	42	55	−13	37	
12	Gangwon FC (R)	38	8	12	18	37	64	−27	36	Qualification for relegation playoffs
13	Daegu FC (R)	38	6	14	18	38	57	−19	32	Relegation to K League Challenge
14	Daejeon Citizen (R)	38	7	11	20	37	68	−31	32	Relegation to K League Challenge

Source: K League
Rules for classification: 1) Points; 2) Goal difference; 3) Goals scored
(C) Champions; (R) Relegated

=== K League Challenge ===
==== Regular season ====
Pos	Team	Pld	W	D	L	GF	GA	GD	Pts	Qualification
1	Sangju Sangmu (C, O, P)	35	23	8	4	65	31	+34	77	Qualification for promotion playoffs
2	Korean Police	35	20	4	11	60	47	+13	64	
3	Gwangju FC	35	16	5	14	55	54	+1	53	
4	Suwon FC	35	13	8	14	53	51	+2	47	
5	FC Anyang	35	12	9	14	50	51	−1	45	
6	Goyang Hi FC	35	10	11	14	43	50	−7	41	
7	Bucheon FC 1995	35	8	9	18	45	61	−16	33	
8	Chungju Hummel	35	7	8	20	33	59	−26	29	

Source: K League
Rules for classification: 1) Points; 2) Goal difference; 3) Goals scored
(C) Champions; (O) Play-off winners; (P) Promoted

==== Promotion playoffs ====
4 December 2013
19:00

Sangju Sangmu	4–1	Gangwon FC
Lee Sang-hyup 29', 89'; Lee Seung-hyun 71'; Lee Sang-ho 77'		Choi Seung-in 90+2'

Sangju Civic Stadium

7 December 2013
14:00

Gangwon FC	1–0	Sangju Sangmu
Choi Seung-in 71'

Gangneung Stadium

Sangju Sangmu won 4–2 on aggregate and were promoted to the K League Classic, while Gangwon FC were relegated to the K League Challenge.

=== Korea National League ===
==== Regular season ====
Pos	Team	Pld	W	D	L	GF	GA	GD	Pts	Qualification or relegation
1	Hyundai Mipo Dockyard (C)	27	15	6	6	44	25	+19	51	Qualification for playoffs final
2	Incheon Korail	27	12	9	6	42	32	+10	45	Qualification for playoffs semi-final
3	Changwon City	27	10	8	9	30	32	−2	38	Qualification for playoffs first round
4	Gyeongju KHNP	27	9	10	8	29	26	+3	37	Qualification for playoffs first round
5	Gimhae City	27	8	12	7	32	31	+1	36	
6	Mokpo City	27	10	6	11	34	36	−2	36	
7	Busan Transportation Corporation	27	9	7	11	26	29	−3	34	
8	Gangneung City	27	8	9	10	33	36	−3	33	
9	Yongin City	27	8	8	11	37	38	−1	32	
10	Cheonan City	27	6	5	16	29	51	−22	23	

Source: Korea National League
Rules for classification: 1) Points; 2) Goal difference; 3) Goals scored
(C) Champions

==== Championship playoffs ====
First round
3	Changwon City	0	2	2
4	Gyeongju KHNP	2	3	5

Semi-final
2	Incheon Korail	0	1	1
Gyeongju KHNP	1	4	5

Final
Gyeongju KHNP	1	1	2
1	Hyundai Mipo Dockyard (a.e.t.)	1	2	3

=== Challengers League ===
==== Regular season ====
Pos	Team	Pld	W	D	L	GF	GA	GD	Pts	Qualification
1	Pocheon Citizen (C)	25	20	4	1	77	21	+56	64	Qualification for playoffs final
2	Hwaseong FC	25	16	5	4	86	21	+65	53	Qualification for playoffs semi-final
3	Icheon Citizen	25	16	5	4	59	25	+34	53	Qualification for playoffs first round
4	Cheongju Jikji	25	13	7	5	52	31	+21	46	Qualification for playoffs first round
5	Paju Citizen	25	14	4	7	61	37	+24	45	Qualification for playoffs first round
6	Gyeongju Citizen	25	12	5	8	54	32	+22	41	Qualification for playoffs first round
7	Gimpo Citizen	25	13	3	9	50	40	+10	42	
8	Jeonju Citizen	25	12	4	9	47	42	+5	40	
9	Chuncheon FC	25	11	5	9	35	33	+2	38	
10	Seoul United	25	11	3	11	53	54	−1	36	
11	Yeonggwang FC	25	9	8	8	38	38	0	35	
12	Yangju Citizen	25	10	4	11	46	47	−1	34	
13	Cheonan FC	25	9	4	12	45	59	−14	31	
14	Jungnang Chorus Mustang	25	6	4	15	38	68	−30	22	
15	Gwangju Gwangsan	25	6	3	16	27	62	−35	21	
16	Seoul FC Martyrs	25	4	2	19	24	92	−68	14	
17	Goyang Citizen	25	3	2	20	31	74	−43	11	Disqualification from FA Cup
18	Asan United	25	2	4	19	40	87	−47	10	Disqualification from FA Cup

Source: KFA Soccerway
Rules for classification: 1) Points; 2) Goal difference; 3) Goals scored
(C) Champions

==== Championship playoffs ====
First round
3	Icheon Citizen	2 (4)
6	Gyeongju Citizen (p)	2 (5)
4	Cheongju Jikji	1
5	Paju Citizen	3

Second round
Paju Citizen	1
Gyeongju Citizen	0

Semifinal
2	Hwaseong FC	1
Paju Citizen	2

Final
1	Pocheon Citizen	4
Paju Citizen	0

=== WK League ===
==== Regular season ====
Pos	Team	Pld	W	D	L	GF	GA	GD	Pts	Qualification
1	Incheon Hyundai Steel Red Angels (C)	24	15	5	4	44	15	+29	50	Qualification for playoffs final
2	Seoul WFC	24	11	7	6	34	26	+8	40	Qualification for playoffs semi-final
3	Goyang Daekyo Noonnoppi	24	10	9	5	31	20	+11	39	Qualification for playoffs semi-final
4	Jeonbuk KSPO	24	8	6	10	28	38	−10	30	
5	Chungbuk Sportstoto	24	7	8	9	27	34	−7	29	
6	Suwon FMC	24	7	6	11	28	38	−10	27	
7	Busan Sangmu	24	2	7	15	22	43	−21	13	

Source: KWFF
Rules for classification: 1) Points; 2) Goal difference; 3) Goals scored
(C) Champions

==== Championship playoffs ====
Semi-final			Final
			1	Incheon Hyundai Steel Red Angels	1	3	4
2	Seoul WFC	3		Seoul WFC	1	1	2
3	Goyang Daekyo Noonnoppi	2

== Domestic cups ==
=== Korean FA Cup ===
Round of 32
FC Seoul	3
Yonsei University	0
Gwangju FC (a.e.t.)	3
Chungju Hummel	2
Busan IPark	1
Gimhae City	0
Gangwon FC (a.e.t.)	3
Gyeongju KHNP	2
Ulsan Hyundai	3
Icheon Citizen	0
Jeonbuk Hyundai Motors	2
Yongin City	0
Jeonnam Dragons (p)	0 (10)
Gangneung City	0 (9)
Daegu FC	0
Suwon FC	1
Gyeongnam FC	2
Hyundai Mipo Dockyard	0
Daejeon Citizen	0
Goyang Hi FC	1
Seongnam Ilhwa Chunma (a.e.t.)	4
Dong-Eui University	2
Pohang Steelers	4
Soongsil University	0
Jeju United	2
Konkuk University	1
Suwon Samsung Bluewings	2
FC Anyang	1
Incheon United	4
Jeonbuk Maeil	1
Sangju Sangmu	4
Mokpo City	1

Round of 16
FC Seoul (a.e.t.)	2
Gwangju FC	1
Busan IPark	2
Gangwon FC	1
Ulsan Hyundai	0
Jeonbuk Hyundai Motors	1
Jeonnam Dragons	3
Suwon FC	4
Gyeongnam FC	1
Goyang Hi FC	0
Seongnam Ilhwa Chunma	1 (2)
Pohang Steelers (p)	1 (4)
Jeju United	1
Suwon Samsung Bluewings	0
Incheon United (a.e.t.)	2
Sangju Sangmu	1

Quarter-finals
FC Seoul	1
Busan IPark	2
Jeonbuk Hyundai Motors	7
Suwon FC	2
Gyeongnam FC	1
Pohang Steelers	2
Jeju United	2
Incheon United	0

Semi-finals
15 September – Busan
Busan IPark	1
Jeonbuk Hyundai Motors	3
14 September – Seogwipo
Pohang Steelers	4
Jeju United	2

Final
19 October – Jeonju
Jeonbuk Hyundai Motors	1 (3)
Pohang Steelers (p)	1 (4)

=== Korea National League Championship ===
==== Group stage ====
Group A
Pos	Team	Pld	Pts
1	Gangneung City	4	8
2	Cheonan City	4	6
3	Gyeongju KHNP	4	6
4	Gimhae City	4	4
5	Yongin City	4	2

Group B
Pos	Team	Pld	Pts
1	Mokpo City	4	10
2	Incheon Korail	4	7
3	Changwon City	4	4
4	Hyundai Mipo Dockyard	4	4
5	Busan Transportation Corporation	4	2

==== Knockout stage ====
Semifinals
Gangneung City	1
Incheon Korail	2
Mokpo City	0 (3)
Cheonan City (p)	0 (4)

Final
Incheon Korail	5
Cheonan City	0

== International cups ==
=== AFC Champions League ===
Team	Result	Round	Aggregate	Score	Venue	Opponent
FC Seoul	Runners-up	Group E	Winners	5–1	Home	(China) Jiangsu Sainty
FC Seoul	Runners-up	Group E	Winners	2–0	Away	(China) Jiangsu Sainty
FC Seoul	Runners-up	Group E	Winners	0–0	Away	(Thailand) Buriram United
FC Seoul	Runners-up	Group E	Winners	2–2	Home	(Thailand) Buriram United
FC Seoul	Runners-up	Group E	Winners	2–1	Home	(Japan) Vegalta Sendai
FC Seoul	Runners-up	Group E	Winners	0–1	Away	(Japan) Vegalta Sendai
FC Seoul	Runners-up	Round of 16	3–1	0–0	Away	(China) Beijing Guoan
FC Seoul	Runners-up	Round of 16	3–1	3–1	Home	(China) Beijing Guoan
FC Seoul	Runners-up	Quarter-finals	2–1	1–1	Away	(Saudi Arabia) Al-Ahli
FC Seoul	Runners-up	Quarter-finals	2–1	1–0	Home	(Saudi Arabia) Al-Ahli
FC Seoul	Runners-up	Semi-finals	4–2	2–0	Home	(Iran) Esteghlal
FC Seoul	Runners-up	Semi-finals	4–2	2–2	Away	(Iran) Esteghlal
FC Seoul	Runners-up	Final	3–3 (a)	2–2	Home	(China) Guangzhou Evergrande
FC Seoul	Runners-up	Final	3–3 (a)	1–1	Away	(China) Guangzhou Evergrande
Jeonbuk Hyundai Motors	Round of 16	Group F	Runners-up	2–2	Away	(Thailand) Muangthong United
Jeonbuk Hyundai Motors	Round of 16	Group F	Runners-up	2–0	Home	(Thailand) Muangthong United
Jeonbuk Hyundai Motors	Round of 16	Group F	Runners-up	1–1	Home	(China) Guangzhou Evergrande
Jeonbuk Hyundai Motors	Round of 16	Group F	Runners-up	0–0	Away	(China) Guangzhou Evergrande
Jeonbuk Hyundai Motors	Round of 16	Group F	Runners-up	3–1	Away	(Japan) Urawa Red Diamonds
Jeonbuk Hyundai Motors	Round of 16	Group F	Runners-up	2–2	Home	(Japan) Urawa Red Diamonds
Jeonbuk Hyundai Motors	Round of 16	Round of 16	2–5	0–2	Home	(Japan) Kashiwa Reysol
Jeonbuk Hyundai Motors	Round of 16	Round of 16	2–5	2–3	Away	(Japan) Kashiwa Reysol
Pohang Steelers	Group stage	Group G	Third place	0–0	Home	(China) Beijing Guoan
Pohang Steelers	Group stage	Group G	Third place	0–2	Away	(China) Beijing Guoan
Pohang Steelers	Group stage	Group G	Third place	2–2	Away	(Uzbekistan) Bunyodkor
Pohang Steelers	Group stage	Group G	Third place	1–1	Home	(Uzbekistan) Bunyodkor
Pohang Steelers	Group stage	Group G	Third place	1–0	Away	(Japan) Sanfrecce Hiroshima
Pohang Steelers	Group stage	Group G	Third place	1–1	Home	(Japan) Sanfrecce Hiroshima
Suwon Samsung Bluewings	Group stage	Group H	Fourth place	0–0	Away	(Australia) Central Coast Mariners
Suwon Samsung Bluewings	Group stage	Group H	Fourth place	0–1	Home	(Australia) Central Coast Mariners
Suwon Samsung Bluewings	Group stage	Group H	Fourth place	0–0	Home	(China) Guizhou Renhe
Suwon Samsung Bluewings	Group stage	Group H	Fourth place	2–2	Away	(China) Guizhou Renhe
Suwon Samsung Bluewings	Group stage	Group H	Fourth place	2–6	Home	(Japan) Kashiwa Reysol
Suwon Samsung Bluewings	Group stage	Group H	Fourth place	0–0	Away	(Japan) Kashiwa Reysol

== See also ==
- Football in South Korea
