= Hwang Ho-lyeong =

South Korean footballer (born 1984)

Hwang Ho-Lyeong
Personal information
- Date of birth: October 15, 1984 (age 42)
- Place of birth: South Korea
- Height: 1.76 m (5 ft 9 in)
- Position: Attacking midfielder

Team information
- Current team: Gyeongju KHNP FC
- Number: 7

Youth career
- Dongguk University

Senior career*
Years	Team	Apps	(Gls)
2007–2009	Jeju United	6	(0)
2010–2011	Cheonan City FC	48	(17)
2012	Goyang Kookmin Bank FC	22	(3)
2013–	Gyeongju KHNP FC	16	(2)
- * Club domestic league appearances and goals as of 30 December 2013

Hwang Ho-Lyeong (born 15 October 1984) is a South Korean footballer who plays for Gyeongju KHNP FC in the Korea National League.

== Career ==
Hwang began his playing career with Jeju United in 2007. He was picked as the first player of Jeju United in the draft and it was his first challenge to K-League after he tried to enter European clubs leagues such as Ligue 1, Belgian Pro League, and Major League Soccer.

=== Club career statistics ===
As of 30 December 2013.

Club performance			League		Cup		League Cup		Total	
Season	Club	League	Apps	Goals	Apps	Goals	Apps	Goals	Apps	Goals
South Korea			League		KFA Cup		League Cup		Total	
2007	Jeju United	K-League	1	0	0	0	2	0	3	0
2008	Jeju United	K-League	0	0	0	0	2	0	2	0
2009	Jeju United	K-League	1	0	0	0	0	0	1	0
South Korea			League		KFA Cup		League Cup		Total	
2010	Cheonan City	Korea National League	14	6	2	0	3	0	19	6
2011	Cheonan City	Korea National League	25	10	1	1	3	0	29	11
2012	Goyang Kookmin Bank	Korea National League	18	1	1	1	3	1	22	3
2013	Gyeongju KHNP	Korea National League	11	0	2	1	3	1	16	2
Total	South Korea		70	17	6	3	16	2	92	22
Career total			70	17	6	3	16	2	92	22
