= Park Dae-han =

Park Dae-han (Korean: 박대한) is a Korean name consisting of the family name Park (박) and the given name Dae-han (대한). It may refer to:

- Park Dae-han (footballer, born 1991), South Korean footballer
- Park Dae-han (footballer, born 1996), South Korean footballer
