= Kim Seo-jun =

Kim Seo-jun or Gim Seo-jun (Korean: 김서준) may refer to:

- Kim Seo-jun (footballer) (born 1989), South Korean footballer
- Kim Seo-jun (sport shooter) (born 1990), South Korean sport shooter
