= Park Bae-jong =

South Korean footballer

Personal information
- Full name: Park Bae-jong
- Date of birth: 23 October 1989 (age 37)
- Place of birth: South Korea
- Height: 1.84 m (6 ft 1/2 in)
- Position: Goalkeeper

Team information
- Current team: Suwon FC
- Number: 1

Youth career
- 2008–2011: Kwangwoon University

Senior career*
Years	Team	Apps	(Gls)
2012–	Suwon FC	136	(0)
2017–2018	→ Asan Mugunghwa (army)	52	(1)
- * Club domestic league appearances and goals as of 29 March 2022

Park Bae-jong (Korean: 박배종; born 23 October 1989) is a South Korean footballer who plays as goalkeeper for Suwon FC in K League 1.

== Career ==
Park signed with Korea National League side Suwon FC in 2012.

In 2013, he and his team took part in the second division K League Challenge. He made his professional debut in the league match against FC Anyang on 28 April 2013.

== Career statistics ==
As of 12 November 2023

Club	Season	League			Cup		Continental		Other		Total	
Club	Season	Division	Apps	Goals	Apps	Goals	Apps	Goals	Apps	Goals	Apps	Goals
Suwon FC	2012	Korea National League	9	0	0	0	—		—		9	0
Suwon FC	2013	K League 2	16	0	2	0	—		—		18	0
Suwon FC	2014	K League 2	18	0	2	0	—		—		20	0
Suwon FC	2015	K League 2	20	0	0	0	—		4	0	24	0
Suwon FC	2016	K League 1	12	0	1	0	—		—		13	0
Suwon FC	2018	K League 2	3	0	0	0	—		—		3	0
Suwon FC	2019	K League 2	28	0	2	0	—		—		30	0
Suwon FC	2020	K League 2	11	0	3	0	—		0	0	14	0
Suwon FC	2021	K League 1	16	0	0	0	—		—		16	0
Suwon FC	2022	K League 1	25	0	0	0	—		—		25	0
Suwon FC	2023	K League 1	12	0	1	0	—		0	0	13	0
Suwon FC	Total		170	0	11	0	0	0	4	0	185	0
Asan Mugunghwa (army)	2017	K League 2	33	1	0	0	—		2	0	35	1
Asan Mugunghwa (army)	2018	K League 2	17	0	0	0	—		—		17	0
Asan Mugunghwa (army)	Total		50	1	0	0	0	0	2	0	52	1
Career total			220	1	11	0	0	0	6	0	237	1
