= Choi Kyu-baek =

South Korean footballer (born 1994)

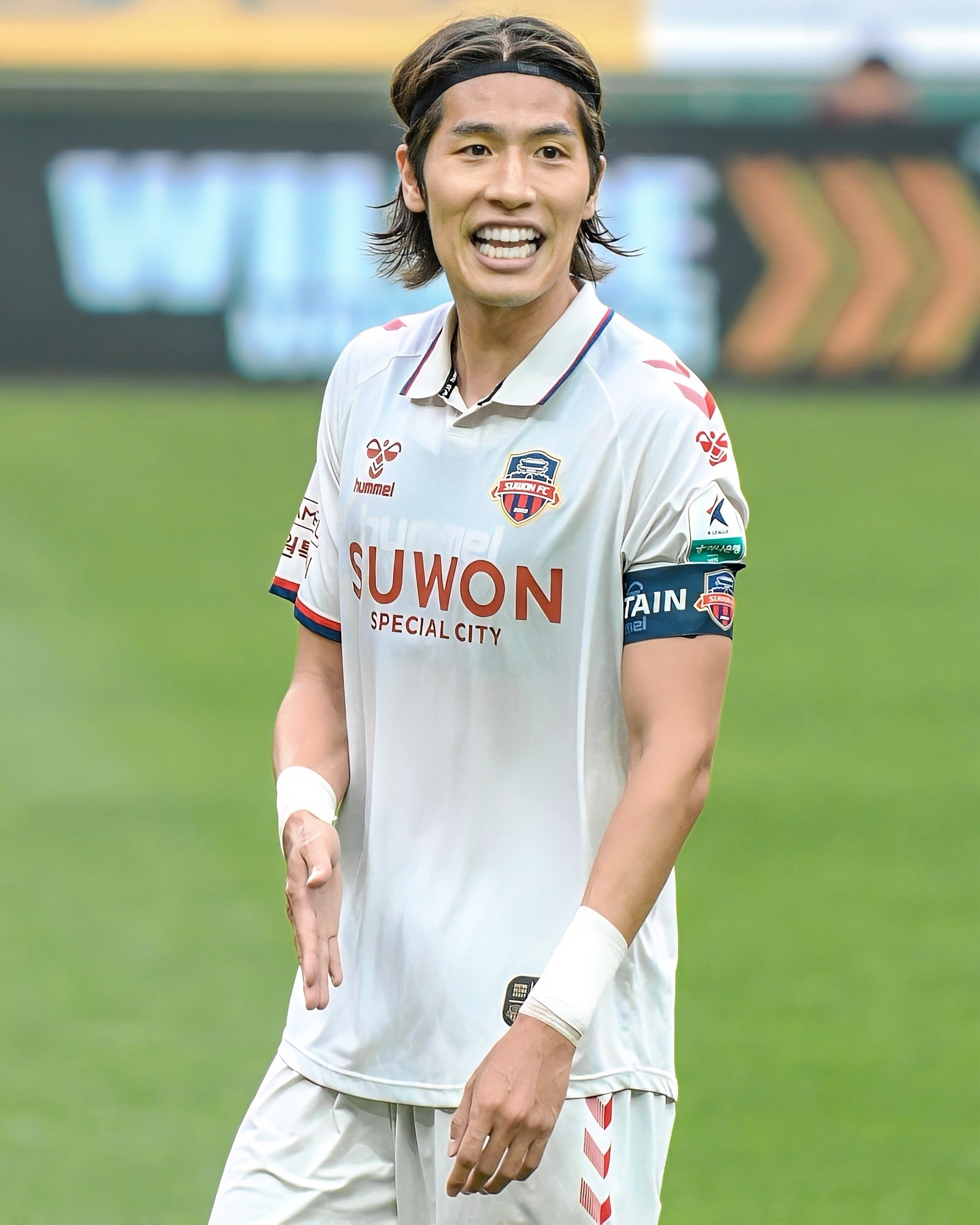
- Choi in 2025

Personal information
- Date of birth: 23 January 1994 (age 32)
- Place of birth: South Korea
- Height: 1.88 m (6 ft 2 in)
- Position: Centre back

Team information
- Current team: Cheonan City FC
- Number: 6

Youth career
- 2012–2015: Daegu University

Senior career*
Years	Team	Apps	(Gls)
2016	Jeonbuk Hyundai	15	(1)
2017	Ulsan Hyundai	11	(0)
2018–2019	V-Varen Nagasaki	18	(1)
2019	→ Jeju United (loan)	8	(0)
2020	Suwon FC	9	(1)
2021–2023	Chungnam Asan FC	19	(1)
2023–2024	Daejeon Korail FC	16	(0)
2024–2025	Suwon FC	51	(2)
2026–	Cheonan City FC	18	(0)

International career
2015–2016	South Korea U23	3	(0)
- * Club domestic league appearances and goals as of 6 August 2026

- Choi Kyu-baek
- Hangul: 최규백
- Hanja: 崔圭伯
- RR: Choe Gyubaek
- MR: Ch'oe Kyubaek

Choi Kyu-baek (Korean: 최규백; born 23 January 1994) is a South Korean footballer who plays as centre back for Cheonan City FC.

== Career ==
Choi joined Jeonbuk Hyundai in January 2016. He made his professional debut in the Champions League game against Bình Dương on 15 March.

Choi was included in the final player list of Rio Olympic (South Korea U-23). He played 3 games against Fiji, Germany and Honduras.

On 14 December 2016, he was traded from Jeonbuk to Ulsan Hyundai FC with Kim Chang-soo and Lee Jong-ho.
