= Lee Kwang-jun =

South Korean footballer (born 1996)

Personal information
- Date of birth: 6 January 1996 (age 30)
- Place of birth: South Korea
- Height: 1.91 m (6 ft 3 in)
- Position: Centre-back

Team information
- Current team: Cheonan City FC
- Number: 3

Youth career
- –2014: Pohang Steelers
- 2015–2017: Dankook University
- 2018–2019: Pohang Steelers

Senior career*
Years	Team	Apps	(Gls)
2019–2023	Pohang Steelers	23	(0)
2019	→ Daejeon Hana Citizen (loan)	0	(0)
2020	→ Gimhae (loan)	17	(3)
2023–	Cheonan City FC	27	(1)
2024–2025	→ Jinju Citizen FC (loan)		
- * Club domestic league appearances and goals as of 6 August 2026

- Lee Kwang-jun
- Hangul: 이광준
- Hanja: 李侊俊
- RR: I Gwangjun
- MR: I Kwangjun

Lee Kwang-jun (Korean: 이광준; born 6 January 1996) is a South Korean footballer currently playing as a centre-back for Cheonan City FC.

== Career statistics ==
=== Club ===
As of 28 August 2021.

Club	Season	League			Cup		Continental		Other		Total	
Club	Season	Division	Apps	Goals	Apps	Goals	Apps	Goals	Apps	Goals	Apps	Goals
Dankook University	2015	–			1	0	–		0	0	1	0
Pohang Steelers	2019	K League 1	0	0	0	0	0	0	0	0	0	0
Pohang Steelers	2020	K League 1	0	0	0	0	0	0	0	0	0	0
Pohang Steelers	2021	K League 1	14	0	2	0	2 (Note: Appearances in the AFC Champions League)	0	0	0	18	0
Pohang Steelers	Total		14	0	2	0	2	0	0	0	18	0
Daejeon Hana Citizen (loan)	2019	K League 2	0	0	0	0	–		0	0	0	0
Gimhae (loan)	2020	K3 League	17	3	2	0	–		2 (Note: Appearances in the K3 League championship playoffs)	0	12	0
Career total			31	3	5	0	2	0	0	0	38	3
