= Ka Sol-hyun =

South Korean footballer (born 1991)

Personal information
- Full name: Ka Sol-hyun
- Date of birth: 12 February 1991 (age 35)
- Place of birth: South Korea
- Height: 1.92 m (6 ft 4 in)
- Position: Centre-back

Youth career
- Korea University

Senior career*
Years	Team	Apps	(Gls)
2013–2016	FC Anyang	92	(5)
2017	Gyeongju KHNP	19	(2)
2018–2020	Jeonnam Dragons	45	(0)
2020	Gangwon FC	0	(0)
2021–2022	Gyeongju KHNP	40	(0)
2022–2023	Mesaimeer	22	(0)
- * Club domestic league appearances and goals

Ka Sol-hyun (Korean: 가솔현; born 12 February 1991) is a South Korean footballer who plays as a defender.

== Career ==
Ka was selected by FC Anyang in the 2013 K League draft.
