= Yoon Yong-ho =

South Korean footballer

Personal information
- Date of birth: 6 March 1996 (age 30)
- Place of birth: South Korea
- Height: 1.75 m (5 ft 9 in)
- Position: Midfielder

Team information
- Current team: Cheonan City FC
- Number: 8

Youth career
- 2012–2014: Maetan High School
- 2015–2016: Hanyang University

Senior career*
Years	Team	Apps	(Gls)
2017–2018	Suwon Samsung Bluewings	8	(1)
2019	Daejeon Citizen	12	(1)
2019	→ Jeonnam Dragons (Loan)	6	(1)
2020	Seongnam FC	5	(0)
2021	Incheon United FC	0	(0)
2021–	Cheonan City FC	76	(13)

International career^{‡}
2011–2012	South Korea U-17	6	(0)
2018–	South Korea U-23	0	(0)
- * Club domestic league appearances and goals as of October 21, 2022 ‡ National team caps and goals as of March 13, 2018

- Yoon Yong-ho
- Hangul: 윤용호
- RR: Yun Yongho
- MR: Yun Yongho

Yoon Yong-ho (Korean: 윤용호; born 6 March 1996) is a South Korean football midfielder who plays for Cheonan City FC.

He started his career at Suwon Bluewings before joining Daejeon Citizen on a free transfer during the spring of 2019.

In the summer of 2019, he joined Jeonnam Dragons on loan until the end of the 2019 K League 2 season.

In 2020, he joined Seongnam FC of K League 1.
