= 2012 Korea National League =

Shinhan Bank Korea National League
- Season: 2012
- Dates: 10 March – 3 November 2012
- Champions: Incheon Korail (2nd title)
- Matches: 188
- Goals: 474 (2.52 per match)
- Best Player: Lee Seung-hwan
- Top goalscorer: Lee Jae-min; Ko Kyung-min (12 goals each)

The 2012 Korea National League was the tenth season of the Korea National League, which was at the time the second-highest division of the South Korean football league system.

== Teams ==
Locations of the 2012 Korea National League clubs

Team	Location	Stadium	Foreign players
Ansan H FC	Ansan	Ansan Wa~ Stadium	
Busan Transportation Corporation	Busan	Busan Gudeok Stadium	
Changwon City	Changwon	Changwon Football Center	
Cheonan City	Cheonan	Cheonan Stadium	
Chungju Hummel	Chungju	Chungju Stadium	
Daejeon KHNP	Daejeon	Daejeon Hanbat Stadium	
Gangneung City	Gangneung	Gangneung Stadium	
Gimhae City	Gimhae	Gimhae Stadium	
Goyang KB Kookmin Bank	Goyang	Goyang Stadium; Uijeongbu Stadium	(China) Bai Zijian
Hyundai Mipo Dockyard	Ulsan	Ulsan Stadium	(Brazil) Roni da Silva (Brazil) Thiago Santos
Incheon Korail	Incheon	Incheon Munhak Stadium	
Mokpo City	Mokpo	Mokpo International Football Center	
Suwon City	Suwon	Suwon Sports Complex; Suwon World Cup Stadium auxiliary pitch	
Yongin City	Yongin	Yongin Football Center	

== Regular season ==
=== League table ===
Pos	Team	Pld	W	D	L	GF	GA	GD	Pts	Qualification or relegation
1	Goyang KB Kookmin Bank	26	15	10	1	51	20	+31	55	Qualification for the playoffs final
2	Hyundai Mipo Dockyard	26	15	4	7	61	30	+31	49	Qualification for the playoffs semi-final
3	Gangneung City	26	14	5	7	32	21	+11	47	Qualification for the playoffs first round
4	Changwon City	26	14	4	8	36	30	+6	46	Qualification for the playoffs first round
5	Incheon Korail	26	12	6	8	39	30	+9	42	Qualification for the playoffs first round
6	Yongin City	26	12	6	8	37	35	+2	42	Qualification for the playoffs first round
7	Busan Transportation Corporation	26	11	8	7	28	23	+5	41	
8	Mokpo City	26	10	6	10	28	37	−9	36	
9	Suwon City (P)	26	9	7	10	29	32	−3	34	Promotion to the K League Challenge
10	Ansan H FC (P)	26	8	8	10	25	34	−9	32	Promotion to the K League Challenge
11	Gimhae City	26	6	10	10	26	34	−8	28	
12	Chungju Hummel (P)	26	5	6	15	20	34	−14	21	Promotion to the K League Challenge
13	Cheonan City	26	6	1	19	25	45	−20	19	
14	Daejeon KHNP	26	3	3	20	22	54	−32	12	

Source: Korea National League (in Korean)
Rules for classification: 1) Points; 2) Goal difference; 3) Goals scored.
(P) Promoted

=== Results ===
Home \ Away	ASH	BTC	CWC	CAC	CJH	DHN	GNC	GHC	GKB	HMD	ICK	MPC	SWC	YIC
Ansan H FC	—	1–0	1–3	3–1	3–1	1–0	0–2	2–1	1–1	0–2	1–0	1–2	2–2	0–1
Busan Transportation Corporation	0–0	—	1–0	2–1	2–0	3–2	0–1	2–0	2–2	1–0	1–0	1–0	0–0	1–1
Changwon City	0–0	3–2	—	3–1	2–1	0–0	2–1	0–1	3–1	1–3	4–3	0–2	0–2	1–1
Cheonan City	1–3	0–2	0–1	—	1–2	2–0	1–2	1–0	1–0	0–1	3–5	1–1	1–2	0–1
Chungju Hummel	0–0	0–1	0–0	2–3	—	0–1	0–1	0–0	1–2	0–1	1–0	1–0	1–2	1–2
Daejeon KHNP	1–2	2–1	1–2	1–2	1–2	—	1–2	1–1	0–6	1–5	0–1	2–2	0–1	2–3
Gangneung City	2–2	0–0	0–1	2–1	2–0	1–0	—	0–1	0–0	0–2	3–1	3–0	1–1	3–0
Gimhae City	1–1	0–0	1–2	1–0	2–3	3–2	0–0	—	0–2	1–1	2–1	2–3	1–1	3–2
Goyang KB Kookmin Bank	2–0	1–1	3–0	3–1	1–0	3–0	3–0	2–1	—	1–1	3–3	3–0	1–1	1–1
Hyundai Mipo Dockyard	5–0	4–2	2–1	2–0	1–1	3–1	1–2	4–1	3–3	—	1–2	4–0	4–0	4–0
Incheon Korail	2–1	2–1	1–2	2–0	2–0	2–0	0–1	1–1	0–0	2–1	—	1–1	1–0	4–1
Mokpo City	2–0	0–0	1–3	0–1	0–0	3–2	2–1	1–0	0–2	4–3	1–1	—	1–0	0–2
Suwon City	2–0	3–1	0–2	2–1	2–1	0–1	0–1	2–2	0–1	3–1	0–0	1–2	—	1–2
Yongin City	0–0	0–1	1–0	1–2	2–2	3–0	2–1	0–0	1–3	3–2	1–2	2–0	4–1	—

Source: Korea National League (in Korean)
Legend: Blue = home team win; Yellow = draw; Red = away team win.

== Championship playoffs ==
=== Bracket ===
First round
3	Gangneung City	0 (2)
6	Yongin City (p)	0 (4)
4	Changwon City	0
5	Incheon Korail	2

Second round
Yongin City	1
Incheon Korail	3

Semifinal
2	Hyundai Mipo Dockyard	1
Incheon Korail	2

Final
1	Goyang KB	0	2	2
Incheon Korail (a.e.t.)	1	3	4

=== First round ===
3 November 2012
15:00 KST

Gangneung City	0–0 (a.e.t.)	Yongin City
	Report
Penalties
Ahn Sung-hoon (penalty missed); Kim Jin-seok (penalty missed); Lee Hyun-chang (penalty scored); Lee Joon-hyub (penalty scored)	2–4	(penalty scored) Choi Hyun-bin; (penalty scored) Lee Kyung-sik; (penalty missed) Um Kang-ho; (penalty scored) Ji Ho-chul; (penalty scored) Ko Kyung-min

Gangneung Stadium, Gangneung
Attendance: 500
Referee: Jung Dong-sik

3 November 2012
15:00 KST

Changwon City	0–2	Incheon Korail
	Report	Kim Tae-wook 43'; Woo Joo-young 82'

Changwon Football Center, Changwon
Attendance: 300
Referee: Choi Dae-woo

=== Second round ===
7 November 2012
19:00 KST

Yongin City	1–3	Incheon Korail
Ko Kyung-min 90+2'	Report	Kim Tae-wook 14', 60'; Ahn Jung-goo 19'

Incheon Munhak Stadium, Incheon
Attendance: 200
Referee: Kim Hee-gon

=== Semi-final ===
10 November 2012
15:00 KST

Hyundai Mipo Dockyard	1–2	Incheon Korail
Kim Byung-oh 26'	Report	Lee Seung-hwan 80'; Lee Keun-won 90'

Ulsan Stadium, Ulsan
Attendance: 1,100
Referee: Jung Dong-sik

=== Final ===
14 November 2012
19:00 KST

Incheon Korail	1–0	Goyang KB Kookmin Bank
Kim Hyung-woon 80'	Report

Incheon Munhak Stadium, Incheon
Attendance: 2,100
Referee: Choi Dae-woo

17 November 2012
15:00 KST

Goyang KB Kookmin Bank	2–3 (a.e.t.)	Incheon Korail
Kim Young-nam 33'; Ha Jung-heon 120+2'	Report	Lee Seung-hwan 105+1', 111'; Lee Geun-won 113'

Goyang Stadium, Goyang
Referee: Kim Hee-gon

== See also ==
- 2012 in South Korean football
- 2012 Korea National League Championship
- 2012 Korean FA Cup
