= Lee Ji-seung =

Korean association football player

Personal information
- Date of birth: 11 January 1999 (age 27)
- Place of birth: South Korea
- Height: 1.77 m (5 ft 10 in)
- Position: Midfielder

Team information
- Current team: Cheonan City FC
- Number: 17

Senior career*
Years	Team	Apps	(Gls)
2019	Ulsan Hyundai	0	(0)
2020–2021	Busan IPark	13	(0)
2022–2023	Gyeongnam FC	19	(0)
2024–2025	Ansan Greeners	32	(2)
2025	Chungbuk Cheongju FC	21	(0)
2026–	Cheonan City FC	7	(0)

International career^{‡}
2020	South Korea U21	0	(0)
Medal record
Men's football
Representing South Korea
FIFA U-20 World Cup
Runner-up	2019 Poland
- * Club domestic league appearances and goals as of 6 August 2026 ‡ National team caps and goals as of 17 February 2021

Lee Ji-seung (Korean: 이지승; born 11 January 1999) is a South Korean professional footballer who plays as a midfielder for Cheonan City FC.

== Career ==
Lee joined Busan IPark from Ulsan Hyundai and made his debut for the club in an FA Cup game with Hwaseong FC on 1 July 2020. He went on to make two further appearances in the cup that year. After his contract with the club expired at the end of 2020, Lee signed a new contract to stay with the club into the 2021 season.

== Career statistics ==
=== Club ===
As of 20 February 2022.

Club	Season	League			Cup		Other		Total	
Club	Season	Division	Apps	Goals	Apps	Goals	Apps	Goals	Apps	Goals
Busan IPark	2020	K League 1	1	0	3	0	0	0	4	0
Busan IPark	2021	K League 2	12	0	2	0	0	0	14	0
Gyeongnam FC	2022	K League 2	1	0	0	0	0	0	1	0
Career total			14	0	5	0	0	0	19	0
