= Park Ju-won (footballer) =

South Korean footballer

Personal information
- Date of birth: 19 October 1990 (age 36)
- Place of birth: South Korea
- Height: 1.91 m (6 ft 3 in)
- Position: Goalkeeper

Team information
- Current team: Cheonan City FC
- Number: 1

Youth career
- 2009–2012: Hongik University

Senior career*
Years	Team	Apps	(Gls)
2013–2021	Daejeon Citizen	98	(0)
2017–2018	→ Asan Mugunghwa (army)	14	(0)
2022–2023	Chungnam Asan FC	42	(0)
2024	Jeonnam Dragons	0	(0)
2024	→ Cheonan City FC (loan)	12	(0)
2025–	Cheonan City FC	14	(0)
- * Club domestic league appearances and goals as of 7 January 2026

Park Ju-won (Korean: 박주원; born 19 October 1990) is a South Korean footballer who plays as a goalkeeper for Cheonan City FC in K League 2.

== Career ==
Daejeon Citizen selected him in the 2013 K League draft. He made his debut in the FA Cup match against Mokpo City on 9 April 2014.

In 2022, he left Daejeon Hana Citizen and joined Chungnam Asan FC.
