= Ko Tae-won =

South Korean footballer (born 1993)

Personal information
- Full name: Ko Tae-won
- Date of birth: 10 May 1993 (age 33)
- Place of birth: South Korea
- Height: 1.87 m (6 ft 1 1/2 in)
- Position: Centre-back

Team information
- Current team: Cheonan City FC
- Number: 5

Youth career
- 2012–2015: Honam University

Senior career*
Years	Team	Apps	(Gls)
2016–2025	Jeonnam Dragons	166	(7)
2018–2019	→ Sangju Sangmu (army)	7	(0)
2026–	Cheonan City FC	3	(0)
- * Club domestic league appearances and goals as of 6 August 2026

Ko Tae-won (Korean: 고태원; born 10 May 1993) is a South Korean footballer who plays as a centre-back for Cheonan City FC.

== Career ==
Ko joined K League 1 side Jeonnam Dragons in January 2016.
