= Song Han-ki =

South Korean footballer

Song Han-Ki
Personal information
- Full name: Song Han-Ki
- Date of birth: August 7, 1988 (age 38)
- Place of birth: South Korea
- Height: 1.86 m (6 ft 1 in)
- Position: Defender

Team information
- Current team: Gyeongju Korea Hydro & Nuclear Power FC
- Number: 5

Senior career*
Years	Team	Apps	(Gls)
2011	Shonan Bellmare		
2012	Yongin City		
2012	Goyang KB		
2013	Gyeongju KHNP	11	(0)
2014	Kamatamare Sanuki	13	(0)
2015	Goyang Hi FC		
2016–	Gyeongju Korea Hydro & Nuclear Power FC		
- * Club domestic league appearances and goals

Song Han-Ki (Korean: 송한기, born August 7, 1988) is a South Korean football player.

== Club statistics ==
Club performance			League		Cup		Total	
Season	Club	League	Apps	Goals	Apps	Goals	Apps	Goals
Japan			League		Emperor's Cup		Total	
2011	Shonan Bellmare	J2 League	1	0	0	0	1	0
Country	Japan		1	0	0	0	1	0
Total			1	0	0	0	1	0
