= Seok Dong-woo =

South Korean footballer

Personal information
- Full name: Seok Dong-woo
- Date of birth: 27 May 1990 (age 36)
- Place of birth: South Korea
- Height: 1.75 m (5 ft 9 in)
- Position: Defender

Team information
- Current team: Bucheon FC 1995
- Number: 34

Youth career
- Yongin University

Senior career*
Years	Team	Apps	(Gls)
2014–	Bucheon FC	17	(0)
- * Club domestic league appearances and goals as of 15 December 2015

Seok Dong-woo (Korean: 석동우; born 27 May 1990) is a South Korean footballer who plays as defender for Bucheon FC 1995 in K League Challenge.

== Career ==
Park was selected by Bucheon FC in the 2014 K League draft.
