= 2013 Korea National League =

Shinhan Bank Korea National League
- Season: 2013
- Dates: 9 March – 23 November 2013
- Champions: Hyundai Mipo Dockyard (4th title)
- Matches: 141
- Goals: 354 (2.51 per match)
- Best Player: Kim Ho-you
- Top goalscorer: Lee Jun-hyeob (13 goals)

The 2013 Korea National League was the eleventh season of the Korea National League. A total of ten clubs participated in this season after four clubs were dropped out from the league. Three of these four clubs—Ansan H FC (Goyang Hi FC), Suwon City (Suwon FC), and Chungju Hummel—started to participate in a new professional league K League 2. The fourth club's sponsor, Kookmin Bank, decided to dissolve their club Goyang KB Kookmin Bank and sponsor K League 2 club FC Anyang. The post-season playoffs were contested by four teams.

== Teams ==
Locations of the 2013 Korea National League clubs

Team	Location	Stadium
Busan Transportation Corporation	Busan	Busan Gudeok Stadium
Changwon City	Changwon	Changwon Football Center
Cheonan City	Cheonan	Cheonan Stadium
Gangneung City	Gangneung	Gangneung Stadium
Gimhae City	Gimhae	Gimhae Stadium
Gyeongju KHNP	Gyeongju	Gyeongju Civic Stadium
Hyundai Mipo Dockyard	Ulsan	Ulsan Stadium
Incheon Korail	Incheon	Incheon Munhak Stadium
Mokpo City	Mokpo	Mokpo International Football Center
Yongin City	Yongin	Yongin Football Center

== Regular season ==
=== League table ===
Pos	Team	Pld	W	D	L	GF	GA	GD	Pts	Qualification or relegation
1	Hyundai Mipo Dockyard	27	15	6	6	44	25	+19	51	Qualification for the playoffs final
2	Incheon Korail	27	12	9	6	42	32	+10	45	Qualification for the playoffs semi-final
3	Changwon City	27	10	8	9	30	32	−2	38	Qualification for the playoffs first round
4	Gyeongju KHNP	27	9	10	8	29	26	+3	37	Qualification for the playoffs first round
5	Gimhae City	27	8	12	7	32	31	+1	36	
6	Mokpo City	27	10	6	11	34	36	−2	36	
7	Busan Transportation Corporation	27	9	7	11	26	29	−3	34	
8	Gangneung City	27	8	9	10	33	36	−3	33	
9	Yongin City	27	8	8	11	37	38	−1	32	
10	Cheonan City	27	6	5	16	29	51	−22	23	

Source: Korea National League
Rules for classification: 1) Points; 2) Goal difference; 3) Goals scored.

=== Positions by matchday ===
Team ╲ Round	1	2	3	4	5	6	7	8	9	10	11	12	13	14	15	16	17	18	19	20	21	22	23	24	25	26	27
Ulsan Hyundai Mipo Dolphin	9	8	8	9	7	8	5	6	3	3	3	4	4	6	3	3	2	2	1	2	1	1	1	1	1	1	1
Incheon Korail	10	4	6	6	4	4	2	2	2	2	2	1	1	1	1	1	1	1	2	1	2	2	2	2	2	2	2
Changwon City	6	8	8	8	9	10	10	9	10	10	10	10	9	9	9	9	9	9	9	9	9	9	9	9	6	4	3
Gyeongju KHNP	4	5	5	3	2	2	3	3	4	4	4	3	3	4	2	2	3	3	4	5	5	5	5	6	7	5	4
Gimhae City	2	3	3	4	6	6	6	7	7	7	7	8	8	8	7	7	8	8	8	6	6	6	6	4	4	6	5
Mokpo City	8	5	4	5	3	5	7	4	8	8	8	7	6	5	8	8	7	4	5	3	3	3	3	3	3	3	6
Busan Transportation Corporation	4	7	7	10	10	9	8	8	6	6	6	5	5	3	5	4	4	6	3	4	7	7	8	8	9	7	7
Gangneung City	1	2	1	1	1	1	1	1	1	1	1	2	2	2	4	5	6	7	7	7	8	8	7	7	8	9	8
Yongin City	3	1	2	2	5	3	4	5	5	5	5	6	7	7	6	6	5	5	6	8	4	4	4	5	5	8	9
Cheonan City	6	10	10	7	8	7	9	10	9	9	9	9	10	10	10	10	10	10	10	10	10	10	10	10	10	10	10

Source: Korea National League
= Leaders; = Qualification for the playoffs

=== Results ===
==== Matches 1–18 ====
Home \ Away	BTC	CWC	CAC	GNC	GHC	GHN	HMD	ICK	MPC	YIC
Busan Transportation Corporation	—	2–1	0–2	2–3	1–2	2–2	0–0	1–1	0–1	3–0
Changwon City	0–0	—	1–2	0–1	1–0	1–1	2–1	1–0	1–2	2–1
Cheonan City	1–0	1–1	—	0–2	2–1	0–0	0–4	1–2	0–2	3–3
Gangneung City	3–0	0–0	2–1	—	3–3	1–0	1–1	0–0	1–2	2–0
Gimhae City	1–0	0–1	2–1	1–1	—	0–0	0–1	0–0	0–0	2–2
Gyeongju KHNP	1–2	1–2	3–1	1–1	1–0	—	0–0	1–2	1–0	1–0
Hyundai Mipo Dockyard	2–0	3–2	2–1	1–0	3–2	1–2	—	2–2	1–2	0–1
Incheon Korail	1–2	0–0	5–2	1–3	0–0	4–3	1–2	—	3–0	2–1
Mokpo City	0–1	0–2	1–1	2–2	2–3	0–1	1–1	1–1	—	0–1
Yongin City	0–1	1–1	4–1	5–0	2–1	0–2	0–3	3–3	1–1	—

Source: Korea National League (in Korean)
Legend: Blue = home team win; Yellow = draw; Red = away team win.

==== Matches 19–27 ====
Home \ Away	BTC	CWC	CAC	GNC	GHC	GHN	HMD	ICK	MPC	YIC
Busan Transportation Corporation	—	—	—	2–3	1–2	—	—	1–1	—	0–0
Changwon City	0–0	—	—	—	—	—	2–1	1–0	—	1–1
Cheonan City	1–0	1–2	—	—	—	0–0	0–4	—	—	2–1
Gangneung City	—	0–0	2–1	—	3–3	—	—	0–0	1–2	—
Gimhae City	—	0–1	2–1	—	—	0–0	2–1	—	0–0	—
Gyeongju KHNP	1–2	1–2	—	1–1	—	—	0–0	—	1–0	—
Hyundai Mipo Dockyard	2–0	—	—	1–0	3–2	—	—	—	1–2	—
Incheon Korail	—	—	5–2	—	0–0	4–3	1–2	—	—	—
Mokpo City	0–1	0–2	1–1	—	—	—	—	1–1	—	—
Yongin City	—	—	—	5–0	—	0–2	0–3	3–3	1–1	—

Source: Korea National League (in Korean)
Legend: Blue = home team win; Yellow = draw; Red = away team win.

== Championship playoffs ==
First round
3	Changwon City	0	2	2
4	Gyeongju KHNP	2	3	5

Semi-final
2	Incheon Korail	0	1	1
1R	Gyeongju KHNP	1	4	5

Final
SF	Gyeongju KHNP	1	1	2
1	Hyundai Mipo Dockyard (a.e.t.)	1	2	3

== See also ==
- 2013 in South Korean football
- 2013 Korea National League Championship
- 2013 Korean FA Cup
