= Kim Byung-oh =

South Korean footballer (born 1989)

Personal information
- Full name: Kim Byung-oh
- Date of birth: 26 June 1989 (age 37)
- Place of birth: South Korea
- Height: 1.84 m (6 ft 1/2 in)
- Position: Forward

Team information
- Current team: Hwaseong FC
- Number: 14

Youth career
- 2008–2011: Sungkyunkwan University

Senior career*
Years	Team	Apps	(Gls)
2012	CFR Cluj	0	(0)
2012	Ulsan Hyundai Mipo	10	(3)
2013	FC Anyang	17	(1)
2014	Daejeon Korail	20	(9)
2015	Chungju Hummel	33	(9)
2016–2019	Suwon FC	53	(6)
2017–2018	→ Sangju Sangmu (army)	25	(3)
2020–2021	Busan IPark	20	(0)
2021	Jeonnam Dragons	15	(0)
2022–2023	Chainat Hornbill	8	(1)
2023–2024	Daejeon Korail	19	(2)
2024–2025	Chungbuk Cheongju	21	(3)
2025–	Hwaseong FC	36	(5)

International career
2009–2010	South Korea U-23		
- * Club domestic league appearances and goals as of 5 August 2026

- Kim Byung-oh
- Hangul: 김병오
- Hanja: 金炳哦
- RR: Gim Byeongo
- MR: Kim Pyŏngo

Kim Byung-oh (Korean: 김병오; born 26 June 1989) is a South Korean footballer who plays as forward for Hwaseong FC.

== Career ==
Kim played for CFR Cluj first half of 2012, but made no appearance. He returned to South Korea that summer and signed with Ulsan Hyundai Mipo. He joined Chungju Hummel in January 2015. In July 2022 Kim Byung-oh joined Chainat Hornbill in Thai League 2
