= Park Dae-han (footballer, born 1996) =

South Korean footballer

Personal information
- Full name: Park Dae-han
- Date of birth: 19 April 1996 (age 30)
- Place of birth: South Korea
- Position: Goalkeeper

Team information
- Current team: Cheonan City
- Number: 21

Senior career*
Years	Team	Apps	(Gls)
2017–2023	Jeonnam Dragons	13	(0)
2023–2024	Chungbuk Cheongju	46	(0)
2025	Busan IPark	2	(0)
2025–	Cheonan City	14	(0)
- * Club domestic league appearances and goals as of 7 January 2026

Park Dae-han (born 19 April 1996) is a South Korean footballer who plays for Cheonan City.
