= Sehan University =

University in South Jeolla, South Korea

Coordinates: 34°45′13″N 126°29′04″E

- Hangul: 세한대학교
- Hanja: 世翰大學校
- RR: Sehan daehakgyo
- MR: Sehan taehakkyo

Sehan University is a private university located in Yeongam County, South Jeolla, South Korea. The current president is Lee Gyeong-sue (이경수), who has led the university since its founding in 1994.

== Academics ==
Six colleges oversee the university's undergraduate offerings: Teacher Training, Art and Physical Education, Public Health, Engineering, Police and Fire, and Humanities. There is a general graduate school, offering graduate training in many of these fields, and specialized graduate schools of Industrial Technology, Business Administration, Social Welfare, Public Health, and Education.

== History ==
The school opened in 1994 as Daebul Industrial College (대불공과대학). It became a university the following year.

== Notable people ==
- Seo In-guk, actor and singer
- Yoon Kyun-sang, actor and model

== See also ==
- List of colleges and universities in South Korea
- Education in South Korea
