= Kim Seo-jun (footballer) =

South Korean footballer (born 1989)

Personal information
- Date of birth: 24 March 1989 (age 37)
- Place of birth: South Korea
- Height: 1.73 m (5 ft 8 in)
- Position: Midfielder

Team information
- Current team: Gyeongju KH&NP

Youth career
- 2008–2011: Hannam University

Senior career*
Years	Team	Apps	(Gls)
2012–2013	Ulsan Hyundai	18	(4)
2012	→ Ulsan Hyundai Mipo (loan)	17	(4)
2013	→ Suwon FC (loan)	19	(3)
2014–2015	Suwon FC	52	(7)
2016–	Gyeongju KH&NP		
- * Club domestic league appearances and goals as of 1 January 2016

Kim Seo-jun (Korean: 김서준; born 24 March 1989) is a South Korean footballer who plays as midfielder for Gyeongju KH&NP in Korea National League.

== Career ==
He was selected by Ulsan Hyundai FC in the 2012 K League draft.

In July 2013, he joined Suwon FC on loan and made 19 appearances and 2 goals. He signed with Suwon FC on a permanent basis in 2014.
