= Lee Kang-uk =

South Korean footballer

Personal information
- Full name: Lee Kang-uk
- Date of birth: March 19, 1994 (age 32)
- Place of birth: South Korea
- Height: 1.80 m (5 ft 11 in)
- Position: Forward

Team information
- Current team: Changwon City FC
- Number: 20

Senior career*
Years	Team	Apps	(Gls)
2015–2016	Jeonju FC		
2016–2017	Thespakusatsu Gunma	10	(1)
2017–2018	Cheonan City	37	(6)
2019-2021	Busan Transportation Corporation FC	69	(9)
2022-	Changwon City FC	22	(3)
- * Club domestic league appearances and goals as of 21 October 2022

Lee Kang-uk (Korean: 이강욱; born March 19, 1994) is a South Korean football player who plays for Changwon City FC as a forward.

== Career ==
Lee Kang-uk joined the J2 League club Thespakusatsu Gunma in 2016.
