= Kim Tae-wook =

South Korean footballer

Kim Tae-Wook
Personal information
- Full name: Kim Tae-Wook
- Date of birth: 9 July 1987 (age 39)
- Place of birth: Changwon, South Korea
- Height: 1.82 m (5 ft 11 1/2 in)
- Position: Midfielder

Team information
- Current team: Daejeon Korail FC
- Number: 11

Youth career
- 2006–2008: Sunmoon University

Senior career*
Years	Team	Apps	(Gls)
2009–2011	Gyeongnam FC	63	(4)
2011–2013	Incheon Korail	7	(0)
2014–2015	Perseba Super	0	(0)
2015–	Daejeon Korail FC	0	(0)
- * Club domestic league appearances and goals as of 6 March 2012

- Kim Tae-wook
- Hangul: 김태욱
- Hanja: 金兌昱
- RR: Gim Taeuk
- MR: Kim T'aeuk

Kim Tae-Wook (Korean: 김태욱; born 9 July 1987) is a South Korean footballer.

== Club career statistics ==
As of 6 March 2011

Club performance			League		Cup		League Cup		Total	
Season	Club	League	Apps	Goals	Apps	Goals	Apps	Goals	Apps	Goals
South Korea			League		KFA Cup		League Cup		Total	
2009	Gyeongnam FC	K-League	23	1	2	0	4	1	29	2
2010	Gyeongnam FC	K-League	26	2	1	0	6	0	33	2
2011	Gyeongnam FC	K-League	1	0					1	0
Career total			50	3	3	0	10	1	63	4
