= Lee Gwan-pyo =

South Korean footballer

Personal information
- Full name: Lee Gwan-pyo
- Date of birth: 7 September 1994 (age 32)
- Place of birth: South Korea
- Height: 1.83 m (6 ft 0 in)
- Position: Midfielder

Team information
- Current team: Daejeon Korail

Youth career
- 2013–2014: Chung-Ang University

Senior career*
Years	Team	Apps	(Gls)
2015	Jeju United	0	(0)
2015	→ Suwon FC (loan)	23	(2)
2016–2017	Gyeongnam FC	23	(2)
2018	Gimhae FC	6	(2)
2019–	Daejeon Korail	22	(7)
- * Club domestic league appearances and goals as of 23 December 2019

Lee Gwan-pyo (Korean: 이관표; born 7 September 1994) is a South Korean footballer who plays as a midfielder for Daejeon Korail.

== Career ==
He signed with Jeju United in January 2015.
