= Kim Dong-min =

South Korean footballer

Personal information
- Date of birth: 16 August 1994 (age 32)
- Place of birth: South Korea
- Height: 1.80 m (5 ft 11 in)
- Position: Center-back

Team information
- Current team: Gimpo FC
- Number: 47

Senior career*
Years	Team	Apps	(Gls)
2017–2025	Incheon United	135	(2)
2020–2021	→ Gimcheon Sangmu (army)	8	(0)
2025	→ Gimpo FC (loan)	18	(0)
2026–	Gimpo FC	15	(0)
- * Club domestic league appearances and goals as of 6 August 2026

Kim Dong-min (Korean: 김동민; born 16 August 1994) is a South Korean footballer who plays for Gimpo FC.

== Club career ==
He joined Incheon United ahead of the 2017 season .

On July 18, 2018, he scored his first professional goal in a game against Suwon Samsung Bluewings . However, the team lost 5-2.

== Career statistics ==
As of 25 February 2024

Appearances and goals by club, season and competition
Club	Season	League			National cup		Asia		Total	
Club	Season	Division	Apps	Goals	Apps	Goals	Apps	Goals	Apps	Goals
Incheon United	2017	K League 1	13	0	1	0	—		14	0
Incheon United	2018	K League 1	15	1	2	0	—		17	1
Incheon United	2019	K League 1	23	0	0	0	—		23	0
Incheon United	2021	K League 1	1	0	—		—		1	0
Incheon United	2022	K League 1	32	0	1	0	—		33	0
Incheon United	2023	K League 1	27	0	1	0	4	0	32	0
Incheon United	Total		111	1	5	0	4	0	120	1
Sangju Sangmu/ Gimcheon Sangmu (army)	2020	K League 1	0	0	0	0	—		0	0
Sangju Sangmu/ Gimcheon Sangmu (army)	2021	K League 2	8	0	2	0	—		10	0
Sangju Sangmu/ Gimcheon Sangmu (army)	Total		8	0	2	0	—		10	0
Career total			119	1	7	0	4	0	130	1
