= Cheonan City FC =

South Korean football club

- Full name: Cheonan City Football Club 천안시민프로축구단
- Founded: 9 January 2008; 18 years ago
- Ground: Cheonan Stadium
- Capacity: 26,000
- Manager: Park Jin-sub
- League: K League 2
- 2025: K League 2, 13th of 14
- Website: cheonancityfc.kr
Home colours	Away colours

Cheonan City FC (천안 시티 FC) is a South Korean football club based in Cheonan that competes in the K League 2, the second tier of the South Korean football league system.

== History ==
Cheonan City FC was founded in 2008 and competed in the Korea National League from 2008 to 2019, and the K3 League from 2020 to 2022.

Before the 2023 season, the team moved to the second-tier K League 2 and became fully professional.

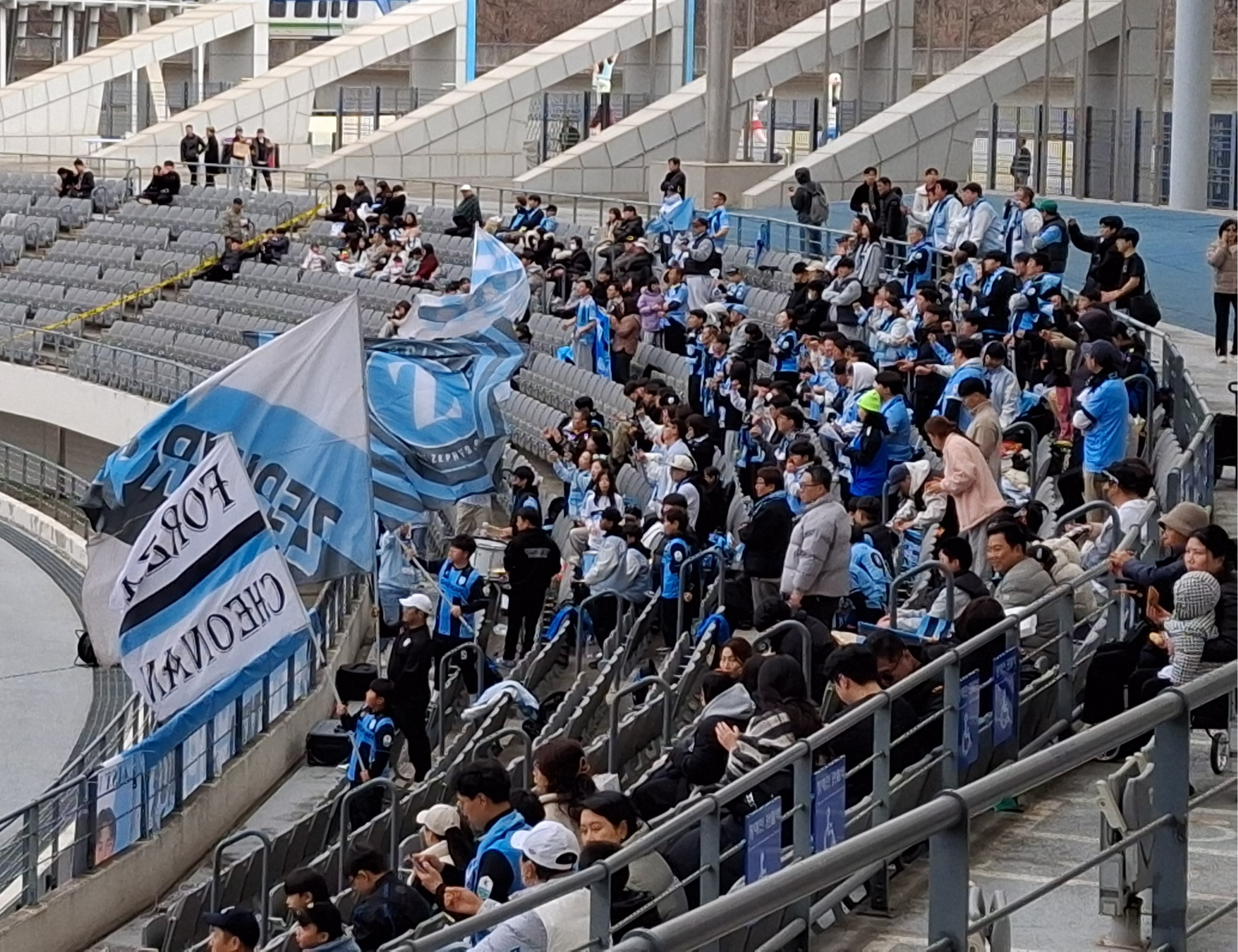
Cheonan City away fans at Yongin Mireu Stadium in 2026

== Stadium ==
Cheonan City play at Cheonan Stadium, a multi-purpose stadium with a capacity of 26,000.

== Current squad ==
As of 5 November 2026

Note: Flags indicate national team as defined under FIFA eligibility rules; some limited exceptions apply. Players may hold more than one non-FIFA nationality.

No.	Pos.	Nation	Player
1	GK	KOR	Park Ju-won
2	DF	KOR	Shin Han-gyeol
3	DF	KOR	Lee Kwang-jun
4	MF	KOR	Choi Jun-hyeok
5	DF	KOR	Ko Tae-won (captain)
6	DF	KOR	Choi Kyu-baek
7	FW	KOR	Lee Sang-jun (vice-captain)
8	MF	KOR	Heo Dong-min
9	FW	KOR	Lee Jun-ho
10	MF	MLI	Aboubacar Toungara
11	FW	KOR	Lee Ji-hoon
13	DF	KOR	Jang Hyun-do
14	MF	KOR	Koo Jong-uk
16	DF	KOR	Kim Sung-joo (vice-captain)
17	MF	KOR	Lee Ji-seung
18	FW	KOR	Ahn Chang-min (on loan from Gimpo FC)
19	MF	KOR	Jin Ui-jun
20	DF	KOR	Lee Sang-yong

No.	Pos.	Nation	Player
21	GK	KOR	Park Dae-han
22	DF	KOR	Eo Eun-kyul
23	DF	KOR	Lee Dong-hyeop (on loan from Pohang Steelers)
24	DF	KOR	Kwon Yong-seung
27	DF	KOR	Park Chang-woo
29	DF	KOR	Kang Kyo-hoon
31	GK	KOR	Kim Dong-ha
33	GK	KOR	Lee Seung-gyu
42	MF	KOR	Ha Jae-min
47	FW	KOR	Woo Jeong-yeon
55	DF	KOR	Oh Seong-min
66	DF	KOR	Jeong Ji-hwang
70	FW	BRA	Gustavo Sarjani
77	FW	KOR	Lee Kyu-min (on loan from Pohang Steelers)
88	MF	KOR	Yoon Yong-ho
94	FW	BRA	Willyan (on loan from Suwon FC)
97	FW	GBS	Ivanildo
99	MF	BRA	Bruno Lamas

=== Out on loan and military service ===
Note: Flags indicate national team as defined under FIFA eligibility rules; some limited exceptions apply. Players may hold more than one non-FIFA nationality.

No.	Pos.	Nation	Player
—	DF	KOR	Cha Seung-hyeon (at Gimcheon Sangmu for military service)
—	DF	KOR	Lee Hyeon-wang (at Yeoju FC)

No.	Pos.	Nation	Player
—	MF	KOR	Jang Seong-jae (at Sejong SA for military service)
—	MF	KOR	Lee Poong-beom (at Seoul Jungnang for military service)

== Honours ==
- K3 League
  - Runners-up (1): 2021
- Korea National League Championship
  - Runners-up (2): 2013, 2017
- Korean National Sports Festival
  - Gold medal (2): 2010, 2016
  - Bronze medal (1): 2009
- Korean President's Cup
  - Runners-up (1): 2009

== Season-by-season records ==
Season	Korea National League / K3 League											Korean FA Cup	League Cup	Top scorer (league goals)
Season	Stage	Teams	P	W	D	L	GF	GA	GD	Pts	Position	Korean FA Cup	League Cup	Top scorer (league goals)
2008	First stage	14	13	5	4	4	18	15	+3	19	7th	First round	Group stage	Gu Hyun-seo (13)
2008	Second stage	14	13	3	4	6	22	27	–5	13	11th	First round	Group stage	Gu Hyun-seo (13)
2009	First stage	14	13	4	3	6	14	18	–4	15	10th	First round	Group stage	Nam Ki-il (5)
2009	Second stage	13	12	4	1	7	15	13	+2	13	10th	First round	Group stage	Nam Ki-il (5)
2010	First stage	15	14	6	3	5	21	17	+4	21	7th	Round of 32	Group stage	Kwon Yong-nam (9)
2010	Second stage	15	14	8	2	4	23	13	+10	26	4th	Round of 32	Group stage	Kwon Yong-nam (9)
2011	Regular season	14	26	9	8	9	31	31	0	35	9th	Round of 32	Quarterfinals	Hwang Ho-lyeong (10)
2012	Regular season	14	26	6	1	19	25	45	–20	19	13th	Round of 32	Group stage	Kwon Yong-hyun (6)
2013	Regular season	10	27	6	5	16	29	51	–22	23	10th	Second round	Runners-up	Kwak Rae-seung (12)
2014	Regular season	10	27	10	4	13	25	30	–5	34	7th	Round of 16	Group stage	three players (4)
2015	Regular season	10	27	6	10	11	27	39	–12	28	8th	Round of 16	Group stage	Cho Eee-rok (6)
2016	Regular season	10	27	10	9	8	34	31	+3	39	5th	Third round	Group stage	Lee Kwan-yong (6)
2017	Regular season	8	28	15	4	9	37	33	+4	49	3rd	Third round	Runners-up	Cho Eee-rok (10)
2018	Regular season	8	28	13	7	8	33	32	+1	46	3rd	Round of 16	Semifinals	Cho Hyung-ik; Lee Kang-uk (both 5)
2019	Regular season	8	28	12	8	8	32	33	–1	44	2nd	Round of 16	Group stage	Hur Jun-ho (6)
2020	Regular season	16	22	9	6	7	27	25	+2	33	11th	Second round	—N/a	Jerry van Ewijk (5)
2021	Regular season	15	28	16	6	6	50	25	+25	54	1st	Second round	—N/a	Kim Jong-suk (15)
2022	Regular season	16	30	9	13	8	30	27	+3	40	10th	Second round	—N/a	Yoon Yong-ho (10)
Season	K League 2											Korea Cup	League Cup	Top scorer (league goals)
Season	Stage	Teams	P	W	D	L	GF	GA	GD	Pts	Position	Korea Cup	League Cup	Top scorer (league goals)
2023	Regular season	13	36	5	10	21	33	62	–29	25	13th	Third round	—N/a	Bruno Mota (10)
2024	Regular season	13	36	11	10	15	48	57	–9	43	9th	Third round	—N/a	Bruno Mota (16)
2025	Regular season	14	39	7	9	23	41	70	–29	30	13th	Third round	—N/a	Aboubacar Toungara (8)

== See also ==
- List of football clubs in South Korea
