= Cheonan Stadium =

Stadium in Cheonan, South Korea

- 천안종합운동장
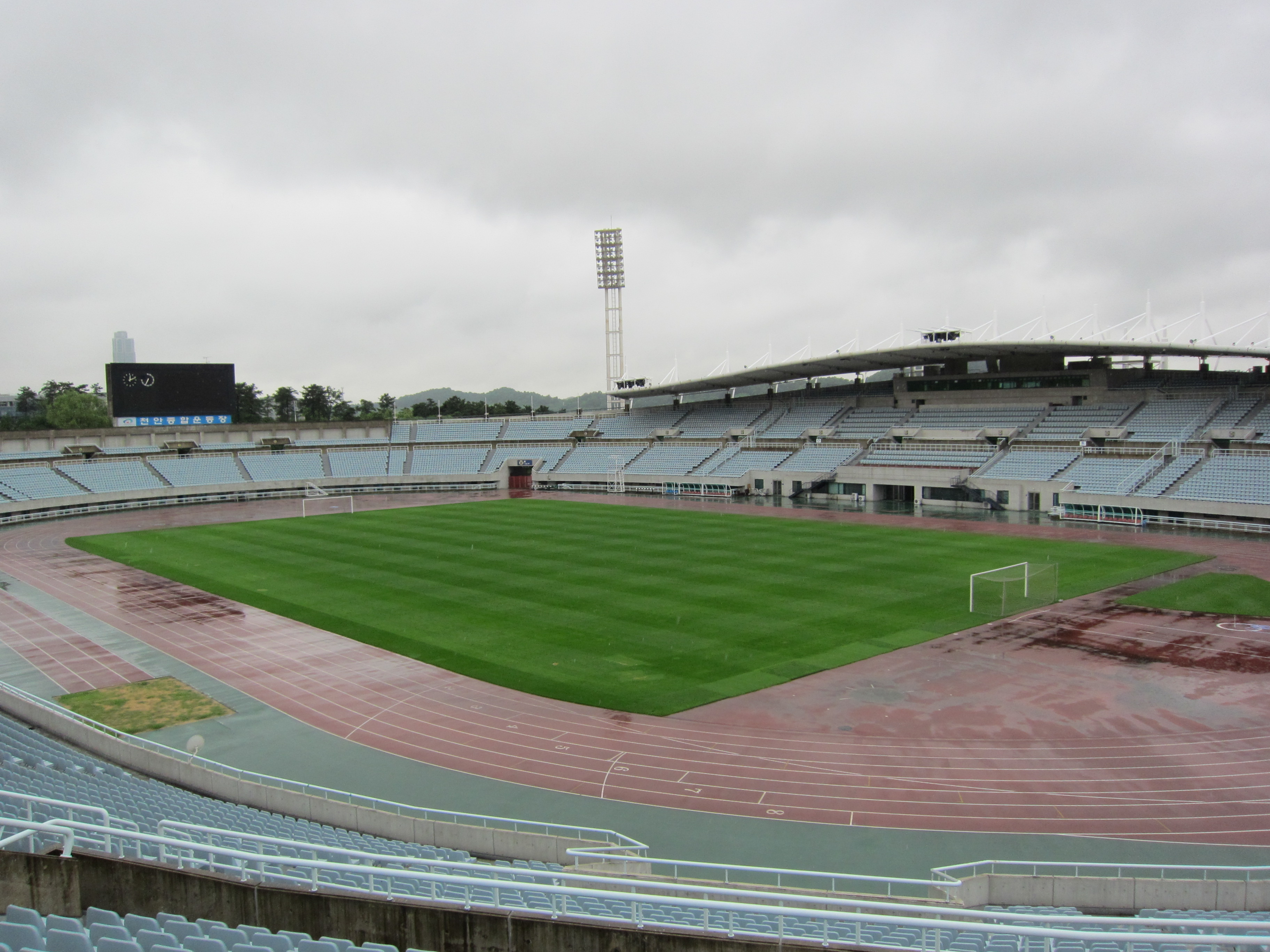
- Interactive map of Cheonan Stadium
- Location: Cheonan, South Korea
- Coordinates: 36°49′07″N 127°06′54″E
- Owner: Cheonan City Facilities Management Corporation
- Capacity: 26,000

Construction
- Opened: 31 August 2001

Tenants
- Cheonan City (2008–2010, 2020–2021, 2023–present); Seoul E-Land (2019)

Cheonan Stadium (Korean: 천안종합운동장) is a multi-purpose stadium in Cheonan, South Korea. Built in 2001, it is currently used mostly for football matches and can accommodate 26,000 spectators. On 15 October 2013, the South Korea national football team used the stadium for the first time in a friendly match against Mali, which ended in a 3–1 victory for South Korea. The stadium also hosted nine matches at the 2017 FIFA U-20 World Cup.
