= Daejeon Korail FC =

- Full name: Daejeon Korail Football Club
- Nickname: Iron horse
- Founded: 1943; 83 years ago (original); 1961 or 1962 (refounded)
- Ground: Daejeon Hanbat Sports Complex
- Capacity: 17,371
- Owner: Korail
- Chairman: Jung Chang-young
- Head coach: Kim Seung-hee
- League: K3 League
- 2025: K3 League, 4th of 15
- Website: info.korail.com
Home colours	Away colours

Daejeon Korail FC (Korean: 대전 코레일 FC) is a South Korean football club based in Daejeon that competes in the K3 League, the third tier of South Korean football league system. It is owned and operated by Korea Railroad Corporation, South Korea's national railroad operator. Their home venue is Daejeon Hanbat Sports Complex.

== History ==
After being founded in 1943 by the Chosen Government Railway as Chosen Government Railway FC (조선총독부 철도국 축구단), the team competed in various semi-professional football competitions throughout decades until they joined the Korea National League in 2003.

In 1948, the club changed its name to Ministry of Transportation FC after Joseon Railways was absorbed into Ministry of Transportation by the South Korean government.

The club was inactive during the Korean War and was re-established in 1961 or 1962. It was renamed National Railroad FC (철도청 축구단) in 1963 and Korea Railroad FC (한국철도 축구단) in 1995. In 2004, to comply with Korea National League's club naming policy, the club added the team's location to its name, changing the name to Incheon Korea Railroad FC (인천 한국철도 축구단). After Korea National Railroad was renamed to Korail, the club's name was also changed again to Incheon Korail FC (인천 코레일 축구단) during the 2007 season. At the end of the 2013 season, the club has been renamed to Daejeon Korail FC after the team's relocation from Incheon to Daejeon.

The team played in the Korea National League between 2003 and 2019, when the league merged with the K3 League. They won the 2005 season with a 4–2 aggregate victory over Suwon City in the final. In the Korean FA Cup, the team reached the quarter-finals in 2001 and the semi-finals in 2005. In the 2019 edition, the team reached the final, where they lost 4–0 on aggregate to the top division side Suwon Samsung Bluewings.

== Honours ==
=== League ===
- Korea National League

Winners (2): 2005, 2012
Runners-up (1): 2014

=== Cups ===
- Korean FA Cup

Runners-up (1): 2019

- Korea National League Championship

Winners (3): 2013, 2015, 2018
Runners-up (1): 2016

- Korean National Sports Festival

Gold Medal (3): 2000, 2001, 2011

- Korean National Football Championship

Runners-up (1): 2000

- Korean President's Cup

Runners-up (1): 2004

== Season-by-season records ==
Season	Korea National League / K3 League											Korean FA Cup	National Championship	Top scorer (league goals)	Manager
Season	Stage	Teams	P	W	D	L	GF	GA	GD	Pts	Position	Korean FA Cup	National Championship	Top scorer (league goals)	Manager
1996	No league											Did not qualify	Not held	No league	
1997	No league											Did not qualify	Not held	No league	
1998	No league											Did not qualify	Not held	No league	
1999	No league											Quarterfinals	Not held	No league	
2000	No league											Preliminary round	Not held	No league	
2001	No league											Quarterfinals	Not held	No league	
2002	No league											Round of 16	Not held	No league	
2003	First stage	10	9	3	4	2	14	10	+4	13	5th	Round of 32	Not held	Lee Soon-haeng (5)	
2003	Second stage	10	9	1	2	6	5	14	−9	5	9th	Round of 32	Not held	Lee Soon-haeng (5)	
2004	First stage	10	9	2	3	4	6	9	−3	9	7th	Round of 16	Group stage	Sung Nak-seon (3)	
2004	Second stage	10	9	1	7	1	10	10	0	10	5th	Round of 16	Group stage	Sung Nak-seon (3)	
2005	First stage	11	10	4	1	5	10	11	−1	13	7th	Semifinals	Group stage	Kim Eun-chul (6)	
2005	Second stage	11	10	6	3	1	14	7	+7	21	1st	Semifinals	Group stage	Kim Eun-chul (6)	
2005	Playoff	2	2	2	0	0	4	2	+2	—	Champions	Semifinals	Group stage	Kim Eun-chul (6)	
2006	First stage	11	10	4	3	3	14	13	+1	15	6th	Round of 16	Quarterfinals	Kim Heung-seop (9)	
2006	Second stage	11	10	5	3	2	16	8	+8	18	4th	Round of 16	Quarterfinals	Kim Heung-seop (9)	
2007	First stage	12	11	7	1	3	16	10	+6	22	3rd	Round of 26	Semifinals	Kim Min-soo (8)	Kim Seung-hee
2007	Second stage	12	11	6	2	3	20	18	+2	20	3rd	Round of 26	Semifinals	Kim Min-soo (8)	Kim Seung-hee
2008	First stage	14	13	2	3	8	12	21	−9	8	12th	Round of 32	Semifinals	Park Chun-sin (5)	Kim Seung-hee
2008	Second stage	14	13	3	3	7	13	24	−11	12	12th	Round of 32	Semifinals	Park Chun-sin (5)	Kim Seung-hee
2009	First stage	14	13	6	5	2	20	13	+7	23	3rd	Round of 32	Group stage	Heo Sin-young (8)	Kim Seung-hee
2009	Second stage	13	12	5	1	6	11	15	−4	16	7th	Round of 32	Group stage	Heo Sin-young (8)	Kim Seung-hee
2010	First stage	15	14	7	5	2	23	17	+6	26	3rd	Round of 32	Group stage	Kim Hyung-woon (9)	Kim Seung-hee
2010	Second stage	15	14	2	5	7	17	21	−4	11	13th	Round of 32	Group stage	Kim Hyung-woon (9)	Kim Seung-hee
2011	Regular season	14	26	11	6	9	29	23	+6	39	6th	Second round	Semifinals	Park Ju-ho (6)	Kim Seung-hee
2011	Playoff	6	1	0	0	1	2	3	−1	—	Round of 6	Second round	Semifinals	Park Ju-ho (6)	Kim Seung-hee
2012	Regular season	14	26	12	6	8	39	30	+9	42	5th	Round of 32	Group stage	Kim Tae-wook (7)	Kim Seung-hee
2012	Playoff	6	5	5	0	0	11	4	+7	—	Champions	Round of 32	Group stage	Kim Tae-wook (7)	Kim Seung-hee
2013	Regular season	10	27	12	9	6	42	32	+10	45	2nd	Second round	Winners	Shin Myung-jae (9)	Kim Seung-hee
2013	Playoff	4	2	0	0	2	1	5	−4	—	Semifinal	Second round	Winners	Shin Myung-jae (9)	Kim Seung-hee
2014	Regular season	10	27	14	7	6	41	28	+13	49	1st	Round of 16	Group stage	Kim Byung-oh; Moon Byung-woo (both 9)	Kim Seung-hee
2014	Playoff	4	2	0	1	1	1	3	−2	—	Runners-up	Round of 16	Group stage	Kim Byung-oh; Moon Byung-woo (both 9)	Kim Seung-hee
2015	Regular season	10	27	8	9	10	36	27	+9	33	5th	Round of 16	Winners	Kim Jun (6)	Kim Seung-hee
2016	Regular season	10	27	8	10	9	33	41	–8	34	7th	Round of 32	Runners-up	Kwak Chul-ho (16)	Kim Seung-hee
2017	Regular season	8	28	10	9	9	31	34	–3	39	4th	Round of 32	Semifinals	Park Jin-seop (11)	Kim Seung-hee
2018	Regular season	8	28	7	6	15	31	40	–9	27	7th	Round of 32	Winners	Kwak Chul-ho (6)	Kim Seung-hee
2019	Regular season	8	28	10	9	9	38	36	+2	39	4th	Runners-up	Semifinals	Lee Gwan-pyo (7)	Kim Seung-hee
2020	Regular season	16	15	7	4	4	25	12	+13	25	6th	Second round	Not held		Kim Seung-hee
2020	Championship round	8	22	8	8	6	30	18	+12	32	7th	Second round	Not held		Kim Seung-hee
2021	Regular season	15	28	8	12	8	32	30	+2	36	9th	Second round	Not held		Kim Seung-hee
2022	Regular season	16	30	12	5	13	28	36	–8	41	9th	Round of 16	Not held		Kim Seung-hee
2023	Regular season	15	28	11	6	11	34	32	+2	39	5th	Second round	Not held		Kim Seung-hee
