= Gyeongju Korea Hydro & Nuclear Power FC =

South Korean football team

Gyeongju Korea Hydro and Nuclear Power FC
- Full name: Gyeongju Korea Hydro & Nuclear Power Football Club 경주 한국수력원자력 축구단
- Short name: KHNP
- Founded: 1945; 81 years ago (original); 1962; 64 years ago (refounded)
- Ground: Gyeongju Civic Stadium
- Capacity: 12,199
- Owner: Korea Hydro & Nuclear Power
- Chairman: Jung Jae-hoon
- Coach: Seo Bo Won
- League: K3 League
- 2024: 3rd of 16
- Website: http://www.khnp.co.kr/khnpfc/
| Home colours | Away colours |

Gyeongju Korea Hydro and Nuclear Power FC (Korean: 경주 한국수력원자력 FC) or simply Gyeongju KHNP is a South Korean football team based in Gyeongju. They currently compete in the K3 League. They are run by Korea Hydro & Nuclear Power and play their home games at Gyeongju Civic Stadium.

== History ==
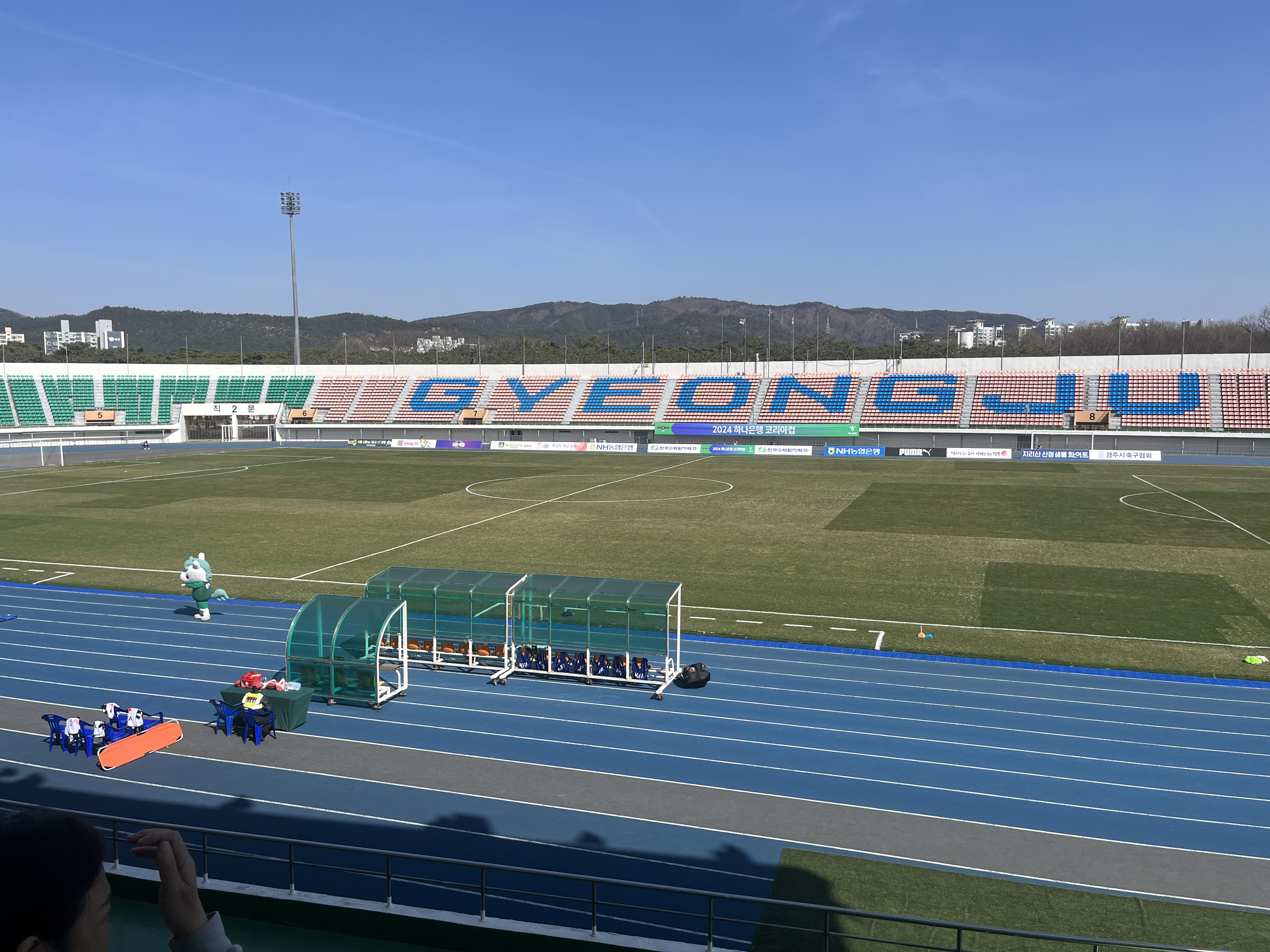
Gyeongju Civic Stadium, where Gyeongju KHNP FC play their home matches

The club was originally founded in 1945 as Gyeongseong Electric Football Club (Korean: 경성전기 축구단) but was dissolved in 1950 due to the Korean War. They were later re-established in 1962 as the KEPCO Football Club (Korean: 한국전력 축구단). From 2001, the team was re-established again, this time as KHNP FC (Korean: 한국수력원자력 축구단). Based in Daejeon, the club joined the semi-professional Korea National League, known at the time as the K2 League, in its inaugural season in 2003.

As Daejeon KHNP, they were runners-up in the 2010 National League, losing to Suwon City in the playoff final after finishing the first stage of the league in first place.

Ahead of the 2013 season, the club relocated to Gyeongju. Rebranded as Gyeongju KHNP, they were National League runners-up again in 2013 and 2015 before becoming champions for the first time in 2017.

They successfully defended their title in 2018 but failed to gain a third in 2019, finishing as runners-up following a 2-0 defeat by Gangneung City in the championship final.

Gyeongju KHNP joined the newly relaunched K3 League in its inaugural season after it absorbed the National League in 2020. They finished the 2020 season as runners-up.

In 2016, Gyeongju KHNP FC and the mayor of Gyeongju announced that a women's football team would be established alongside the existing men's team, along with a women's soccer team training center being set up. Gyeongju KHNP WFC was formally launched in 2017.

== Honours ==
=== Domestic competitions ===
==== League ====
- K3 League
  - Runners-up (1): 2020
- National League
  - Winners (2): 2017, 2018
  - Runners-up (4): 2010, 2013, 2015, 2019

==== Cups ====
- National League Championship
  - Winners (3): 2008, 2014, 2019
  - Runners-up (2): 2009, 2018
- National Sports Festival
  - Gold Medal (1): 1967
  - Silver Medal (1): 2009
- National Football Championship
  - Winners (2): 1962, 1965
  - Runners-up (4): 1964, 1967, 1980, 1982
- President's Cup
  - Winners (1): 1962
  - Runners-up (3): 1964, 1967, 1993

== Season-by-season records ==
| Season | Korea National League | | | | | | | | | | | Korean FA Cup | League Cup | Top scorer (league goals) | Manager |
| Season | Stage | Teams | P | W | D | L | GF | GA | GD | Pts | Position | Korean FA Cup | League Cup | Top scorer (league goals) | Manager |
|---|---|---|---|---|---|---|---|---|---|---|---|---|---|---|---|
| 2003 | First stage | 10 | 9 | 0 | 3 | 6 | 5 | 15 | –10 | 3 | 10th | did not qualify | None | (South Korea) Park Sin-young (3) | (South Korea) Bae Jong-woo |
| 2003 | Second stage | 10 | 9 | 0 | 4 | 5 | 4 | 14 | –10 | 4 | 10th | did not qualify | None | (South Korea) Park Sin-young (3) | (South Korea) Bae Jong-woo |
| 2004 | First stage | 10 | 9 | 3 | 3 | 3 | 9 | 9 | 0 | 12 | 4th | Preliminary round | Semifinals | (South Korea) Kim Hong-ki (4) (South Korea) Kim Jung-hyun (4) | (South Korea) Bae Jong-woo |
| 2004 | Second stage | 10 | 9 | 2 | 3 | 4 | 10 | 15 | –5 | 9 | 8th | Preliminary round | Semifinals | (South Korea) Kim Hong-ki (4) (South Korea) Kim Jung-hyun (4) | (South Korea) Bae Jong-woo |
| 2005 | First stage | 11 | 10 | 1 | 2 | 7 | 7 | 14 | –7 | 5 | 10th | Round of 16 | Group stage | (South Korea) Lee Hyun-dong (4) | (South Korea) Bae Jong-woo |
| 2005 | Second stage | 11 | 10 | 0 | 3 | 7 | 6 | 20 | –14 | 3 | 11th | Round of 16 | Group stage | (South Korea) Lee Hyun-dong (4) | (South Korea) Bae Jong-woo |
| 2006 | First stage | 11 | 10 | 1 | 3 | 6 | 8 | 15 | –7 | 6 | 9th | First round | Quarterfinals | (South Korea) Kim Seung-ho (6) | (South Korea) Bae Jong-woo |
| 2006 | Second stage | 11 | 10 | 2 | 2 | 6 | 10 | 22 | –12 | 8 | 9th | First round | Quarterfinals | (South Korea) Kim Seung-ho (6) | (South Korea) Bae Jong-woo |
| 2007 | First stage | 12 | 11 | 3 | 5 | 3 | 13 | 10 | +2 | 14 | 5th | First round | Group stage | (South Korea) Jeong Woong (4) | (South Korea) Bae Jong-woo |
| 2007 | Second stage | 12 | 11 | 1 | 4 | 6 | 7 | 17 | –10 | 7 | 10th | First round | Group stage | (South Korea) Jeong Woong (4) | (South Korea) Bae Jong-woo |
| 2008 | First stage | 14 | 13 | 4 | 4 | 5 | 16 | 17 | –1 | 16 | 8th | First round | Winners | (South Korea) Cho Joo-young (10) | (South Korea) Bae Jong-woo |
| 2008 | Second stage | 14 | 13 | 6 | 2 | 5 | 18 | 13 | +5 | 20 | 6th | First round | Winners | (South Korea) Cho Joo-young (10) | (South Korea) Bae Jong-woo |
| 2009 | First stage | 14 | 13 | 3 | 5 | 5 | 21 | 23 | –2 | 14 | 11th | First round | Runners-up | (South Korea) Cho Joo-young (8) | (South Korea) Bae Jong-woo |
| 2009 | Second stage | 13 | 12 | 3 | 5 | 4 | 14 | 18 | –4 | 14 | 9th | First round | Runners-up | (South Korea) Cho Joo-young (8) | (South Korea) Bae Jong-woo |
| 2010 | First stage | 15 | 14 | 8 | 4 | 2 | 28 | 19 | +9 | 28 | 1st | Round of 16 | Quarterfinals | (South Korea) Kim Young-nam (18) | (South Korea) Bae Jong-woo |
| 2010 | Second stage | 15 | 14 | 3 | 2 | 9 | 17 | 24 | –7 | 11 | 14th | Round of 16 | Quarterfinals | (South Korea) Kim Young-nam (18) | (South Korea) Bae Jong-woo |
| 2010 | Playoffs | 4 | 3 | 2 | 0 | 1 | 3 | 3 | 0 | — | Runners-up | Round of 16 | Quarterfinals | (South Korea) Kim Young-nam (18) | (South Korea) Bae Jong-woo |
| 2011 | Regular season | 14 | 26 | 9 | 8 | 9 | 40 | 38 | +2 | 35 | 8th | Round of 32 | Group stage | (South Korea) Hong Hyung-gi (10) | (South Korea) Bae Jong-woo (September 2011) (South Korea) Uh Yong-kuk (interim) |
| 2012 | Regular season | 14 | 26 | 3 | 3 | 20 | 22 | 54 | –32 | 12 | 14th | Round of 32 | Quarterfinals | (South Korea) Kang Sung-bok (4) | (South Korea) Uh Yong-kuk |
| 2013 | Regular season | 10 | 27 | 9 | 10 | 8 | 29 | 26 | +3 | 37 | 4th | Round of 32 | Group stage | | |
| 2014 | Regular season | 10 | 27 | 14 | 6 | 7 | 41 | 28 | +13 | 48 | 3rd | Round of 32 | Winners | | |
| 2015 | Regular season | 10 | 27 | 12 | 9 | 6 | 39 | 27 | +12 | 45 | 3rd | Round of 32 | Semifinals | | |
| 2016 | Regular season | 10 | 27 | 11 | 9 | 7 | 43 | 31 | +12 | 42 | 3rd | Round of 32 | Group stage | | |
| 2017 | Regular season | 8 | 27 | 14 | 9 | 5 | 39 | 21 | +18 | 51 | 1st | Round of 32 | Semifinals | | |
| 2018 | Regular season | 8 | 27 | 18 | 7 | 3 | 46 | 25 | +21 | 61 | 1st | Round of 16 | Runner-up | | (South Korea) Seo Bo-won |
| 2019 | Regular season | 8 | 28 | 10 | 11 | 7 | 35 | 28 | +7 | 41 | 3rd | Quarterfinals | Winners | | (South Korea) Seo Bo-won |
| Season | K3 League | | | | | | | | | | | Korean FA Cup | League Cup | Top scorer (league goals) | Manager |
| Season | Stage | Teams | P | W | D | L | GF | GA | GD | Pts | Position | Korean FA Cup | League Cup | Top scorer (league goals) | Manager |
| 2020 | Regular season | 16 | 22 | 12 | 6 | 4 | 38 | 20 | +18 | 42 | 2nd | Round of 16 | Not eligible | | (South Korea) Seo Bo-won |
| 2021 | Regular season | 15 | 28 | 13 | 7 | 8 | 39 | 30 | +9 | 46 | 4th | Second Round | Not eligible | | (South Korea) Seo Bo-won |
| 2022 | Regular season | 16 | 30 | 15 | 8 | 7 | 44 | 26 | +18 | 53 | 3rd | Third Round | Not eligible | | (South Korea) Seo Bo-won |
| 2023 | Regular season | 15 | 28 | 8 | 10 | 10 | 28 | 32 | -4 | 34 | 10th | Second Round | Not eligible | | (South Korea) Seo Bo-won |
| 2024 | Regular season | 16 | 30 | 17 | 5 | 8 | 44 | 28 | +16 | 56 | 3rd | Second Round | Not eligible | | (South Korea) Seo Bo-won |
| 2025 | Regular season | 15 | 28 | | | | | | +- | TBD | TBD | | Not eligible | | (South Korea) Seo Bo-won |

== Current squad ==
As of 8 March 2025

Note: Flags indicate national team as defined under FIFA eligibility rules; some limited exceptions apply. Players may hold more than one non-FIFA nationality.

| No. | Pos. | Nation | Player |
|---|---|---|---|
| 2 | DF | KOR | Yoon Sang-eun |
| 4 | DF | KOR | Gu Dae-yeop |
| 5 | DF | KOR | Park Dong-hyuk |
| 6 | MF | KOR | Hur Dong-ho |
| 7 | FW | KOR | Lee In-gyu |
| 8 | DF | KOR | Lee Sang-won |
| 9 | FW | BRA | Denzel |
| 10 | MF | KOR | Kim Da-won |
| 11 | FW | BRA | Victor Ribeiro |
| 12 | MF | KOR | Lee Seok-hyun |
| 14 | FW | KOR | Lee Seok-gyu |
| 16 | DF | KOR | Jang Ji-sung |
| 17 | MF | KOR | Yang Jung-un |
| 18 | FW | KOR | Moon Seung-won |
| 19 | FW | KOR | Park Geon-woong |

| No. | Pos. | Nation | Player |
|---|---|---|---|
| 20 | FW | KOR | Lee Gi-un |
| 21 | GK | KOR | Park Hee-geun |
| 22 | MF | KOR | Choi Sang-heon |
| 23 | MF | KOR | Oh Yoon-seok |
| 25 | MF | KOR | An Yong-woo |
| 27 | MF | KOR | Choi Da-heen |
| 29 | MF | KOR | Han Bin |
| 31 | GK | KOR | Lee Seok-joo |
| 45 | DF | KOR | Hwang Jun-ho |
| 62 | DF | KOR | Jang Yoo-sub |
| 77 | FW | KOR | Woo Byung-chul |
| 79 | MF | KOR | Park Jun-bae |
| 88 | GK | KOR | Lee Jun-hee |
| 98 | FW | BRA | Alex Camilo |
| 99 | MF | KOR | Sung Ho-young |

== Backroom staff ==
=== Coaching staff ===
- Manager: Seo Bo-won
- Head coach: Ha Yong-woo
- Goalkeeping coach: Kim Min-gyu
- Coaches: Kim Jung-gyum, Seo Dong-hyun
- Medical trainer: Lee Seung-bok

Source: Official website

== See also ==
- Gyeongju Korea Hydro & Nuclear Power WFC
