= 2012 Gwangju FC season =

Gwangju FC
2012 season
- Chairman: Kang Woon-Tae
- Manager: Choi Man-Hee
- K-League: 12th
- Korean FA Cup: Round of 16
- Top goalscorer: League: João Paulo (6); All: João Paulo (6); Bogdan Milić (6)
- Highest home attendance: 10,711 vs Daegu (May 5)
- Lowest home attendance: 1,566 vs Gyeongnam (June 14)
- Average home league attendance: 4,689 (as of June 23)
Home colours	Away colours

The 2012 season was Gwangju FC's second season in the K-League in South Korea. Gwangju FC will be competing in K-League and Korean FA Cup.

== Current squad ==
Note: Flags indicate national team as defined under FIFA eligibility rules; some limited exceptions apply. Players may hold more than one non-FIFA nationality.

No.	Pos.	Nation	Player
1	GK	KOR	Park Ho-Jin
2	DF	KOR	Jeong Woo-In
3	DF	KOR	Jang Kyung-Jin
4	DF	KOR	Lee Yong
5	DF	KOR	Lim Sun-Young
6	MF	KOR	Kim Eun-Sun (captain)
7	MF	KOR	Lee Seung-Gi
8	MF	KOR	An Dong-Hyeok
9	FW	KOR	Kim Dong-Sub
10	FW	KOR	Park Gi-Dong
11	MF	KOR	Jo Woo-Jin
13	FW	KOR	Kim Ho-Nam
14	FW	KOR	Yoo Dong-Min
15	DF	KOR	Yoo Jong-Hyun
16	DF	KOR	Lee Han-Saem
17	MF	KOR	Park Hyun
18	FW	KOR	Park Jeong-Min

No.	Pos.	Nation	Player
19	MF	KOR	Park Hee-Sung (vice-captain)
20	DF	KOR	Kang Min
21	GK	KOR	Yun Gi-Hea
22	DF	KOR	Kim Soo-Beom
23	MF	KOR	Park Min
24	DF	KOR	Park Yo-Han
25	MF	KOR	Yeo Reum
26	DF	KOR	Noh Haeng-Seok
27	DF	KOR	Lim Ha-Ram
28	FW	KOR	Park Jong-In
29	MF	KOR	Moon Du-Yun
31	GK	KOR	Lee Jung-Rae
34	MF	KOR	Ahn Sung-Nam
38	MF	KOR	Yoon Min-Ho
37	FW	BRA	João Paulo
99	FW	MNE	Bogdan Milić

=== Out on loan ===
Note: Flags indicate national team as defined under FIFA eligibility rules; some limited exceptions apply. Players may hold more than one non-FIFA nationality.

No.	Pos.	Nation	Player
—	GK	KOR	Jo Sang-Jun (to National Police Agency for military service)
—	MF	KOR	Kim Hong-Il (to Sangju Sangmu Phoenix for military service)
—	FW	KOR	Kim Sung-Min (to Sangju Sangmu Phoenix for military service)

== Transfer ==
=== In ===
No.	Pos.	Nation	Player
—	MF	KOR	Ahn Sung-Nam (from Gangwon FC, previously on loan)
—	DF	KOR	Jang Kyung-Jin (Free agent, former Incheon United)
—	GK	KOR	Lee Jung-Rae (from Gyeongnam FC)
—	DF	KOR	Park Min (Unattached, former Gyeongnam FC)
—	FW	MNE	Bogdan Milić (from (Russia) PFC Spartak Nalchik)
—	FW	BRA	Adriano Chuva (Unattached, former Pohang Steelers)

No.	Pos.	Nation	Player
—	DF	KOR	Lee Han-Saem (drafted)
—	FW	KOR	Park Jeong-Min (drafted)
—	DF	KOR	Kang Min (drafted from Yongin City FC)
—	GK	KOR	Yun Gi-Hea (drafted)
—	FW	KOR	Park Jong-In (drafted)
—	DF	KOR	Yeo Reum (drafted)
—	MF	KOR	Moon Du-Yun (drafted)

=== Out ===
No.	Pos.	Nation	Player
3	DF	KOR	Park Byeong-Ju (contract terminated, to Jeju United)
16	FW	KOR	Kim Seong-Min (contract terminated)
18	MF	KOR	Kim Hong-Il (to Sangju Sangmu Phoenix, army)
20	DF	KOR	Koh Eun-Seong (contract terminated)
21	GK	KOR	Jo Sang-Jun (to National Police Agency FC, army)
23	MF	KOR	Park Sung-Hwa (contract terminated)
25	FW	KOR	Kim Sung-Min (to Sangju Sangmu Phoenix, army)

No.	Pos.	Nation	Player
28	MF	KOR	Yoon Kwang-Bok (contract terminated)
30	FW	KOR	Kim Sung-Min (contract terminated)
31	DF	KOR	Heo Jae-Won (contract terminated, to Jeju United)
32	MF	KOR	Park Sang-Hyeon (contract terminated)
35	MF	KOR	Lee Jae-Chan (contract terminated)
36	FW	BRA	Celin (contract terminated)
80	FW	BRA	Adriano Chuva (contract terminated)

== Coaching staff ==
Position	Staff
Manager	(South Korea) Choi Man-Hee
Assistant Manager	(South Korea) Yeo Bum-Kyu
Coach	(South Korea) Kim Jung-Su
Coach	(South Korea) Lim Kwan-Sik
Team Doctor	(South Korea) Lee Jun-Young
Trainer	(South Korea) Park Sung-Pil
Trainer	(South Korea) Ko Byung-Hyuk

Last updated: 26 March 2012
Source: Gwangju FC

== Match results ==
=== K-League ===
All times are Korea Standard Time (KST) – UTC+9

Date Round	Home	Score	Away	Location

4 March 1	Sangju	0–1	Gwangju	Sangju, Gyeongbuk
15:00		Report	João Paulo 85' (Assist by No.99)	Stadium: Sangju Civic Stadium; Attendance: 5,710; Referee: Lee Jong-Guk

11 March 2	Gwangju	1–1	Pohang	Nam-gu, Gwangju
15:00	Kim Eun-Sun (0:30)	Report	Zicu 34'	Stadium: Gwangju World Cup Stadium; Attendance: 8,551; Referee: Hong Jin-Ho

18 March 3	Gwangju	3–2	Jeju	Nam-gu, Gwangju
17:00	Kim Dong-Sub 2' (Assist by No.7); João Paulo 88' (pen.); Adriano Chuva 90+2' (Assist by No.37)	Report	Bae Il-Hwan 20', 50'	Stadium: Gwangju World Cup Stadium; Attendance: 3,020; Referee: An Yong-Hee

24 March 4	Busan	1–2	Gwangju	Yeonje-gu, Busan
15:00	Lim Sang-Hyub 52'	Report	Lim Sun-Young 9' (Assist by No.22); João Paulo 65' (Assist by No.99)	Stadium: Busan Asiad Stadium; Attendance: 2,899; Referee: Kim Sung-Ho

1 April 5	Gwangju	1–1	Gangwon	Seo-gu, Gwangju
15:00	Milić 90+3'	Report	Kim Myung-Joong 41'	Stadium: Gwangju World Cup Stadium; Attendance: 3,638; Referee: Woo Sang-Il

8 April 6	Gwangju	0–1	Ulsan	Seo-gu, Gwangju
15:00		Report	Kim Shin-Wook 66'	Stadium: Gwangju World Cup Stadium; Attendance: 3,423; Referee: Yoo Sun-Ho

11 April 7	Incheon	1–1	Gwangju	Nam-gu, Incheon
15:00	Choi Jong-hoan 17'	Report	Kim Eun-Sun 39' (Assist by No.7)	Stadium: Incheon Football Stadium; Attendance: 1,989; Referee: Moon Jin-Hee

15 April 8	Chunnam	2–2	Gwangju	Gwangyang, Jeonnam
17:00	Lee Hyun-Seung 27'; Lee Jong-Ho 81'	Report	Jo Woo-Jin 76' (Assist by No.37); João Paulo 88'	Stadium: Gwangyang Football Stadium; Attendance: 3,040; Referee: Song Min-Seok

22 April 9	Seongnam	4–2	Gwangju	Seongnam, Gyeonggi
17:00	Éverton 49', 55', 72'; Park Se-Young 80'	Report	Milić 35' (Assist by No.22); Milić 59' (Assist by No.37)	Stadium: Tancheon Sports Complex; Attendance: 1,220; Referee: Kim Dong-Jin

27 April 10	Jeonbuk	5–2	Gwangju	Jeonju, Jeonbuk
19:00	Lim You-Hwan 17'; Kim Jung-Woo 23'; Eninho 70' (pen.); Droguett 84'; Kim Dong-Chan 88'	Report	Kim Eun-Sun 45+1' (Assist by No.7); Jeong Woo-In (yellow card) 55' (yellow-red card) 69'; Kim Eun-Sun 76' (Assist by No.7)	Stadium: Jeonju World Cup Stadium; Attendance: 6,792; Referee: Choi Myung-Yong

5 May 11	Gwangju	2–2	Daegu	Seo-gu, Gwangju
15:00	Park Hyun 44'; Milić 49'	Report	Kim Kee-Hee 9'; Lee Jin-Ho 25'	Stadium: Gwangju World Cup Stadium; Attendance: 10,711; Referee: Woo Sang-Il

13 May 12	Suwon	4–1	Gwangju	Suwon, Gyeonggi
16:50	Éverton 47'; Yoo Jong-Hyun 62' (o.g.); Park Hyun-Beom 69'; Cho Yong-Tae 80'	Report	Kim Dong-Sub 37' (pen.)	Stadium: Suwon World Cup Stadium; Attendance: 29,019; Referee: Lee Jong-Guk

19 May 13	Gwangju	1–2	Seoul	Seo-gu, Gwangju
15:00	Lee Han-Saem 78' (Assist by No.22)	Report	Damjanović 6'; Molina 30'	Stadium: Gwangju World Cup Stadium; Attendance: 6,741; Referee: Ko Keum-Bok

28 May 14	Daejeon	2–1	Gwangju	Yuseong-gu, Daejeon
15:00	Ji Kyeong-Deuk 8'; Oris 40'	Report	João Paulo 69' (Assist by No.10)	Stadium: Daejeon World Cup Stadium; Attendance: 5,112; Referee: Kim Dae-Yong

14 June 15	Gwangju	0–1	Gyeongnam	Seo-gu, Gwangju
19:30		Report	Caíque 57'	Stadium: Gwangju World Cup Stadium; Attendance: 1,566; Referee: Kim Sung-Ho

17 June 16	Gwangju	0–0	Incheon	Seo-gu, Gwangju
19:00		Report		Stadium: Gwangju World Cup Stadium; Attendance: 2,416; Referee: Ko Hyung-Jin

23 June 17	Gwangju	6–0	Chunnam	Seo-gu, Gwangju
17:00	Park Min 4' (Assist by No.7); Kim Dong-Sub 28' (Assist by No.22); Kim Eun-Sun 32' (Assist by No.10); Kim Dong-Sub 43' (Assist by No.7); Park Min 45+2' (Assist by No.6); João Paulo 65' (Assist by No.7)	Report		Stadium: Gwangju World Cup Stadium; Attendance: 2,132; Referee: Kim Dae-Yong

27 June 18	Gwangju	0–3	Jeonbuk	Seo-gu, Gwangju
20:00		Report(English); Report(Korean)	Eninho 9' (pen.); Lee Dong-Gook 53'; Lee Seung-Hyun 63'	Stadium: Gwangju World Cup Stadium; Attendance: 2,522; Referee: Woo Sang-Il

1 July 19	Seoul	3–2	Gwangju	Mapo-gu, Seoul
19:00	Kim Ju-Young (yellow card) 13'; Hyun Young-Min (yellow card) 60'; Dejan Damjanović 68', 88' (pen.) (yellow card) 90+3'; Choi Tae-Uk 71'	Report(Eng); Report(Kor)	Kim Dong-Sub 14' (pen.) (yellow card) 29'; Park Ho-Jin (yellow card) 23'; Kim Eun-Sun (yellow card) 26'; Noh Haeng-Seok (yellow card) 51'; Park Min (yellow card) 77'; Park Hyun 83'; João Paulo (yellow card) 83'; Lee Han-Saem (yellow card) 86'	Stadium: Seoul World Cup Stadium; Attendance: 8,361; Referee: Lee Dong-Jun

==== League table ====
Pos	Team	Pld	W	D	L	GF	GA	GD	Pts	Qualification or relegation
12	Seongnam Ilhwa Chunma	44	14	10	20	47	56	−9	52	
13	Daejeon Citizen	44	13	11	20	46	67	−21	50	
14	Gangwon FC	44	14	7	23	57	68	−11	49	
15	Gwangju FC (R)	44	10	15	19	57	67	−10	45	Relegation to the K League Challenge
16	Sangju Sangmu Phoenix (R)	44	7	6	31	29	74	−45	27	Withdrawal (Note: Sangju Sangmu Phoenix were going to be forcibly relegated to the second division by K League Federation regardless of the results after they failed to get a club license from the Asian Football Confederation. They withdrew after the 31st matchweek once their relegation was confirmed.)

Source: K League
Rules for classification: 1) Points; 2) Goal difference; 3) Goals scored.
(R) Relegated

==== Results summary ====
Overall								Home						Away					
Pld	W	D	L	GF	GA	GD	Pts	W	D	L	GF	GA	GD	W	D	L	GF	GA	GD
20	4	7	9	29	36	−7	19	2	4	4	14	13	+1	2	3	5	15	23	−8

==== Results by round ====
Round	1	2	3	4	5	6	7	8	9	10	11	12	13	14	15	16	17	18	19	20	21	22	23	24	25	26	27	28	29	30	31	32	33	34	35	36	37	38	39	40	41	42	43	44
Ground	A	H	H	A	H	H	A	A	A	A	H	A	H	A	H	H	H	H	A	A																								
Result	W	D	W	W	D	L	D	D	L	L	D	L	L	L	L	D	W	L	L	D																								
Position	4	7	4	2	2	6	6	6	8	9	9	11	11	13	12	12	12	12	12	13																								

Updated to match(es) played on 12 July 2012. Source: League Fixtures and Results
A = Away; H = Home; W = Win; D = Draw; L = Loss

=== Korean FA Cup ===
23 May Round of 32	Chungju Hummel	2–4	Gwangju FC	Chungju, Chungbuk
19:00 KST	Kim Seong-Jun 44'; Kang Du-Ho 71' (pen.)		Ahn Sung-Nam 27'; Milić 45+2'; Milić 62' (Assist by No.9); Lee Han-Saem 77' (Assist by No.37)	Stadium: Chungju Stadium; Attendance: 3,500

20 June Round of 16	Pohang Steelers	3–1	Gwangju FC	Pohang, Gyeongbuk
19:30 KST	No Byung-Jun 22', 90+'; Ko Mu-Yeol 59'		Park Jeong-Min 43' (Assist by No.17)	Stadium: Pohang Steel Yard; Attendance: 2,875; Referee: Song Min-Seok

== Squad statistics ==
=== Appearances ===
Statistics accurate as of match played 27 June 2012

No.	Nat.	Pos.	Name	League		FA Cup		Appearances		Goals
No.	Nat.	Pos.	Name	Apps	Goals	Apps	Goals	App (sub)	Total	Goals
1	(South Korea)	GK	Park Ho-Jin	16	0	1	0	17 (0)	17	0
2	(South Korea)	DF	Jeong Woo-In	16	0	1	0	17 (0)	17	0
3	(South Korea)	DF	Jang Kyung-Jin	5	0	1	0	6 (0)	6	0
4	(South Korea)	DF	Lee Yong	5 (3)	0	1	0	6 (3)	9	0
5	(South Korea)	DF	Lim Sun-Young	5 (6)	1	1	0	6 (6)	12	1
6	(South Korea)	MF	Kim Eun-Sun	16	5	1	0	17 (0)	17	5
7	(South Korea)	MF	Lee Seung-Gi	16	0	1	0	17 (0)	17	0
8	(South Korea)	MF	An Dong-Hyeok	6 (4)	0	0	0	6 (4)	10	0
9	(South Korea)	FW	Kim Dong-Sub	12 (1)	4	1	0	13 (1)	14	4
10	(South Korea)	FW	Park Gi-Dong	5 (3)	0	0 (1)	0	5 (4)	9	0
11	(South Korea)	MF	Jo Woo-Jin	0 (8)	1	0 (1)	0	0 (9)	9	1
13	(South Korea)	FW	Kim Ho-Nam	0	0	0	0	0	0	0
14	(South Korea)	FW	Yoo Dong-Min	0 (1)	0	1	0	1 (1)	2	0
15	(South Korea)	DF	Yoo Jong-Hyun	13	0	2	0	15 (0)	15	0
16	(South Korea)	DF	Lee Han-Saem	6 (2)	1	1	1	7 (2)	9	2
17	(South Korea)	MF	Park Hyun	1 (4)	1	0 (1)	0	1 (5)	6	1
18	(South Korea)	FW	Park Jeong-Min	0 (2)	0	1	1	1 (2)	3	1
19	(South Korea)	MF	Park Hee-Sung	7	0	0	0	7 (0)	7	0
20	(South Korea)	DF	Kang Min	0	0	1	0	1 (0)	1	0
21	(South Korea)	GK	Yoon Gi-Hae	0	0	0	0	0	0	0
22	(South Korea)	DF	Kim Soo-Beom	17	0	1	0	18 (0)	18	0
23	(South Korea)	MF	Park Min	4	2	0 (1)	0	4 (1)	5	2
24	(South Korea)	DF	Park Yo-Han	2 (1)	0	2	0	4 (1)	5	0
25	(South Korea)	MF	Yeo Reum	0	0	0	0	0	0	0
26	(South Korea)	DF	Noh Haeng-Seok	0	0	0	0	0	0	0
27	(South Korea)	DF	Lim Ha-Ram	12	0	1	0	13 (0)	13	0
28	(South Korea)	FW	Park Jong-In	0	0	0 (1)	0	0 (1)	1	0
29	(South Korea)	MF	Moon Du-Yun	0	0	0	0	0	0	0
31	(South Korea)	GK	Lee Jung-Rae	2	0	1	0	3 (0)	3	0
34	(South Korea)	MF	Ahn Sung-Nam	12 (1)	0	2	1	14 (1)	15	1
37	(Brazil)	FW	João Paulo	3 (14)	6	0 (1)	0	3 (15)	18	6
38	(South Korea)	MF	Yoon Min-Ho	0	0	0	0	0	0	0
99	(Montenegro)	FW	Bogdan Milić	17	4	1	2	18 (0)	18	6
80	(Brazil)	FW	Adriano Chuva (out)	0 (3)	1	0	0	0 (3)	3	1

=== Goals and assists ===
Rank	Nation	Number	Name	K-League		KFA Cup		Sum		Total
Rank	Nation	Number	Name	Goals	Assists	Goals	Assists	Goals	Assists	Total
1	(Brazil)	37	João Paulo	6	3	0	1	6	4	10
2	(Montenegro)	99	Bogdan Milić	4	2	2	0	6	2	8
3	(South Korea)	7	Lee Seung-Gi	0	7	0	0	0	7	7
4	(South Korea)	6	Kim Eun-Sun	5	1	0	0	5	1	6
5	(South Korea)	9	Kim Dong-Sub	4	0	0	1	4	1	5
6	(South Korea)	22	Kim Soo-Beom	0	4	0	0	0	4	4
7	(South Korea)	23	Park Min	2	0	0	0	2	0	2
=	(South Korea)	16	Lee Han-Saem	1	0	1	0	2	0	2
=	(South Korea)	17	Park Hyun	1	0	0	1	1	1	2
=	(South Korea)	10	Park Gi-Dong	0	2	0	0	0	2	2
8	(South Korea)	5	Lim Sun-Young	1	0	0	0	1	0	1
=	(South Korea)	11	Jo Woo-Jin	1	0	0	0	1	0	1
=	(Brazil)	80	Adriano Chuva	1	0	0	0	1	0	1
=	(South Korea)	18	Park Jeong-Min	0	0	1	0	1	0	1
=	(South Korea)	34	Ahn Sung-Nam	0	0	1	0	1	0	1
/	/	/	Own Goals	0	-	0	-	0	-	0
/	/	/	TOTALS	26	19	5	3	31	22	

=== Discipline ===
Position	Nation	Number	Name	K-League		KFA Cup		Total	
Position	Nation	Number	Name	Yellow card	Red card	Yellow card	Red card	Yellow card	Red card
DF	(South Korea)	2	Jeong Woo-In	8	1	0	0	8	1
DF	(South Korea)	3	Jang Kyung-Jin	2	0	0	0	2	0
DF	(South Korea)	4	Lee Yong	3	0	0	0	3	0
MF	(South Korea)	6	Kim Eun-Sun	6	0	1	0	7	0
MF	(South Korea)	7	Lee Seung-Gi	0	0	1	0	1	0
MF	(South Korea)	8	An Dong-Hyeok	3	0	0	0	3	0
FW	(South Korea)	9	Kim Dong-Sub	4	0	0	0	4	0
MF	(South Korea)	11	Jo Woo-Jin	1	0	0	0	1	0
DF	(South Korea)	15	Yoo Jong-Hyun	4	0	0	0	4	0
DF	(South Korea)	16	Lee Han-Saem	3	0	1	0	4	0
FW	(South Korea)	18	Park Jeong-Min	1	0	0	0	1	0
DF	(South Korea)	20	Kang Min	0	0	1	0	1	0
DF	(South Korea)	22	Kim Soo-Beom	5	0	1	0	6	0
DF	(South Korea)	24	Park Yo-Han	0	0	1	0	1	0
DF	(South Korea)	27	Lim Ha-Ram	2	0	0	0	2	0
GK	(South Korea)	31	Lee Jung-Rae	0	0	1	0	1	0
MF	(South Korea)	34	Ahn Sung-Nam	2	0	0	0	2	0
FW	(Brazil)	37	João Paulo	3	0	0	0	3	0
FW	(Montenegro)	99	Bogdan Milić	5	0	0	0	5	0
/	/	/	TOTALS	52	1	7	0	59	1
