= 2011 Gwangju FC season =

Gwangju FC
2011 season
- Chairman: Kang Woon-Tae (Mayor)
- Manager: Choi Man-Hee
- K-League: 11th
- Korean FA Cup: Round of 32
- League Cup: Group round
- Top goalscorer: League: Lee Seung-Ki (8); João Paulo (8); All: Lee Seung-Ki (8); João Paulo (8)
- Highest home attendance: 36,241 vs Gyeongnam (March 5)
- Lowest home attendance: 457 vs Suwon City (May 18)
- Average home league attendance: 7,429
Home colours	Away colours

The 2011 season was Gwangju FC's first ever season in the K-League in South Korea. Gwangju FC will be competing in K-League, League Cup and Korean FA Cup.

== Current squad ==
Note: Flags indicate national team as defined under FIFA eligibility rules; some limited exceptions apply. Players may hold more than one non-FIFA nationality.

No.	Pos.	Nation	Player
1	GK	KOR	Park Ho-Jin
2	DF	KOR	Jeong Woo-In
3	DF	KOR	Park Byeong-Ju
4	DF	KOR	Lee Yong
5	DF	KOR	Lim Sun-Young
6	MF	KOR	Kim Eun-sun (vice-captain)
7	MF	KOR	Lee Seung-Ki
8	MF	KOR	An Dong-Hyeok
9	FW	KOR	Kim Dong-Sub
10	FW	KOR	Park Gi-Dong (captain)
11	MF	KOR	Jo Woo-Jin
13	MF	KOR	Kim Ho-Nam
14	FW	KOR	Yoo Dong-Min
15	FW	KOR	Yoo Jong-Hyun
16	FW	KOR	Kim Sung-Min
17	MF	KOR	Park Hyun
18	MF	KOR	Kim Hong-Il
19	MF	KOR	Park Hee-Sung

No.	Pos.	Nation	Player
20	DF	KOR	Koh Eun-Seong
21	GK	KOR	Jo Sang-Jun
22	DF	KOR	Kim Soo-Beom
23	MF	KOR	Park Sung-Hwa
24	DF	KOR	Park Yo-Han
25	FW	KOR	Kim Sung-Min
26	DF	KOR	Noh Haeng-Seok
27	DF	KOR	Lim Ha-Ram
28	MF	KOR	Yoon Kwang-Bok
30	MF	KOR	Kim Sung-Min
31	DF	KOR	Heo Jae-Won
32	MF	KOR	Park Sang-Hyeon
34	MF	KOR	Ahn Sung-Nam (on loan from Gangwon)
35	MF	KOR	Lee Jae-Chan
36	FW	BRA	Celin
37	FW	BRA	João Paulo
38	MF	KOR	Yoon Min-Ho

== Match results ==
=== K-League ===
Date Round	Home	Score	Away	Location

5 March 1	Gwangju	3–2	Gyeongnam	Seo-gu, Gwangju
15:00 UTC+9	Park Ki-Dong 51', 83'; Kim Dong-Sub 78' (pen.)	Report	Hwang Il-Soo 52'; Cho Hyung-Ik 61'	Stadium: Gwangju World Cup Stadium; Attendance: 36,241; Referee: Ko Keum-Bok

12 March 2	Suwon Samsung Bluewings	2–1	Gwangju	Suwon, Gyeonggi
15:00 UTC+9	Mato 75', 80' (pen.)	Report	Kim Dong-Sub (0:25)	Stadium: Suwon World Cup Stadium; Attendance: 31,506; Referee: Lee Sang-Yong

20 March 3	Ulsan Hyundai	2–1	Gwangju	Nam-gu, Ulsan
15:00 UTC+9	Kwak Tae-Hwi 67' (pen.), 86'	Report	Kim Dong-Sub 35'	Stadium: Munsu Cup Stadium; Attendance: 5,175; Referee: Yoo Seon-Ho

2 April 4	Gwangju	0–1	Pohang Steelers	Seo-gu, Gwangju
15:00 UTC+9		Report	Shin Hyung-Min 54'	Stadium: Gwangju World Cup Stadium; Attendance: 15,627; Referee: Choi Myung-Yong

9 April 5	Gwangju	0–0	Sangju Sangmu Phoenix	Seo-gu, Gwangju
15:00 UTC+9		Report		Stadium: Gwangju World Cup Stadium; Attendance: 7,253; Referee: Lee Sam-Ho

16 April 6	Jeonbuk Hyundai Motors	6–1	Gwangju	Jeonju, Jeonbuk
15:00 UTC+9	Kim Ji-Woong 17'; Kim Dong-Chan 27'; Lee Seung-Hyun 30'; Lee Dong-Gook 39'; Huang Bowen 42'; Lovrek 79'	Report	João Paulo 86'	Stadium: Jeonju World Cup Stadium; Attendance: 8,455; Referee: Lee Jong-Gook

24 April 7	Gwangju	1–0	Seoul	Seo-gu, Gwangju
15:00 UTC+9	João Paulo 34'; Kim Soo-Beom (yellow card) 55' (yellow-red card) 81'	Report		Stadium: Gwangju World Cup Stadium; Attendance: 4,127; Referee: Kim Dong-Jin

1 May 8	Gwangju	2–1	Daejeon Citizen	Seo-gu, Gwangju
15:00 UTC+9	Lee Seung-Ki 6'; João Paulo 34'	Report	Kim Chang-Hoon 42'	Stadium: Gwangju World Cup Stadium; Attendance: 2,515; Referee: Kim Jong-Hyuk

8 May 9	Gyeongnam	1–0	Gwangju	Geochang, Gyeongnam
19:00 UTC+9	Kim Young-Woo 75'	Report		Stadium: Geochang Sports Park; Attendance: 8,625; Referee: Ryu Hee-Seon

14 May 10	Gangwon	0–1	Gwangju	Gangneung, Gangwon
19:00 UTC+9		Report	Kim Dong-Sub 22'	Stadium: Gangneung Stadium; Attendance: 5,733; Referee: Lee Sam-Ho

22 May 11	Gwangju	0–1	Incheon United	Seo-gu, Gwangju
15:00 UTC+9		Report	Han Kyo-Won 73'	Stadium: Gwangju World Cup Stadium; Attendance: 7,210; Referee: Ko Keum-Bok

28 May 12	Busan I'Park	1–1	Gwangju	Yeonje-gu, Busan
19:00 UTC+9	Lim Sang-Hyub 65'	Report	João Paulo 90+4'	Stadium: Busan Asiad Stadium; Attendance: 6,564; Referee: Ahn Yong-Hee

11 June 13	Gwangju	2–0	Seongnam Ilhwa Chunma	Seo-gu, Gwangju
19:00 UTC+9	Lee Seung-Ki 77'; João Paulo 78'	Report		Stadium: Gwangju World Cup Stadium; Attendance: 4,132; Referee: Moon Jin-Hee

18 June 14	Gwangju	0–0	Chunnam Dragons	Seo-gu, Gwangju
19:00 UTC+9		Report		Stadium: Gwangju World Cup Stadium; Attendance: 4,086; Referee: Lee Sam-Ho

25 June 15	Jeju United	2–1	Gwangju	Seogwipo, Jeju
15:00 UTC+9	Santos 54'; Bae Ki-Jong 90+2'	Report	Yoo Dong-Min 90'	Stadium: Jeju World Cup Stadium; Attendance: 1,191; Referee: Ryu Hee-Sun

2 July 16	Incheon United	2–2	Gwangju	Seo-gu, Incheon
19:00 UTC+9	Park Jun-Tae 46'; Jeon Jae-Ho 72'	Report	Kim Dong-Sub 41'; João Paulo 83'	Stadium: Incheon Munhak Stadium; Attendance: 6,387; Referee: Lee Jong-Guk

9 July 17	Gwangju	2–0	Gangwon	Seo-gu, Gwangju
19:00 UTC+9	Lee Seung-Ki 28', 59'	Report		Stadium: Gwangju World Cup Stadium; Attendance: 9,876; Referee: Hong Jin-Ho

16 July 18	Gwangju	1–1	Jeonbuk Hyundai Motors	Seo-gu, Gwangju
19:00 UTC+9	Lee Seung-Ki 57'	Report	Kim Soo-Beom 62' (o.g.)	Stadium: Gwangju World Cup Stadium; Attendance: 3,248; Referee: Lim Won-Taek

23 July 19	Seoul	4–1	Gwangju	Mapo-gu, Seoul
20:00 UTC+9	Damjanović 5', 21'; Choi Jong-hoan 31'; Molina 41'	Report	Kim Dong-Sub 69'	Stadium: Seoul World Cup Stadium; Attendance: 21,124; Referee: Ko Keum-Bok

6 August 20	Gwangju	0–2	Gyeongnam	Seo-gu, Gwangju
19:00 UTC+9		Report	Seo Sang-Min 5'; Yoon Bit-Garam 69'	Stadium: Gwangju World Cup Stadium; Attendance: 2,874; Referee: Lee Sang-Yong

13 August 21	Sangju Sangmu Phoenix	2–0	Gwangju	Sangju, Gyeongbuk
19:30 UTC+9	Yoo Chang-Hyun 14'; Kim Jung-Woo 90+2'	Report		Stadium: Sangju Stadium; Attendance: 6,735; Referee: Ko Hyung-Jin

20 August 22	Daegu	Postponed	Gwangju	Buk-gu, Daegu
19:00 UTC+9				Stadium: Daegu Civil Stadium

27 August 23	Gwangju	2–2	Jeju United	Seo-gu, Gwangju
19:00 UTC+9	Lee Seung-Ki 11'; Heo Jae-Won 40'	Report	Kwon Yong-Nam 70'; Kim Eun-Jung 78'	Stadium: Gwangju World Cup Stadium; Attendance: 3,285; Referee: Ko Keum-Bok

10 September 24	Pohang Steelers	5–1	Gwangju	Pohang, Gyeongbuk
17:00 UTC+9	Mota 35' (pen.), 51'; Ko Moo-Yeol 55', 67'; No Byung-Jun 83'	Report	Park Gi-Dong 38'; Yoo Jong-Hyun (yellow card) 28' (yellow-red card) 34'	Stadium: Steelyard Stadium; Attendance: 10,165; Referee: Lee Min-Hu

17 September 25	Seongnam Ilhwa Chunma	1–3	Gwangju	Seongnam, Gyeonggi
19:00 UTC+9	Ognenovski (red card) 2'; Radončić 69'	Report	Lee Seung-Ki 3' (pen.); Kim Dong-Sub 43'; João Paulo 90+1'	Stadium: Tancheon Sports Complex; Attendance: 5,589; Referee: Kim Sang-Woo

25 September 26	Gwangju	2–2	Busan I'Park	Seo-gu, Gwangju
15:00 UTC+9	Lee Seung-Ki 60'; Yoo Jong-Hyun 90'	Report	Yoon Dong-Min 75'; Yang Dong-Hyun 80'	Stadium: Gwangju World Cup Stadium; Attendance: 3,156; Referee: Moon Jin-Hee

2 October 27	Gwangju	0–0	Ulsan Hyundai	Seo-gu, Gwangju
15:00 UTC+9		Report		Stadium: Gwangju World Cup Stadium; Attendance: 3,436; Referee: Ryu Hee-Sun

9 October Re-22	Daegu	1–2	Gwangju	Suseong-gu, Daegu
15:00 UTC+9	Yoo Kyoung-Youl 63'	Report	Jeong Woo-In 9'; Ahn Sung-Nam 36'	Stadium: Daegu Stadium; Attendance: 20,187; Referee: Choi Kwang-Bo

16 October 28	Chunnam Dragons	0–2	Gwangju	Gwangyang, Jeonnam
15:00 UTC+9		Report	João Paulo 73'; Ahn Sung-Nam 90'	Stadium: Gwangyang Stadium; Attendance: 6,235; Referee: Lee Sam-Ho

23 October 29	Gwangju	0–1	Suwon Samsung Bluewings	Seo-gu, Gwangju
15:00 UTC+9		Report	Ristić 9'; Shin Se-Gye (yellow card) 19' (yellow-red card) 88'	Stadium: Gwangju World Cup Stadium; Attendance: 24,778; Referee: Ahn Yong-Hee

30 October 30	Daejeon Citizen	1–0	Gwangju	Yuseong-gu, Daejeon
15:00 UTC+9	Baba 60'	Report	Park Byeong-Ju (red card) 90+3'	Stadium: Daejeon World Cup Stadium; Attendance: 17,441; Referee: Lim Won-Taek

==== League table ====
Pos	Team	Pld	W	D	L	GF	GA	GD	Pts	Qualification
9	Jeju United	30	10	10	10	44	45	−1	40	
10	Seongnam Ilhwa Chunma	30	9	8	13	43	47	−4	35	Qualification for the Champions League group stage (Note: Qualified as champions of the FA Cup.)
11	Gwangju FC	30	9	8	13	32	43	−11	35	
12	Daegu FC	30	8	9	13	35	46	−11	33	
13	Incheon United	30	6	14	10	31	40	−9	32	

Source: K League
Rules for classification: 1) Points; 2) Goal difference; 3) Goals scored
Notes:

Pos	Team	Qualification
1	Jeonbuk Hyundai Motors (C)	Qualification for the Champions League group stage
2	Ulsan Hyundai	Qualification for the Champions League group stage
3	Pohang Steelers	Qualification for the Champions League playoff round
4	Suwon Samsung Bluewings	
5	FC Seoul	
6	Busan IPark	

Source: RSSSF
(C) Champions

==== Results summary ====
Overall								Home						Away					
Pld	W	D	L	GF	GA	GD	Pts	W	D	L	GF	GA	GD	W	D	L	GF	GA	GD
30	9	8	13	32	43	−11	35	5	6	4	15	13	+2	4	2	9	17	30	−13

==== Results by round ====
Round	1	2	3	4	5	6	7	8	9	10	11	12	13	14	15	16	17	18	19	20	21	22	23	24	25	26	27	28	29	30
Ground	H	A	A	H	H	A	H	H	A	A	H	A	H	H	A	A	H	H	A	H	A	H	A	A	H	H	A	A	H	A
Result	W	L	L	L	D	L	W	W	L	W	L	D	W	D	L	D	W	D	L	L	L	D	L	W	D	D	W	W	L	L
Position	3	7	10	12	13	14	12	11	14	11	14	13	11	10	13	13	11	11	12	12	13	14	14	12	13	13	12	11	11	11

Updated to match(es) played on 30 October 2011. Source: League Fixtures and Results
A = Away; H = Home; W = Win; D = Draw; L = Loss

=== Korean FA Cup ===
18 May Round of 32	Gwangju FC	1–2 (a.e.t.)	Suwon City	Seo-gu, Gwangju
19:00 UTC+9	Yoo Jong-Hyun 58'		Park Jong-Chan 48'; Kim Han-Won 96'	Stadium: Gwangju World Cup Stadium; Attendance: 457

=== League Cup ===
16 March Group round	Gangwon FC	5–0	Gwangju FC	Chuncheon, Gangwon
19:00 UTC+9	Seo Dong-Hyun 50'; Kwon Soon-Hyung 66'; Kim Young-Hoo 85', 90+2'; Lee Chang-Hoon 90'	Report		Stadium: Chuncheon Stadium; Attendance: 2,320; Referee: Lim Won-Taek

6 April Group round	Busan I'Park	1–0	Gwangju FC	Yeonje-gu, Busan
19:00 UTC+9	Han Ji-Ho 82'	Report		Stadium: Busan Asiad Stadium; Attendance: 1,502; Referee: Kim Sang-Woo

20 April Group round	Gwangju FC	0–2	Chunnam Dragons	Seo-gu, Gwangju
19:00 UTC+9		Report	Cornthwaite 33'; Nam Joon-Jae 90+3'	Stadium: Gwangju World Cup Stadium; Attendance: 847; Referee: Kim Seong-Ho

5 May Group round	Sangju Sangmu Phoenix	2–3	Gwangju FC	Sangju, Gyeongbuk
15:00 UTC+9	Kim Dong-hyun 23'; Kim Jung-Woo 61'	Report	Kim Sung-Min 12'; Yoo Dong-Min 58'; Kim Sung-Min 90+1'	Stadium: Sangju Stadium; Attendance: 8,972; Referee: Choi Kwang-Bo

11 May Group round	Gwangju FC	1–2	Ulsan Hyundai	Seo-gu, Gwangju
15:00 UTC+9	Yoo Jong-Hyun 13'	Report	Kim Shin-Wook 8', 38'	Stadium: Gwangju World Cup Stadium; Attendance: 568; Referee: An Yong-Hee

== Squad statistics ==
=== Appearances and goals ===
Statistics accurate as of match played 30 October 2011
Numbers in parentheses denote appearances as substitute.

No.	Nat.	Pos.	Name	League		FA Cup		League Cup		Total	
No.	Nat.	Pos.	Name	Apps	Goals	Apps	Goals	Apps	Goals	Apps	Goals
1	KOR	GK	Park Ho-Jin	30	0	1	0	1	0	32 (0)	0
2	KOR	DF	Jeong Woo-In	20 (2)	1	1	0	1	0	22 (2)	1
3	KOR	DF	Park Byeong-Ju	20 (1)	0	0	0	2	0	22 (1)	0
4	KOR	DF	Lee Yong	27	0	0	0	2	0	29 (0)	0
5	KOR	DF	Lim Sun-Young	10 (6)	0	1	0	4 (1)	0	15 (7)	0
6	KOR	MF	Kim Eun-sun	24	0	1	0	3	0	28 (0)	0
7	KOR	MF	Lee Seung-Ki	25	8	0 (1)	0	2	0	27 (1)	8
8	KOR	MF	An Dong-Hyeok	6 (12)	0	1	0	3	0	10 (12)	0
9	KOR	FW	Kim Dong-Sub	23	7	0 (1)	0	2 (2)	0	25 (3)	7
10	KOR	FW	Park Gi-Dong	27	3	1	0	3 (1)	0	31 (1)	3
11	KOR	MF	Jo Woo-Jin	0 (8)	0	0	0	0 (3)	0	0 (11)	0
13	KOR	MF	Kim Ho-Nam	0	0	0	0	1 (1)	0	1 (1)	0
14	KOR	FW	Yoo Dong-Min	1 (15)	1	0	0	0 (2)	1	1 (17)	2
15	KOR	FW	Yoo Jong-Hyun	20 (3)	1	1	1	3	1	24 (3)	3
16	KOR	FW	Kim Sung-Min	0	0	0	0	1 (1)	1	1 (1)	1
17	KOR	MF	Park Hyun	1 (1)	0	1	0	3	0	5 (1)	0
18	KOR	MF	Kim Hong-Il	0 (1)	0	0	0	1	0	1 (1)	0
19	KOR	MF	Park Hee-Sung	19 (4)	0	1	0	4	0	24 (4)	0
20	KOR	DF	Ko Eun-Seong	0	0	0	0	1	0	1 (0)	0
21	KOR	GK	Jo Sang-Jun	0	0	0	0	0	0	0	0
22	KOR	DF	Kim Soo-Beom	16 (4)	0	0 (1)	0	3	0	19 (5)	0
23	KOR	MF	Park Sung-Hwa	0	0	0	0	0	0	0	0
24	KOR	DF	Park Yo-Han	0	0	0	0	0	0	0	0
25	KOR	FW	Kim Sung-Min	0 (3)	0	0	0	0 (1)	1	0 (4)	1
26	KOR	DF	No Haeng-Seok	0	0	0	0	1	0	1 (0)	0
27	KOR	DF	Lim Ha-Ram	7 (4)	0	1	0	3	0	11 (4)	0
28	KOR	MF	Yoon Kwang-Bok	0	0	0	0	0	0	0	0
30	KOR	MF	Kim Sung-Min	0	0	0	0	0	0	0	0
31	KOR	DF	Heo Jae-Won	26 (1)	1	0	0	2	0	28 (1)	1
32	KOR	DF	Park Sang-Hyeon	0	0	0	0	0	0	0	0
34	KOR	MF	Ahn Sung-Nam	19 (2)	2	0 (1)	0	1	0	20 (3)	2
35	KOR	MF	Lee Jae-Chan	0	0	0	0	0	0	0	0
36	BRA	FW	Celin	1	0	0	0	0	0	1 (0)	0
37	BRA	FW	João Paulo	7 (20)	8	1	0	2 (1)	0	10 (21)	8
38	KOR	MF	Yoon Min-Ho	0	0	0	0	0	0	0	0
33	KOR	GK	Sung Kyung-Mo (out)	0	0	0	0	4	0	4 (0)	0
36	BRA	FW	Vinícius Lopes (out)	1 (1)	0	0	0	2 (1)	0	3 (2)	0

=== Top scorers ===
Rank	Nation	Number	Name	K-League	KFA Cup	League Cup	Total
1	(South Korea)	7	Lee Seung-Ki	8	0	0	8
=	(Brazil)	37	João Paulo	8	0	0	8
2	(South Korea)	9	Kim Dong-Sub	7	0	0	7
3	(South Korea)	10	Park Gi-Dong	3	0	0	3
=	(South Korea)	15	Yoo Jong-Hyun	1	1	1	3
4	(South Korea)	34	Ahn Sung-Nam	2	0	0	2
=	(South Korea)	14	Yoo Dong-Min	1	0	1	2
5	(South Korea)	2	Jeong Woo-In	1	0	0	1
=	(South Korea)	31	Heo Jae-Won	1	0	0	1
=	(South Korea)	16	Kim Sung-Min	0	0	1	1
=	(South Korea)	25	Kim Sung-Min	0	0	1	1
/	/	/	Own Goals	0	0	0	0
/	/	/	TOTALS	32	1	4	37

=== Top assistors ===
Rank	Nation	Number	Name	K-League	KFA Cup	League Cup	Total
1	(South Korea)	10	Park Gi-Dong	5	0	0	5
2	(South Korea)	22	Kim Soo-Beom	3	0	0	3
=	(South Korea)	17	Park Hyun	1	1	1	3
3	(South Korea)	7	Lee Seung-Ki	2	0	0	2
=	(South Korea)	9	Kim Dong-Sub	2	0	0	2
4	(South Korea)	5	Lim Sun-Young	1	0	0	1
=	(South Korea)	6	Kim Eun-sun	1	0	0	1
=	(South Korea)	8	An Dong-Hyeok	1	0	0	1
=	(South Korea)	15	Yoo Jong-Hyun	1	0	0	1
=	(South Korea)	19	Park Hee-Sung	1	0	0	1
=	(South Korea)	31	Heo Jae-Won	1	0	0	1
=	(Brazil)	37	João Paulo	1	0	0	1
=	(South Korea)	11	Jo Woo-Jin	0	0	1	1
=	(South Korea)	18	Kim Hong-Il	0	0	1	1
/	/	/	TOTALS	20	1	3	24

=== Discipline ===
Position	Nation	Number	Name	K-League		KFA Cup		League Cup		Total	
Position	Nation	Number	Name	Booked	Sent off (straight red)	Booked	Sent off (straight red)	Booked	Sent off (straight red)	Booked	Sent off (straight red)
GK	(South Korea)	1	Park Ho-Jin	2	0	0	0	0	0	2	0
DF	(South Korea)	2	Jeong Woo-In	4	0	1	0	0	0	5	0
DF	(South Korea)	3	Park Byeong-Ju	6	1	0	0	0	0	6	1
DF	(South Korea)	4	Lee Yong	4	0	0	0	0	0	4	0
DF	(South Korea)	5	Lim Sun-Young	2	0	0	0	0	0	2	0
MF	(South Korea)	6	Kim Eun-sun	7	0	0	0	1	0	8	0
MF	(South Korea)	8	An Dong-Hyeok	2	0	0	0	0	0	2	0
FW	(South Korea)	9	Kim Dong-Sub	2	0	0	0	1	0	3	0
FW	(South Korea)	10	Park Gi-Dong	2	0	0	0	0	0	2	0
MF	(South Korea)	13	Kim Ho-Nam	0	0	0	0	1	0	1	0
FW	(South Korea)	15	Yoo Jong-Hyun	11	1	1	0	2	0	14	1
MF	(South Korea)	17	Park Hyun	0	0	1	0	0	0	1	0
MF	(South Korea)	19	Park Hee-Sung	1	0	0	0	0	0	1	0
DF	(South Korea)	20	Ko Eun-Seong	0	0	0	0	1	0	1	0
DF	(South Korea)	22	Kim Soo-Beom	7	1	0	0	0	0	7	1
DF	(South Korea)	27	Lim Ha-Ram	3	0	0	0	2	0	5	0
DF	(South Korea)	31	Heo Jae-Won	8	0	0	0	0	0	8	0
GK	(South Korea)	33	Sung Kyung-Mo	0	0	0	0	1	0	1	0
MF	(South Korea)	34	Ahn Sung-Nam	2	0	0	0	1	0	3	0
FW	(Brazil)	37	João Paulo	0	0	0	0	1	0	1	0
/	/	/	TOTALS	63	3	3	0	11	0	77	3

== Transfer ==
=== In ===
Date	Pos.	Name	From	Note
2 November 2010	DF	(South Korea) Lim Ha-Ram	(South Korea) Yonsei University	Draft (Priority)
2 November 2010	DF	(South Korea) Kim Soo-Beom	(South Korea) Sangji University	Draft (Priority)
2 November 2010	DF	(South Korea) Lee Yong	(South Korea) Korea University	Draft (Priority)
2 November 2010	MF	(South Korea) Park Hyun	(South Korea) University of Incheon	Draft (Priority)
2 November 2010	MF	(South Korea) Park Hee-Sung	(South Korea) Honam University	Draft (Priority)
2 November 2010	MF	(South Korea) Lee Seung-Ki	(South Korea) University of Ulsan	Draft (Priority)
2 November 2010	MF	(South Korea) Kim Eun-Seon	(South Korea) Daegu University	Draft (Priority)
2 November 2010	MF	(South Korea) Im Seon-Yeong	(South Korea) University of Suwon	Draft (Priority)
2 November 2010	MF	(South Korea) Ahn Dong-Hyuk	(South Korea) Kwangwoon University	Draft (Priority)
2 November 2010	MF	(South Korea) Jo Woo-Jin	(South Korea) Mokpo City FC	Draft (Priority)
2 November 2010	FW	(South Korea) Yoo Jong-Hyun	(South Korea) Konkuk University	Draft (Priority)
2 November 2010	FW	(South Korea) Yoo Dong-Min	(South Korea) Chodang University	Draft (Priority)
2 November 2010	FW	(South Korea) Park Ki-Dong	(Japan) FC Gifu	Draft (Priority)
2 November 2010	FW	(South Korea) Kim Dong-Sub	(Japan) Tokushima Vortis	Draft (Priority)
9 November 2010	MF	(South Korea) Kim Ho-Nam	(Japan) Sagan Tosu	Draft (1st)
9 November 2010	DF	(South Korea) Jung Woo-In	(South Korea) Yongin City FC	Draft (2nd)
9 November 2010	DF	(South Korea) Park Yo-Han	(South Korea) Yonsei University	Draft (4th)
9 November 2010	DF	(South Korea) Ko Eun-Seong	(South Korea) Dankook University	Draft (5th)
9 November 2010	DF	(South Korea) No Haeng-Seok	(South Korea) Dongguk University	Draft (6th)
9 November 2010	MF	(South Korea) Lee Jae-Chan	(South Korea) Chosun University	Draft (Extra)
9 November 2010	GK	(South Korea) Jo Sang-Joon	(South Korea) Daegu University	Draft (Extra)
9 November 2010	FW	(South Korea) Kim Sung-Min	(South Korea) Honam University	Draft (Extra)
9 November 2010	MF	(South Korea) Park Sung-Hwa	(South Korea) Chosun University	Draft (Extra)
9 November 2010	MF	(South Korea) Yoon Kwang-Bok	(South Korea) Chosun University	Draft (Extra)
9 November 2010	DF	(South Korea) Kang Min-Seong	(South Korea) Chosun University	Draft (Extra)
4 January 2011	GK	(South Korea) Park Ho-Jin	(South Korea) Suwon Samsung Bluewings	Transfer
4 January 2011	MF	(South Korea) Kim Hong-Il	(South Korea) Suwon Samsung Bluewings	Transfer
4 January 2011	GK	(South Korea) Sung Kyung-Mo	(South Korea) Incheon United	Transfer
4 January 2011	FW	(South Korea) Kim Sung-Min	(South Korea) Ulsan Hyundai Mipo Dockyard	Transfer
4 January 2011	DF	(South Korea) Park Byeong-Ju	(South Korea) Suwon City FC	Transfer
4 January 2011	MF	(South Korea) Park Sang-Hyeon	(South Korea) Seongnam Ilhwa Chunma	Free Agent
18 January 2011	MF	(South Korea) Ahn Sung-Nam	(South Korea) Gangwon FC	Loan
18 January 2011	DF	(South Korea) Heo Jae-Won	(South Korea) Suwon Samsung Bluewings	Transfer
20 February 2011	FW	(Brazil) João Paulo	(Brazil) ABC Futebol Clube	Transfer
20 February 2011	FW	(Brazil) Vinícius Lopes	(Sweden) BK Häcken	Transfer
27 July 2011	FW	(Brazil) Celin	(Brazil) ASA	Transfer

=== Out ===
Date	Pos.	Name	To	Note
14 June 2011	FW	(Brazil) Vinícius Lopes	Free Agent	
17 June 2011	GK	(South Korea) Sung Kyung-Mo	released (termination of contract)	
