= 2010 Korea National League Championship =

Tournament details
- Country: South Korea
- Cities: Donghae, Gangwon
- Dates: 26 July – 6 August 2010
- Teams: 15

Final positions
- Champions: Busan Transportation Corporation (1st title)
- Runners-up: Hyundai Mipo Dockyard

Tournament statistics
- Top goal scorer: Wesley Alex (6 goals)

Awards
- Best player: Lee Yong-seung

The 2010 Korea National League Championship was the seventh competition of the Korea National League Championship.

== Group stage ==
=== Group A ===
Pos	Team	Pld	W	D	L	GF	GA	GD	Pts
1	Hyundai Mipo Dockyard	2	1	1	0	5	1	+4	4
2	Goyang KB Kookmin Bank	2	1	1	0	4	3	+1	4
3	Hyundai Mipo Dockyard	2	0	0	2	2	7	−5	0

Source: Report
26 July 2010

Goyang KB Kookmin Bank	3–2	Chungju Hummel
Lee Sang-woo 45'; Sung Ho-sang 45+3'; Park Byung-won 82'		Lee Hae-jeong 32'; Kang Seok-goo 90+2'

Donghae Sub 1 Stadium, Donghae

28 July 2010

Goyang KB Kookmin Bank	1–1	Hyundai Mipo Dockyard
Don Ji-deok 90+3'		Lee Jin-woo 61'

Donghae Sub 1 Stadium, Donghae

30 July 2010

Hyundai Mipo Dockyard	4–0	Chungju Hummel
Park Jong-woo 9'; Wesley Alex 18', 42'; Kim Sung-min 72'

Donghae Sub 1 Stadium, Donghae

=== Group B ===
Pos	Team	Pld	W	D	L	GF	GA	GD	Pts
1	Yongin City	3	2	0	1	8	5	+3	6
2	Gangneung City	3	1	2	0	3	2	+1	5
3	Incheon Korail	3	1	1	1	5	4	+1	4
4	Gimhae City	3	0	1	2	1	6	−5	1

Source: Report
26 July 2010

Gangneung City	1–1	Gimhae City
Kim Jang-hyun 79'		Yoon Tae-hyun 80'

Donghae Sub 1 Stadium, Donghae

26 July 2010

Yongin City	4–3	Incheon Korail
Jeong Woo-in 24'; Do Jae-joon 60', 82'; Shin Young-joon 79'		Lee Kyung-min 57'; Shin Eun-yeol 61'; Ha Seung-ryong 68'

Dongbu Metal Stadium, Donghae

28 July 2010

Gangneung City	2–1	Yongin City
Jin Chang-soo 59'; Kim Jin-seok 88'		Kim Jin-seok 81' (o.g.)

Dongbu Metal Stadium, Donghae

28 July 2010

Gimhae City	0–2	Incheon Korail
		Jang Moon-kwan 27'; Heo Sin-young 45'

Donghae Sub 1 Stadium, Donghae

30 July 2010

Incheon Korail	0–0	Gangneung City

Dongbu Metal Stadium, Donghae

30 July 2010

Yongin City	3–0	Gimhae City
Jeong Woo-in 69', 71'; Choi Jae-woong 87'

Donghae Sub 1 Stadium, Donghae

=== Group C ===
Pos	Team	Pld	W	D	L	GF	GA	GD	Pts
1	Daejeon KHNP	3	2	0	1	7	2	+5	6
2	Ansan Hallelujah	3	2	0	1	5	3	+2	6
3	Changwon City	3	2	0	1	7	6	+1	6
4	Yesan FC	3	0	0	3	5	13	−8	0

Source: Report
27 July 2010

Daejeon KHNP	2–0	Changwon City
Jo Hyung-jae 84'; Kim Young-nam 86'

Donghae Sub 1 Stadium, Donghae

27 July 2010

Ansan Hallelujah	3–1	Yesan FC
Han Young-goo 2'; Lee Do-seong 56'; Hong Ji-in 79'		Kim Kwan-sik 15'

Dongbu Metal Stadium, Donghae

29 July 2010

Daejeon KHNP	0–2	Ansan Hallelujah
		Hong Ji-in 62'; Han Young-goo 73'

Dongbu Metal Stadium, Donghae

29 July 2010

Changwon City	5–4	Yesan FC
Kim Joon-tae 13', 80'; Sim Jong-bo 25'; Kim Je-hwan 39'; Song Geun-soo 53'		Park Ki-hwan 5'; Song Seul-ki 65'; Lee Byung-yoon 85'; Kim Tae-bong 90+3'

Donghae Sub 1 Stadium, Donghae

31 July 2010

Yesan FC	0–5	Daejeon KHNP
		Kim Young-nam 2'; Jo Hyung-jae 39'; Hwang Eun-chan 48'; Lee Seung-hwan 74'; Kim Dong-woo 77'

Dongbu Metal Stadium, Donghae

31 July 2010

Ansan Hallelujah	0–2	Changwon City
		Kim Joon-tae 35'; Song Geun-soo 86'

Donghae Sub 1 Stadium, Donghae

=== Group D ===
Pos	Team	Pld	W	D	L	GF	GA	GD	Pts
1	Busan Transportation Corporation	3	2	0	1	5	5	0	6
2	Suwon City	3	1	2	0	6	4	+2	5
3	Mokpo City	3	1	1	1	4	4	0	4
4	Cheonan City	3	0	1	2	0	2	−2	1

Source: Report
27 July 2010

Suwon City	4–2	Busan Transportation Corporation
Yoon Dong-min 15', 44'; Jang Hyeok 17', 33'		Cha Cheol-ho 76', 88'

Donghae Sub 1 Stadium, Donghae

27 July 2010

Mokpo City	1–0	Cheonan City
Hong Deok-jong 4'

Dongbu Metal Stadium, Donghae

29 July 2010

Suwon City	2–2	Mokpo City
Jang Hyeok 77'; Park Byeong-ju 81'		Hong Deok-jong 37', 59'

Dongbu Metal Stadium, Donghae

29 July 2010

Busan Transportation Corporation	1–0	Cheonan City
Cha Cheol-ho 32'

Donghae Sub 1 Stadium, Donghae

31 July 2010

Cheonan City	0–0	Suwon City

Dongbu Metal Stadium, Donghae

31 July 2010

Mokpo City	1–2	Busan Transportation Corporation
Hwang Soon-min 39'		Kang Sung-bok 38'; Cha Cheol-ho 51'

Donghae Sub 1 Stadium, Donghae

== Knockout stage ==
=== Bracket ===
Quarter-finals
Hyundai Mipo Dockyard	4
Ansan Hallelujah	1
Yongin City	0 (1)
Suwon City (p)	0 (3)
Daejeon KHNP	0
Goyang KB Kookmin Bank	2
Busan Transportation Corporation	4
Gangneung City	1

Semi-finals
Hyundai Mipo Dockyard	2
Suwon City	0
Goyang KB Kookmin Bank	0
Busan Transportation Corporation	2

Final
Hyundai Mipo Dockyard	1
Busan Transportation Corporation	2

=== Quarter-finals ===
2 August 2010
15:00 KST

Hyundai Mipo Dockyard	4–1	Ansan Hallelujah
Bu Young-tae 46'; Wesley Alex 52', 65'; Han Sang-min 53'	Report	Yoon Hyung-tae 79'

Dongbu Metal Stadium, Donghae

2 August 2010
15:00 KST

Yongin City	0–0	Suwon City
	Report
Penalties
	1–3

Donghae Stadium, Donghae

2 August 2010
17:00 KST

Daejeon KHNP	0–2	Goyang KB Kookmin Bank
	Report	Sung Ho-sang 81'; Kim Yeon-gun 90'

Dongbu Metal Stadium, Donghae

2 August 2010
17:00 KST

Busan Transportation Corporation	4–1	Gangneung City
Lee Yong-seung 16', 70'; Park Hyuk-soon 45+2'; Cha Cheol-ho 90+3'	Report	Jin Chang-soo 84'

Donghae Stadium, Donghae

=== Semi-finals ===
4 August 2010
14:00 KST

Hyundai Mipo Dockyard	2–0	Suwon City
Wesley Alex 48'; Vinicius 57'	Report

Donghae Stadium, Donghae

4 August 2010
16:00 KST

Goyang KB Kookmin Bank	0–2	Busan Transportation Corporation
	Report	Lee Yong-seung 5', 74'

Donghae Stadium, Donghae

=== Final ===
6 August 2010
14:00 KST

Hyundai Mipo Dockyard	1–2	Busan Transportation Corporation
Wesley Alex 78'	Report	Lee Yong-seung 75'; Jang Ji-soo 87'

Donghae Stadium, Donghae

== See also ==
- 2010 in South Korean football
- 2010 Korea National League
