= Kim Min-jun =

Kim Min-jun or Kim Min-joon (김민준) may refer to:

- Kim Min-june (footballer, born January 1994), South Korean footballer, playing for Gimhae
- Kim Min-jun (footballer, born March 1994), South Korean footballer, playing for Busan Transportation Corporation
- Kim Min-jun (footballer, born January 2000), South Korean footballer, playing for Gyeongnam
- Kim Min-jun (footballer, born February 2000), South Korean footballer, playing for Gangwon
- Kim Min-jun (actor) (born 1976), South Korean actor
- Kim Min-jun (cyclist), South Korean cyclist who competed at the 2010 Asian Junior Cycling Championships
- Jun. K (Kim Min-jun; born 1988), South Korean musical artist

== See also ==
- Kim Jung-min (disambiguation)
