= Park Jung-min =

Park Jung-min and Park Jeong-min is a Korean name consisting of the family name Park and the given name Jung-min, and may also refer to:

- Park Jung-min (actor) (born 1987), South Korean actor
- Park Jung-min (singer) (born 1987), South Korean singer and a member of SS501
- Park Jeong-min (footballer) (born 1988), South Korean footballer
