= Kim Hong-il =

Kim Hong-il may refer to:

- Kim Hong-il (1948–2019), Korean politician, son of President Kim Dae-jung
- Kim Hong-il (footballer) (born 1987), footballer for Sangju Sangmu Phoenix
- Kim Hong-il (general) (1898–1980), general and South Korean politician
