= Kim Dae-ho =

Kim Dae-ho is the name of:

- Kim Dae-ho (footballer, born 1988)
- Kim Dae-ho (footballer, born 1994), now known as Kim Min-jun
