= Kim Boo-gwan =

South Korean footballer (born 1990)

Personal information
- Full name: Kim Boo-gwan
- Date of birth: 3 September 1990 (age 36)
- Place of birth: South Korea
- Height: 1.72 m (5 ft 7 1/2 in)
- Position: Winger

Team information
- Current team: Busan TC

Youth career
- 2009–2011: Gwangju University

Senior career*
Years	Team	Apps	(Gls)
2012–2014	Gimhae FC	71	(5)
2015–	Suwon FC	55	(4)
2017–2018	→ Asan Mugunghwa (army)	9	(1)
2019–	→ Busan TC (loan)	16	(0)
- * Club domestic league appearances and goals as of 29 November 2019

Kim Boo-gwan (Korean: 김부관; born 3 September 1990) is a South Korean footballer who plays as winger for Busan TC in Korea National League.

== Career ==
Kim signed with Korea National League side Gimhae FC in 2012.

He was selected by Suwon FC in 2015 K League draft.
