= Yo-han =

- Hangul: 요한
- RR: Yohan
- MR: Yohan

Yo-han is a Korean given name. It is also the Korean equivalent of the Biblical name John. As such, it is sometimes used as a given name by Korean Christians, particularly Korean Catholics.

People with this name include:

- Chu Yo-han (1900–1979), South Korean poet
- John Cho (born Cho Yo-han, 1972), South Korean-born American actor
- Lee Yo-han (born 1985), South Korean football player
- Kim Yo-han (volleyball) (born 1985), South Korean volleyball player
- Byun Yo-han (born 1986), South Korean actor
- Go Yo-han (born 1988), South Korean football right back
- Park Yo-han (born 1989), South Korean football full back
- Yohan Hwang (born 1995), South Korean singer in the Philippines
- Kim Yo-han (singer) (born 1999), South Korean singer and actor, member of boy band WEi

Fictional characters with this name include:

- Kim Yo-han, in 2009 South Korean film White Night
- Kim Yo-han, in 2011 South Korean television series White Christmas
- Cha Yo-han, in 2019 South Korean television series Doctor John
- Kang Yo-han, in 2021 South Korean television series The Devil Judge

== See also ==
- List of Korean given names
