= Park Sang-in =

South Korean footballer and manager

Personal information
- Date of birth: 15 November 1952 (age 73)
- Place of birth: Changnyeong, Gyeongnam, South Korea
- Height: 1.75 m (5 ft 9 in)
- Position: Midfielder

Team information
- Current team: Busan Transportation Corporation

Youth career
- 1969–1971: Dongnae High School

Senior career*
Years	Team	Apps	(Gls)
1972–1980	Commercial Bank of Korea		
1973–1975	→ ROK Army (military service)		
1981–1982	MSV Duisburg	2	(0)
1982–1985	Hallelujah FC	65	(17)
1986–1987	Hyundai Horang-i	13	(3)

International career
1975–1980	South Korea	70	(16)

Managerial career
- 1988–2001: Dongnae High School
- 1992–1993: South Korea U20
- 2006–: Busan Transportation Corporation
- 2009: South Korea B
Medal record
Representing South Korea
Men's football
Asian Games
Gold medal – first place	1978 Bangkok	Team
- * Club domestic league appearances and goals

- Park Sang-in
- Hangul: 박상인
- Hanja: 朴商寅
- RR: Bak Sangin
- MR: Pak Sangin

Park Sang-in (Korean: 박상인, born 15 November 1952) is a South Korean football manager and former player who manages Korea National League club Busan Transportation Corporation. His sons Park Hyuk-soon and Park Seung-min are also footballers.

== Playing career ==
Park began his career at Changnyeong Middle School at the age of 13. He went through Dongnae High School, graduating in 1972. In the same year he joined the Commercial Bank of Korea. One year later, he joined the army in order to fulfil his military service.

In 1981, he had trials for Dutch club, Feyenoord, receiving a favorable response from the club. However, the contract foundered due to an objection of the player's labor union. In July 1981, he signed a contract with Bundesliga club MSV Duisburg for one year. He played only two league games though, due to a thigh injury.

He returned to South Korea and joined Hallelujah FC. He lifted the first championship of the K League with Hallelujah FC in 1983. He then went on to play for Hyundai Horang-i from 1986 to 1987.

== Managerial career ==
After retiring from club football, he was appointed as his alma mater's football team manager from 1988 to 2001. In the middle of the term, in 1992–1993, he managed the South Korea U20 team, going to the 1993 FIFA World Youth Championship. The South Korean youth team finished unbeaten, with three draws. From 2006, he has managed newly formed Busan Transportation Corporation. In 2009, he went to the 2009 East Asian Games as the South Korea team manager.

== Honours ==
=== Player ===
ROK Army

- Korea Football League: 1974 Autumn; runner-up 1973 Autumn, 1975 Spring
- Korean President's Cup: 1975
- Korean National Football Championship: 1975

Hallelujah FC

- K League: 1983

South Korea

- Asian Games: 1978
- Korea Cup: 1976, 1978
- King's Cup: 1975
- Merdeka Tournament: 1977

Individual

- Korean National Football Championship MVP: 1975
- K-League Best XI: 1985

=== Manager ===
Busan Transportation Corporation

- National League Cup: 2010
