= Freestyle skiing at the 2015 Winter Universiade – Men's ski cross =

The men's ski cross competition of the 2015 Winter Universiade was held at Sulayr Snowpark, Sierra Nevada, Spain seeding was held on February 13.

But it will be hold the elimination round at February 14, it informed was competition was cancelle3d.
So the results of seeding is the final results.

== Results ==
=== Seeding ===
| Rank | Bib | Name | Country | Time | Difference | Notes |
|---|---|---|---|---|---|---|
| 1st place, gold medalist(s) | 32 | Bernhard Graf | Austria | 47.49 | | |
| 2nd place, silver medalist(s) | 1 | Timothe Henzi | Switzerland | 48.02 | +0.53 | |
| 3rd place, bronze medalist(s) | 10 | Igor Omelin | Russia | 48.04 | +0.55 | |
| 4 | 8 | Morgan Guipponi Barfety | France | 48.08 | +0.59 | |
| 5 | 2 | Tom Bonnefond | France | 48.09 | +0.6 | |
| 6 | 14 | Benoit Hoen | France | 48.2 | +0.71 | |
| 7 | 3 | Timo Müller | Switzerland | 48.23 | +0.74 | |
| 8 | 5 | Mateusz Habrat | Poland | 48.25 | +0.76 | |
| 9 | 18 | Maximilian Linninger | Austria | 48.56 | +1.07 | |
| 10 | 16 | Park Hyun | South Korea | 48.85 | +1.36 | |
| 11 | 17 | Christoph Stolz | Austria | 48.97 | +1.48 | |
| 12 | 26 | Tanguy Amigues | France | 48.98 | +1.49 | |
| 13 | 23 | Siarhei Mazaleuski | Belarus | 49.03 | +1.54 | |
| 14 | 12 | Mikhail Pudovkin | Russia | 49.06 | +1.57 | |
| 15 | 7 | Ishizuka Takahiro | Japan | 49.29 | +1.8 | |
| 16 | 11 | Artem Nabiulin | Russia | 49.34 | +1.85 | |
| 17 | 9 | Romain Detraz | Switzerland | 49.47 | +1.98 | |
| 18 | 19 | Theo Cheli | Switzerland | 49.48 | +1.99 | |
| 19 | 24 | Nicola Giorgi | Italy | 50.11 | +2.62 | |
| 20 | 28 | Davit Tediashvili | Georgia | 50.21 | +2.72 | |
| 21 | 4 | Jiři Čech | Czech Republic | 50.28 | +2.79 | |
| 22 | 15 | Han Sang-hyun | South Korea | 50.79 | +3.3 | |
| 23 | 21 | Morgan Haymans | United States | 50.87 | +3.38 | |
| 24 | 25 | Patrick Vandevelde | Belgium | 52.02 | +4.53 | |
| 25 | 27 | Andrea Conci | Italy | 52.1 | +4.61 | |
| 26 | 30 | Broby Leeds | United States | 1:01.11 | +13.62 | |
| 27 | 29 | John Leonard | United States | 1:02.35 | +14.86 | |
| | 6 | Artem Smirkov | Russia | | | DNS |
| | 13 | Lukas Peherstorfer | Austria | | | DNS |
| | 22 | Alexandre Nakonetchnyi | Russia | | | DNS |
| | 33 | Cody Potter | United States | | | DSQ |
