= Park Hyuk-soon =

South Korean footballer (born 1980)

Personal information
- Date of birth: March 6, 1980 (age 46)
- Place of birth: South Korea
- Height: 1.78 m (5 ft 10 in)
- Position: Midfielder

Youth career
- 1996–1998: Dongnae High School
- 1999–2002: Yonsei University

Senior career*
Years	Team	Apps	(Gls)
2003	Anyang LG Cheetahs	7	(0)
2004–2006	Incheon United	0	(0)
2005–2006	→ Gwangju Sangmu (military service)	7	(0)
2007–2008	Gyeongnam FC	3	(1)
2009–2014	Busan Transportation Corporation	21	(0)

Managerial career
- 2015–2018: FC Seoul Youth Team (assistant)
- 2019–2020: FC Seoul (assistant)
- 2020: FC Seoul (caretaker)
Medal record
Representing South Korea
East Asian Games
Bronze medal – third place	2009 Hong Kong	Team
- * Club domestic league appearances and goals

- Park Hyuk-soon
- Hangul: 박혁순
- Hanja: 朴赫淳
- RR: Bak Hyeoksun
- MR: Pak Hyŏksun

Park Hyuk-soon (born March 6, 1980) is a South Korean football player who since 2009 has played for Busan Transportation Corporation. His father Park Sang-in and his brother Park Seung-min are also footballers.

== Club career ==
He played in K League for the Anyang LG Cheetahs, Incheon United, Gwangju Sangmu and Gyeongnam FC from 2003 through 2008.
