= Kim Jung-min =

- Hangul: 김정민
- RR: Gim Jeongmin
- MR: Kim Chŏngmin

Kim Jung-min (Korean: 김정민) is a Korean name consisting of the family name Kim and the given name Jung-min, and may also refer to:

- Kim Jung-min (entertainer) (born 1968), South Korean actor and singer
- Kim Jung-min (born 1985), stage name Shin So-yul, South Korean actress
- Kim Jung-min (actress) (born 1989), South Korean actress
- Kim Jung-min (basketball) (born 1972), South Korean basketball player
- Kim Jeong-min (curler) (born 1992), South Korean curler
- Kim Jung-min (footballer) (born 1999), South Korean football midfielder
- Kim Jong-min (North Korean footballer)
