= Park Seung-min =

South Korean footballer

Personal information
- Date of birth: April 21, 1983 (age 43)
- Place of birth: South Korea
- Height: 1.82 m (6 ft 0 in)
- Position: Midfielder

Team information
- Current team: Busan Transportation Corporation
- Number: 8

Youth career
- 1998–2000: Dongnae High School
- 2001–2004: Kyung Hee University

Senior career*
Years	Team	Apps	(Gls)
2005–2010	Incheon United	20	(0)
2009–2010	→ Gwangju Sangmu (army)	12	(0)
2011–	Busan Transportation Corporation	25	(10)
- * Club domestic league appearances and goals as of 1 November 2010

- Park Seung-min
- Hangul: 박승민
- Hanja: 朴昇敏
- RR: Bak Seungmin
- MR: Pak Sŭngmin

Park Seung-min (born April 21, 1983) is a South Korean football player who plays for South Korean second division side Busan Transportation Corporation. His father Park Sang-in and his brother Park Hyuk-soon are also footballers.

During five seasons he has played for Incheon United (including military duty).

He scored 1 goal at Hauzen Cup 2006.
