= Kim Min-june (footballer, born January 1994) =

South Korean footballer (born 1994)

Personal information
- Date of birth: 27 January 1994 (age 32)
- Height: 1.77 m (5 ft 10 in)
- Position: Forward

Team information
- Current team: Gimhae
- Number: 9

Youth career
- Gwangyang Jecheol High School
- 2013–2016: Hannam University

Senior career*
Years	Team	Apps	(Gls)
2017–2018	Gangwon	7	(0)
2018	→ Busan Transportation (loan)	27	(8)
2019	Gyeongju HNP	11	(0)
2020–	Gimhae	17	(4)
- * Club domestic league appearances and goals as of 14:18, 29 June 2021 (UTC)

- Kim Min-june
- Hangul: 김민준
- Hanja: 金敏俊
- RR: Gim Minjun
- MR: Kim Minjun

Kim Min-june (Korean: 김민준; born 27 January 1994) is a South Korean footballer currently playing as a defender for Gimhae FC.

== Career statistics ==
=== Club ===
As of 29 June 2021.

Club	Season	League			Cup		Other		Total	
Club	Season	Division	Apps	Goals	Apps	Goals	Apps	Goals	Apps	Goals
Hannam University	2014	–			1	1	0	0	1	1
Gangwon	2017	K League Classic	7	0	0	0	0	0	7	0
Gangwon	2018	K League 1	0	0	0	0	0	0	0	0
Gangwon	Total		7	0	0	0	0	0	7	0
Busan Transportation Corporation (loan)	2018	Korea National League	27	8	2	0	3 (Note: Appearances in the Korea National League Championship)	1	32	9
Gyeongju HNP	2019	Korea National League	11	0	4	0	1	0	16	0
Gimhae	2020	K3 League	17	4	2	0	0	0	19	4
Gimhae	2021	K3 League	0	0	0	0	0	0	0	0
Gimhae	Total		17	4	2	0	0	0	19	5
Career total			62	12	9	1	0	0	71	13
