= Jung-min =

- Hangul: 정민
- RR: Jeongmin
- MR: Chŏngmin

Jung-min, also spelled Jeong-min or Chung-min, is a Korean given name.

People with this name include:

== Entertainers ==
- Seo Jeong-min (born 1934), South Korean cinematographer
- Kim Jung-min (entertainer) (born Kim Jung-soo, 1968), South Korean actor and singer
- Hwang Jung-min (born 1970), South Korean actor
- Bae Jeong-min (born 1974), South Korean voice actress
- Heo Jung-min (born 1982), South Korean actor
- Shin So-yul (born Kim Jung-min, 1985), South Korean actress
- Park Jeong-min (actor) (born 1987), South Korean actor
- Park Jung-min (singer) (born 1987), South Korean singer, member of boy band SS501
- Seo Eun-soo (born Lee Jeong-min, 1994), South Korean actress

== Sportspeople ==
- Choi Chung-min (1930–1983), South Korean football striker
- Yang Jung-min (born 1986), South Korean football defender (Chinese Super League)
- Park Jeong-min (footballer) (born 1988), South Korean football forward (Korea National League)
- Lee Jeong-min (born 1990), South Korean football defender (Philippines Football League)
- Kim Jung-min (footballer) (born 1999), South Korean football midfielder (Austrian First League)

== See also ==
- List of Korean given names
