= Lee Do-seong =

South Korean footballer (born 1984)

Personal information
- Full name: Lee Do-seong
- Date of birth: March 22, 1984 (age 42)
- Place of birth: South Korea
- Height: 1.73 m (5 ft 8 in)
- Position: Midfielder

Senior career*
Years	Team	Apps	(Gls)
2007–2008	Daejeon Citizen	1	(0)
2009–2016	Goyang Zaicro	218	(6)
2017	Seoul E-Land	0	(0)
- * Club domestic league appearances and goals as of 1 January 2018

Lee Do-seong (born March 22, 1984) is a South Korean football player.

Lee previously played for Daejeon Citizen, Goyang Zaicro, and Seoul E-Land in the K League.
