= Park Gi-dong =

South Korean footballer

Park Gi-Dong 박기동
Personal information
- Full name: Park Gi-Dong
- Date of birth: 1 November 1988 (age 38)
- Place of birth: Daejeon, South Korea
- Height: 1.91 m (6 ft 3 in)
- Position: Forward

Team information
- Current team: Gimhae City FC
- Number: 22

Youth career
- Soongsil University

Senior career*
| Years | Team | Apps | (Gls) |
| 2010 | FC Gifu | 8 | (1) |
| 2011–2012 | Gwangju FC | 58 | (8) |
| 2013 | Jeju United | 6 | (0) |
| 2013–2016 | Jeonnam Dragons | 30 | (1) |
| 2015–2016 | → Sangju Sangmu (army) | 60 | (15) |
| 2017–2018 | Suwon Samsung Bluewings | 33 | (4) |
| 2019 | Gyeongnam FC | 7 | (1) |
| 2019 | → Daegu FC (loan) | 12 | (1) |
| 2020 | Gyeongnam FC | 22 | (4) |
| 2021 | Daegu FC | 2 | (0) |
| 2022 - | Gimhae City FC | 25 | (1) |

International career^{‡}
| 2011– | South Korea | 1 | (0) |
- * Club domestic league appearances and goals as of 22 October 2022 ‡ National team caps and goals as of 10 April 2011

- Park Gi-dong
- Hangul: 박기동
- Hanja: 朴基棟
- RR: Bak Gidong
- MR: Pak Kidong

Park Gi-Dong (Korean: 박기동; Hanja: 朴基棟; born 1 November 1988) is a South Korean professional football forward, who plays for Gimhae City FC.

== Career ==
Park began his professional football career with Japanese club FC Gifu in 2010. In his one-year Park appeared in 8 matches and scored 1 goal.

Park was drafted a fledgling team Gwangju FC in the 2011 K-League Draft. He has been made captain for the 2011 season.

== Club statistics ==
| Club performance | | | League | | Cup | | League Cup | | Continental | | Total | |
| Season | Club | League | Apps | Goals | Apps | Goals | Apps | Goals | Apps | Goals | Apps | Goals |
| Japan | | | League | | Emperor's Cup | | League Cup | | Asia | | Total | |
|---|---|---|---|---|---|---|---|---|---|---|---|---|
| 2010 | FC Gifu | J2 League | 8 | 1 | 0 | 0 | - | | - | | 8 | 1 |
| South Korea | | | League | | KFA Cup | | League Cup | | Asia | | Total | |
| 2011 | Gwangju FC | K League 1 | 27 | 3 | 1 | 0 | 4 | 0 | - | | 32 | 3 |
| 2012 | Gwangju FC | K League 1 | 31 | 5 | 1 | 0 | - | | - | | 32 | 5 |
| 2013 | Jeju United | K League 1 | 6 | 0 | 1 | 0 | - | | - | | 7 | 0 |
| 2013 | Jeonnam Dragons | K League 1 | 18 | 1 | 0 | 0 | - | | - | | 18 | 1 |
| 2014 | Jeonnam Dragons | K League 1 | 7 | 0 | 0 | 0 | - | | - | | 7 | 0 |
| 2015 | Sangju Sangmu | K League 2 | 35 | 6 | - | | - | | - | | 35 | 6 |
| 2016 | Sangju Sangmu | K League 1 | 10 | 6 | - | | - | | - | | 10 | 6 |
| Total | Japan | | 8 | 1 | 0 | 0 | - | | - | | 8 | 1 |
| Total | South Korea | | 134 | 21 | 3 | 0 | 4 | 0 | - | | 141 | 21 |
| Career total | | | 142 | 22 | 3 | 0 | 4 | 0 | - | | 149 | 22 |

Sporting positions
| Preceded by Inaugural | Gwangju FC captain 2011 | Succeeded by Kim Eun-sun |
