= Lee Yong-seung =

South Korean footballer

Lee Yong-Seung
Personal information
- Full name: Lee Yong-Seung
- Date of birth: 28 September 1984 (age 42)
- Place of birth: Sacheon, South Korea
- Height: 1.75 m (5 ft 9 in)
- Position: Forward

Team information
- Current team: Busan TC
- Number: 32

Youth career
- Youngnam University

Senior career*
Years	Team	Apps	(Gls)
2007–2008	Gyeongnam FC	29	(1)
2009–2012	Busan TC	47	(30)
2011–2012	→ Police (military service)		
2013	Chunnam Dragons	3	(0)
2013–	Busan TC		
- * Club domestic league appearances and goals as of 2 July 2013

Lee Yong-Seung (Korean: 이용승; born 28 September 1984) is a South Korean footballer who plays as a forward for Busan TC.
