= Jin Chang-soo =

South Korean footballer (born 1985)

Personal information
- Full name: Jin Chang-soo
- Date of birth: 26 October 1985 (age 41)
- Place of birth: Japan
- Height: 1.75 m (5 ft 9 in)
- Position: Midfielder

Team information
- Current team: Ansan Greeners
- Number: 11

Senior career*
| Years | Team | Apps | (Gls) |
| 2006 | Sagawa Express Osaka | | |
| 2007 | Sagawa Express | | |
| 2008 | FC Korea | | |
| 2009 | Pocheon FC | | |
| 2010–2012 | Gangneung City | 67 | (15) |
| 2013 | Goyang Hi FC | 33 | (5) |
| 2014 | Gyeongju KHNP | 15 | (3) |
| 2015 | Goyang Hi FC | 39 | (7) |
| 2016–2018 | Bucheon | 103 | (23) |
| 2019– | Ansan Greeners | 8 | (1) |
- * Club domestic league appearances and goals as of 15 November 2019

Jin Chang-soo (Korean: 진창수; born 26 October 1985) is a South Korean footballer who plays as midfielder for Ansan Greeners in K League 2.

== Career ==
Jin participated in Korean National Sports Festival in 2008 on one of the members representing ethnic Koreans living in Japan and signed with Pocheon FC after the competition. In 2010, Korea National League side Gangneung FC signed him.

He moved to Goyang Hi FC in 2013.

In January 2015, Jin returned to Goyang after playing one season for Gyeongju KHNP.
