= Yeo Reum =

South Korean footballer (born 1989)

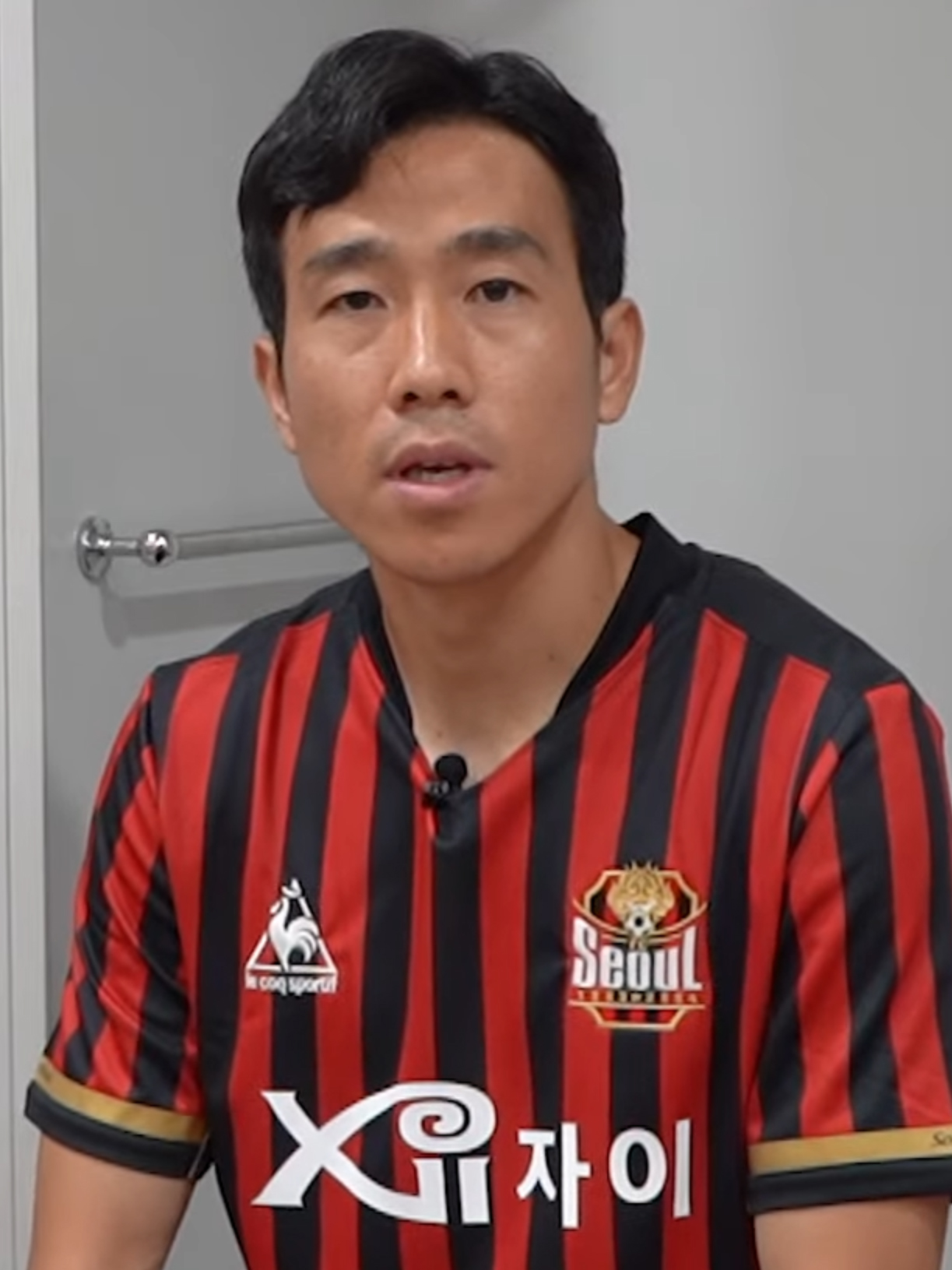
- Yeo in July 2021

Personal information
- Full name: Yeo Reum
- Date of birth: 22 June 1989 (age 37)
- Place of birth: South Korea
- Height: 1.75 m (5 ft 9 in)
- Position: Central midfielder

Team information
- Current team: Busan IPark
- Number: 81

Youth career
- 2008–2011: Gwangju University

Senior career*
Years	Team	Apps	(Gls)
2012–2020	Gwangju FC	180	(9)
2017–2018	→ Sangju Sangmu (army)	37	(1)
2021	Jeju United	10	(0)
2021	FC Seoul	13	(0)
2022–2023	Incheon United	16	(0)
2023–	Busan IPark	14	(0)
- * Club domestic league appearances and goals as of 14 December 2023

Yeo Reum (Korean: 여름; born 22 June 1989) is a South Korean footballer who plays as midfielder for Busan IPark of K League 2.

== Club career ==
He was selected by Gwangju FC in the 2012 K-League draft, but didn't see the field in his first drafted year. He made his debut in the league match against Sangju Sangmu on 16 March 2013.
