= Lee Han-saem =

South Korean footballer

Lee Han-Saem
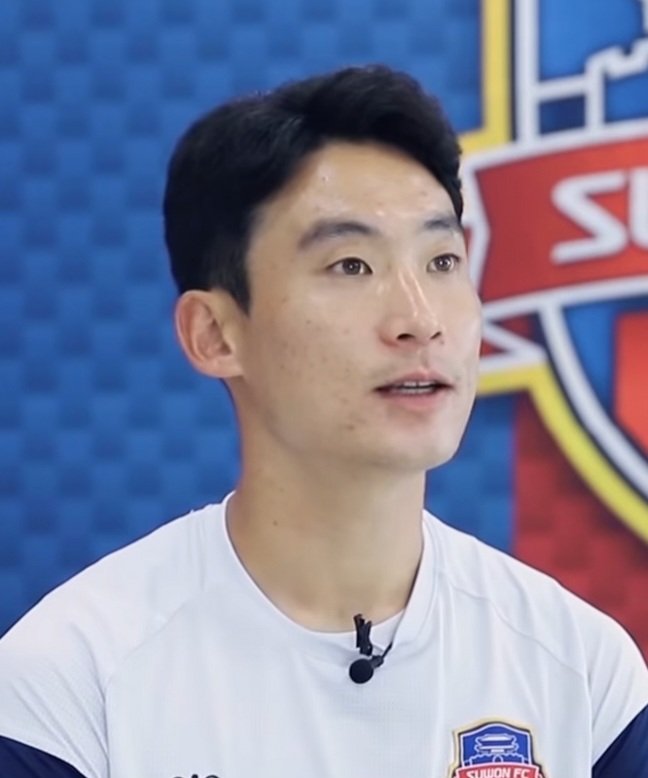

Personal information
- Full name: Lee Han-Saem
- Date of birth: 18 October 1989 (age 37)
- Place of birth: South Korea
- Height: 1.87 m (6 ft 2 in)
- Position: Centre back

Team information
- Current team: Gwangju FC
- Number: 26

Youth career
- Konkuk University

Senior career*
Years	Team	Apps	(Gls)
2012–2013	Gwangju FC	29	(2)
2013–2014	Gyeongnam FC	28	(0)
2015–2016	Gangwon FC	70	(3)
2017	Suwon FC	16	(0)
2018–2019	→ Asan Mugunghwa (army)	37	(4)
2019-2020	Suwon FC	26	(0)
2021-	Gwangju FC	3	(0)
Total		209	(9)
- * Club domestic league appearances and goals as of 14 October 2022

Lee Han-Saem (Korean: 이한샘; born 18 October 1989) is a South Korean footballer who plays as a centre back for Gwangju FC in the K League 2.
