= Lee Jung-rae =

South Korean footballer

Lee Jung-Rae
Personal information
- Date of birth: 12 November 1979 (age 46)
- Place of birth: South Korea
- Height: 1.86 m (6 ft 1 in)
- Position: Goalkeeper

Youth career
- 1998–2001: Konkuk University

Senior career*
Years	Team	Apps	(Gls)
2002–2005	Chunnam Dragons	1	(0)
2006–2011	Gyeongnam FC	51	(0)
2008–2009	→ Gwangju Sangmu (Army)	1	(0)
2012	Gwangju FC	2	(0)
2014–2015	Chungju Hummel	7	(0)
- * Club domestic league appearances and goals as of 24 December 2015

Lee Jung-Rae (Korean: 이정래; born 21 November 1979) is a South Korean football goalkeeper, who played for Chungju Hummel in K League Challenge.

== Club career ==
His previous clubs were Chunnam Dragons, Gyeongnam FC, Gwangju Sangmu and Gwangju FC.
