= Sung Kyung-mo =

South Korean footballer (born 1980)

Sung Kyung-Mo
Personal information
- Full name: Sung Kyung-Mo
- Date of birth: 26 June 1980 (age 46)
- Place of birth: South Korea
- Height: 1.83 m (6 ft 0 in)
- Position: Goalkeeper

Senior career*
Years	Team	Apps	(Gls)
2003–2004	Jeonbuk Hyundai Motors	0	(0)
2005–2010	Incheon United	52	(0)
2011	Gwangju FC	0	(0)
- * Club domestic league appearances and goals as of 17 June 2011

- Sung Kyung-mo
- Hangul: 성경모
- Hanja: 成京模
- RR: Seong Gyeongmo
- MR: Sŏng Kyŏngmo

Sung Kyung-Mo (born 26 June 1980) is a South Korean football player who played for Jeonbuk Hyundai Motors, Incheon United and Gwangju FC.

He was released for accepting bribes as part of a probe into match-fixing in the league on 19 May 2011. On 17 June 2011, his football career was rescinded by the Korea Professional Football League with other accomplices.
