= Kim Ho-nam =

South Korean footballer

Personal information
- Date of birth: June 14, 1989 (age 37)
- Place of birth: Jeonju, North Jeolla, South Korea
- Height: 1.78 m (5 ft 10 in)
- Position: Forward

Team information
- Current team: Incheon United
- Number: 11

Youth career
- 2005–2007: Jeonju Technical High School
- 2008–2009: University of Gwangju

Senior career*
| Years | Team | Apps | (Gls) |
| 2010 | Sagan Tosu | 4 | (0) |
| 2011–2015 | Gwangju FC | 90 | (21) |
| 2016–2019 | Jeju United | 60 | (8) |
| 2017–2018 | → Sangju Sangmu (army) | 53 | (9) |
| 2019–2021 | Incheon United | 32 | (6) |
| 2021 | Suwon | 5 | (0) |
| 2021 | Pohang Steelers | 1 | (0) |
| 2022– | Bucheon FC | 31 | (3) |
- * Club domestic league appearances and goals as of 1 January 2018

- Kim Ho-nam
- Hangul: 김호남
- Hanja: 金浩男
- RR: Gim Honam
- MR: Kim Honam

Kim Ho-nam (Korean: 김호남; born June 14, 1989) is a South Korean football player who plays for Bucheon FC.

== Club statistics ==
| Club performance | | | League | | Cup | | Total | |
| Season | Club | League | Apps | Goals | Apps | Goals | Apps | Goals |
| Japan | | | League | | Emperor's Cup | | Total | |
|---|---|---|---|---|---|---|---|---|
| 2010 | Sagan Tosu | J2 League | 4 | 0 | 1 | 0 | 5 | 0 |
| Country | Japan | | 4 | 0 | 1 | 0 | 5 | 0 |
| Total | | | 4 | 0 | 1 | 0 | 5 | 0 |

== Honours ==
Pohang Steelers

- AFC Champions League: 2021 (runners-up)
