= Lee Yong (footballer, born 1989) =

South Korean footballer

Personal information
- Full name: Lee Yong
- Date of birth: 21 January 1989 (age 37)
- Place of birth: South Korea
- Height: 1.87 m (6 ft 1 1/2 in)
- Position: Defender

Team information
- Current team: Suwon FC
- Number: 27

Youth career
- 2007–2011: Korea University

Senior career*
Years	Team	Apps	(Gls)
2011–2012	Gwangju FC	45	(1)
2013–2015	Jeju United	52	(3)
2015–2016	Al-Khor	15	(1)
2016	Seongnam FC	0	(0)
2017–2018	Gangwon FC	1	(0)
2017–2018	→ Asan Mugunghwa (army)	3	(0)
2019–	Suwon FC	7	(1)
- * Club domestic league appearances and goals as of 1 January 2018

- Lee Yong
- Hangul: 이용
- Hanja: 李龍
- RR: I Yong
- MR: I Yong

Lee Yong (Korean: 이용; Hanja: 李龍; born 21 January 1989) is a South Korean footballer who plays as defender for Suwon FC.

== Club career ==
Lee was selected in the priority pick of the 2011 K-League Draft by Gwangju FC.

He joined Qatar Stars League side Al-Khor in July 2015.
