= Lim Sun-young =

South Korean footballer (born 1988)

Lim Sun-Young
Personal information
- Full name: Lim Sun-Young
- Date of birth: 21 March 1988 (age 38)
- Place of birth: Hanam, South Korea
- Height: 1.85 m (6 ft 1 in)
- Position: Midfielder

Youth career
- 2007–2010: University of Suwon

Senior career*
| Years | Team | Apps | (Gls) |
| 2011–2017 | Gwangju FC | 116 | (16) |
| 2016–2017 | → Ansan Mugunghwa (army) | 20 | (4) |
| 2018–2019 | Jeonbuk Hyundai | 41 | (8) |
| 2020–2021 | Seongnam FC | 6 | (0) |
| 2021 | → FC Anyang (loan) | 3 | (0) |
- * Club domestic league appearances and goals as of 16 February 2022

- Lim Sun-young
- Hangul: 임선영
- Hanja: 林善永
- RR: Im Seonyeong
- MR: Im Sŏnyŏng

Lim Sun-Young (Korean: 임선영; Hanja: 林善永; born 21 March 1988) is a South Korean footballer who plays as a midfielder.

== Club career ==
Lim was selected in the priority pick of the 2011 K-League Draft by Gwangju FC.
