= Kim Dong-sub =

South Korean footballer

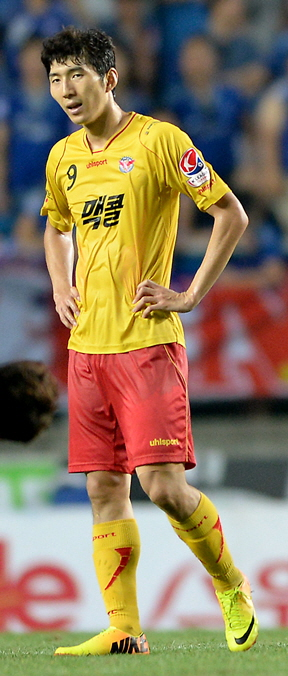

Personal information
- Full name: Kim Dong-sub
- Date of birth: 29 March 1989 (age 37)
- Place of birth: Icheon, Gyeonggi, South Korea
- Height: 1.87 m (6 ft 2 in)
- Position: Forward

Team information
- Current team: Gangneung City

Youth career
- 2005–2007: Janghoon High School

Senior career*
Years	Team	Apps	(Gls)
2007–2010	Shimizu S-Pulse	0	(0)
2009–2010	→ Tokushima Vortis (loan)	11	(0)
2011–2012	Gwangju FC	55	(14)
2013–2015	Seongnam FC	75	(18)
2015–2018	Busan IPark	15	(1)
2016–2017	→ Ansan / Asan Mugunghwa (army)	22	(4)
2019	Seoul E-Land	1	(0)
2020–	Gangneung City		

International career^{‡}
2007–2009	South Korea U20	19	(11)
2009–2012	South Korea U23	11	(3)
2013	South Korea	3	(0)
- * Club domestic league appearances and goals as of 18 December 2019 ‡ National team caps and goals as of 14 August 2013

- Kim Dong-sub
- Hangul: 김동섭
- Hanja: 金東燮
- RR: Gim Dongseop
- MR: Kim Tongsŏp

Kim Dong-sub (Korean: 김동섭; born 29 March 1989) is a South Korean football forward who plays for Gangneung City.

== Club career ==
Despite having represented his country at youth level, Kim never made a first team start for Shimizu S-Pulse in the J1 League due to injuries. On 7 August 2009 he transferred to Tokushima Vortis on loan.

Kim was selected first designate in the 2011 K League Draft by Gwangju FC.

In 2016, Busan IPark loaned Sub out to Ansan Mugunghwa for military duty.

== International career ==
He was a member of the South Korea national U-20 team at the 2009 FIFA U-20 World Cup.

== Club statistics ==
Club performance			League		Cup		League Cup		Total	
Season	Club	League	Apps	Goals	Apps	Goals	Apps	Goals	Apps	Goals
Japan			League		Emperor's Cup		League Cup		Total	
2007	Shimizu S-Pulse	J1 League	0	0	0	0	0	0	0	0
2008	Shimizu S-Pulse	J1 League	0	0	0	0	0	0	0	0
2009	Shimizu S-Pulse	J1 League	0	0	0	0	0	0	0	0
2009	Tokushima Vortis	J2 League	10	0	0	0	—		10	0
2010	Tokushima Vortis	J2 League	1	0	0	0	—		1	0
South Korea			League		KFA Cup		League Cup		Total	
2011	Gwangju FC	K League 1	23	7	1	0	4	0	28	7
2012	Gwangju FC	K League 1	32	7			—		32	7
2013	Seongnam FC	K League 1	36	14	1	1	—		37	15
2014	Seongnam FC	K League 1	34	4	4	1	—		38	5
2015	Seongnam FC	K League 1	5	0	0	0	—		5	0
2015	Busan IPark	K League 1	8	0	0	0	—		8	0
2016	Ansan Mugunghwa	K League 2	16	4	0	0	—		16	4
2017	Asan Mugunghwa	K League 2	6	0	1	0	—		7	0
2017	Busan IPark	K League 2	0	0	0	0	—		0	0
2018	Busan IPark	K League 2	7	1	1	0	—		8	1
2019	Seoul E-Land	K League 2	1	0	0	0	—		1	0
Career total			179	37	8	2	4	0	191	39
