= Gwangju World Cup Stadium =

Football stadium in South Korea

Coordinates: 35°08′01.2″N 126°52′29.5″E

- Guus Hiddink Stadium
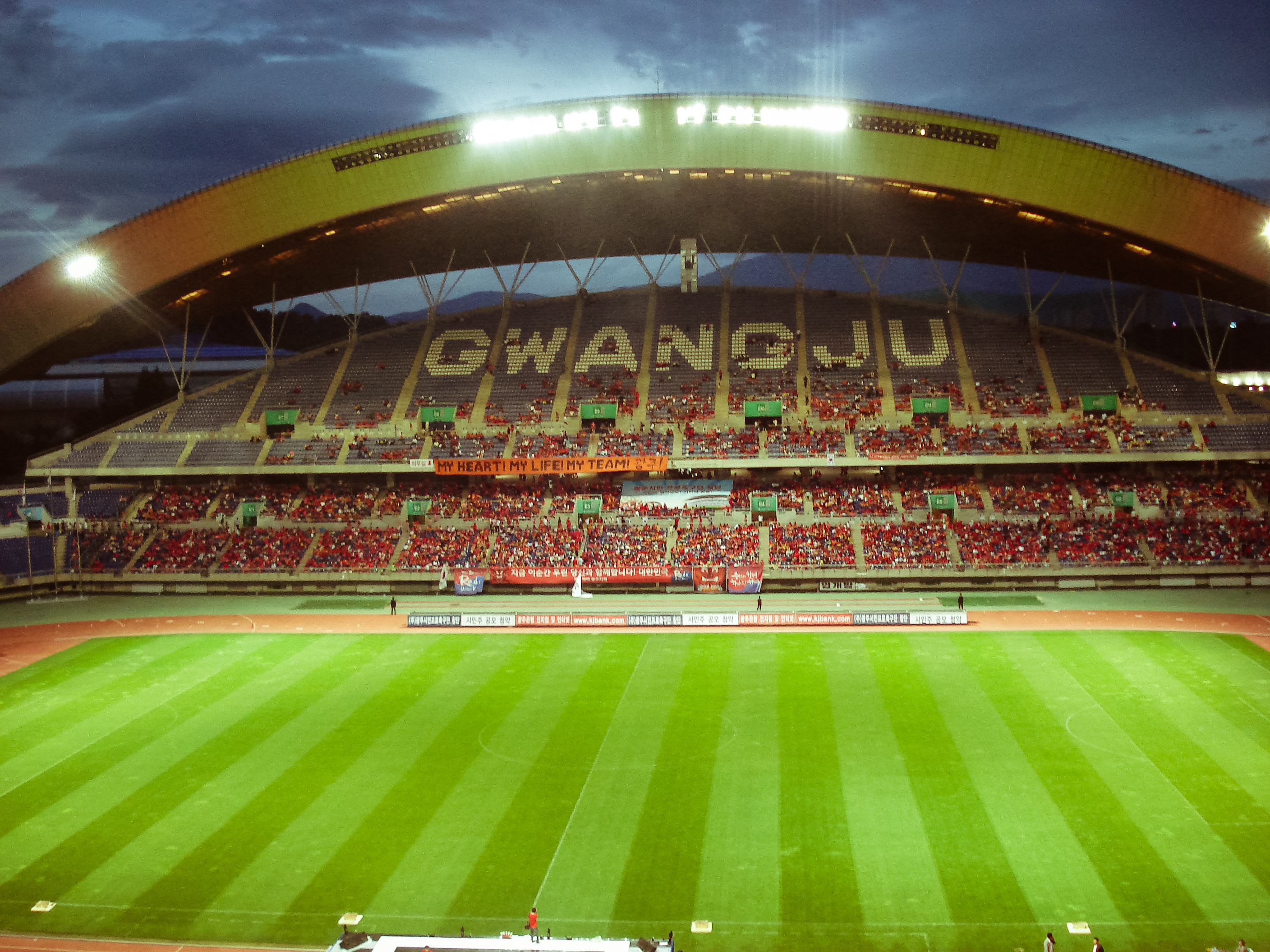
- Interactive map of Gwangju World Cup Stadium
- Location: Seo-gu, Gwangju, South Korea
- Owner: Gwangju Metropolitan City Hall
- Operator: Gwangju Metropolitan City Sports Association
- Capacity: 40,245

Construction
- Groundbreaking: November 1998
- Built: 1998–2001
- Opened: November 2001

Tenants
- Gwangju Sangmu (2003–2010); Gwangju FC (2011–2020, 2025–present)

The Gwangju World Cup Stadium (Korean: 광주월드컵경기장) is a multi-purpose stadium in Gwangju, South Korea. It is the home stadium of Gwangju FC of the K League and has a capacity of 40,245.

The stadium is managed by the Sports Support Division of the Culture & Sports Policy Office of the Gwangju Metropolitan City. Initially, the stadium was named Gwangju World Cup Stadium to host some matches of the 2002 FIFA World Cup. In honour of the former South Korea national football team manager Guus Hiddink, who helped the team reach the World Cup semi-finals for the first time, the stadium is also unofficially called the Guus Hiddink Stadium.

It was the venue of the 3rd Asia Song Festival, organised by Korea Foundation for International Culture Exchange in 2006. It was also the main venue of the 2015 Summer Universiade.

== 2002 FIFA World Cup matches ==
Date	Team 1	Result	Team 2	Round	Attendance
2 June 2002	Spain	3–1	Slovenia	Group B	28,598
4 June 2002	China	0–2	Costa Rica	Group C	27,217
21 June 2002	Spain	0–0 (a.e.t.) (3–5 pen.)	South Korea	Quarter-finals	42,114

Preceded by New Rubin Kazan Stadium; Kazan	Summer Universiade; Opening and Closing Ceremonies; 2015	Succeeded by Taipei Municipal Stadium; Taipei
