= An Dong-hyeok =

South Korean footballer

Personal information
- Full name: An Dong-hyeok
- Date of birth: 11 November 1988 (age 37)
- Place of birth: South Korea
- Height: 1.76 m (5 ft 9 in)
- Position: Midfielder

Youth career
- Kwangwoon University

Senior career*
Years	Team	Apps	(Gls)
2011–2013	Gwangju FC	68	(2)
2014	Cheonan City	24	(1)
2015–2017	FC Anyang	30	(0)
2018	Seoul E-Land	10	(1)
- * Club domestic league appearances and goals as of 1 January 2019

- An Dong-hyeok
- Hangul: 안동혁
- Hanja: 安東赫
- RR: An Donghyeok
- MR: An Tonghyŏk

An Dong-hyeok (Korean: 안동혁; Hanja: 安東赫; born 11 November 1988) is a South Korean footballer who plays as a midfielder.

== Club career ==
An was selected in the priority pick of the 2011 K-League Draft by Gwangju FC.
