= Jo Woo-jin (footballer, born 1987) =

South Korean footballer

Jo Woo-Jin
Personal information
- Full name: Jo Woo-Jin
- Date of birth: 7 July 1987 (age 39)
- Place of birth: Andong, South Korea
- Height: 1.77 m (5 ft 9 1/2 in)
- Position: Midfielder

Youth career
- Pohang Steelers U-18

Senior career*
| Years | Team | Apps | (Gls) |
| 2006–2007 | Sanfrecce Hiroshima | 0 | (0) |
| 2008 | Ulsan Mipo Dolphins | 4 | (0) |
| 2010 | Mokpo City | 21 | (2) |
| 2011–2012 | Gwangju FC | 17 | (1) |
| 2013 | Daegu FC | 3 | (0) |
| 2014 | Cheonan City FC | 11 | (0) |
| 2015–2016 | Hwaseong FC | 0 | (0) |
| 2017–2018 | Ansan Greeners FC | 25 | (0) |

International career
| 2006–2007 | South Korea U-20 | 2 | (0) |
| 2008–2009 | South Korea U-23 | | |
- * Club domestic league appearances and goals as of 6 January 2019

- Jo Woo-jin
- Hangul: 조우진
- Hanja: 趙佑鎭
- RR: Jo Ujin
- MR: Cho Ujin

Jo Woo-Jin (Korean: 조우진; born 7 July 1987) is a South Korean footballer who has played as a midfielder for several South Korean football clubs, including Gwangju FC and Daegu FC.

== Club career ==
Jo began his professional career in 2006 with Japanese club Sanfrecce Hiroshima, returning to Korea in 2008 after being released by his club following their relegation to the second tier of the J. League. Jo then plied his trade in the Korea National League, initially with Ulsan Hyundai Mipo Dockyard and then Mokpo City FC. Jo was a priority pick from the 2011 K-League draft for Gwangju FC's roster in their foundation season in the K-League and made his return to senior level professional football as a substitute in Gwangju's 0 – 1 League Cup loss to Busan I'Park on 6 April 2011.

== Club statistics ==
As of 6 March 2015

| Club performance | | | League | | Cup | | League Cup | | Total | |
| Season | Club | League | Apps | Goals | Apps | Goals | Apps | Goals | Apps | Goals |
| Japan | | | League | | Emperor's Cup | | J.League Cup | | Total | |
|---|---|---|---|---|---|---|---|---|---|---|
| 2006 | Sanfrecce Hiroshima | J1 League | 0 | 0 | 1 | 0 | 0 | 0 | 1 | 0 |
| 2007 | Sanfrecce Hiroshima | J1 League | 0 | 0 | 0 | 0 | 0 | 0 | 0 | 0 |
| South Korea | | | League | | KFA Cup | | League Cup | | Total | |
| 2008 | Ulsan Mipo Dolphins | Korea National League | 4 | 0 | 1 | 0 | - | | 5 | 0 |
| 2010 | Mokpo City | Korea National League | 21 | 2 | 1 | 0 | - | | 22 | 2 |
| 2011 | Gwangju FC | K-League | 8 | 0 | 0 | 0 | 3 | 0 | 11 | 0 |
| 2012 | Gwangju FC | K-League | 9 | 1 | 1 | 0 | - | | 10 | 1 |
| 2013 | Daegu FC | K-League Classic | 3 | 0 | 0 | 0 | - | | 3 | 0 |
| 2014 | Cheonan City FC | Korea National League | 11 | 0 | 0 | 0 | - | | 11 | 0 |
| Country | Japan | | 0 | 0 | 1 | 0 | 0 | 0 | 1 | 0 |
| Country | Korea Republic | | 56 | 3 | 3 | 0 | 3 | 0 | 62 | 3 |
| Career total | | | 56 | 3 | 4 | 0 | 3 | 0 | 63 | 3 |
