= Park Hee-sung =

South Korean footballer

Personal information
- Date of birth: 7 April 1987 (age 39)
- Place of birth: South Korea
- Height: 1.70 m (5 ft 7 in)
- Position: Midfielder

Team information
- Current team: Seongnam FC
- Number: 3

Youth career
- Honam University

Senior career*
Years	Team	Apps	(Gls)
2011–2013	Gwangju FC	67	(2)
2014–	Seongnam FC	22	(0)
- * Club domestic league appearances and goals as of 4 December 2014

- Park Hee-sung
- Hangul: 박희성
- Hanja: 朴熙成
- RR: Bak Huiseong
- MR: Pak Hŭisŏng

Park Hee-sung (Korean: 박희성; Hanja: 朴熙成; born 7 April 1987) is a South Korean footballer who plays as midfielder for Seongnam FC in the K-League.

== Club career ==
Park was selected in the priority pick of the 2011 K-League Draft by Gwangju FC.
