= Kim Soo-beom =

South Korean footballer (born 1990)

Kim Soo-Beom
Personal information
- Full name: Kim Soo-Beom
- Date of birth: 2 October 1990 (age 36)
- Place of birth: South Korea
- Height: 1.74 m (5 ft 8 1/2 in)
- Position: Defender

Team information
- Current team: Jeju United
- Number: 22

Youth career
- 2009–2010: Sangji University

Senior career*
Years	Team	Apps	(Gls)
2011–2013	Gwangju FC	89	(2)
2014–2019	Jeju United	70	(1)
2019–2020	Perth Glory	11	(0)
2020–2021	Gangwon	21	(1)
2021	Suwon	9	(0)
2022	Gimpo	11	(0)
2022–2023	Jeonnam Dragons	41	(0)
2024–	Jeju United	0	(0)
- * Club domestic league appearances and goals as of 7 October 2022

- Kim Soo-beom
- Hangul: 김수범
- Hanja: 金洙範
- RR: Gim Subeom
- MR: Kim Subŏm

Kim Soo-Beom (Korean: 김수범; Hanja: 金洙範; born 2 October 1990) is a South Korean footballer who plays as defender for Jeju United.

== Club career ==
=== Gwangju FC ===
Kim was selected in the priority pick of the 2011 K-League Draft by Gwangju FC.

=== Jeju United ===
Kim was picked up by Jeju United in 2014, playing mostly off the bench.

=== Perth Glory ===
On 30 July 2019, Kim transferred to Australian club Perth Glory, signing a one-year contract.

=== Gangwon FC ===
On 25 June 2020, it was announced that Kim left Perth Glory, and returned to South Korea, joining local club Gangwon FC.

== Career statistics ==
=== Club ===
As of 6 April 2024

Club performance			League		Cup		Continental		Other		Total	
Club	Season	Division	Apps	Goals	Apps	Goals	Apps	Goals	Apps	Goals	Apps	Goals
Gwangju FC	2011	K League 1	20	0	—		—		3 (Note: Korean League Cup)	0	23	0
Gwangju FC	2012	K League 1	38	0	—		—		—		38	0
Gwangju FC	2013	K League 2	31	2	1	0	—		—		32	2
Gwangju FC	Total		89	2	1	0	—		3	0	93	2
Jeju United	2014	K League 1	31	1	—		—		—		31	1
Jeju United	2015	K League 1	17	0	2	0	—		—		19	0
Jeju United	2016	K League 1	0	0	—		—		—		0	0
Jeju United	2017	K League 1	6	0	1	0	0	0	—		7	0
Jeju United	2018	K League 1	16	0	2	0	2 (Note: Appearance(s) in AFC Champions League)	0	—		20	0
Jeju United	Total		70	1	5	0	2	0	—		77	1
Perth Glory	2019-20	A-League	11	0	—		1	0	—		12	0
Gangwon	2020	K League 1	3	1	—		—		—		3	1
Gangwon	2021	K League 1	18	0	1	0	—		—		19	0
Gangwon	Total		21	1	1	0	—		—		22	1
Suwon	2021	K League 1	9	0	—		—		—		9	0
Gimpo	2022	K League 2	11	0	—		—		—		11	0
Jeonnam Dragons	2022	K League 2	16	0	—		—		—		16	0
Jeonnam Dragons	2023	K League 2	25	0	0	0	—		—		25	0
Jeonnam Dragons	Total		41	0	0	0	—		—		41	0
Career Total			252	4	7	0	3	0	3	0	265	4
