= Kim Min-jun (footballer, born March 1994) =

Korean association football player

Personal information
- Date of birth: 22 March 1994 (age 32)
- Place of birth: South Korea
- Height: 1.79 m (5 ft 10 in)
- Position: Defender

Team information
- Current team: Busan Transportation Corporation FC
- Number: 3

Youth career
- 2004–2006: Nagdong Elementary School
- 2007–2009: Jangpyung Middle School
- 2010–2012: Busan Information High School
- 2013–2015: University of Ulsan

Senior career*
Years	Team	Apps	(Gls)
2016	Busan IPark	10	(0)
2017	Gimhae	32	(3)
2018–2019	Jeonnam Dragons	23	(0)
2020-21	Gyeongju HNP	44	(2)
2022-	Busan Transportation Corporation FC	27	(3)
- * Club domestic league appearances and goals as of 17:35, 20 October 2022 (AEST)

- Kim Min-jun
- Hangul: 김민준
- RR: Gim Minjun
- MR: Kim Minjun

Kim Min-jun (Korean: 김민준; born 22 March 1994), formerly known as Kim Dae-ho, is a South Korean footballer currently playing as a defender for Busan Transportation Corporation FC.

== Career ==
Kim signed with Busan IPark on 23 December 2015 after impressing in an open try-out. He made his debut for the club in the first game of the 2016 K League Challenge season against Ansan.

== Career statistics ==
=== Club ===
As of 29 June 2021.

Club	Season	League			Cup		Other		Total	
Club	Season	Division	Apps	Goals	Apps	Goals	Apps	Goals	Apps	Goals
Busan IPark	2016	K League Challenge	10	0	2	0	0	0	12	0
Gimhae	2017	Korea National League	32	2	2	0	0	0	34	3
Jeonnam Dragons	2018	K League 1	7	0	3	1	0	0	10	1
Jeonnam Dragons	2019	K League 2	15	0	0	0	0	0	15	0
Jeonnam Dragons	Total		22	0	3	1	0	0	25	1
Gyeongju HNP	2020	K3 League	22	2	3	0	0	0	25	2
Gyeongju HNP	2021	K3 League	12	0	1	0	0	0	13	0
Gyeongju HNP	Total		34	2	4	0	0	0	38	2
Career total			98	4	11	1	0	0	109	5
