= Yoo Jong-hyun =

South Korean footballer

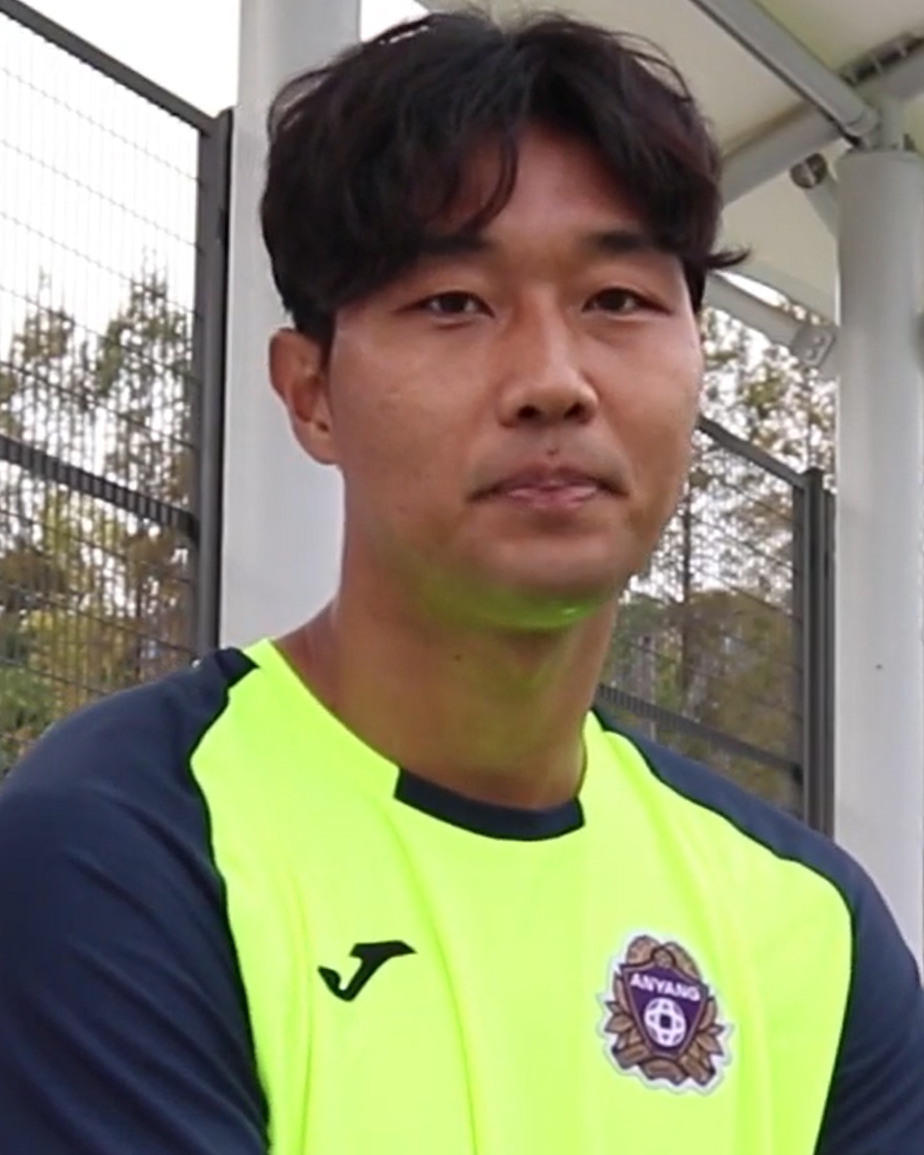
- Yoo with FC Anyang in 2019

Personal information
- Date of birth: 14 March 1988 (age 38)
- Place of birth: South Korea
- Height: 1.95 m (6 ft 5 in)
- Position: Defender

Team information
- Current team: FC Anyang
- Number: 5

Youth career
- 2004–2006: Anyang Technical High School
- 2007–2010: Konkuk University

Senior career*
Years	Team	Apps	(Gls)
2011–2013	Gwangju FC	64	(2)
2014	Chungju Hummel	30	(2)
2015–	FC Anyang	78	(1)
2017–2018	→ Gimpo Citizen (loan)		
- * Club domestic league appearances and goals as of 5 October 2022

- Yoo Jong-hyun
- Hangul: 유종현
- Hanja: 劉宗賢
- RR: Yu Jonghyeon
- MR: Yu Chonghyŏn

Yoo Jong-hyun (Korean: 유종현; Hanja: 劉宗賢; born 14 March 1988) is a South Korean footballer who plays as defender for FC Anyang in the K League 2.

== Club career ==
Yoo was selected in the priority pick of the 2011 K-League Draft by Gwangju FC.
