= Lim Ha-ram =

South Korean footballer

Personal information
- Full name: Lim Ha-ram
- Date of birth: 18 November 1990 (age 35)
- Place of birth: South Korea
- Height: 1.86 m (6 ft 1 in)
- Position: Centre-back

Team information
- Current team: Suwon FC
- Number: 4

Youth career
- Yonsei University

Senior career*
Years	Team	Apps	(Gls)
2011–2013	Gwangju FC	51	(0)
2014–2015	Incheon United	12	(0)
2015	→ Suwon FC (loan)	29	(0)
2016–	Suwon FC	31	(0)
- * Club domestic league appearances and goals as of 12 January 2018

- Lim Ha-ram
- Hangul: 임하람
- RR: Im Haram
- MR: Im Haram

Lim Ha-ram (Korean: 임하람; born 18 November 1990) is a South Korean footballer who plays as a centre-back for Suwon FC in South Korea's top-tier football league, the K League Classic. He has previously played for Gwangju FC and Incheon United.

== Club career ==
Lim was a priority pick from the 2011 K-League draft for Gwangju FC's roster in their foundation season in the K-League. Lim made his professional debut in a 0–1 League Cup loss to Busan I'Park on 6 April 2011, earning a yellow card late in the match.

== Club career statistics ==
As of 27 November 2015

Club performance			League		Cup		League Cup		Total	
Season	Club	League	Apps	Goals	Apps	Goals	Apps	Goals	Apps	Goals
South Korea			League		KFA Cup		League Cup		Total	
2011	Gwangju FC	K-League	11	0	1	0	3	0	15	0
2012	Gwangju FC	K-League	12	0	1	0	-		13	0
2013	Gwangju FC	K-League Classic	28	0	1	0	-		27	0
2014	Incheon United	K-League Classic	12	0	0	0	-		12	0
2015	Suwon FC	K League Challenge	29	0	0	0	-		29	0
Career total			92	0	3	0	3	0	98	0
