= Noh Haeng-seok =

South Korean footballer (1988–2025)

Noh Haeng-Seok
Personal information
- Date of birth: 17 November 1988
- Place of birth: South Korea
- Date of death: 1 January 2025 (aged 36)
- Height: 1.84 m (6 ft 0 in)
- Position: Defender

Youth career
- Dongguk University

Senior career*
Years	Team	Apps	(Gls)
2011–2012	Gwangju FC	11	(1)
2013–2014	Daegu FC	31	(3)
2015–2019	Busan IPark	27	(2)
2016–2018	→ Hwaseong FC (loan)		
2019	→ Kuala Lumpur FA (loan)	6	(0)
2020–2021	Gyeongju Korea Hydro & Nuclear Power FC	19	(1)
- * Club domestic league appearances and goals

Noh Haeng-Seok (Korean: 노행석; 17 November 1988 – 1 January 2025) was a South Korean footballer who played as a defender for Gwangju FC, Daegu FC, Busan IPark and Gyeongju Korea Hydro & Nuclear Power FC, also having loan spells at Hwaseong FC and Kuala Lumpur FA during his time at Busan IPark.

== Biography ==
Noh joined Gwangju in 2011. He joined Busan IPark at the start of the 2015 season.

Noh died on 1 January 2025, at the age of 36.

== Career statistics ==
Appearances and goals by club, season and competition
Club	Season	League			Korean FA Cup		Other		Total	
Club	Season	Division	Apps	Goals	Apps	Goals	Apps	Goals	Apps	Goals
Gwangju FC	2011	K-League	0	0	1	0	0	0	1	0
Gwangju FC	2012	K-League	11	1	0	0	0	0	11	1
Daegu FC	2013	K-League 1	0	0	0	0	–		0	0
Daegu FC	2014	K League 2	31	3	0	0	–		31	3
Busan I'Park	2015	K-League 1	23	1	1	1	–		24	2
Busan I'Park	2018	K League 2	3	1	0	0	2	0	5	1
Career total			68	6	2	1	2	0	72	7
