= Yoo Dong-min =

South Korean footballer

Yoo Dong-Min
Personal information
- Full name: Yoo Dong-Min
- Date of birth: 27 March 1989 (age 37)
- Place of birth: South Korea
- Height: 1.91 m (6 ft 3 in)
- Position: Forward

Team information
- Current team: Gyeongju KHNP
- Number: 9

Youth career
- 2008–2010: Chodang University

Senior career*
Years	Team	Apps	(Gls)
2011–2012	Gwangju FC	18	(1)
2013–	Gyeongju KHNP	7	(0)
- * Club domestic league appearances and goals as of 7 July 2013

- Yoo Dong-min
- Hangul: 유동민
- Hanja: 柳東玟
- RR: Yu Dongmin
- MR: Yu Tongmin

Yoo Dong-Min (Korean: 유동민; Hanja: 柳東玟; born 27 March 1989) is a South Korean footballer who currently plays for Gyeongju KHNP.

== Club career ==
Yoo was selected in the priority pick of the 2011 K-League Draft by Gwangju FC.
