= Choi Man-hee =

South Korean footballer and coach

Choi Man-Hee
Personal information
- Full name: Choi Man-Hee
- Date of birth: August 21, 1956 (age 70)
- Place of birth: Gwangju, South Korea
- Position: Midfielder

Youth career
- Years: Team
- Chung-Ang University

Managerial career
- 1980–1981: Namgang High School
- 1982–1990: Pungsang High School
- 1986: South Korea U-17 (Coach)
- 1990–1991: Soongsil University
- 1991: South Korea U-20 (Coach)
- 1991–1994: Hyundai Horangi (Coach)
- 1994–1996: Jeonbuk Hyundai Dinos (Coach)
- 1996–1997: South Korea (Coach)
- 1997–2001: Jeonbuk Hyundai Motors
- 2002–2004: Busan I'Park (Coach)
- 2005–2010: Suwon Samsung Bluewings (Reserves manager)
- 2011–2012: Gwangju FC

Choi Man-Hee (Korean: 최만희, born October 21, 1956) is a former South Korean football player and coach.

He started his coaching career with Namgang High School in 1987. He managed many teams. In 2010, Gwangju FC joined the K-League and he was appointed the first manager of Gwangju FC.
