= Park Ho-jin =

South Korean footballer and coach

Park Ho-Jin 박호진
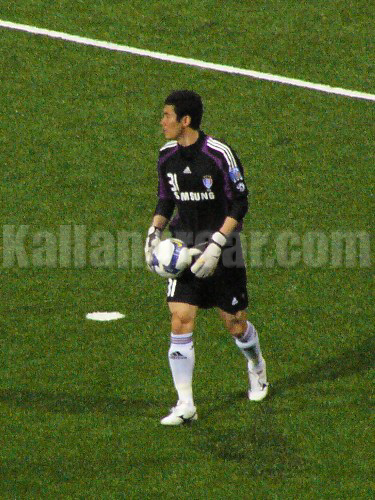

Personal information
- Full name: Park Ho-Jin
- Date of birth: 22 October 1976 (age 50)
- Place of birth: Yeoncheon, Gyeonggi, South Korea
- Height: 1.90 m (6 ft 3 in)
- Position: Goalkeeper

Youth career
- Yonsei University

Senior career*
Years	Team	Apps	(Gls)
1999–2010	Suwon Bluewings	40	(0)
2003–2004	→ Sangmu (army)	14	(0)
2011–2012	Gwangju FC	65	(0)
2013	Gangwon FC	15	(0)

Managerial career
- 2011–2012 2014–: Gwangju FC (Playing coach); Honam University (Coach)
- 2014–: Honam University (Coach)
- * Club domestic league appearances and goals as of 15 December 2013

- Park Ho-jin
- Hangul: 박호진
- Hanja: 朴虎珍
- RR: Bak Hojin
- MR: Pak Hojin

Park Ho-Jin (Korean: 박호진; Hanja: 朴虎珍; born 22 October 1976) is a South Korean former football player and football coach.

== Club career statistics ==
Club performance			League		Cup		League Cup		Continental		Total	
Season	Club	League	Apps	Goals	Apps	Goals	Apps	Goals	Apps	Goals	Apps	Goals
South Korea			League		KFA Cup		League Cup		Asia		Total	
1999	Suwon Bluewings	K-League	0	0	?	?	0	0	?	?		
2000	Suwon Bluewings	K-League	0	0	?	?	1	0	?	?		
2001	Suwon Bluewings	K-League	11	0	?	?	0	0	?	?		
2002	Suwon Bluewings	K-League	5	0	?	?	0	0	?	?		
2003	Gwangju Sangmu Bulsajo	K-League	6	0	0	0	-		-		6	0
2004	Gwangju Sangmu Bulsajo	K-League	8	0	0	0	9	0	-		17	0
2005	Suwon Bluewings	K-League	4	0	0	0	0	0	0	0	4	0
2006	Suwon Bluewings	K-League	15	0	4	0	10	0	-		29	0
2007	Suwon Bluewings	K-League	2	0	1	0	2	0	-		5	0
2008	Suwon Bluewings	K-League	0	0	0	0	0	0	-		0	0
2009	Suwon Bluewings	K-League	3	0	1	0	1	0	2	0	7	0
2010	Suwon Bluewings	K-League	0	0	0	0	0	0	0	0	0	0
2011	Gwangju FC	K-League	30	0	1	0	1	0	-		32	0
Career total			84	0			24	0				
