= Kim Hong-il (footballer) =

South Korean footballer

Personal information
- Full name: Kim Hong-il
- Date of birth: 29 September 1987 (age 39)
- Place of birth: South Korea
- Height: 1.78 m (5 ft 10 in)
- Position: Midfielder

Team information
- Current team: Suwon FC
- Number: 20

Youth career
- Yonsei University

Senior career*
Years	Team	Apps	(Gls)
2009–2010	Suwon Bluewings	4	(0)
2011–2013	Gwangju FC	1	(0)
2012–2013	→ Sangju Sangmu (army)	0	(0)
2014–	Suwon FC	5	(0)

International career^{‡}
2005–2007	South Korea U-20	3	(1)
- * Club domestic league appearances and goals as of 27 November 2015 ‡ National team caps and goals as of 9 October 2009

- Kim Hong-il
- Hangul: 김홍일
- Hanja: 金弘一
- RR: Gim Hongil
- MR: Kim Hongil

Kim Hong-il (Korean: 김홍일; Hanja: 金弘一; born 29 September 1987) is a South Korean footballer who currently plays for Suwon FC in K League Challenge.

== Career statistics ==
As of 31 October 2011

Club performance			League		Cup		League Cup		Continental		Total	
Season	Club	League	Apps	Goals	Apps	Goals	Apps	Goals	Apps	Goals	Apps	Goals
South Korea			League		KFA Cup		League Cup		Asia		Total	
2009	Suwon Bluewings	K-League	4	0	0	0	1	0	2	0	7	0
2010	Suwon Bluewings	K-League	0	0	0	0	0	0	0	0	0	0
2011	Gwangju FC	K-League	1	0	0	0	1	0	-		2	0
2012	Sangju Sangmu	K-League							-			
Career total			5	0	0	0	1	0	2	0	8	0
