= Jeong Woo-in =

South Korean footballer (born 1988)

Jeong Woo-In
Personal information
- Full name: Jeong Woo-In
- Date of birth: 1 February 1988 (age 38)
- Place of birth: Yangsan, Gyeongnam, South Korea
- Height: 1.85 m (6 ft 1 in)
- Position: Defender

Team information
- Current team: FC Pocheon

Youth career
- 2006–2009: Kyung Hee University

Senior career*
Years	Team	Apps	(Gls)
2010	Yongin City FC	22	(5)
2011–2013	Gwangju FC	74	(2)
2014–2015	Gangwon FC	38	(2)
2016	Chungju Hummel	21	(0)
2017–	FC Pocheon		
- * Club domestic league appearances and goals as of 1 December 2016

- Jeong Woo-in
- Hangul: 정우인
- Hanja: 鄭愚仁
- RR: Jeong Uin
- MR: Chŏng Uin

Jeong Woo-In (Korean: 정우인; Hanja: 鄭愚仁; born 1 February 1988) is a South Korean footballer who plays as defender for FC Pocheon in the K3 League.

== Club career ==
Jeong began his senior career with National League side Yongin City FC in 2010, where he appeared in 22 games and scored 5 goals.

Jeong was selected in the 2nd round of the 2011 K-League Draft by Gwangju FC.
