= Park Jeong-min (footballer) =

South Korean footballer

Park Jeong-Min
Personal information
- Full name: Park Jeong-Min
- Date of birth: 25 October 1988 (age 38)
- Place of birth: South Korea
- Height: 1.78 m (5 ft 10 in)
- Position: Forward

Team information
- Current team: Yongin City
- Number: 33

Youth career
- Hannam University

Senior career*
Years	Team	Apps	(Gls)
2012–2013	Gwangju FC	22	(4)
2014–	Yongin City		
- * Club domestic league appearances and goals as of 07 March 2014

Park Jeong-Min (Korean: 박정민; born 25 October 1988) is a South Korean footballer currently playing for Yongin City in the National League, the third tier of South Korean football. He previously played for Gwangju FC.
