= Busan Transportation Corporation FC =

- Full name: Busan Transportation Corporation Football Club 부산 교통공사 축구단
- Nickname: 부산 갈매기 (Busan Galmaegi) Busan Seagull
- Short name: BTC
- Founded: 1 February 2006; 20 years ago
- Ground: Busan Gudeok Stadium
- Capacity: 12,349
- Owner: Busan Transportation Corporation
- Chairman: Kim Ku-Hyun
- Manager: Park Sang-In
- Coach: Kim Gyi Hwa
- League: K3 League
- 2024: K3 League, 13th
- Website: www2.humetro.busan.kr/homepage/football/page/subLocation.do?menu_no=1003010101
Home colours	Away colours

Busan Transportation Corporation Football Club (Korean: 부산 교통공사 축구단) is a semi-professional South Korean football club based in the city of Busan. The club plays in the K3 League, the third tier of football in South Korea. They are owned and operated by Busan Transportation Corporation and play their home games at the Busan Gudeok Stadium, one of the venues for the 1988 Summer Olympics.

== History ==
Founded in February 2006, the club initially played in the Korea National League. In 2011, they reached the National League play-offs, as well as beating K League 1 side Gyeongnam FC in the Korean FA Cup Round of 32. They won their first trophy in 2009 as champions of the National Sports Festival. They won the tournament again in 2013 and retained the title in 2014. They also won the National League Cup in 2010.

== Rivalries ==
The club's biggest rival is Changwon FC. Busan Transportation Corporation FC also has an inter-city derby known as the "Busan Derby" with K League 2 team Busan IPark. The club also has a friendly rivalry with Daejeon Korail, known as the Railroad Derby (Korean: 철도 더비) as both clubs are works team owned by public transit operators.

== Players ==
=== Current squad ===
As of 1 July 2022

Note: Flags indicate national team as defined under FIFA eligibility rules; some limited exceptions apply. Players may hold more than one non-FIFA nationality.

No.	Pos.	Nation	Player
1	GK	KOR	Heo Chang-jin
2	DF	KOR	Ahn Jae-hoon
3	DF	KOR	Kim Min-jun
4	DF	KOR	Noh Dong-geon
5	DF	KOR	Kim Kyu-min
6	MF	KOR	Lim Yoo-seok
7	FW	KOR	Shin Yeong-joon
8	MF	KOR	Chong Hyun-sik
9	FW	KOR	Kim So-woong
10	MF	KOR	Lee Min-woo
11	DF	KOR	Lee Seung-min
12	MF	KOR	Kim Seung-won
13	GK	KOR	Park Cheong-hyo
16	MF	KOR	Kim Jeong-hoon

No.	Pos.	Nation	Player
17	MF	KOR	An Sang-jin
19	MF	KOR	Lee Je-seung
20	DF	KOR	Park Tae-hong
21	MF	KOR	Choi Jun-ho
22	DF	KOR	Kwon Jin-yeong
26	MF	KOR	Park Chang-ho
27	FW	KOR	Hwang Geon-hyeok
28	MF	KOR	Park Young-hoo
30	MF	KOR	Park Jae-hyeon
31	GK	KOR	Park Ji-young
32	MF	KOR	Ha Jee-heun
33	DF	KOR	Cho Jeong-hoon
77	MF	KOR	Han Geon-yong

== Honours ==
=== Domestic competitions ===
==== Cups ====
- National League Championship
  - Winners (1): 2010
- National Sports Festival
  - Gold Medal (4): 2006, 2009, 2013, 2014
- President's Cup
  - Runners-up (1): 2006

== Statistics ==
Season	Korea National League / K3 League											Korean FA Cup	League Cup	Top scorer (League goals)	Manager
Season	Stage	Teams	P	W	D	L	GF	GA	GD	Pts	Position	Korean FA Cup	League Cup	Top scorer (League goals)	Manager
2006	First Stage	11	10	5	4	1	21	14	+7	19	3rd	Preliminary Round	Semifinal	(South Korea) Cho Seong-Rae (6)	(South Korea) Park Sang-In
2006	Second Stage	11	10	3	4	3	13	11	+2	13	7th	Preliminary Round	Semifinal	(South Korea) Cho Seong-Rae (6)	(South Korea) Park Sang-In
2007	First Stage	12	11	3	4	4	15	14	+1	13	7th	Round 1	Quarterfinal	(South Korea) Kim Jin-Il (8) (South Korea) Oh Cheol-Seok (8)	(South Korea) Park Sang-In
2007	Second Stage	12	11	4	3	4	16	16	0	15	5th	Round 1	Quarterfinal	(South Korea) Kim Jin-Il (8) (South Korea) Oh Cheol-Seok (8)	(South Korea) Park Sang-In
2008	First Stage	14	13	8	3	2	27	18	+9	27	2nd	Round 1	Group Round	(South Korea) Kim Jin-Il (18)	(South Korea) Park Sang-In
2008	Second Stage	14	13	5	2	6	22	19	+3	17	9th	Round 1	Group Round	(South Korea) Kim Jin-Il (18)	(South Korea) Park Sang-In
2008	Playoff	4	1	0	0	1	0	2	−2	0	Semifinal	Round 1	Group Round	(South Korea) Kim Jin-Il (18)	(South Korea) Park Sang-In
2009	First Stage	14	13	7	2	4	25	15	+10	23	2nd	Round 1	Semifinal	(South Korea) Lee Yong-Seung (16)	(South Korea) Park Sang-In
2009	Second Stage	13	12	4	1	7	17	20	−3	13	11th	Round 1	Semifinal	(South Korea) Lee Yong-Seung (16)	(South Korea) Park Sang-In
2010	First Stage	15	14	8	3	3	23	13	+10	27	2nd	Round of 32	Winner	(South Korea) Lee Yong-Seung (14)	(South Korea) Park Sang-In
2010	Second Stage	15	14	5	5	4	22	18	+4	20	8th	Round of 32	Winner	(South Korea) Lee Yong-Seung (14)	(South Korea) Park Sang-In
2011	—	14	26	11	8	7	29	27	+2	41	4th	Round of 16	Group Round	(South Korea) Park Seung-Min (10)	(South Korea) Park Sang-In
2011	Playoff	6	1	0	0	1	0	1	−1	0	First Round	Round of 16	Group Round	(South Korea) Park Seung-Min (10)	(South Korea) Park Sang-In
2012	—	14	26	11	8	7	28	23	+5	41	7th	Round of 32	Quarterfinal	(South Korea) Park Seung-Min (7)	(South Korea) Park Sang-In
2013	—	10	27	9	7	11	26	29	-3	34	7th	Second Stage	Group Round		(South Korea) Park Sang-In
2014	—	10	27	12	4	11	30	32	-2	40	5th	Second Stage	Group Round		
2015	—	10	27	5	8	14	24	46	-22	23	10th	Round of 32	Group Round		
2016	—	10	27	6	10	11	26	36	-10	28	8th	Round of 32	Group Round		
2017	—	8	28	5	7	16	22	43	-21	22	8th	Third Round	Group Round		
2018	—	8	28	2	10	16	21	46	-25	16	8th	Round of 32	Group Round		
2019	—	8	28	9	11	8	37	32	+5	38	5th	Third Round	Playoffs		
2020	—	16	22	12	5	5	36	17	+19	41	4th	First Round	—		
2021	—	16	28	11	8	9	32	33	-1	41	6th	Fourth Round	—		Park Sang-in
2022	—	16	30	11	13	6	47	33	14	46	4th	Quarter-finals	—		Kim Gwi-hwa

== See also ==
- List of football clubs in South Korea
- Busan Gudeok Stadium
