= Park Hyun =

South Korean footballer

Personal information
- Date of birth: 24 September 1988 (age 38)
- Place of birth: South Korea
- Height: 1.75 m (5 ft 9 in)
- Position: Midfielder

Team information
- Current team: Gwangju FC
- Number: 37

Youth career
- Incheon University

Senior career*
Years	Team	Apps	(Gls)
2011–2013	Gwangju FC	37	(4)
2014	Cheonan City	12	(1)
2014–	Gwangju FC	12	(0)
- * Club domestic league appearances and goals as of 23 November 2014

- Park Hyun
- Hangul: 박현
- RR: Bak Hyeon
- MR: Pak Hyŏn

Park Hyun (Korean: 박현; born 24 September 1988) is a South Korean footballer who played as a midfielder for Gwangju FC in the K League Challenge.
