= Park Yo-han =

South Korean footballer

Personal information
- Date of birth: 16 January 1989 (age 37)
- Place of birth: South Korea
- Height: 1.77 m (5 ft 9 1/2 in)
- Position: Full back

Team information
- Current team: FC Anyang (on loan from Suwon FC)
- Number: 64

Youth career
- 2004–2006: Kumho High School
- 2007–2010: Yonsei University

Senior career*
Years	Team	Apps	(Gls)
2011–2012	Gwangju FC	5	(0)
2013–2016	Chungju Hummel	63	(0)
2016–2017	→ Asan Mugunghwa (army)	5	(0)
2018	Gwangju FC	27	(0)
2019–	Suwon FC	23	(0)
2020–	→ FC Anyang (Loan)		
- * Club domestic league appearances and goals as of 29 November 2019

- Park Yo-han
- Hangul: 박요한
- RR: Bak Yohan
- MR: Pak Yohan

Park Yo-han (Korean: 박요한; born 16 January 1989) is a South Korean footballer who plays as a full back. He currently plays for Suwon FC.
