= Kim Eun-sun (footballer) =

South Korean footballer

Kim Eun-sun 김은선
Personal information
- Full name: Kim Eun-sun
- Date of birth: 30 March 1988 (age 38)
- Place of birth: South Korea
- Height: 1.82 m (6 ft 0 in)
- Position: Midfielder

Team information
- Current team: Gimhae

Youth career
- 2007–2010: Daegu University

Senior career*
Years	Team	Apps	(Gls)
2011–2013	Gwangju FC	85	(15)
2014–2019	Suwon Samsung Bluewings	53	(5)
2016–2017	→ Ansan Police (army)	33	(3)
2019–2020	Central Coast Mariners	20	(0)
2020–	Gimhae	54	(4)
- * Club domestic league appearances and goals as of 8 October 2022

- Kim Eun-sun
- Hangul: 김은선
- Hanja: 金恩宣
- RR: Gim Eunseon
- MR: Kim Ŭnsŏn

Kim Eun-sun (Korean: 김은선; born 30 March 1988) is a South Korean footballer who plays as a midfielder for Gimhae.

== Club career ==
Kim was selected in the priority pick of the 2011 K-League Draft by Gwangju FC.

=== Central Coast Mariners ===
It was announced on 2 August 2019 that Eun-sun signed a one-year deal with the Central Coast Mariners following a successful trial period.

== Honours ==
=== Club ===
Asan Mugunghwa

- K League Challenge: 2016
