= 2011 Korea National League Championship =

Tournament details
- Country: South Korea
- City: Changwon, Gyeongnam
- Dates: 19–30 June 2011
- Teams: 15

Final positions
- Champions: Hyundai Mipo Dockyard (2nd title)
- Runners-up: Changwon City

Tournament statistics
- Top goal scorer(s): Kim Joon-tae (3 goals)

Awards
- Best player: Wesley Alex

The 2011 Korea National League Championship was the eighth competition of the Korea National League Championship.

Ansan Hallelujah did not participate, but R League team Korean Police participated in the competition as an invited team.

== Group stage ==
=== Group A ===
Pos	Team	Pld	W	D	L	GF	GA	GD	Pts
1	Mokpo City	2	1	1	0	4	3	+1	4
2	Cheonan City	2	1	0	1	4	3	+1	3
3	Busan Transportation Corporation	2	0	1	1	1	3	−2	1

Source: Report
19 June 2011
14:00 UTC+9

Busan Transportation Corporation	0–2	Cheonan City
		Kim Keon-hoo 65'; Kim Tae-ho 84'

Changwon Civic Stadium, Changwon
Attendance: 300
Referee: Kim Dae-yong

21 June 2011
18:00 UTC+9

Busan Transportation Corporation	1–1	Mokpo City
Cha Cheol-ho 26'		Kim Hyun-yong 59'

Changwon Civic Stadium, Changwon
Attendance: 120
Referee: Kim Dong-in

23 June 2011
18:00 UTC+9

Mokpo City	3–2	Cheonan City
Kwon Soon-hak 20' (pen.); Hong Jong-ho 56'; Jo Keon-woo 73'		Kim Yeon-kyo 50'; Kim Keon-hoo 62'

Changwon Civic Stadium, Changwon
Attendance: 0
Referee: Kim Dae-yong

=== Group B ===
Pos	Team	Pld	W	D	L	GF	GA	GD	Pts
1	Incheon Korail	3	2	0	1	6	3	+3	6
2	Hyundai Mipo Dockyard (Note: Hyundai Mipo Dockyard was chosen by the draw for the quarter-finals.)	3	1	1	1	4	4	0	4
3	Suwon City	3	1	1	1	4	4	0	4
4	Chungju Hummel	3	1	0	2	3	6	−3	3

Source: Report
Notes:
19 June 2011
16:00 UTC+9

Chungju Hummel	1–3	Suwon City
Son Kook-hoi 47'		Ko Jae-hyo 64' (pen.); Jang Ji-wook 71'; Park Jong-chan 84'

Changwon Civic Stadium, Changwon
Attendance: 70
Referee: Mae Ho-young

19 June 2011
16:00 UTC+9

Incheon Korail	3–1	Hyundai Mipo Dockyard
Park Joo-ho 4'; Ahn Jung-goo 18'		Kim Ho-yoo 69' (pen.)

Changwon Football Center 2nd stadium, Changwon
Attendance: 200
Referee: Choi Dae-woo

21 June 2011
16:00 UTC+9

Chungju Hummel	2–1	Incheon Korail
Lee Hae-jeong 24'; Lee Se-hwan 60' (o.g.)		Ahn Jung-goo 40'

Changwon Civic Stadium, Changwon
Attendance: 70
Referee: Kim Myung-jae

21 June 2011
16:00 UTC+9

Suwon City	1–1	Hyundai Mipo Dockyard
Ko Jae-hyo 50'		Wesley Alex 1'

Changwon Football Center 2nd stadium, Changwon
Attendance: 100
Referee: Kim Dae-yong

23 June 2011
16:00 UTC+9

Hyundai Mipo Dockyard	2–0	Chungju Hummel
Choi Byung-do 12'; Wesley Alex 90'

Changwon Civic Stadium, Changwon
Attendance: 70
Referee: Mae Ho-young

23 June 2011
16:00 UTC+9

Incheon Korail	2–0	Suwon City
Shin Eun-yeol 52'; Park Joo-ho 64'

Changwon Football Center 2nd stadium, Changwon
Attendance: 0
Referee: Park Byung-jin

=== Group C ===
Pos	Team	Pld	W	D	L	GF	GA	GD	Pts
1	Korean Police	2	1	1	0	3	2	+1	4
2	Changwon City	2	1	0	1	4	2	+2	3
3	Gimhae City	2	0	1	1	1	4	−3	1

Source: Report
20 June 2011
14:00 UTC+9

Changwon City	3–0	Gimhae City
Kim Joon-tae 9'; Ahn Young-jin 23'; Kim Chang-hwi 51'

Changwon Football Center main stadium, Changwon
Attendance: 300
Referee: Mae Ho-young

22 June 2011
18:00 UTC+9

Changwon City	1–2	Korean Police
Kim Joon-tae 38' (pen.)		Kim Young-jong 51'; Kim Do-heon 65'

Masan Stadium, Changwon
Attendance: 200
Referee: Kim Dong-in

24 June 2011
18:00 UTC+9

Korean Police	1–1	Gimhae City
Kim Do-heon 45+1'		Lee Nam-soo 89'

Masan Stadium, Changwon
Attendance: 200
Referee: Kim Myung-jae

=== Group D ===
Pos	Team	Pld	W	D	L	GF	GA	GD	Pts
1	Gangneung City	3	1	2	0	5	2	+3	5
2	Yongin City	3	1	1	1	2	2	0	4
3	Goyang KB Kookmin Bank	3	1	1	1	1	1	0	4
4	Daejeon KHNP	3	1	0	2	2	5	−3	3

Source: Report
20 June 2011
16:00 UTC+9

Daejeon KHNP	0–1	Yongin City
		Seo Young-deok 22'

Changwon Football Center main stadium, Changwon
Attendance: 100
Referee: Park Byung-jin

20 June 2011
16:00 UTC+9

Goyang KB Kookmin Bank	0–0	Gangneung City

Changwon Football Center 3rd stadium, Changwon
Attendance: 200
Referee: Kim Myung-jae

22 June 2011
16:00 UTC+9

Daejeon KHNP	1–0	Goyang KB Kookmin Bank
Kim Chang-hee 12'

Masan Stadium, Changwon
Attendance: 200
Referee: Mae Ho-young

22 June 2011
16:00 UTC+9

Yongin City	1–1	Gangneung City
Shin Jun-soo 69'		Lee Jung-woon 30'

Changwon Football Center 3rd stadium, Changwon
Attendance: 100
Referee: Choi Dae-woo

24 June 2011
16:00 UTC+9

Gangneung City	4–1	Daejeon KHNP
Kim Tae-jin 7'; Kim Chang-hee 48'; Kim Joon-bum 69', 82'		Hong Hyung-ki 52'

Masan Stadium, Changwon
Attendance: 100
Referee: Mae Ho-young

24 June 2011
16:00 UTC+9

Goyang KB Kookmin Bank	1–0	Yongin City
Kim Young-nam 60'

Changwon Football Center 3rd stadium, Changwon
Attendance: 100
Referee: Park Byung-jin

== Knockout stage ==
=== Bracket ===
Quarter-finals
A1	Mokpo City	1
C2	Changwon City	2
B1	Incheon Korail (p)	0 (4)
D2	Yongin City	0 (3)
C1	Korean Police	1
A2	Cheonan City	0
D1	Gangneung City	2 (3)
B2	Hyundai Mipo Dockyard (p)	2 (4)

Semi-finals
Changwon City (a.e.t.)	3
Incheon Korail	2
Korean Police	0
Hyundai Mipo Dockyard	1

Final
Changwon City	0
Hyundai Mipo Dockyard	3

=== Quarter-finals ===
26 June 2011
16:00 UTC+9

Mokpo City	1–2	Changwon City
Yang Dong-hyub 17'		Kim Je-hwan 14'; Kim Chang-hwi 72'

Changwon Civic Stadium, Changwon
Attendance: 100
Referee: Mae Ho-young

26 June 2011
16:00 UTC+9

Incheon Korail	0–0 (a.e.t.)	Yongin City
Penalties
	4–3

Masan Stadium, Changwon
Attendance: 50
Referee: Kim Dae-yong

26 June 2011
18:00 UTC+9

Korean Police	1–0	Cheonan City
Lee Yong-seung 89'

Changwon Civic Stadium, Changwon
Attendance: 100
Referee: Kim Dong-in

26 June 2011
19:00 UTC+9

Gangneung City	2–2 (a.e.t.)	Hyundai Mipo Dockyard
Wi Hyo-jun 2'; Kim Tae-bong 33'		Yoon Joo-hae 7'; Danilo Teixeira 48'
Penalties
	3–4

Masan Stadium, Changwon
Attendance: 70
Referee: Park Byung-jin

=== Semi-finals ===
28 June 2011
16:00 UTC+9

Changwon City	3–2 (a.e.t.)	Incheon Korail
Kim Joon-tae 5'; Lim Jong-wook 18'; Lee Kil-yong 116'	Report	Lee Seung-joon 1'; Heo Sin-young 71'

Changwon Football Center main stadium, Changwon
Attendance: 200
Referee: Kim Myung-jae

28 June 2011
19:00 UTC+9

Korean Police	0–1	Hyundai Mipo Dockyard
	Report	Song Won-jae 16'

Changwon Football Center main stadium, Changwon
Attendance: 100
Referee: Kim Dae-yong

=== Final ===
30 June 2011
14:00 UTC+9

Changwon City	0–3	Hyundai Mipo Dockyard
	Report	Song Won-jae 13'; Danilo Teixeira 60'; Lee Jin-woo 81'

Changwon Football Center main stadium, Changwon
Attendance: 500
Referee: Mae Ho-young

== See also ==
- 2011 in South Korean football
- 2011 Korea National League
