= Park Jae-hyun (footballer) =

South Korean footballer

Park Jae-Hyun
Personal information
- Full name: Park Jae-Hyun (박재현)
- Date of birth: 29 October 1980 (age 46)
- Place of birth: South Korea
- Height: 1.78 m (5 ft 10 in)
- Position: Forward

Senior career*
Years	Team	Apps	(Gls)
2003	Daegu FC	3	(0)
2004	Ulsan Hyundai Mipo Dockyard	15	(6)
2005–2009	Incheon United	58	(12)
2010	Ethnikos Piraeus	1	(0)
2010	Ulsan Hyundai Mipo Dockyard	10	(1)
2011	Yongin City	16	(4)
2012	Sporting Goa	1	(0)
2012–2013	Samut Songkhram F.C.	38	(3)
- * Club domestic league appearances and goals as of 13:54, 28 May 2009 (UTC)

Park Jae-Hyun (born 29 October 1980) is a South Korean footballer who currently plays for Samut Songkhram F.C.

== Career ==
Park has played for K-League side Incheon United from 2005 to 2009 season, and previously played for K-League side Daegu FC, Ulsan Hyundai Mipo Dockyard Dolphin and Yongin City FC in the Korea National League. Also he played for Ethnikos Piraeus in the Greek Beta Ethniki but went back to his previous team Ulsan Hyundai Mipo Dockyard in 6 months.

=== Sporting Goa ===
On January 18, 2012 Park officially signed for Sporting Clube de Goa in the I-League in India and made his debut the next day.

== Club history ==
=== Club career statistics ===
As of 19 January 2012

Club performance			League		Cup		League Cup		Total		
Season	Club	League	Apps	Goals	Apps	Goals	Apps	Goals	Apps	Goals	
South Korea			League		KFA Cup		League Cup		Total		
2003	Daegu FC	K-League	3	0	0	0	-		3	0	
2004	Ulsan Hyundai Mipo	K2 League	15	6	1	0	-		16	6	
2005	Incheon United	K-League	0	0	1	0	4	0	5	0	
2006	Incheon United	K-League	4	0	2	0	13	0	19	0	
2007	Incheon United	K-League	22	1	4	2	9	4	35	7	
2008	Incheon United	K-League	20	0	0	0	9	0	29	0	
2009	Incheon United	K-League	12	0	1	0	4	0	17	0	
Greece			League		Greek Cup		League Cup		Total		
2009–10	Ethnikos Piraeus	Beta Ethniki			0	0	-				
South Korea			League		KFA Cup		League Cup		Total		
2010	Ulsan Hyundai Mipo	National League	10	1	-		-		10	1	
2011	Yongin City	National League	16	4	-		-		16	4	
India			League		Durand Cup		League Cup		Total		
2011–12	Sporting Goa	I-League	1	0	-		-		-	1	0
Total	South Korea		102	9	9	2	39	4	140	18	
Total	Greece										
Career total			1	0	0	0	0	0	1	0	
Total			103	9	9	2	39	4	141	18	
