= List of foreign Korea National League players =

This is a list of foreign players in the Korea National League.

- Players in **bold** are currently playing in the Korea National League.
- As for dual citizen, nationality is listed under Korea National League player official registration.
- Foreign players system was introduced in the 2010 season.

== Asia (AFC) ==
=== China PR ===
- Bai Zijian (2012 Goyang KB Kookmin Bank)

== Europe (UEFA) ==
=== France ===
- Ugo Gostisbehere (2014 Gimhae FC)

=== Serbia ===
- Ivan Marković (2013 Gimhae FC)

== South America (CONMEBOL) ==
=== Argentina ===
- Emmanuel Frances (2011 Ansan Hallelujah)

=== Brazil ===
- Naldinho (2010 Suwon FC)
- Vinicius (2010 Ulsan Hyundai Mipo Dockyard)
- Alex (2010–2011 Ulsan Hyundai Mipo Dockyard)
- Danilo (2011 Ulsan Hyundai Mipo Dockyard)
- Roni (2011–2012 Ulsan Hyundai Mipo Dockyard)
- Thiago Santos (2012 Ulsan Hyundai Mipo Dockyard)
- Alex Rafael (2014 Ulsan Hyundai Mipo Dockyard)
- Ricardo Augusto (2014 Ulsan Hyundai Mipo Dockyard)
- Allisson Ricardo (2014 Ulsan Hyundai Mipo Dockyard)

== See also ==
- Korea National League
