= 2003 K2 League =

Hyundai Motors, Intermax K2 League
- Season: 2003
- Champions: Goyang Kookmin Bank (1st title)
- Matches: 92
- Goals: 238 (2.59 per match)
- Best Player: First stage: Jang Hyeon-ho; Second stage: Lee Do-kweon; Playoff: Kim Ki-jong
- Top goalscorer: First stage: Lee Seong-gil; Second stage: Lee Hyeon-dong
- Best goalkeeper: First stage: Jin Sang-ol; Second stage: Kim Ji-woon
- Biggest home win: HMD 4–0 Hummel (6 September 2003)
- Biggest away win: Seosan 0–5 Seoul (19 October 2003)
- Highest scoring: Gangneung 3–5 Hallelujah (19 April 2003)
- Longest winning run: 5 matches Goyang Kookmin Bank
- Longest unbeaten run: 11 matches Goyang Kookmin Bank
- Longest winless run: 18 matches Daejeon KHNP
- Longest losing run: 5 matches Uijeongbu Hummel Korea

The 2003 K2 League was the first season of the Korea National League, the second-highest division of the South Korean football league system at the time. The league was divided into two stages, and the winners of each stage qualified for the championship playoff.

== Regular season ==
=== First stage ===
Pos	Team	Pld	W	D	L	GF	GA	GD	Pts	
1	Gimpo Kookmin Bank	9	6	2	1	14	6	+8	20	Qualification for the playoff
2	Hyundai Mipo Dockyard	9	5	2	2	13	7	+6	17	
3	Iksan Hallelujah	9	4	3	2	20	15	+5	15	
4	Icheon Sangmu	9	4	2	3	15	13	+2	14	
5	Incheon Korail	9	3	4	2	14	10	+4	13	
6	Suwon City	9	3	3	3	11	12	−1	12	
7	Seosan Citizen	9	3	2	4	14	15	−1	11	
8	Gangneung City	9	2	4	3	12	15	−3	10	
9	Uijeongbu Hummel Korea	9	2	1	6	10	20	−10	7	
10	Daejeon KHNP	9	0	3	6	5	15	−10	3	

Source: RSSSF

=== Second stage ===
Pos	Team	Pld	W	D	L	GF	GA	GD	Pts	
1	Icheon Sangmu	9	5	4	0	18	9	+9	19	Qualification for the playoff
2	Goyang Kookmin Bank (Note: Kookmin Bank moved from Gimpo to Goyang.)	9	5	4	0	13	5	+8	19	
3	Suwon City	9	5	2	2	10	5	+5	17	
4	Ulsan Mipo Dolphins	9	3	4	2	11	5	+6	13	
5	Seoul City (Note: Iksan Hallelujah was banned from continuing the league for losing their hometown by Won Buddhists. Seoul City joined the league as a replacement.)	9	4	0	5	11	10	+1	12	
6	Uijeongbu Hummel Korea	9	3	3	3	10	13	−3	12	
7	Seosan Citizen	9	2	5	2	10	14	−4	11	
8	Gangneung City	9	2	2	5	9	12	−3	8	
9	Incheon Korail	9	1	2	6	5	14	−9	5	
10	Daejeon KHNP	9	0	4	5	4	14	−10	4	

Source: RSSSF

== Championship playoff ==
=== Summary ===
Team 1	Agg.	Team 2	1st leg	2nd leg
Icheon Sangmu	4–5	Goyang Kookmin Bank (C)	2–3	2–2 (a.e.t.)

=== Results ===
November 15

Icheon Sangmu	2–3	Goyang Kookmin Bank
Park Kyung-sam 29'; Lee Do-kweon 87'		Kim Yoon-dong 27'; Lee Soo-chul 44'; Ko Min-ki 78'

Icheon City Stadium, Icheon

November 19

Goyang Kookmin Bank	2–2 (a.e.t.)	Icheon Sangmu
Kim Ki-jong 37' 105'		Park Ki-wook 35'; Lee Gwang-jae 54'

Goyang Stadium, Goyang

Goyang Kookmin Bank won 5–4 on aggregate.

== See also ==
- 2003 in South Korean football
- 2003 Korean FA Cup
