= Ho-young =

- Hangul: 호영
- RR: Hoyeong
- MR: Hoyŏng

Ho-young, also spelled Ho-yeong or Ho-yeung, is a Korean given name. Notable people with the name include:

- Ahn Ho-young, South Korean diplomat
- Byun Ho-young (born 1945), South Korean football goalkeeper
- Joo Ho-young, South Korean judge and politician
- Ho-Young Kim, professor of mechanical engineering at Seoul National University
- Kim Ho-young (actor), South Korean actor
- Kim Ho-young (footballer) (born 1969), South Korean football manager and former player
- Kim Ho-yeong, South Korean football defender
- Park Ho-young (born 1999), South Korean football defender
- Son Ho-young, South Korean singer and actor
- Song Ho-young, South Korean radiologist
- Song Ho-young (footballer) (born 1988), South Korean football forward
- Sung Ho-yeung (born 1999), South Korean football winger
