= Hwang Gyu-beom =

South Korean footballer (born 1989)

Personal information
- Full name: Hwang Gyu-beom
- Date of birth: 30 August 1989 (age 37)
- Place of birth: South Korea
- Height: 1.77 m (5 ft 9 1/2 in)
- Position: Defender

Team information
- Current team: Goyang Hi FC
- Number: 22

Youth career
- 2008: Sangji University

Senior career*
Years	Team	Apps	(Gls)
2009–	Goyang Hi FC	118	(4)
- * Club domestic league appearances and goals as of 20 December 2015

Hwang Gyu-beom (Korean: 황규범; born 30 August 1989) is a South Korean footballer who plays as defender for Goyang Hi FC in K League Challenge.

== Career ==
He joined Korea National League side Ansan Hallelujah in 2008. Hwang made his professional debut in the 2013 K League Challenge match on 27 April 2013 after the team joined the professional second division in 2013.
