= 2011 Korea National League =

Samsung Life Korea National League
- Season: 2011
- Dates: 12 March – 5 November 2011
- Champions: Hyundai Mipo Dockyard (3rd title)
- Matches: 182
- Goals: 460 (2.53 per match)
- Best Player: Jo Seong-won
- Top goalscorer: Danilo Teixeira; Hong Hyung-gi; Park Seung-min; Kim Je-hwan; Hwang Ho-ryung (10 goals each)
- Biggest home win: Gangneung 4–0 Hummel (21 May 2011)
- Highest scoring: KHNP 4–6 HMD (29 October 2011)
- Longest winning run: 8 matches Hyundai Mipo Dockyard
- Longest unbeaten run: 10 matches Hyundai Mipo Dockyard
- Highest attendance: 3,800; Gangneung 3–0 Hallelujah (24 September 2011)

The 2011 Korea National League was the ninth season of the Korea National League. The number of post-season playoffs' teams were increased to six and the playoffs were operated in the same format as the K League Championship. Before the start of the 2011 season, Yesan FC withdrew from the league due to financial difficulties.

== Teams ==
Locations of the 2011 Korea National League clubs

Team	City	Stadium	Foreign players
Ansan Hallelujah	Ansan	Ansan Wa~ Stadium	(Argentina) Emmanuel Frances
Busan Transportation Corporation	Busan	Busan Gudeok Stadium	
Changwon City	Changwon	Changwon Football Center	
Cheonan City	Cheonan	Cheonan Stadium	
Chungju Hummel	Chungju	Chungju Stadium	
Daejeon KHNP	Daejeon	Daejeon Hanbat Stadium	
Gangneung City	Gangneung	Gangneung Stadium	
Gimhae City	Gimhae	Gimhae Stadium	
Goyang KB Kookmin Bank	Goyang	Goyang Stadium; Uijeongbu Stadium	
Hyundai Mipo Dockyard	Ulsan	Ulsan Stadium	(Brazil) Wesley Alex (Brazil) Danilo Teixeira (Brazil) Roni da Silva
Incheon Korail	Incheon	Incheon Munhak Stadium practice pitch	
Mokpo City	Mokpo	Mokpo International Football Center	
Suwon City	Suwon	Suwon Sports Complex; Suwon World Cup Stadium auxiliary pitch	
Yongin City	Yongin	Yongin Football Center	

== Regular season ==
=== League table ===
Pos	Team	Pld	W	D	L	GF	GA	GD	Pts	Qualification
1	Hyundai Mipo Dockyard	26	17	2	7	53	34	+19	53	Qualification for the playoffs final
2	Goyang KB Kookmin Bank	26	13	8	5	37	25	+12	47	Qualification for the playoffs semi-final
3	Gangneung City	26	12	10	4	40	25	+15	46	Qualification for the playoffs first round
4	Busan Transportation Corporation	26	11	8	7	29	27	+2	41	Qualification for the playoffs first round
5	Changwon City	26	11	7	8	37	36	+1	40	Qualification for the playoffs first round
6	Incheon Korail	26	11	6	9	29	23	+6	39	Qualification for the playoffs first round
7	Suwon City	26	8	11	7	28	23	+5	35	
8	Daejeon KHNP	26	9	8	9	40	38	+2	35	
9	Cheonan City	26	9	8	9	31	31	0	35	
10	Gimhae City	26	10	3	13	39	44	−5	33	
11	Yongin City	26	5	11	10	22	32	−10	26	
12	Ansan Hallelujah	26	5	8	13	25	42	−17	23	
13	Mokpo City	26	5	6	15	25	36	−11	21	
14	Chungju Hummel	26	5	6	15	25	44	−19	21	

Source: Korea National League (in Korean)
Rules for classification: 1) Points; 2) Goal difference; 3) Goals scored.

=== Results ===
Home \ Away	ASH	BTC	CWC	CAC	CJH	DHN	GNC	GHC	GKB	HMD	ICK	MPC	SWC	YIC
Ansan Hallelujah	—	0–0	2–1	1–1	1–1	2–3	0–0	0–1	1–2	1–5	0–2	1–0	1–1	0–0
Busan Transportation Corporation	2–2	—	4–2	2–0	1–0	1–0	1–1	3–3	1–2	3–2	0–0	1–0	0–2	1–0
Changwon City	2–1	1–0	—	1–1	2–3	3–2	1–0	1–0	2–0	1–0	0–0	2–0	1–0	0–0
Cheonan City	0–1	2–2	2–1	—	1–0	1–0	0–0	0–1	1–2	2–1	1–0	4–1	1–0	1–1
Chungju Hummel	2–1	0–1	1–1	3–0	—	1–2	2–7	2–3	0–1	0–1	0–1	1–1	2–1	1–1
Daejeon KHNP	3–2	0–0	0–1	2–2	3–0	—	1–1	0–1	2–2	4–6	2–1	2–1	0–0	3–0
Gangneung City	3–0	1–0	2–2	1–0	4–0	1–0	—	4–3	2–2	2–1	1–0	2–1	1–1	1–1
Gimhae City	3–1	0–1	4–1	1–3	0–1	3–3	3–1	—	1–2	0–3	0–2	3–2	1–0	3–1
Goyang KB Kookmin Bank	4–1	2–1	3–1	2–2	3–1	1–2	0–0	1–0	—	3–0	1–3	0–0	0–1	0–0
Hyundai Mipo Dockyard	2–2	2–0	3–2	3–1	1–0	1–2	2–1	2–0	2–0	—	3–1	2–1	3–2	1–0
Incheon Korail	2–1	1–2	1–1	1–3	0–0	3–1	3–0	3–1	0–0	2–1	—	0–3	0–0	2–0
Mokpo City	0–1	1–1	2–3	2–1	2–2	1–0	0–1	1–0	0–2	1–2	0–1	—	1–1	2–1
Suwon City	1–0	3–0	4–3	1–0	2–1	2–2	1–1	2–0	0–0	2–2	0–1	1–1	—	0–0
Yongin City	2–1	0–1	1–1	1–1	3–1	1–1	0–2	4–4	1–2	1–2	1–0	0–2	1–0	—

Source: Korea National League (in Korean)
Legend: Blue = home team win; Yellow = draw; Red = away team win.

== Championship playoffs ==
=== Bracket ===
First round
3	Gangneung City	3
6	Incheon Korail	2
4	Busan Transportation Corporation	0
5	Changwon City	1

Second round
Gangneung City	1
Changwon City	3

Semifinal
2	Goyang KB Kookmin Bank (a.e.t.)	3
Changwon City	2

Final
1	Hyundai Mipo Dockyard	1	1	2
Goyang KB Kookmin Bank	1	0	1

=== First round ===
5 November 2011
15:00 KST

Gangneung City	3–2	Incheon Korail
Kim Joon-beom 19'; Chang Hyuk-jin 51'; Kim Jae-chun 82'		Kim Hyung-woon 22', 42'

Gangneung Stadium, Gangneung
Attendance: 1,500

5 November 2011
15:00 KST

Busan Transportation Corporation	0–1	Changwon City
		Kim Je-hwan 86'

Busan Gudeok Stadium, Busan
Attendance: 300

=== Second round ===
9 November 2011
19:00 KST

Gangneung City	1–3	Changwon City
Kim Tae-bong 82'		Song Geun-soo 13', 45+1'; Choi Myung-sung 44'

Gangneung Stadium, Gangneung
Attendance: 1,000

=== Semi-final ===
12 November 2011
15:00 KST

Goyang KB Kookmin Bank	3–2 (a.e.t.)	Changwon City
Park Sung-jin 1'; Kim Young-nam 77'; Song Geun-soo 113' (o.g.)		Lee Sang-keun 10'; Choi Myung-sung 88'

Goyang Stadium, Goyang
Attendance: 670

=== Final ===
16 November 2011
19:00 KST

Goyang KB Kookmin Bank	1–1	Hyundai Mipo Dockyard
Kim Young-nam 40'		Jeong Seon-ho 55'

Goyang Stadium, Goyang
Attendance: 1,050

20 November 2011
16:00 KST

Hyundai Mipo Dockyard	1–0	Goyang KB Kookmin Bank
Kim Hyo-ki 37'

Ulsan Sports Complex Stadium, Ulsan
Attendance: 2,100

Hyundai Mipo Dockyard won 2–1 on aggregate.

== Top scorers ==
As of 29 October 2011

Danilo Teixeira who played the least time among top goalscorers won the top goalscorer award

Rank	Player	Club	Goals
1	(Brazil) Danilo Teixeira	Hyundai Mipo Dockyard	10
1	(South Korea) Hong Hyung-gi	Daejeon KHNP	10
1	(South Korea) Park Seung-min	Busan Transportation Corporation	10
1	(South Korea) Kim Je-hwan	Changwon City	10
1	(South Korea) Hwang Ho-ryung	Cheonan City	10
6	(Brazil) Wesley Alex	Hyundai Mipo Dockyard	9
6	(South Korea) Kim Han-won	Suwon City	9
8	(South Korea) Yoon Tae-hyun	Gimhae City	8
8	(South Korea) Park Sung-jin	Goyang KB Kookmin Bank	8
8	(South Korea) Lim Jong-wook	Changwon City	8
8	(South Korea) Kim Won-min	Gimhae City	8

== Awards ==
=== Main awards ===
Award	Winner	Club
Most Valuable Player	(South Korea) Jo Seong-won	Hyundai Mipo Dockyard
Top goalscorer	(Brazil) Danilo Teixeira	Hyundai Mipo Dockyard
Top assist provider	(South Korea) Lee Sang-woo	Goyang KB Kookmin Bank
Manager of the Year	(South Korea) Cho Min-kook	Hyundai Mipo Dockyard
Club of the Year	Suwon City	
Fair Play Award	Incheon Korail	

=== Best XI ===
Position	Winner	Club
Goalkeeper	(South Korea) Woo Je-myeong	Incheon Korail
Defenders	(South Korea) Kim Hyo-joon	Goyang KB Kookmin Bank
Defenders	(South Korea) Lee Sang-woo	Goyang KB Kookmin Bank
Defenders	(South Korea) Ahn Seon-tae	Daejeon KHNP
Defenders	(South Korea) Jo Seong-won	Hyundai Mipo Dockyard
Midfielders	(South Korea) Kim Won-min	Gimhae City
Midfielders	(South Korea) Park Seung-min	Busan Transportation Corporation
Midfielders	(South Korea) Jeong Seon-ho	Hyundai Mipo Dockyard
Midfielders	(South Korea) Lim Jong-wook	Changwon City
Forwards	(South Korea) Hong Hyung-gi	Daejeon KHNP
Forwards	(Brazil) Wesley Alex	Hyundai Mipo Dockyard

== See also ==
- 2011 in South Korean football
- 2011 Korea National League Championship
- 2011 Korean FA Cup
