= 2006 Korea National League =

STC Cup Korea National League
- Season: 2006
- Dates: 7 April – 26 November 2006
- Champions: Goyang Kookmin Bank (3rd title)
- Matches: 112
- Goals: 310 (2.77 per match)
- Best Player: Choi Jung-min
- Top goalscorer: Kim Young-hoo (19 goals)
- Biggest home win: Kookmin 7–0 Gangneung (3 June 2006)
- Biggest away win: KHNP 1–5 Korail (3 October 2006)
- Highest scoring: Hummel 3–6 HMD (12 September 2006)
- Longest winning run: 5 matches Goyang Kookmin Bank
- Longest unbeaten run: 10 matches Goyang Kookmin Bank
- Longest winless run: 10 matches Icheon Hummel Korea; Seosan Citizen
- Longest losing run: 6 matches Gangneung City

The 2006 Korea National League was the fourth season of the Korea National League, the second-highest division of the South Korean football league system at the time. The league was divided into two stages, and the winners of each stage qualified for the championship playoff.

== Regular season ==
=== First stage ===
Pos	Team	Pld	W	D	L	GF	GA	GD	Pts	Qualification
1	Goyang Kookmin Bank	10	8	2	0	26	8	+18	26	Qualification for the playoff
2	Changwon City	10	7	0	3	20	13	+7	21	
3	Busan Kyotong	10	5	4	1	21	14	+7	19	
4	Hyundai Mipo Dockyard	10	6	1	3	23	17	+6	19	
5	Suwon City	10	4	4	2	14	11	+3	16	
6	Incheon Korail	10	4	3	3	14	13	+1	15	
7	Gimpo Hallelujah	10	3	3	4	11	12	−1	12	
8	Seosan Citizen	10	2	3	5	7	14	−7	9	
9	Daejeon KHNP	10	1	3	6	8	15	−7	6	
10	Icheon Hummel Korea	10	0	4	6	6	17	−11	4	
11	Gangneung City	10	1	1	8	5	21	−16	4	

Source: RSSSF

=== Second stage ===
Pos	Team	Pld	W	D	L	GF	GA	GD	Pts	Qualification
1	Gimpo Hallelujah	10	7	2	1	16	8	+8	23	Qualification for the playoff
2	Hyundai Mipo Dockyard	10	7	1	2	25	13	+12	22	
3	Suwon City	10	5	4	1	17	10	+7	19	
4	Incheon Korail	10	5	3	2	16	8	+8	18	
5	Gangneung City	10	4	4	2	14	11	+3	16	
6	Goyang Kookmin Bank	10	4	2	4	12	10	+2	14	
7	Busan Kyotong	10	3	4	3	13	11	+2	13	
8	Icheon Hummel Korea	10	2	3	5	13	18	−5	9	
9	Daejeon KHNP	10	2	2	6	10	22	−12	8	
10	Changwon City	10	1	3	6	11	22	−11	6	
11	Seosan Citizen	10	0	2	8	6	20	−14	2	

Source: RSSSF

== Championship playoff ==
=== Summary ===
Team 1	Agg.	Team 2	1st leg	2nd leg
Gimpo Hallelujah	0–2	Goyang Kookmin Bank (C)	0–0	0–2

=== Results ===
November 22

Gimpo Hallelujah	0–0	Goyang Kookmin Bank

Gimpo City Stadium, Gimpo

November 26

Goyang Kookmin Bank	2–0	Gimpo Hallelujah
Yoon Bo-young 31'; Ko Min-ki 63'

Goyang Stadium, Goyang

Goyang Kookmin Bank won 2–0 on aggregate.

== Awards ==
=== Main awards ===
Award	Winner	Club
Most Valuable Player	(South Korea) Choi Jung-min	Goyang Kookmin Bank
Top goalscorer	(South Korea) Kim Young-hoo	Hyundai Mipo Dockyard
Top assist provider	(South Korea) Lee Sung-kil	Gimpo Hallelujah
Manager of the Year	(South Korea) Lee Woo-hyung	Goyang Kookmin Bank
Fair Play Award	Hyundai Mipo Dockyard	

=== Best XI ===
Position	Winner	Club
Goalkeeper	(South Korea) Kim Tae-young	Goyang Kookmin Bank
Defenders	(South Korea) Ha Yong-woo	Daejeon KHNP
Defenders	(South Korea) Lee Chang-keun	Icheon Hummel Korea
Defenders	(South Korea) Yoon Keun-ho	Seosan Citizen
Defenders	(South Korea) Yoo Jin-oh	Gangneung City
Midfielders	(South Korea) Kim Ki-beom	Busan Transportation Corporation
Midfielders	(South Korea) Choi Myung-sung	Changwon City
Midfielders	(South Korea) Oh Jung-seok	Suwon City
Midfielders	(South Korea) Cho Sung-won	Incheon Korail
Forwards	(South Korea) Kim Young-hoo	Hyundai Mipo Dockyard
Forwards	(South Korea) Park Do-hyun	Gimpo Hallelujah

== See also ==
- 2006 in South Korean football
- 2006 Korea National League Championship
- 2006 Korean FA Cup
