= Park Byung-won =

South Korean footballer

Park Byung-Won
Personal information
- Full name: Park Byung-Won
- Date of birth: 2 September 1983 (age 43)
- Place of birth: South Korea
- Height: 1.76 m (5 ft 9 1/2 in)
- Position: Midfielder

Team information
- Current team: Goyang Hi FC
- Number: 15

Youth career
- Kyung Hee University

Senior career*
Years	Team	Apps	(Gls)
2007–2012	Goyang KB	101	(29)
2013	FC Anyang	29	(6)
2014–	Goyang Hi FC	34	(3)
- * Club domestic league appearances and goals as of 28 November 2014

Park Byung-Won (Korean: 박병원; born 2 September 1983) is a South Korean footballer who plays as midfielder for Goyang Hi FC in K League Challenge.

== Career ==
He was selected by FC Anyang in 2013 K League Draft.
