= Kang Jin-woong =

South Korean footballer

Personal information
- Full name: Kang Jin-woong
- Date of birth: 1 May 1985 (age 41)
- Place of birth: South Korea
- Height: 1.85 m (6 ft 1 in)
- Position: Goalkeeper

Team information
- Current team: Goyang Hi FC
- Number: 1

Youth career
- Sunmoon University

Senior career*
Years	Team	Apps	(Gls)
2008–2010	Incheon Korail	27	(0)
2011–	Goyang Hi FC	129	(0)
- * Club domestic league appearances and goals as of 1 December 2016

Kang Jin-woong (Korean: 강진웅; born 1 May 1985) is a South Korean footballer who plays as goalkeeper for Goyang Hi FC in K League Challenge.

== Career ==
Kang signed with Incheon Korail in 2008.

He joined Ansan H FC in 2011.
