= Lee Do-kweon =

South Korean footballer (born 1979)

Lee Do-Kweon
Personal information
- Full name: Lee Do-Kweon
- Date of birth: August 8, 1979 (age 47)
- Place of birth: South Korea
- Height: 1.75 m (5 ft 9 in)
- Position: Midfielder

Youth career
- Sungkyunkwan University

Senior career*
Years	Team	Apps	(Gls)
2002–2003	Icheon Sangmu (Army)	not joined K1	
2004–2005	Goyang KB Kookmin Bank		
2006	Jeonbuk Hyundai Motors	4	(0)
2007	Goyang KB Kookmin Bank	3	(0)
2007–2008	Újpest FC	7	(1)
2008–2010	Gangneung City	20	(1)
2010	Gimhae City	15	(0)
- * Club domestic league appearances and goals

Lee Do-Kweon (born 8 August 1979) is a South Korean former football player.

Lee made seven Hungarian NB I appearances for Újpest FC during the 2007–08 season. He also played domestically for Icheon Sangmu (while he was in the army), Goyang KB Kookmin Bank, Jeonbuk Hyundai Motors, Gangneung City and Gimhae City FC.
