= Lee Soo-gil =

South Korean footballer (born 1979)

Lee Soo-Gil
Personal information
- Full name: Lee Soo-Gil
- Date of birth: 9 April 1979 (age 47)
- Place of birth: South Korea
- Height: 1.79 m (5 ft 10 1/2 in)
- Position: Defender

Senior career*
| Years | Team | Apps | (Gls) |
| 2002 | Pohang Steelers | 0 | (0) |
| 2003–2013 | Suwon FC | 192 | (4) |
- * Club domestic league appearances and goals

Lee Soo-Gil (Korean: 이수길; born 9 April 1979) is a South Korean retired footballer who last played for Suwon FC in the K League Challenge.

== Career ==
He joined the Pohang Steelers in 2002 but made no appearance for the team.

He moved to Suwon FC in 2003. He made his professional return on 16 March 2013 after Suwon FC participated in K League Challenge from the semi-professional Korea National League.
