= Icheon Sangmu FC =

1999–2005 South Korean football club

- Full name: Icheon Sangmu Football Club 이천 상무 축구단
- Founded: 1999; 27 years ago
- Dissolved: 2005; 21 years ago
- Ground: Icheon Stadium
- Owner: Korea Armed Forces Athletic Corps
Home colours	Away colours

Icheon Sangmu Football Club (Korean: 이천 상무 FC) was a South Korean football club based in Icheon. They played in the Korea National League.

== Season-by-season records ==
=== Korea National League ===
Icheon Sangmu
Season	Stage	Teams	P	W	D	L	GF	GA	GD	Pts	Position	League Cup	Top scorer (League goals)
2003	First Stage	10	9	4	2	3	15	13	+2	14	4th	None	(South Korea) Lee Gwang-jae (7)
2003	Second Stage	10	9	5	4	0	18	9	+9	19	1st	None	(South Korea) Lee Gwang-jae (7)
2003	Playoff	2	2	0	1	1	4	5	−1	1	Runner-up	None	(South Korea) Lee Gwang-jae (7)
2004	First Stage	10	9	6	1	2	12	9	+3	19	3rd	Group stage	(South Korea) Kim Man-joong (3) (South Korea) Park Jung-hwan (3)
2004	Second Stage	10	9	2	4	3	11	12	−1	10	6th	Group stage	(South Korea) Kim Man-joong (3) (South Korea) Park Jung-hwan (3)
2005	First Stage	11	10	4	3	3	11	8	+3	15	6th	Semi-finals	(South Korea) Oh Jung-seok (7)
2005	Second Stage	11	10	5	3	2	11	6	+5	18	2nd	Semi-finals	(South Korea) Oh Jung-seok (7)

== See also ==
- List of football clubs in South Korea
- Sangju Sangmu FC
