= Won-jae =

- Hangul: 원재
- RR: Wonjae
- MR: Wŏnjae

Won-jae is a Korean given name.

People with this name include:

- Park Won-jae (born 1984), South Korean footballer
- Lee Won-jae (born 1986), South Korean footballer
- Song Won-jae (born 1989), South Korean footballer
- Eun Won-jae (born 1994), South Korean actor

Fictional characters with this name include:

- Hyun Won-jae, in 2007–2010 South Korean manhwa series The Breaker
- Park Won-jae, in 2008 South Korean film Crazy Waiting
- Choi Won-jae, in 2013 South Korean television series Empire of Gold

== See also ==
- List of Korean given names
