= Choi Pil-soo =

South Korean footballer (born 1991)

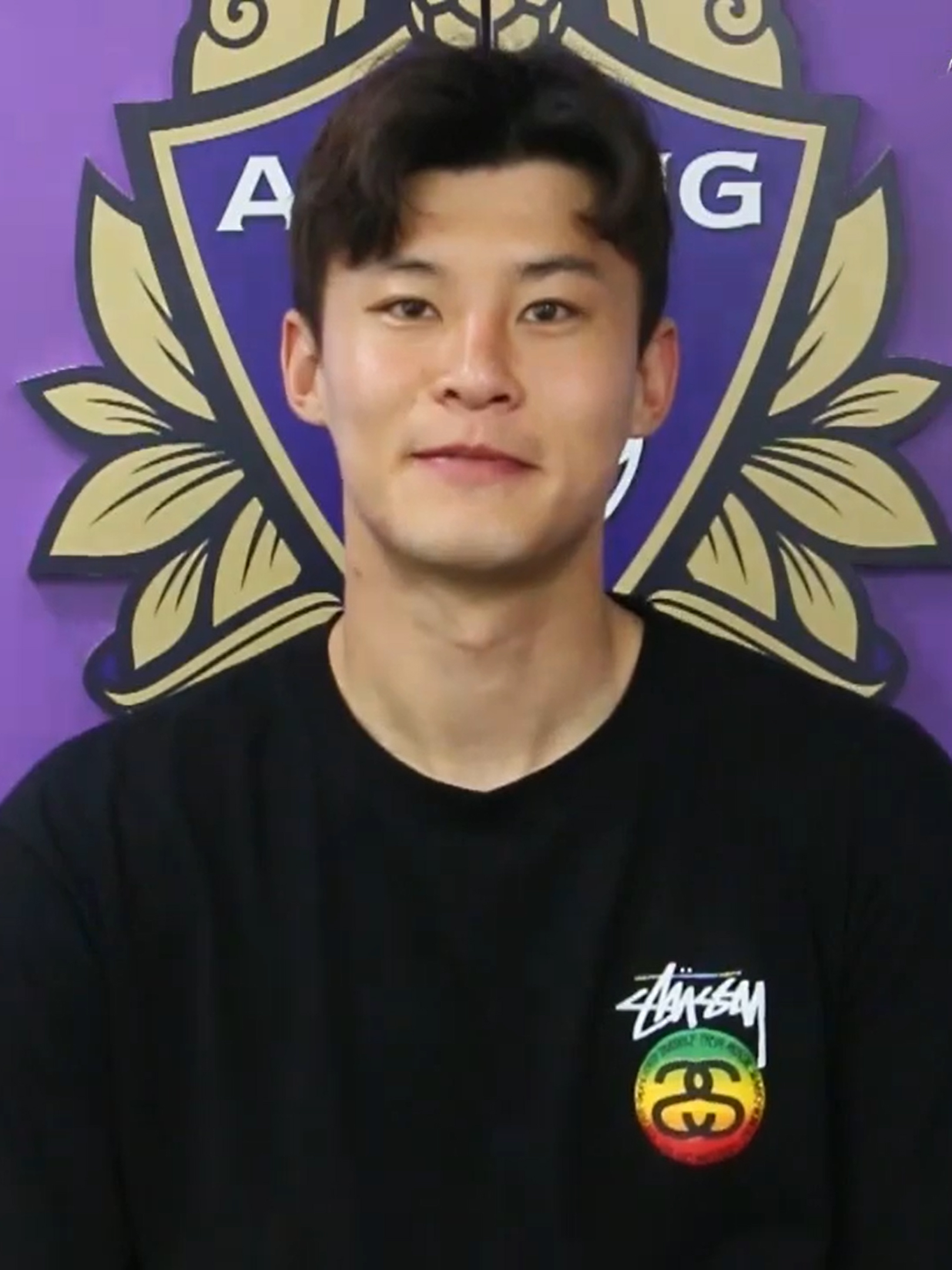
- Choi with FC Anyang in 2019

Personal information
- Date of birth: 20 June 1991 (age 35)
- Place of birth: South Korea
- Height: 1.82 m (5 ft 11 1/2 in)
- Position: Goalkeeper

Team information
- Current team: Gimhae FC
- Number: 91

Youth career
- 2010–2013: Sungkyunkwan University

Senior career*
Years	Team	Apps	(Gls)
2014–2019	FC Anyang	52	(0)
2017–2018	→ Sangju Sangmu (army)	19	(0)
2019–2021	Busan IPark	52	(0)
2022–2024	Seongnam FC	49	(0)
2025	FC Mokpo	2	(0)
2025	Gyeongnam FC	21	(0)
2026–	Gimhae FC	16	(0)
- * Club domestic league appearances and goals as of 8 August 2026

Choi Pil-soo (Korean: 최필수; born 30 April 1991) is a South Korean footballer who plays as goalkeeper for Gimhae FC.

== Career ==
He was selected by FC Anyang in the 2014 K League draft.

On 1 January 2026, Choi Pil-soo was announce official transfer to K League 2 promoted club, Gimhae FC for 2026 season.
