= Jung Ji-soo =

South Korean footballer

Jung Ji-Soo
Personal information
- Full name: Jung Ji-Soo
- Date of birth: May 2, 1990 (age 36)
- Place of birth: South Korea
- Height: 1.75 m (5 ft 9 in)
- Position: Striker

Team information
- Current team: Phitsanulok

Senior career*
| Years | Team | Apps | (Gls) |
| 2009 | Busan I'Park | | |
| 2011 | Yongin City | 1 | (0) |
| 2011–2012 | Atletico Reguengos | 4 | (0) |
| 2013 | Pattaya United | 13 | (4) |
| 2014– | Phitsanulok | | |
- * Club domestic league appearances and goals

Jung Ji-Soo (born May 2, 1990) is a South Korean football player who plays for Phitsanulok in Thai Division 1 League.

His previous club is Busan I'Park in the K-League.
