= Kim Won-min =

South Korean footballer (born 1987)

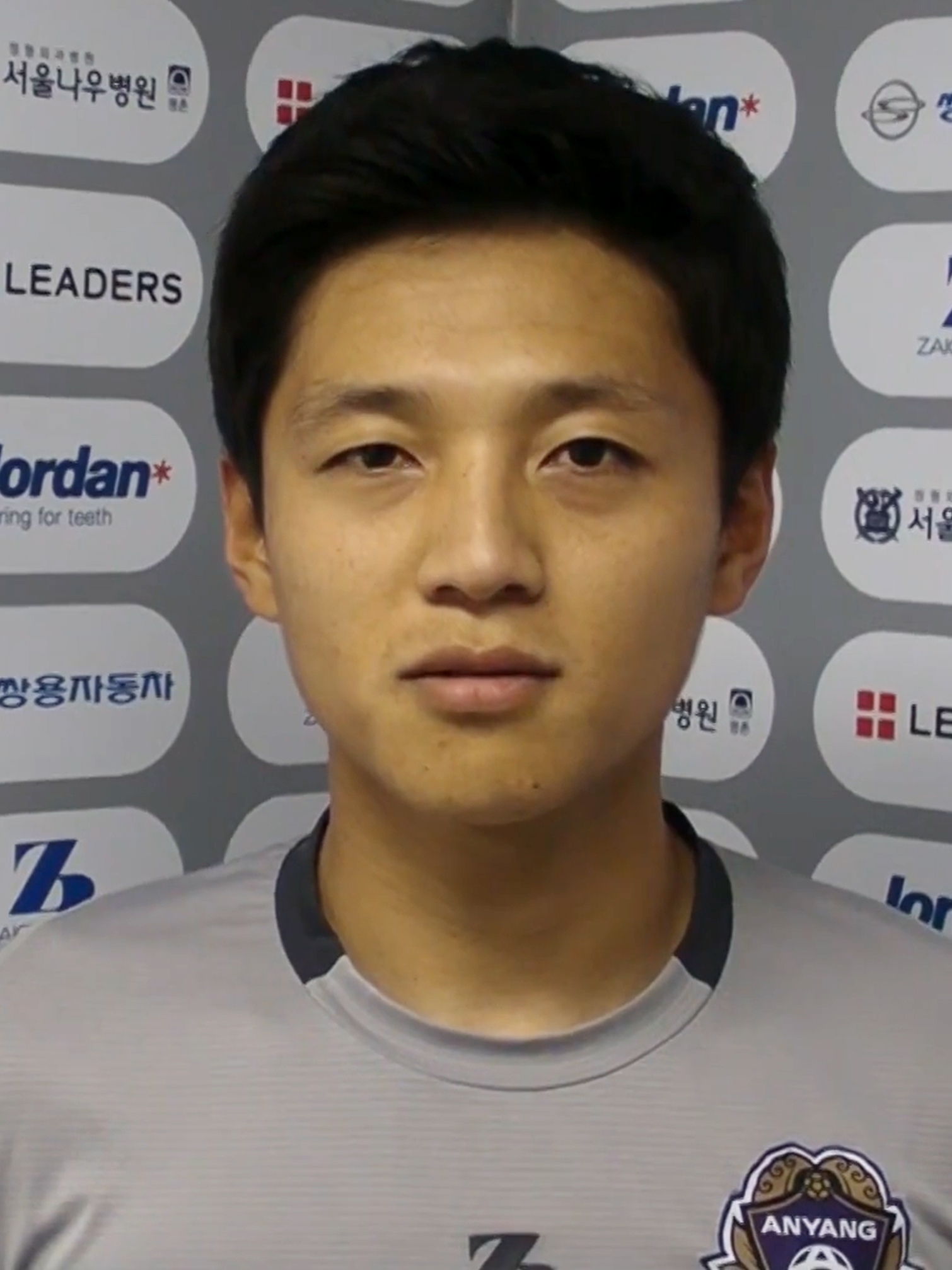
- Kim with FC Anyang in 2018

Personal information
- Full name: Kim Won-min
- Date of birth: 12 August 1987 (age 39)
- Place of birth: South Korea
- Height: 1.75 m (5 ft 9 in)
- Position: Midfielder

Team information
- Current team: FC Anyang
- Number: 77

Youth career
- 2006–2009: Konkuk University

Senior career*
Years	Team	Apps	(Gls)
2011	Gimhae FC	25	(8)
2012	Goyang KB	25	(6)
2013–2014	FC Anyang	54	(6)
2017-2019	FC Anyang	27	(7)
2020	Hwaseong FC	19	(4)
2021-	Mokpo City FC	44	(3)
- * Club domestic league appearances and goals as of 24 October 2022

Kim Won-min (Korean: 김원민; born 12 August 1987) is a South Korean footballer who plays as midfielder for Mokpo City FC in K3 League.

== Career ==
He was selected by FC Anyang in 2013 K League draft.
