= Oh Chul-suk =

South Korean footballer (born 1982)

Oh Chul-Suk
Personal information
- Date of birth: March 23, 1982 (age 44)
- Place of birth: South Korea
- Height: 1.88 m (6 ft 2 in)
- Position: Forward

Youth career
- Yonsei University

Senior career*
Years	Team	Apps	(Gls)
2005–2010	Busan I'Park	26	(1)
2007	→ Busan Transportation Corp. (loan)	22	(8)
2010–2011	Yongin City	47	(9)
2012	Busan Transportation Corp.	0	(0)
- * Club domestic league appearances and goals

Oh Chul-Suk (born March 23, 1982) is a former South Korea football forward.

He played for Busan I'Park in the K-League.
