= Lee Wan-hee =

South Korean footballer

Personal information
- Full name: Lee Wan-hee
- Date of birth: 10 July 1987 (age 39)
- Place of birth: South Korea
- Height: 1.88 m (6 ft 2 in)
- Position: Forward

Team information
- Current team: Chungju Hummel
- Number: 9

Senior career*
Years	Team	Apps	(Gls)
2010–2012	Goyang KB	41	(13)
2013–2014	FC Anyang	14	(1)
2014	→ Chungju Hummel (loan)	17	(3)
2015	Chungju Hummel	1	(0)
- * Club domestic league appearances and goals as of 23 December 2015

Lee Wan-hee (Korean: 이완희; born 10 July 1987) is a South Korean football player who played for the Chungju Hummel in K League Challenge.

== Career ==
Lee joined Goyang KB in 2010.

He was selected by FC Anyang in the 2013 K League draft. He moved to Chungju Hummel on loan after a season in Anyang.
