= Park Sung-jin =

South Korean footballer

Personal information
- Full name: Park Sung-jin
- Date of birth: 28 January 1985 (age 41)
- Place of birth: South Korea
- Height: 1.79 m (5 ft 10 1/2 in)
- Position: Forward

Team information
- Current team: FC Anyang

Youth career
- 2003–2006: Dongguk University

Senior career*
Years	Team	Apps	(Gls)
2007–2012	Goyang KB	108	(27)
2013–	FC Anyang	79	(14)
2015–2016	→ Hwaseong FC (loan)		
- * Club domestic league appearances and goals as of 1 January 2019

Park Sung-jin (Korean: 박성진; born 28 January 1985) is a South Korean footballer who plays as forward for FC Anyang in K League 2.

== Career ==
He signed with National League side Goyang KB in 2007. After his team was dissolved in 2013, Park joined FC Anyang. He was appointed as a captain of the team in 2014.

Park, who played for FC Anyang for six years on 25 May 2019, retired from Anyang Sports Stadiumthrough a retirement ceremony.
