= 2004 K2 League =

Hyundai Motors K2 League
- Season: 2004
- Champions: Goyang Kookmin Bank (2nd title)
- Matches: 92
- Goals: 221 (2.4 per match)
- Best Player: First stage: Kim Yoon-dong; Second stage: Kim Hae-gook; Playoff: Kim Dong-min
- Top goalscorer: Kim Jae-cheon (8 goals)
- Biggest home win: HMD 4–0 Gangneung (28 August 2004)
- Biggest away win: Sangmu 1–5 HMD (30 May 2004)
- Highest scoring: Hummel 3–3 Hallelujah (16 May 2004); HMD 4–2 Hummel (22 May 2004); Sangmu 1–5 HMD (30 May 2004); KHNP 3–3 Suwon (29 August 2004)
- Longest winning run: 8 matches Hyundai Mipo Dockyard
- Longest unbeaten run: 18 matches Hyundai Mipo Dockyard
- Longest winless run: 10 matches Gimpo Hallelujah
- Longest losing run: 6 matches Seosan Citizen

The 2004 K2 League was the second season of the Korea National League, which was at the time the second-highest division of the South Korean football league system. The league was divided into two stages, and the winners of each stage qualified for the championship playoff.

== Regular season ==
=== First stage ===
Pos	Team	Pld	W	D	L	GF	GA	GD	Pts	
1	Goyang Kookmin Bank	9	7	2	0	17	5	+12	23	Qualification for the playoff
2	Hyundai Mipo Dockyard	9	6	3	0	19	7	+12	21	
3	Icheon Sangmu	9	6	1	2	12	9	+3	19	
4	Daejeon KHNP	9	3	3	3	9	9	0	12	
5	Suwon City	9	2	4	3	7	10	−3	10	
6	Gangneung City	9	2	3	4	9	10	−1	9	
7	Incheon Korail	9	2	3	4	6	9	−3	9	
8	Gimpo Hallelujah	9	2	3	4	11	15	−4	9	
9	Seosan Citizen	9	1	2	6	8	14	−6	5	
10	Uijeongbu Hummel Korea	9	1	2	6	12	22	−10	5	

Source: RSSSF

=== Second stage ===
Pos	Team	Pld	W	D	L	GF	GA	GD	Pts	
1	Gangneung City	9	6	2	1	11	8	+3	20	Qualification for the playoff
2	Hyundai Mipo Dockyard	9	5	4	0	19	7	+12	19	
3	Suwon City	9	3	4	2	12	10	+2	13	
4	Goyang Kookmin Bank	9	3	3	3	9	8	+1	12	
5	Incheon Korail	9	1	7	1	10	10	0	10	
6	Icheon Sangmu	9	2	4	3	11	12	−1	10	
7	Uijeongbu Hummel Korea	9	2	4	3	8	9	−1	10	
8	Daejeon KHNP	9	2	3	4	10	15	−5	9	
9	Seosan Citizen	9	2	2	5	9	14	−5	8	
10	Gimpo Hallelujah	9	0	5	4	7	13	−6	5	

Source: RSSSF

== Championship playoff ==
=== Summary ===
Team 1	Agg.	Team 2	1st leg	2nd leg
Gangneung City	1–4	Goyang Kookmin Bank (C)	1–2	0–2

=== Results ===
November 20

Gangneung City	1–2	Goyang Kookmin Bank
Ha Sung-yong 42'		Kim Dong-min 17', 78'

Gangneung Stadium, Gangneung

November 27

Goyang Kookmin Bank	2–0	Gangneung City
Kim Ki-jong 57'; Kim Yoon-dong 84'

Goyang Stadium, Goyang

Goyang Kookmin Bank won 4–1 on aggregate.

== See also ==
- 2004 in South Korean football
- 2004 K2 League Championship
- 2004 Korean FA Cup
