= Choi Byung-do =

South Korean footballer (born 1984)

Personal information
- Date of birth: 18 January 1984 (age 42)
- Place of birth: South Korea
- Height: 1.84 m (6 ft 0 in)
- Position: Defender

Youth career
- 2002–2005: Kyonggi University

Senior career*
Years	Team	Apps	(Gls)
2006–2010	Incheon United	5	(0)
2008–2009	→ Gwangju Sangmu (army)	11	(0)
2011–2012	Ulsan Hyundai Mipo Dockyard	38	(2)
2013–2014	Goyang Hi FC	64	(2)
2015–2016	Bucheon FC 1995	33	(0)
2017	Seoul E-Land	2	(0)
- * Club domestic league appearances and goals as of 1 January 2018

Choi Byung-do (Korean: 최병도; born 18 January 1984) is a South Korean football defender.

== Career statistics ==
As of 22 October 2009

Club performance			League		Cup		League Cup		Continental		Total	
Season	Club	League	Apps	Goals	Apps	Goals	Apps	Goals	Apps	Goals	Apps	Goals
South Korea			League		KFA Cup		League Cup		Asia		Total	
2006	Incheon United	K League	3	0	1	0	6	0	–		10	0
2007	Incheon United	K League	2	0	1	0	7	0	–		10	0
2008	Gwangju Sangmu	K League	11	0	1	0	5	0	–		17	0
2009	Gwangju Sangmu	K League	0	0	0	0	1	0	–		1	0
2010	Incheon United	K League	2	0	0	0	0	0	–		2	0
Total	Incheon United		7	0	2	0	13	0	–		22	0
Total	Gwangju Sangmu		11	0	1	0	6	0	–		18	0
Career total			18	0	3	0	19	0	–		40	0
