= Yongin City FC =

2010–2016 South Korean football club

Yongin FC
- Full name: Yongin City Government Football Club 용인 시청 축구단
- Short name: YIC
- Founded: 2010; 16 years ago
- Dissolved: 2016; 10 years ago
- Ground: Yongin Football Center
- Capacity: 1,200
Home colours	Away colours

Yongin Football Club (Korean: 용인 FC) was a South Korean association football club based in Yongin, Gyeonggi. Founded in 2010, they played in the National League, the third tier of South Korean league football. They played their home games at the Yongin Football Center.

== History ==
Founded on January 1, 2010, Yongin City FC gained membership of the National League ahead of the 2010 season with the league expanding to fifteen sides. Former Pusan Daewoo Royals and South Korean international defender Jung Kwang-seok was appointed the club's inaugural manager.

=== Debut season ===
The club's debut match was a Second Round tie in the 2010 Korean FA Cup however they suffered a home defeat to Kwangwoon University, losing out 7–6 on penalties after the tie had finished 1–1 after extra time. Yongin City made a solid start to life in the National League in 2010, then the unofficial second tier of football in Korea, finishing with the sixth-best overall record of all clubs in the division for 2010. Jung Ji-soo and Oh Chul-suk finished joint-top scorers for the club with six goals each during the campaign.

=== Professional encounter ===
Yongin endured a difficult second season during 2011 as they finished eleventh out of the fourteen teams that took part in the competition that year. That season's FA Cup competition saw them come up against professional K-League opposition for the first time when they were drawn to face FC Seoul at the Seoul World Cup Stadium. Yongin lost the match 4–0.

=== 2012 National League playoff run ===
2012 proved to be Yongin's best ever league campaign to date as they finished the 26-game league campaign in sixth place and qualified for the post-season championship playoffs. In their first match they were drawn to play third-placed Gangneung City and Yongin triumphed 4–2 on penalties after the game finished goalless. That victory set up an encounter with Incheon Korail however Yongin were defeated 3–1 by the team that would go on to win in the championship playoff final. Despite a solid league campaign Yongin exited the 2012 FA Cup at the first hurdle yet again as their Second Round encounter with National Police FC ended in a 4–0 home reverse. There was to be some success for the squad at the National Sports Festival football tournament in October that year as they finished joint-third with Gimhae FC and were awarded the bronze medal having been eliminated at the semi-final stage 10–9 on penalties by Gangneung City.

=== First FA Cup tie win ===
The club failed to build on the relative success of 2012 as they finished second-bottom of the much reduced-in-size 2013 National League season, the league having effectively been reduced in status to the unofficial third tier of football in Korea following the creation of the K League Challenge. Although Yongin finished ninth out of the ten sides they were just five points adrift of fourth place and the final championship playoff spot. The club recorded their first ever win in FA Cup competition during the 2013 edition of the tournament with a 1–0 win over Kyunghee University in the Second Round. That victory set up a Third Round clash with K League Classic side Jeonbuk Hyundai Motors however Jeonbuk won 2–0.

=== Struggling in 2014 ===
Yongin endured a tough 2014 National League season where they recorded just four wins in the 27 match season and ended up bottom of the league, seven points adrift of second-bottom Gimhae FC. There was to be no respite in any of the cup competitions either, with early exits from the National Sports Festival and the Korea National League Championship along with a 3–2 defeat to Gangwon FC in the Second Round of the 2014 Korean FA Cup.

=== Dissolution ===
Yongin City FC was dissolved in 2016. Ten years later, the city founded the fully professional Yongin FC, which competes in K League 2.

== Managers ==
#	Name	From	To	Season	Notes
1	(South Korea) Jeong Kwang-seok	2010/01/01	2014/11/20	2010–2014	First manager
2	(South Korea) Kim Jong-pil	2014/11/21			

== Honours ==
=== Domestic competitions ===
==== Cups ====
- National Sports Festival

(bronze) Bronze Medal (1): 2012

== Statistics ==
Season	Korea National League											Korean FA Cup	League Cup	Top scorer (League goals)	Manager
Season	Stage	Teams	P	W	D	L	GF	GA	GD	Pts	Position	Korean FA Cup	League Cup	Top scorer (League goals)	Manager
2010	First stage	15	14	6	5	3	24	17	7	23	5th	Round of 32	Quarterfinal	(South Korea) Oh Chul-suk (6) (South Korea) Jung Ji-soo (6)	(South Korea) Jeong Kwang-seok
2010	Second stage	15	14	6	4	4	17	12	5	22	7th	Round of 32	Quarterfinal	(South Korea) Oh Chul-suk (6) (South Korea) Jung Ji-soo (6)	(South Korea) Jeong Kwang-seok
2011	—	14	26	5	11	10	22	32	–10	26	11th	Round of 32	Quarterfinal	(South Korea) Seo Young-duk (4)	(South Korea) Jeong Kwang-seok
2012	—	14	26	12	6	8	39	30	+9	42	6th	Preliminary	Quarterfinal	(South Korea) Ko Kyung-min (12)	(South Korea) Jeong Kwang-seok
2012	Playoff	6	2	0	1	1	1	3	–2	1	4th	Preliminary	Quarterfinal	(South Korea) Ko Kyung-min (12)	(South Korea) Jeong Kwang-seok
2013	—	10	27	8	8	11	37	38	–1	32	9th	Round of 32	Group stage	(South Korea) Jo Joon-jae (7)	(South Korea) Jeong Kwang-seok
2014	—	10	27	4	7	16	30	45	–15	19	10th	Round of 64	Group stage	(South Korea) Park Jeong-min (9)	(South Korea) Jeong Kwang-seok

== Crest ==
2010–2014

2015–2016
