= Ho-Young Kim =

Mechanical engineer and an academic

- Occupations: Mechanical engineer and academic

Academic background
- Education: BS., Mechanical Engineering, Seoul National University; SM., Mechanical Engineering, MIT; PhD., Mechanical Engineering, MIT
- Alma mater: Seoul National University; Massachusetts Institute of Technology

Ho-Young Kim is a mechanical engineer and an academic. He is a Professor and chair in the Department of Mechanical Engineering at Seoul National University.

Kim's research interests encompass fluid mechanics, biofluid dynamics, microfluidics, soft matter, and their applications in bio-inspired soft mechanics, biomimetic soft robotics, nanofluidics, and renewable energy. Among numerous awards, he is the recipient of SNU President's Research Excellence Award, Gasan Award for Research Excellence and the Namheon Award for Research Excellence from the Korean Society of Mechanical Engineers.

Kim is a Fellow of the American Physical Society. He has served as an Associate Editor for Droplet.

== Education ==
Kim obtained his B.S. in Mechanical Engineering from Seoul National University in 1994. In 1996, he pursued an S.M. (Master of Science) in Mechanical Engineering at the Massachusetts Institute of Technology (MIT) in Cambridge and earned his Ph.D. in Mechanical Engineering from MIT in 1999.

== Career ==
Kim began his career as a Senior Research Scientist as Military Service at the Korea Institute of Science and Technology from 1999 to 2004. During the military stint, he held positions as a Visiting Scholar at the Laboratory for Manufacturing and Productivity at the Massachusetts Institute of Technology (MIT) in 2001 and a Visiting Scientist at the University of Cambridge, in 2002. In 2004, he worked as a Postdoctoral Fellow in the Division of Engineering and Applied Sciences at Harvard University. He then joined Seoul University as an assistant professor in the same year and has held the position of Professor in the Department of Mechanical Engineering at the Seoul National University since 2014.

Kim has held numerous professional appointments, including Track Chair for the World Congress on Biomechanics 2022 and co-chair for the International Conference on Nature Inspired Surface Engineering 2020, and organizer for the IUTAM Symposium on Capillarity and Elastocapillarity in Biology 2024.

== Research ==
Kim's research has focused on biofluid mechanics, capillarity, bubbles, nanofabrication, and soft matter, and has integrated experimental and theoretical approaches.

=== Biofluid mechanics ===
Motivated by the ability of water striders to jump off water surface without sinking, Kim studied how super-water-repellent solids can be disengaged from water. He showed that a tiny superhydrophobic sphere can bounce off water surface when it impacts onto water with speeds of a narrow range. By studying the force and energy required to lift a solid object clear from the water surface, he found that a drastic degree of energy saving (up to 99%) is achieved when lifting a superhydrophobic object as compared with an object with moderate wettability. He also obtained the load supported by small floating objects as a function of the contact angle, and the sinking speeds of small but heavy solids into either inviscid or viscous liquids. These hydrodynamic studies eventually allowed him to capture the essential physics behind water jumping of water striders and to build a robotic water strider. He has extended his interests to the jumps of terrestrial insects, and solved the motion of a simple jumper (elastic hoop) to predict its maximum jump height accurately. In addition to the locomotion of semi-aquatic arthropods, he studied thrust generation of flapping appendages of swimming robots and animals. He found a kinematic condition of a compliant, beating fin for maximizing the thrust of a robotic fish. He also found that flapping paddles, tails, and fins of ducks, standing dolphins, and starting fish generate thrust by forming a vortical structure different from a conventional starting-stopping vortex paradigm, which allowed him to construct a scaling law to predict the thrust of the flapping plate in the absence of a free stream velocity. He also obtained a universal scaling law for the lift of hovering insects through simple scaling arguments of the strength of the leading edge vortex and the momentum induced by the vortical structure. In addition, his collaborative work used a fluttering flag to devise a novel scheme to generate electric power based on triboelectrification.

=== Capillarity ===
Upon the basis of the pioneering theory of elastocapillarity, Kim continued to investigate the bending of thin elastic objects due to interfacial forces as they touch the liquid-fluid interface. He formulated the elastic deformation of elastic sheets under the line force of surface tension and the loading due to hydrostatic and Laplace pressures, and solved the free-boundary problem as the location of the meniscus is a part of the solution. The problems that he investigated include a two-dimensional paintbrush, a bubble-actuated paddle, and a floating flexible leg. He investigated the clustering behavior of micropillars and lamellae as a liquid film evaporates and pulls the solid structures together due to surface tension effects. He has also expanded this research to hygroscopic poroelastic structures, like paper, that deform with impregnation of water.

The development of micro- and nanofabrication technology has enabled the formation of microscopically rough surfaces with tailored topography. Such surface textures magnify either wettability or water-repellency of smooth surfaces, which used to be impossible. He investigated the dynamics of liquid drops deposited on superhydrophilic textured surfaces to find that the spreading dynamics are qualitatively different from those on smooth surfaces and obtained the various scaling laws that govern the hemiwicking dynamics. Noting that writing with ink involves the similar process of superwetting of rough surfaces (paper) from a moving source (pen), he mathematically analyzed the process of writing. He also showed the effectiveness of superhydrophilic surfaces in collecting water from humid air via dewing, and modeled the shape of large drops on superhydrophobic surfaces.

Using the micro- and nanofabrication technology, he also generated surfaces with super- wettability-contrast, such that superhydrophobic areas are surrounded by superhydrophilic area or vice versa. Liquid drops impacting on the micro-wetting patterned surfaces exhibit novel and even aesthetically pleasing dynamic behaviors, leading to the formation of various deposit morphologies such as radiating liquid spokes and liquid rings.

=== Bubbles ===
Focusing on the mechanism of ultrasonic cleaning, Kim showed through a high-speed visualization technique and verified theoretically that it is the pressure gradient locally generated by rapid bubble oscillations that removes particles on solid surfaces. Based on the understanding of the role of ultrasonic bubbles in cleaning and damaging of solid surfaces, he devised a scheme of ultrasonic cleaning that can preserve fragile nanostructures on semiconductor chips while removing contaminant particles. He identified the physical origins of micropattern damage caused by violently oscillating cavitation bubbles. In addition to ultrasonic cavitation bubbles, he studied dynamic behavior of relatively slow thermal bubbles, which have implications on microbubble-based MEMS devices as well as boiling heat transfer. Both fluid-dynamic and thermal measurements were carried out for a bubble that forms, grows and departs from a continuously powered microline heater, a tool to investigate the microbubble behavior with high temporal and spatial resolutions. He also demonstrated that bubbles consecutively formed by a continuously powered microheater and deflecting an adjacent cantilever beam can be used as an actuator in liquid environments.

=== Nanofabrication ===
Kim developed a surface modification technology that forms nanoscale roughness and lowers the surface energy on large areas at a low cost using plasma assisted chemical vapor deposition (PACVD) technique with a group of materials scientists. The collaboration led to a variety of functional surfaces including the surfaces with strong and robust superhydrophobicity, with long-lasting superhydrophilicity, with tunable absorbability, and an array of tilted pillars resembling the footpad of a gecko lizard. He extended this technique to superhydrophobize cylindrical porous tubes in order to improve the efficiency of a desalination process called membrane distillation.

To overcome the inherent drawbacks of most nanofabrication technologies that modify or pattern two-dimensional surfaces, either planar (conventional technology) or curved (the aforementioned plasma-based technology), he developed a technology to build three-dimensional nanoscale objects by direct deposition of nanofibers. He showed that a nanoscale polymer solution electrojet can coil to form free-standing hollow pottery as the jet is focused onto a sharp electrode tip. He also fabricated free-standing walls using electrojets, which can be a fundamental technology to enable nanoscale three-dimensional printing.

=== Soft matter ===
Kim has worked on mechanical analysis, optimal design, and low-cost fabrication of soft-matter-based machines, which can shape-morph and locomote just as soft natural organisms. He has been particularly interested in hygroscopically responsive materials, which can swell by absorbing water. He reported a self-locomotive ratcheted actuator powered by environmental humidity, called hygrobot. He suggested a way to understand such system from the perspective of thermodynamic cycle analysis. Mechanical study of hygroscopic swelling of porous materials led to the birth of a new scientific branch of poroelastocapillarity, for which he wrote an authoritative review. He is also working on stimuli-responsive granular materials and growing soft systems structurally embedded with physical intelligence.

== Awards and honors ==
- 2014 – Shinyang Young Investigator Award, SNU College of Engineering
- 2014 – Gasan Award for Research Excellence, Korean Society of Mechanical Engineers
- 2017 – Fellow, American Physical Society
- 2018 – Namheon Award for Research Excellence, Korean Society of Mechanical Engineers
- 2022 – SNU President's Award for Research Excellence
