= Danilo Teixeira =

Brazilian footballer (born 1983)

Personal information
- Full name: Danilo Martins Teixeira
- Date of birth: December 2, 1983 (age 42)
- Place of birth: São Paulo, Brazil
- Height: 6 ft 0 in (1.83 m)
- Position: Forward

Team information
- Current team: Joseense
- Number: 11

Youth career
- –2008: Santos

Senior career*
Years	Team	Apps	(Gls)
2006	→ CA Juventus (loan)	0	(0)
2006–2007	→ São José (loan)	9	(0)
2008	→ Uberaba (loan)	?	(?)
2008	→ Itumbiara (loan)	?	(?)
2009	Cabofriense	1	(0)
2009	Ferroviária	?	(?)
2010	Miami FC	10	(4)
2011	Ulsan Mipo Dockyard	16	(10)
2012–2013	Al-Oruba	4	(2)
2013	Avenida	0	(0)
2013	Llaneros	11	(1)
2014–	Joseense	9	(5)
- * Club domestic league appearances and goals as of 14 October 2013

Danilo Martins Teixeira (born December 2, 1983) is a Brazilian footballer who currently plays for the Colombian club Llaneros F.C.

== Career ==
=== Brazil ===
Teixeira was part of the youth squad at the famed Brazilian team Santos, Uberaba Sport Clube and Clube Atlético Juventus. He subsequently played for both Itumbiara and Cabofriense. He was the leading goalscorer in the Campeonato Paulista Série A2 in 2009 playing for Ferroviária.

=== United States ===
Teixeira signed Miami FC in the USSF Division 2 Professional League in 2010, as a result of his professional relationship with Traffic Sports, which owns the American club. He made his debut for the team on August 7, 2010 in a 1–1 tie with the Puerto Rico Islanders.

=== South Korea ===
In 2011, Teixeira has signed for Ulsan Hyundai Mipo Dockyard in the National League, the second division of South Korean football league system. He became the league top goalscorer in the season with 10 goals.

Awards
Preceded by (South Korea) Kim Young-Nam	Korea National League Top Scorer; 2011	Succeeded by Incumbent
