= Sung Ho-yeung =

South Korean footballer (born 1999)

Personal information
- Date of birth: 8 January 1999 (age 27)
- Place of birth: South Korea
- Height: 1.73 m (5 ft 8 in)
- Position: Winger

Team information
- Current team: Gimhae FC
- Number: 23

Youth career
- 2014–2016: Gaesung High School
- 2017–2019: Yeungnam University

Senior career*
Years	Team	Apps	(Gls)
2020–2024	Busan IPark	66	(5)
2025	Gyeongju Korea Hydro & Nuclear Power FC	28	(1)
2026–	Gimhae FC	9	(1)
- * Club domestic league appearances and goals as of 10 August 2026

Sung Ho-yeung (Korean: 성호영; born 8 January 1999) is a South Korean footballer currently playing as a winger for Gimhae FC.

== Career statistics ==
=== Club ===
As of 10 August 2026.

Club	Season	League			Cup		Play-offs		Total	
Club	Season	Division	Apps	Goals	Apps	Goals	Apps	Goals	Apps	Goals
Busan IPark	2020	K League 2	0	0	2	0	0	0	2	0
Busan IPark	2021	K League 2	8	0	1	0	0	0	9	0
Busan IPark	2022	K League 2	12	1	0	0	0	0	12	1
Busan IPark	2023	K League 2	21	3	0	0	2	0	23	3
Busan IPark	2024	K League 2	25	1	1	0	0	0	26	1
Busan IPark	Club total		66	5	4	0	2	0	72	5
Gyeongju Korea Hydro & Nuclear Power FC	2025	K League 3	28	1	2	0	0	0	30	1
Gimhae FC	2026	K League 2	9	1	2	0	0	0	11	1
Career total			103	5	8	0	2	0	113	7
