= Lee Woo-hyung =

South Korean footballer and manager

Personal information
- Full name: Lee Woo-hyung
- Date of birth: 2 February 1966 (age 60)
- Place of birth: South Korea
- Height: 1.80 m (5 ft 11 in)
- Position: Midfielder

Youth career
- Dong-a University

Senior career*
Years	Team	Apps	(Gls)
1989–1997	Kookmin Bank		

Managerial career
- 2000–2012: Goyang KB
- 2013–2015: FC Anyang
- 2016–2018: Shenyang Dongjin
- 2021–: FC Anyang
- * Club domestic league appearances and goals

Lee Woo-hyung (Korean: 이우형; born 2 February 1966) is a South Korean football manager and former footballer who played as midfielder.

== Career ==
=== Playing career ===
He played for Kookmin Bank Football Club and retired with a dissolution of the team in 1997.

=== Managerial career ===
Lee was appointed as a coach of Goyang KB in 2000 and promoted to a manager in 2004.

He started for his new post as a manager of FC Anyang in 2013.
