= Yesan FC =

2002–2011 South Korean football club

Yesan FC 예산 FC
- Full name: Yesan Football Club 예산 축구단
- Founded: 2002
- Dissolved: 2011
- Ground: Yesan Stadium
- Chairman: (South Korea) Son Doo-sung
- Manager: (South Korea) Choi Jong-deok
- 2010 Season: 15th
Home colours	Away colours

Yesan Football Club (Korean: 예산FC; Hanja: 禮山FC) is a South Korean soccer club based in Yesan county.

Yesan FC played in the Korea National League. The team was founded as Seosan Citizen in Seosan in 2002, and competed as Seosan Omega in the 2007 league season prior to the relocation to Yesan ahead of the 2008 season.

In 2011, the team decided to withdraw from the league due to budgetary problems.

== Name history ==
- 2002: Founded as Seosan Citizen
- 2007: Renamed Seosan Omega
- 2008: Renamed Yesan FC

== Statistics ==
Season	Korea National League											Korean FA Cup	League Cup	Top scorer (League goals)	Manager
Season	Stage	Teams	P	W	D	L	GF	GA	GD	Pts	Position	Korean FA Cup	League Cup	Top scorer (League goals)	Manager
2003	First stage	10	9	3	2	4	14	15	−1	11	7th	Round 1	None	(South Korea) Yoon Chang-soo (10)	(South Korea) Choi Jong-deok
2003	Second stage	10	9	2	5	2	10	14	−4	11	7th	Round 1	None	(South Korea) Yoon Chang-soo (10)	(South Korea) Choi Jong-deok
2004	First Stage	10	9	1	2	6	8	14	−6	5	9th	Did not qualify	Group Round	(South Korea) 3 players (3)	(South Korea) Choi Jong-deok
2004	Second stage	10	9	2	2	5	9	14	−5	8	9th	Did not qualify	Group Round	(South Korea) 3 players (3)	(South Korea) Choi Jong-deok
2005	First stage	11	10	1	0	9	4	19	−15	3	11th	Did not qualify	Group Round	(South Korea) 4 players (2)	(South Korea) Choi Jong-deok
2005	Second Stage	11	10	1	6	3	8	15	−7	9	10th	Did not qualify	Group Round	(South Korea) 4 players (2)	(South Korea) Choi Jong-deok
2006	First stage	11	10	2	3	5	7	14	−7	9	8th	Round 1	Group Round	(South Korea) Kim Young-jong (2)	(South Korea) Choi Jong-deok
2006	Second stage	11	10	0	2	8	6	20	−14	2	11th	Round 1	Group Round	(South Korea) Kim Young-jong (2)	(South Korea) Choi Jong-deok
2007	First stage	12	11	2	2	7	11	21	−10	8	10th	Round 1	Quarterfinal	(South Korea) Park Min-keun (5)	(South Korea) Choi Jong-deok
2007	Second stage	12	11	1	2	8	13	27	−14	5	11th	Round 1	Quarterfinal	(South Korea) Park Min-keun (5)	(South Korea) Choi Jong-deok
2008	First stage	14	13	1	4	8	11	24	−13	7	13th	Round 1	Group Round	(South Korea) 3 players (4)	(South Korea) Choi Jong-deok
2008	Second stage	14	13	0	4	9	13	34	−21	4	14th	Round 1	Group Round	(South Korea) 3 players (4)	(South Korea) Choi Jong-deok
2009	First stage	14	13	3	4	6	13	25	−12	13	12th	Round 1	Group Round	(South Korea) Kang Sung-bok (5)	(South Korea) Choi Jong-deok
2009	Second stage	13	12	0	1	11	11	38	−27	1	13th	Round 1	Group Round	(South Korea) Kang Sung-bok (5)	(South Korea) Choi Jong-deok
2010	First stage	15	14	3	1	10	21	38	−17	10	14th	Round 2	Group Round	(South Korea) Son Je-woong (8)	(South Korea) Choi Jong-deok
2010	Second stage	15	14	0	0	14	14	59	−45	0	15th	Round 2	Group Round	(South Korea) Son Je-woong (8)	(South Korea) Choi Jong-deok
