= Song Won-jae =

South Korean footballer (born 1989)

Personal information
- Full name: Song Won-jae
- Date of birth: 21 February 1989 (age 37)
- Place of birth: South Korea
- Height: 1.75 m (5 ft 9 in)
- Position: Defender

Team information
- Current team: Bucheon FC 1995
- Number: 8

Youth career
- 2007–2010: Korea University

Senior career*
| Years | Team | Apps | (Gls) |
| 2011 | Ulsan Hyundai | 0 | (0) |
| 2011–2012 | Ulsan Hyundai Mipo | 22 | (1) |
| 2013– | Bucheon FC | 62 | (0) |
| 2013–2014 | → Sangju Sangmu (military duty) | 15 | (0) |
- * Club domestic league appearances and goals as of 1 November 2016

Song Won-jae (Korean: 송원재; born 21 February 1989) is a South Korean footballer who plays as defender for Bucheon FC in K League Challenge.

== Career ==
Song was selected by Ulsan Hyundai in the 2011 K League draft but he didn't have a debut match in his first club. He moved to Ulsan Hyundai Mipo in middle of 2011.

He returned to professional league with signing with Bucheon FC.

Song joined Sangju Sangmu in 2013 to start his military duty.
