= 2010 Korea National League =

Daehan Life Korea National League
- Season: 2010
- Dates: 26 March – 12 November 2010
- Champions: Suwon City (1st title)
- Matches: 210
- Goals: 574 (2.73 per match)
- Best Player: Lee Soo-kil
- Top goalscorer: Kim Young-nam (18 goals)

The 2010 Korea National League, also known as Daehan Life Korea National League 2010, was the eighth season of the Korea National League. It was divided into two stages, and the top two clubs of the overall table qualified for the championship playoffs in addition to the winners of each stage. The league began on 26 March, and ended with the final on 19 November. Foreign players became eligible to participate starting from this season. Each club was allowed to have three foreign players on its roster and two foreign players in its line up.

== Teams ==
Locations of the 2010 Korea National League teams

=== Foreign players ===
Club	Player 1	Player 2	Player 3
Ansan Hallelujah			
Busan Transportation Corporation			
Changwon City			
Cheonan City			
Chungju Hummel			
Daejeon KHNP			
Gangneung City			
Goyang KB Kookmin Bank			
Gimhae City			
Hyundai Mipo Dockyard	(Brazil) Marcos Vinicius	(Brazil) Wesley Alex	
Incheon Korail			
Mokpo City			
Suwon City	(Brazil) Naldinho		
Yesan FC			
Yongin City			

== Regular season ==
=== First stage ===
Pos	Team	Pld	W	D	L	GF	GA	GD	Pts	Qualification
1	Daejeon KHNP	14	8	4	2	28	19	+9	28	Qualification for the playoffs
2	Busan Transportation Corporation	14	8	3	3	23	13	+10	27	
3	Incheon Korail	14	7	5	2	23	17	+6	26	
4	Goyang KB Kookmin Bank	14	7	3	4	19	12	+7	24	
5	Yongin City	14	6	5	3	24	17	+7	23	
6	Changwon City	14	6	3	5	19	14	+5	21	
7	Cheonan City	14	6	3	5	21	17	+4	21	
8	Gangneung City	14	6	3	5	19	19	0	21	
9	Hyundai Mipo Dockyard	14	5	5	4	18	14	+4	20	
10	Suwon City	14	5	4	5	14	14	0	19	
11	Gimhae City	14	5	3	6	12	17	−5	18	
12	Chungju Hummel	14	4	2	8	23	29	−6	14	
13	Ansan Hallelujah	14	3	1	10	14	26	−12	10	
14	Yesan FC	14	3	1	10	21	38	−17	10	
15	Mokpo City	14	1	5	8	8	20	−12	8	

Source: Korea National League (in Korean)
Rules for classification: 1) Points; 2) Goal difference; 3) Goals scored

=== Second stage ===
Pos	Team	Pld	W	D	L	GF	GA	GD	Pts	Qualification
1	Gangneung City	14	9	3	2	28	14	+14	30	Qualification for the playoffs
2	Suwon City	14	8	6	0	18	8	+10	30	
3	Chungju Hummel	14	9	0	5	25	24	+1	27	
4	Cheonan City	14	8	2	4	23	13	+10	26	
5	Goyang KB Kookmin Bank	14	7	4	3	20	15	+5	25	
6	Hyundai Mipo Dockyard	14	7	3	4	22	10	+12	24	
7	Yongin City	14	6	4	4	17	12	+5	22	
8	Busan Transportation Corporation	14	5	5	4	22	18	+4	20	
9	Changwon City	14	5	4	5	18	15	+3	19	
10	Ansan Hallelujah	14	6	0	8	21	22	−1	18	
11	Gimhae City	14	5	3	6	17	19	−2	18	
12	Mokpo City	14	3	3	8	13	18	−5	12	
13	Incheon Korail	14	2	5	7	17	21	−4	11	
14	Daejeon KHNP	14	3	2	9	17	24	−7	11	
15	Yesan FC	14	0	0	14	14	59	−45	0	

Source: Korea National League (in Korean)
Rules for classification: 1) Points; 2) Goal difference; 3) Goals scored

=== Overall table ===
Pos	Team	Pld	W	D	L	GF	GA	GD	Pts	Qualification
1	Gangneung City	28	15	6	7	47	33	+14	51	Second stage winners
2	Goyang KB Kookmin Bank	28	14	7	7	39	27	+12	49	Qualification for the playoffs
3	Suwon City	28	13	10	5	32	22	+10	49	Qualification for the playoffs
4	Busan Transportation Corporation	28	13	8	7	45	31	+14	47	
5	Cheonan City	28	14	5	9	44	30	+14	47	
6	Yongin City	28	12	9	7	41	29	+12	45	
7	Hyundai Mipo Dockyard	28	12	8	8	40	24	+16	44	
8	Chungju Hummel	28	13	2	13	48	53	−5	41	
9	Changwon City	28	11	7	10	37	29	+8	40	
10	Daejeon KHNP	28	11	6	11	45	43	+2	39	First stage winners
11	Incheon Korail	28	9	10	9	40	38	+2	37	
12	Gimhae City	28	10	6	12	29	36	−7	36	
13	Ansan Hallelujah	28	9	1	18	35	48	−13	28	
14	Mokpo City	28	4	8	16	21	38	−17	20	
15	Yesan FC	28	3	1	24	35	97	−62	10	

Source: Korea National League (in Korean)
Rules for classification: 1) Points; 2) Goal difference; 3) Goals scored

=== Result ===
Home \ Away	ASH	BTC	CWC	CAC	CJH	DHN	GNC	GHC	GKB	HMD	ICK	MPC	SWC	YES	YIC
Ansan Hallelujah	—	1–2	1–2	1–2	0–2	2–3	4–2	2–0	1–2	0–2	2–1	1–0	1–0	3–1	0–1
Busan Transportation Corporation	2–1	—	0–1	1–0	5–1	1–0	1–2	2–1	1–0	1–0	2–2	1–0	2–2	2–0	2–2
Changwon City	1–2	1–1	—	2–0	5–3	1–2	0–0	0–0	0–0	1–0	1–1	2–0	1–2	2–0	0–0
Cheonan City	4–0	1–0	1–1	—	4–1	0–1	0–1	2–1	1–1	2–1	2–2	0–0	0–2	5–1	3–1
Chungju Hummel	1–1	3–2	3–2	2–2	—	1–0	0–3	3–0	3–1	0–1	3–1	3–1	0–1	3–2	3–2
Daejeon KHNP	3–4	0–4	3–2	1–3	2–0	—	4–2	2–0	1–2	1–0	1–2	1–1	2–1	3–3	1–1
Gangneung City	2–0	2–2	2–1	1–3	2–1	2–1	—	2–0	2–1	3–1	2–3	2–0	1–1	2–3	1–1
Gimhae City	1–0	0–0	1–0	1–2	4–1	2–1	0–1	—	1–1	3–2	4–2	1–1	0–0	3–2	1–0
Goyang KB Kookmin Bank	2–0	2–0	2–1	1–0	2–1	1–2	0–2	1–2	—	0–0	1–1	2–0	1–1	5–3	2–0
Hyundai Mipo Dockyard	3–2	1–1	1–0	1–0	2–3	3–3	2–0	3–0	0–0	—	0–0	0–0	0–0	8–0	1–0
Incheon Korail	3–1	1–3	0–1	1–2	2–1	0–0	1–0	1–0	0–1	1–1	—	1–2	2–1	2–0	2–3
Mokpo City	1–0	0–2	0–1	0–2	0–1	1–1	2–3	0–0	0–2	1–3	2–2	—	0–0	4–1	2–0
Suwon City	1–0	2–1	0–1	1–0	2–1	2–1	0–0	1–0	2–4	1–0	0–0	1–0	—	2–1	1–1
Yesan FC	1–4	3–2	1–5	2–3	3–4	0–5	1–5	1–2	0–2	1–3	1–5	3–2	1–4	—	0–2
Yongin City	3–1	2–2	3–2	2–0	1–0	2–0	0–0	3–1	2–0	0–1	1–1	2–1	1–1	5–0	—

Source: Korea National League
Legend: Blue = home team win; Yellow = draw; Red = away team win.

== Championship playoffs ==
=== Bracket ===
Semi-finals
Daejeon KHNP	2
Goyang KB Kookmin Bank	1
Gangneung City	1
Suwon City	3

Final
Daejeon KHNP	0	1	1
Suwon City	2	0	2

=== Semi-finals ===
12 November 2010
19:00 KST

Daejeon KHNP	2–1	Goyang KB Kookmin Bank
Lee Sung-woon 24'; Kim Yoon-sik 66'		Lee Sung-min 8'

Daejeon Hanbat Stadium, Daejeon

12 November 2010
19:00 KST

Gangneung City	1–3	Suwon City
Lee Sung-min 82'		Park Jong-chan 45+2', 59', 90+4'

Gangneung Stadium, Gangneung

=== Final ===
16 November 2010
19:00 KST

Daejeon KHNP	0–2	Suwon City
		Choi Gyu-hwan 26' (o.g.); Jang Ji-wook 78'

Daejeon Hanbat Stadium, Daejeon

20 November 2010
15:00 KST

Suwon City	0–1	Daejeon KHNP
		Kim Yoon-sik 38'

Suwon Civil Stadium, Suwon

Suwon City won 2–1 on aggregate.

== Awards ==
=== Main awards ===
Award	Winner	Club
Most Valuable Player	(South Korea) Lee Soo-kil	Suwon City
Top goalscorer	(South Korea) Kim Young-nam	Daejeon KHNP
Top assist provider	(South Korea) Kim Tae-bong	Yesan FC
Manager of the Year	(South Korea) Kim Chang-kyum	Suwon City
Club of the Year	Chungju Hummel	
Fair Play Award	Gangneung City	

=== Best XI ===
Position	Winner	Club
Goalkeeper	(South Korea) Chung Yoo-suk	Gangneung City
Defenders	(South Korea) Kim Jung-kyum	Daejeon KHNP
Defenders	(Brazil) Marcos Vinicius	Hyundai Mipo Dockyard
Defenders	(South Korea) Lee Soo-kil	Suwon City
Defenders	(South Korea) Lee Young-kyun	Suwon City
Midfielders	(South Korea) Cha Jong-yoon	Goyang KB Kookmin Bank
Midfielders	(South Korea) Kim Jang-hyun	Gangneung City
Midfielders	(South Korea) Jang Ji-soo	Busan Transportation Corporation
Midfielders	(South Korea) Lee Choon-hyun	Chungju Hummel
Forwards	(South Korea) Kim Young-nam	Daejeon KHNP
Forwards	(South Korea) Lee Yong-seung	Busan Transportation Corporation

== See also ==
- 2010 in South Korean football
- 2010 Korean FA Cup
