= Gimhae FC 2008 =

- Full name: Gimhae Football Club 2008 김해 축구단 2008
- Short name: GHFC
- Founded: 25 January 2008; 18 years ago
- Ground: Gimhae Sports Complex
- Capacity: 15,066
- Owner: Gimhae City
- Chairman: Jung Young-du (Mayor of Gimhae)
- Manager: Seol Ki-hyeon
- League: K League 2
- 2026: K League 2, 17th of 17
- Website: https://www.gimhaefc2008.com/
Home colours	Away colours

Gimhae FC 2008 (Korean: 김해 FC 2008) is a South Korean professional football club based in the city of Gimhae, South Gyeongsang which competes in the K League 2, the second tier of the South Korean football league system..

== History ==
The team was founded as Gimhae City Hall Football Club on 25 January 2008 to participate in the National League.

=== Semi-Professional League ===
2008 – Inaugural Season
In their first season, the Gimhae finished 5th in both the first and second stages of the season, giving them a final position of 5th overall.

2009 Season
In their second season, Gimhae managed to top the table in the first stage of the season, earning them a spot in the championship playoffs. In the semi-final, they beat Suwon City FC 2-1, but lost 2–4 on aggregate to Gangneung City FC.

2010–2019 Seasons
During the next decade, Gimhae finished mostly in the bottom half of the table, the exceptions being 2017 and 2018. For these two seasons, the top three positions in the league were identical, leading to similar playoff stories. Gimhae would beat Cheonan City on aggregate to advance to the final, where they would lose to Gyeongju KHNP on aggregate. In 2017 the score was 3-2 for Gyeongju, and in 2018 it was 4-1 for Gyeongju.

2019 would be their final season as a National League team, as the league was integrated into a restructured K3 League.

2020 Season – K3 League
Gimhae managed to finish at the top of the K3 League table, allowing them to go straight to the championship final where they finally managed to beat Gyeongju KHNP FC in the final with an aggregate score of 2-1.

2021–2024 Seasons
Over the next few seasons, the team finished in the top half of the table, but with the playoff system abolished, there were no more opportunities to become champions other than finishing first overall. Gimhae Citizen announced a change in the club's name to Gimhae FC 2008 from the 2025 season.

2025 Season – Final in Third tier
The team started the season well, earning 10 victories, 1 draw and one loss from their first 12 matches. The last 7 matches of their 12 matches were consecutive victories.

2025 would be their final season as a K3 League team, as the league was switched into a professional team in K League 2.

On 2 November 2025, Gimhae became champions of K3 League after a 1–1 draw against Pocheon Citizen with one game remaining, winning their second K3 League title , to add to their 2020 win.

=== Professional League ===
2026 season – K League 2
On 16 January 2026, Gimhae FC 2008 announced official confirmation of their participation in the K League 2 for the 2026 season after final approval of their membership of K League Federation.

On 18 January 2026, Gimhae FC 2008 announced their first official home match in the K League 2 against Ansan Greeners on 28 February 2026 at Gimhae Sports Complex.

== Colours and crest ==
The previous club crest included the Gimhae City logo.

On 9 February 2026, Gimhae FC 2008 announce official new logo and colour is Passion Red and Heritage Gold for 2026 season in K League 2.

== Honours ==
=== Domestic competitions ===
==== League ====
- National League
  - Runner-up (1): 2009
- K3 League
  - Champions (2): 2020, 2025

==== Cups ====
- National Sports Festival
  - Silver medal (1): 2014

== Season by season record ==
Season	Korea National League											Korean FA Cup	League Cup	Top scorer (League goals)	Manager
Season	Stage	Teams	P	W	D	L	GF	GA	GD	Pts	Position	Korean FA Cup	League Cup	Top scorer (League goals)	Manager
2008	First Stage	14	13	7	1	5	16	17	–1	22	5th	Preliminary Round 3	Quarterfinal	(South Korea) Yang Dong-Cheol (9)	(South Korea) Park Yang-Ha
2008	Second Stage	14	13	7	1	5	25	19	+6	22	5th	Preliminary Round 3	Quarterfinal	(South Korea) Yang Dong-Cheol (9)	(South Korea) Park Yang-Ha
2009	First Stage	14	13	8	2	3	26	20	+6	26	1st	Round 1	Semifinal	(South Korea) Chu Woon-Ki (10)	(South Korea) Park Yang-Ha
2009	Second Stage	13	12	4	4	4	19	17	+2	16	6th	Round 1	Semifinal	(South Korea) Chu Woon-Ki (10)	(South Korea) Park Yang-Ha
2009	Playoff	4	3	1	0	2	4	5	–1	3	Runner-up	Round 1	Semifinal	(South Korea) Chu Woon-Ki (10)	(South Korea) Park Yang-Ha
2010	First Stage	15	14	5	3	6	12	17	–5	18	11th	Preliminary Round 3	Round 1	(South Korea) Lee Jin-Hee (5)	(South Korea) Kim Han-Bong
2010	Second Stage	15	14	5	3	6	17	19	–2	18	11th	Preliminary Round 3	Round 1	(South Korea) Lee Jin-Hee (5)	(South Korea) Kim Han-Bong
2011	Group Stage	14	26	10	3	13	39	44	–5	33	10th	Round of 32	Group Round	(South Korea) Yoon Tae-Hyun (South Korea) Kim Won-Min (8)	(South Korea) Kim Han-Bong
2012	Group Stage	14	26	6	10	10	26	34	–8	28	11th	Round of 32	Group Round	(South Korea) Jung An-Sung (South Korea) Bang Jung-Rok (4)	(South Korea) Kim Gwi-Hwa
2013	Group Stage	10	27	8	12	7	32	31	+1	36	5th	Round of 32	Group Round		(South Korea) Kim Gwi-Hwa
2014	Group Stage	10	27	6	8	13	25	42	-17	26	9th	Second Round	Group Round		(South Korea) Kim Gwi-Hwa
2015	Group Stage	10	27	6	11	10	29	39	-10	29	7th	Third Round	Semifinal		(South Korea) Kim Gwi-Hwa
2016	Group Stage	10	27	8	10	9	37	34	+3	34	6th	Third Round	Semifinal		(South Korea) Kim Gwi-Hwa
2017	Group Stage	8	28	12	14	2	38	21	+17	50	2nd	Round of 32	Group Round		(South Korea) Yoon Sung-hyo
2018	Group Stage	8	28	16	8	4	46	20	+26	56	2nd	Quarterfinal	Semifinal		(South Korea) Yoon Sung-hyo
2019	Group Stage	8	28	7	7	14	26	29	-3	28	7th	Third Round	Group Round		(South Korea) Yoon Sung-hyo
Season	K3 League											Korean FA Cup	League Cup	Top scorer (League goals)	Manager
Season	Stage	Teams	P	W	D	L	GF	GA	GD	Pts	Position	Korean FA Cup	League Cup	Top scorer (League goals)	Manager
2020	Regular Season	16	22	15	4	3	39	18	+21	49	Winners	Third Round	None	(South Korea) Park Hee-Seong (8)	(South Korea) Yoon Sung-hyo
2021	Regular Season	15	28	12	8	8	39	35	+4	44	5th	Fourth Round	None	(Brazil) Luan Costa (12)	(South Korea) Yoon Sung-hyo
2022	Regular Season	16	30	12	9	9	33	26	+7	45	7th	Fourth Round	None	(Serbia) Marko Rajkovic (10)	(South Korea) Yoon Sung-hyo
2023	Regular Season	15	28	13	10	5	42	26	+19	49	3rd	First Round	None	(South Korea) Jang Han-young (11)	(South Korea) Yoon Sung-hyo
2024	Regular Season	16	30	13	11	6	42	28	+13	50	5th	Third Round	None	(South Korea) Jung Sang-gyu (11)	(South Korea) Son Hyun-jun
2025	Regular Season	15	28	18	7	3	48	20	+28	61	1st	Third Round	None	(South Korea) Lee Kang-uk (11)	(South Korea) Son Hyun-jun
Season	K League 2											Korea Cup	League Cup	Top scorer (League goals)	Manager
Season	Stage	Teams	P	W	D	L	GF	GA	GD	Pts	Position	Korea Cup	League Cup	Top scorer (League goals)	Manager
2026	Regular Season	17	32	0	0	0	0	0	0	0	17th	Third Round	None		(South Korea) Son Hyun-jun (South Korea) Choi Myung-sung (C) (South Korea) Seol Ki-hyeon

== Current squad ==
As of 4 August 2026.

Note: Flags indicate national team as defined under FIFA eligibility rules; some limited exceptions apply. Players may hold more than one non-FIFA nationality.

No.	Pos.	Nation	Player
1	GK	KOR	Jeong Jin-wook
2	DF	KOR	Kang Jun-mo (vice-captain)
3	DF	KOR	Lee Seul-chan
4	DF	KOR	Cha Jun-young
5	DF	KOR	Yeo Jae-yul
6	DF	KOR	Choi Jun-yeong
7	FW	KOR	Lee Seung-jae
8	MF	KOR	Moon Seung-min
9	FW	GEO	Beka Mikeltadze
11	FW	KOR	Lee Kang-wook
13	MF	KOR	Cho Young-kwang
14	MF	KOR	Pyo Geon-hee (vice-captain)
16	MF	KOR	Choe Won-cheol
17	DF	KOR	Lee Yu-chan
19	DF	KOR	Kim Hyun-deok (on loan from FC Seoul)
20	DF	KOR	Kim Dae-hyun
22	MF	KOR	Park Sang-jun

No.	Pos.	Nation	Player
23	MF	KOR	Sung Ho-yeung
24	MF	KOR	Myung Se-jin
25	GK	KOR	Han Jun-sung
27	MF	KOR	Lee Jun-gyu (on loan from Daejeon Hana Citizen)
28	MF	KOR	Park Hyung-bin
29	DF	KOR	Hong Wook-hyun
30	FW	KOR	Seol Hyeon-jin (on loan from Gyeongnam FC)
33	DF	KOR	Park Jae-hyeon (on loan from Daegu FC)
34	MF	KOR	Kwak Seong-uk
37	DF	KOR	Kim Dong-guk
41	MF	KOR	Park Yo-han
77	DF	KOR	Yoon Byeong-kwon (captain)
91	GK	KOR	Choi Pil-soo (vice-captain)
94	FW	KOR	Woo Je-wook
96	FW	POR	Rúben Macedo
98	MF	BRA	Miguel Baggio
99	FW	SEN	Maissa Fall

=== Out on loan ===
Note: Flags indicate national team as defined under FIFA eligibility rules; some limited exceptions apply. Players may hold more than one non-FIFA nationality.

No. / Pos. / Nation / Player; — / MF / KOR / Kim Kyung-soo (at FC Gangneung)	No. / Pos. / Nation / Player; — / MF / KOR / Lee Min-young (at Siheung Citizen)

== Backroom staff ==
=== Coaching staff ===
- Manager: (South Korea) Seol Ki-hyeon
- Assistant manager: (South Korea) Choi Myung-sung
- Goalkeeping coach: (South Korea) Baek Min-chul
- Coach: (South Korea) Kim Je-hwan
- Fitness coach: (South Korea) Moon min-sung

== Notes ==
League references pint to the K3 league. The National League used to be considered the third tier of Korean football, with K3 league being the fourth tier. When the National League was incorporated into the K3 League, the K3 league became the third tier and K4 League became the fourth tier. For results prior to 2020, K3 League refers to the then National League, and K4 League refers to the then K3 League.

== See also ==
- List of football clubs in South Korea
