= Goyang KB Kookmin Bank FC =

Goyang KB Kookmin Bank FC 고양 KB 국민은행 FC
- Full name: Goyang KB Kookmin Bank; Football Club 고양 KB 국민은행 축구단
- Nickname: Goyang KB
- Short name: GKB
- Founded: 1969; 2000 (refounded)
- Dissolved: 1997 (first iteration); 2012
- Ground: Goyang Stadium
- Capacity: 41,311
- Owner: KB Financial Group
- Chairman: Kang Jung-won
- Manager: Lee Woo-hyung
- League: National League
- 2012 Season: Runner-up
Home colours	Away colours

Goyang KB Kookmin Bank Football Club (Korean: 고양 KB 국민은행 축구단) was a South Korean football club based in the Seoul satellite city of Goyang. It played in the National League, the third tier of Korean football. The club was officially dissolved in November 2012.

== K-League Membership ==
Kookmin Bank FC was founded in September 1969 and competed in the various amateur football competitions at the time. The club enjoyed success in tournaments such as the Korea Semi-Professional Football League (winners in 1978) and the President's Cup (winners in 1978 and 1983) before becoming founder members of the K League, the professional football league in South Korea, in 1983.

The club's stay in the professional ranks was a short one, as it finished 5th out of five teams in the first year. When it came in 8th out of eight teams in 1984, the decision was made for the club to return to the amateur ranks.

== After the K-League ==
Upon returning to the amateur ranks, the club returned to winning ways and managed President's Cup triumphs in 1986, 1990 and 1995. It also won the 3rd edition of the Industrial Amateur Football championship in 1993, a tournament they would win again in 1996.

The financial crisis that struck South Korea in 1997 saw the club temporarily wound up, with the official decision to pull the plug on the team coming on December 31, 1997. After two years out of the game, Kookmin Bank reconstituted its club on February 28, 2000, and the team returned to the amateur ranks, eventually winning a sixth President's Cup crown in 2003.

== Life at K2 Level ==
Organised league football at the amateur level came about in 2003 with the establishment of the National League, a competition with ten members, of which Kookmin Bank was one. Initially based in Gimpo, the club won the first stage of the 2003 championship and then moved its home base to Goyang and the team's name was changed to Goyang Kookmin Bank for the second stage where they finished runners-up on goal difference. They defeated the reserve team of military side Sangmu 5–4 on aggregate in the playoff final to win the league. They retained their championship crown in 2004 with a 4–1 aggregate win over Gangneung City FC after having again won the first stage of the league season.

Despite a lacklustre 2005 season, the club bounced back to win the 2006 championship (now rebranded the National League), triumphing 2–1 on aggregate in the final after winning the first stage of the season.

== Promotion Controversy ==
It was planned that, subject to meeting certain financial requirements, the winner of the National League in 2006 would be promoted to the K League. However Goyang Kookmin Bank caused controversy by winning the league but declining to move up. Team owners Kookmin Bank cited a Korean law where banks in Korea were not allowed to be involved in profitable ventures outside of banking which of course a professional football team could be. However, the more likely reason is the large financial losses that most K League teams endure each year as the league struggles for sponsorship money and suffers through low crowd numbers. On top of that, any National League champion seeking promotion from the second tier is required to pay an 'entry fee' of around 2 million US dollars simply to join the league. Goyang Kookmin Bank received several threats from the League ranging from being thrown out of the competition, to fines, to point deductions for the upcoming 2007 season. In the end, the side received a points deduction penalty, to be split into ten point deductions in the first and second stages of the 2007 season.

== Current team squad ==
As of 1 March 2012

Note: Flags indicate national team as defined under FIFA eligibility rules; some limited exceptions apply. Players may hold more than one non-FIFA nationality.

No.	Pos.	Nation	Player
1	GK	KOR	Kim Byung-gon
3	DF	KOR	Han Gun-hee
4	DF	KOR	Kim Hyo-joon
5	DF	KOR	Kim Gi-joong
6	DF	KOR	Lee Sang-woo
7	FW	KOR	Park Byung-won
8	MF	KOR	Park Sung-jin
9	MF	KOR	Cha Jong-yun
10	FW	KOR	Kim Young-nam
11	FW	KOR	Ha Jung-heon
13	DF	KOR	Lee Sang-yong
14	FW	KOR	Lee Jae-won
15	MF	KOR	Lee Su-hwan
16	FW	KOR	Hwang Ho-ryoung
17	DF	KOR	Lee Dong-jun

No.	Pos.	Nation	Player
18	MF	KOR	Chun Won-goo
20	GK	KOR	Hwang Hee-hoon
21	GK	KOR	Jung Min-gyo
22	MF	KOR	Yu Byeong-uk
23	MF	KOR	Lee Yoon-ho
24	MF	KOR	Jung Da-seul
27	FW	KOR	Jung Hee-jin
30	DF	KOR	Oh Jeong-hwan
31	DF	KOR	Sung Jong-hyun
33	DF	KOR	Don Ji-duk
38	DF	KOR	Ryu Byung-hoon
40	GK	KOR	Choi Ik-hyung
66	MF	CHN	Bai Zijian
77	MF	KOR	Kim Won-min
88	MF	KOR	Park Jeong-sik

== Honours ==
=== Domestic competitions ===
==== League ====
- National League
  - Winners (3): 2003, 2004, 2006
  - Runners-up (2): 2011, 2012

==== Cups ====
- National League Championship
  - Winners (1): 2009
  - Runners-up (1): 2007
- National Football Championship
  - Winners (1): 1978
- President's Cup
  - Winners (6): 1973, 1983, 1986, 1990, 1995, 2003
  - Runners-up (4): 1982, 1988, 1991, 2005

== Statistics ==
Season	K-League												FA Cup	League Cup	Top scorer (League goals)	Manager
Season	Stage	Teams	P	W	D		L	GF	GA	GD	Pts	Position	FA Cup	League Cup	Top scorer (League goals)	Manager
1983	Single Stage	5	16	3	2		11	11	30	–19	8	5th	None	None	(South Korea) Lim Seok-Hyun (3) (South Korea) Kim Su-gil (3)	
Season	Stage	Teams	P	W	D	0D	L	GF	GA	GD	Pts	Position	FA Cup	League Cup	Top scorer	Manager
1984	First Stage	8	14	1	2	2	9	12	25	–13	20	8th	None	None	(South Korea) 6 players (3)	
1984	Second Stage	8	14	2	4	0	8	15	33	–18	14	8th	None	None	(South Korea) 6 players (3)	
1985-95	None												None	None		
1996	None												Round 1	None		
1997-99	On Hiatus															
2000	None												Round 1	None		
2001	None												Round 1	None		
2002	None												did not qualify	None		
Season	Korea National League												FA Cup	League Cup	Top scorer (League goals)	Manager
Season	Stage	Teams	P	W	D		L	GF	GA	GD	Pts	Position	FA Cup	League Cup	Top scorer (League goals)	Manager
2003	First Stage	10	9	6	2		1	14	6	+8	20	1st	Round of 16	None	(South Korea) Ko Min-gi (8)	
2003	Second Stage	10	9	5	4		0	13	5	+8	19	2nd	Round of 16	None	(South Korea) Ko Min-gi (8)	
2003	Playoff	2	2	1	1		0	5	4	+1	4	Champion	Round of 16	None	(South Korea) Ko Min-gi (8)	
2004	First Stage	10	9	7	2		0	17	5	+12	23	1st	Round of 16	Semifinal	(South Korea) Kim Dong-min (6)	(South Korea) Lee Woo-hyung
2004	Second Stage	10	9	3	3		3	9	8	+1	12	4th	Round of 16	Semifinal	(South Korea) Kim Dong-min (6)	(South Korea) Lee Woo-hyung
2004	Playoff	2	2	2	0		0	4	1	+3	6	Champion	Round of 16	Semifinal	(South Korea) Kim Dong-min (6)	(South Korea) Lee Woo-hyung
2005	First Stage	11	10	6	2		2	15	6	+9	20	3rd	Quarterfinal	Group stage	(South Korea) Choi Bae-sik (9)	(South Korea) Lee Woo-hyung
2005	Second Stage	11	10	4	3		3	13	7	+6	15	3rd	Quarterfinal	Group stage	(South Korea) Choi Bae-sik (9)	(South Korea) Lee Woo-hyung
2006	First Stage	11	10	8	2		0	26	8	+18	26	1st	Semifinal	Quarterfinal	(South Korea) Ko Min-gi (7)	(South Korea) Lee Woo-hyung
2006	Second Stage	11	10	4	2		4	12	10	+2	14	6th	Semifinal	Quarterfinal	(South Korea) Ko Min-gi (7)	(South Korea) Lee Woo-hyung
2006	Playoff	2	2	1	1		0	2	0	+2	4	Champion	Semifinal	Quarterfinal	(South Korea) Ko Min-gi (7)	(South Korea) Lee Woo-hyung
2007	First Stage	12	11	7	2		2	20	8	+12	13^{1}	6th	Round of 16	Runner-up	(South Korea) Lim Jin-young (7)	(South Korea) Lee Woo-hyung
2007	Second Stage	12	11	6	2		3	26	13	+13	10^{1}	9th	Round of 16	Runner-up	(South Korea) Lim Jin-young (7)	(South Korea) Lee Woo-hyung
2008	First Stage	14	13	6	3		4	23	14	+9	21	6th	Semifinal	Quarterfinal	(South Korea) Kim Hyun-gi (5) (South Korea) Kim Yo-han (5) (South Korea) Cha Jong-yoon (5)	(South Korea) Lee Woo-hyung
2008	Second Stage	14	13	5	4		4	12	12	0	19	7th	Semifinal	Quarterfinal	(South Korea) Kim Hyun-gi (5) (South Korea) Kim Yo-han (5) (South Korea) Cha Jong-yoon (5)	(South Korea) Lee Woo-hyung
2009	First Stage	14	13	4	4		5	18	16	+2	16	8th	Round of 16	Winner	(South Korea) Park Byung-won (7)	(South Korea) Lee Woo-hyung
2009	Second Stage	13	12	5	4		3	17	15	+2	19	5th	Round of 16	Winner	(South Korea) Park Byung-won (7)	(South Korea) Lee Woo-hyung
2010	First Stage	15	14	7	3		4	19	12	+7	24	4th	Semifinal	Quarterfinal	(South Korea) Lee Wan-hee (7)	(South Korea) Lee Woo-hyung
2010	Second Stage	15	14	7	4		3	20	15	+5	25	5th	Semifinal	Quarterfinal	(South Korea) Lee Wan-hee (7)	(South Korea) Lee Woo-hyung
2010	Playoff	4	1	0	0		1	1	2	–1		Semifinal	Semifinal	Quarterfinal	(South Korea) Lee Wan-hee (7)	(South Korea) Lee Woo-hyung
2011	—	14	26	13	8		5	37	25	+12	47	2nd	Round of 32	Group stage	(South Korea) Park Sung-jin (8)	(South Korea) Lee Woo-hyung
2011	Playoff	6	3	1	1		1	4	4	0	4	Runner-up	Round of 32	Group stage	(South Korea) Park Sung-jin (8)	(South Korea) Lee Woo-hyung
2012	—	14	26	15	10		1	51	20	+31	55	1st	Quarterfinal	Semifinal		(South Korea) Lee Woo-hyung
2012	Playoff	6	2	1	0		1	2	4	-2	3	Runner-up	Quarterfinal	Semifinal		(South Korea) Lee Woo-hyung

1: Goyang KB Kookmin Bank was docked 10 points due to rejecting of promotion.

== See also ==
- List of football clubs in South Korea
- KB Kookmin Bank
- FC Anyang
