= South Korean football league system =

- Country: South Korea
- Sport: Association football
- Promotion and relegation: Partial (for men); No (for women)

National system
- Federation: Korea Football Association
- Confederation: AFC
- Top division: K League 1 (men); WK League (women)
- Second division: K League 2
- Cup competition: Korea Cup

The South Korean football league system contains two professional leagues, two semi-professional leagues, and various amateur leagues for South Korean football clubs.

The top-tier league of the system is the K League 1, which was founded in 1983. The second-tier professional league was founded in 2013 under the name of K League 2. Below the two professional leagues, there are two semi-professional leagues, namely the K3 League and the K4 League.

South Korean female footballers participate at the WK League, the sole semi-professional league founded in 2009.

== System by period ==
The National Semi-professional Football League was the first-ever semi-professional football league in South Korea, and was contested between works teams and military teams from 1964 to 2002. It became the second-tier league after the K League was established in 1983, and was replaced by the Korea National League in 2003.

The first official amateur league, regarded as the third-tier league, was founded in 2007, and was named the K3 League. The National League and the amateur K3 League were demoted to the third and fourth-tier leagues after the K League 2 appeared in 2013.

In 2017, the amateur K3 League was divided into two divisions, the K3 League Advanced and the K3 League Basic. They were renamed the K3 League and the K4 League respectively when being relaunched as semi-professional leagues in 2020. The National League was merged into the new K3 League at the same time.

A system of promotion and relegation has been realised within each of three classes (professional, semi-professional and amateur) from the beginning, but there was no promotion and relegation between classes until 2025. The Korea Football Association (KFA) went over their plans to unify the league system including promotions and relegations between three classes for a long time. Since 2026, the KFA are partially allowing a play-off between the K League 2 and the K3 League as well as promotion from the K5 League to the K4 League (without relegation from K4 to K5), according to the results of their examination.

Professional leagues (K League)
Semi-professional leagues
Amateur leagues

Year	Tier 1	Tier 2	Tier 3	Tier 4	Tier 5	Tier 6	Tier 7	Tier 8 and under
1964–1982	National Semipro League							
1983	K League (Note: Named "Super League" from 1983 to 1985, "Football Festival" in 1986, "Korean Professional Football League" from 1987 to 1993, "Korean League" from 1994 to 1995, "Professional Football League" from 1996 to 1997, "K League" since 1998.)	Korean League Division 1	Korean League Division 2					
1984–2002	K League	National Semipro League						
2003–2006	K League	National League						
2007–2012	K League	National League	K3 League (amateur)					
2013–2016	K League 1 (Note: Named "K League Classic" from 2013 to 2017, "K League 1" since 2018.)	K League 2 (Note: Named "K League Challenge" from 2013 to 2017, "K League 2" since 2018.)	National League	K3 League (amateur)				
2017–2019	K League 1	K League 2	National League	K3 League Advanced	K3 League Basic	Under construction		
2020–present	K League 1	K League 2	K3 League	K4 League	K5 League	K6 League	K7 League	Regional competitions

== Current system ==
Outside this league structure, there are the U-League and the R League, contested by university teams and reserve teams respectively.

As of 27 January 2026

Level	Division	Class
1	K League 1; 12 clubs ↓ 1 relegation spot (Note: Gimcheon Sangmu will be directly relegated to the K League 2 at the end of the 2026 season.) + 1 relegation play-off spot (Note: If Gimcheon Sangmu finish 12th at the 2026 K League 1, the promotion-relegation play-offs between the 12th-placed team of the K League 1 and runners-up of the K League 2 play-off will not be held.)	Professional
2	K League 2; 17 clubs ↑ 3 promotion spots (Note: The number of K League 1 teams will increase to 14 in the 2027 season.) + 1 promotion play-off spot ↓ 1 relegation play-off spot (Note: If the K3 League champions do not get a license for professionalisation from the K League Federation, their promotion play-offs will not be held.)	Professional
3	K3 League; 14 clubs ↑ 1 promotion play-off spot ↓ 1 relegation spots + 1 relegation play-off spot (Note: Before July, all K4 League teams have to choose whether to require promotion or not. If the team who do not want to be promoted become champions or runners-up, their promotion to the K3 League is nullified.)	Semi-professional
4	K4 League; 13 clubs ↑ 1 promotion spots + 1 promotion play-off spot	Semi-professional
5	K5 League; 84 clubs in 13 groups ↑ 2 promotion spots (Note: The K5 League champions and runners-up can be promoted to the K4 League, if they get licenses for the K4 League from the Korea Football Association.) ↓ 13 relegation spots	Amateur
6	K6 League; 192 clubs in 31 groups ↑ 13 promotion spots ↓ 31 relegation spots	Amateur
7	K7 League; 1223 clubs in 187 groups ↑ 31 promotion spots	Amateur
8 and under	Regional competitions	Amateur

== Qualification for cups ==
=== Domestic cups ===
K League, K3 League, K4 League, and some K5 League clubs qualify for the Korea Cup.

The Korean League Cup was open to K League teams only, whilst National League teams could compete in the National League Championship. They were abolished in 2012 and 2020, respectively.

The K League Super Cup is contested between the K League 1 champions and the Korea Cup champions.

=== Continental competition ===
As of 2026, the top two K League 1 clubs and the Korea Cup champions qualify for the AFC Champions League Elite. If the Korea Cup champions finish outside the top four at the K League 1, they participate at the AFC Champions League Two instead of the third-placed team of the K League 1.

== See also ==
- Football in South Korea
- K League
- List of South Korean football champions
