= Korea National League =

Semi-professional South Korean football league (2003–2019)

- Founded: 2003; 23 years ago
- Folded: 2019
- Country: South Korea
- Level on pyramid: 2 (2003–2012); 3 (2013–2019)
- Domestic cup: Korean FA Cup
- League cup: National League Championship
- Most championships: Hyundai Mipo Dockyard (7 titles)
- Website: n-league.net

The Korea National League (Korean: 내셔널리그) was a South Korean semi-professional football league held annually from 2003 to 2019. It was considered the second-highest division of the South Korean football league system before the K League 2 was launched in 2013, and the third-highest division from 2013 to its folding in 2019.

== History ==
The Korea National League was officially founded as K2 League in 2003 to execute a plan to professionalize the Korean National Semi-Professional Football League. The participating clubs of the National League were required to be based in their specific hometowns unlike in the Semi-professional League era.

In 2006, the K2 League was re-branded as the Korea National League, and its champions were decided to promote to the K League. However, Goyang KB Kookmin Bank and Hyundai Mipo Dockyard, the champions of the 2006 and 2007 season respectively, judged that they couldn't derive benefit from their professionalization, and rejected their promotion. The Korea Football Association and the K League Federation eventually prepared another project to found the second-tier professional league which is irrelevant to the National League.

At the end of 2019, the Korea National League was absorbed into the K3 League.

== All-time clubs ==
No.	Club	Owner(s)
1	Iksan Hallelujah (2003); Gimpo Hallelujah (2004–2006); Ansan Hallelujah (2007–2011); Ansan H FC (2012)	
2	Daejeon KHNP (2003–2012); Gyeongju KHNP (2013–2019)	Korea Hydro & Nuclear Power
3	Gangneung City (2003–2019)	Government of Gangneung
4	Gimpo Kookmin Bank (2003); Goyang Kookmin Bank (2003–2005); Goyang KB Kookmin Bank (2006–2012)	Kookmin Bank
5	Incheon Korail (2003–2013); Daejeon Korail (2014–2019)	Korail
6	Uijeongbu Hummel (2003–2005); Icheon Hummel (2006–2007); Nowon Hummel (2008–2009); Chungju Hummel (2010–2012)	Hummel Korea
7	Icheon Sangmu (2003–2005)	Korea Armed Forces Athletic Corps
8	Suwon City (2003–2012)	Government of Suwon
9	Hyundai Mipo Dockyard (2003–2016)	Hyundai Mipo Dockyard
10	Seosan Citizen (2003–2006); Seosan Omega (2007); Yesan FC (2008–2010)	Government of Seosan (2003–2007); Government of Yesan (2008–2010)
11	Seoul City (2003)	Government of Seoul
12	Changwon City (2005–2019)	Government of Changwon
13	Busan Transportation Corporation (2006–2019)	Busan Transportation Corporation
14	INGNEX FC (2007); Hongcheon Idu (2008–2009)	INGNEX (2007); Idu Construction (2008–2009)
15	Cheonan City (2008–2019)	Government of Cheonan
16	Gimhae City (2008–2019)	Government of Gimhae
17	Mokpo City (2010–2019)	Government of Mokpo
18	Yongin City (2010–2016)	Government of Yongin

== Champions ==
=== Champions by season ===
Season	Champions	Runners-up
2003	Goyang Kookmin Bank	Icheon Sangmu
2004	Goyang Kookmin Bank	Gangneung City
2005	Incheon Korail	Suwon City
2006	Goyang Kookmin Bank	Gimpo Hallelujah
2007	Hyundai Mipo Dockyard	Suwon City
2008	Hyundai Mipo Dockyard	Suwon City
2009	Gangneung City	Gimhae City
2010	Suwon City	Daejeon KHNP
2011	Hyundai Mipo Dockyard	Goyang KB Kookmin Bank
2012	Incheon Korail	Goyang KB Kookmin Bank
2013	Hyundai Mipo Dockyard	Gyeongju KHNP
2014	Hyundai Mipo Dockyard	Daejeon Korail
2015	Hyundai Mipo Dockyard	Gyeongju KHNP
2016	Hyundai Mipo Dockyard	Gangneung City
2017	Gyeongju KHNP	Gimhae City
2018	Gyeongju KHNP	Gimhae City
2019	Gangneung City	Gyeongju KHNP

=== Performance by club ===
Club	Champions	Runners-up
Hyundai Mipo Dockyard	7 (2007, 2008, 2011, 2013, 2014, 2015, 2016)	—
Goyang KB Kookmin Bank	3 (2003, 2004, 2006)	2 (2011, 2012)
Gyeongju KHNP	2 (2017, 2018)	4 (2010, 2013, 2015, 2019)
Gangneung City	2 (2009, 2019)	2 (2004, 2016)
Daejeon Korail	2 (2005, 2012)	1 (2014)
Suwon City	1 (2010)	3 (2005, 2007, 2008)
Gimhae City	—	3 (2009, 2017, 2018)
Icheon Sangmu	—	1 (2003)
Gimpo Hallelujah	—	1 (2006)

== Sponsorship ==
Sponsor	Season	Competition
Hyundai Motor Company	2003 (Note: Only the first stage)	Hyundai Motors Cup K2 League
Intermax AD	2003 (Note: Only the second stage)	Intermax Cup K2 League
Hyundai Motor Company	2004	Hyundai Motors Cup K2 League
Kookmin Bank	2005	KB Kookmin Bank Cup K2 League
STC Company	2006–2007	STC Cup National League
Kookmin Bank	2007–2008	KB Kookmin Bank National League
Kyobo Life Insurance	2009	Kyobo Life National League
Korea Life Insurance	2010	Daehan Life National League
Samsung Life Insurance	2011	Samsung Life National League
Shinhan Bank	2012–2013	Shinhan Bank National League
Samsung Life Insurance	2014	Samsung Life National League
Incheon International Airport Corporation	2015–2017	Incheon International Airport National League
Hanwha Life Insurance	2018	Hanhwa Life National League
Kyobo Life Insurance	2019	Kyobo Life National League

== See also ==
- South Korean football league system
- Korean Semi-professional Football League
- K3 League
- Korea National League Championship
- List of foreign Korea National League players
