= Goyang Zaicro FC =

Goyang Zaicro FC 고양 자이크로 FC
- Full name: Goyang Zaicro Football Club 고양 자이크로 축구단
- Founded: 1999; 27 years ago
- Dissolved: 2016; 10 years ago
- Ground: Goyang Stadium
- Capacity: 41,311
Home colours	Away colours

Goyang Zaicro Football Club (Korean: 고양 자이크로 FC) was a South Korean professional football team based in Goyang. The club competed in the K League Challenge between 2013 and 2016. They played their home games at Goyang Stadium.

The club traces its origins to Immanuel FC, a Christian football club founded in 1983. The team previously played in Iksan and Gimpo before moving to Ansan, in 2007.

== History ==
Immanuel FC, the predecessor of Goyang Zaicro FC, was founded in 1983. In 1985, Immanuel FC and Hallelujah FC decided to merge to create a unified Christian football club. As a result, Immanuel FC became Hallelujah's reserve team. After the 1985 season, Hallelujah FC left the professional ranks in order to concentrate their financial resources on missionary work.

The two clubs separated after one year. Immanuel FC participated in many tournaments as an amateur football club. They even competed with Hallelujah FC in 1991.

In 1992, Immanuel FC suffered from a lack of funds. Therefore, E-Land took over the team and renamed it E-Land Puma FC. From 1992 to 1998, they won three tournaments.

At the start of 1998, the Asian economic crisis affected the club's parent group E-Land, necessitating the release of the club, which became amateur again as Immanuel FC. The club brought in some footballers for Hallelujah FC and changed their name to Hallelujah FC. This Hallelujah FC founded in 1999 is the official starting point of Goyang Hi FC history by K League. In 2003 the team moved to Iksan and joined the Korea National League, finishing a creditable third after the First Stage, but were prevented from competing in the Second Stage after protests by radical Won Buddhists led to the club being barred from playing in Iksan. The club moved to Gimpo, where they enjoyed their most successful season in the National League in 2006, completing the Second Stage at the summit of the league, before being defeated in the Championship Play-off. The club moved again, this time to Ansan, in 2007, enjoying another successful campaign in 2008, a season which saw them reach the final of the National League Championship, where they were defeated on penalties, before evolving into Ansan 'H' FC for the 2012 National League season. In September 2012, it was confirmed that the team would be moving to Goyang City for the 2013 season, and will change its name to Goyang Hi FC.

On 18 January 2016, the club's name was officially changed to Goyang Zaicro FC for the 2016 season due to sponsorship reasons. The club was disbanded after the 2016 season.

== Club naming history ==
Predecessor

- 1983–1984: Immanuel FC
- 1985: Hallelujah FC (reserve team)
- 1986–1992: Immanuel FC
- 1992–1998: E-Land Puma FC
- 1998: Immanuel FC

Refounded

- 1999–2002: Hallelujah FC
- 2003: Iksan Hallelujah FC
- 2004–2006: Gimpo Hallelujah FC
- 2007–2011: Ansan Hallelujah FC
- 2012: Ansan H FC
- 2013–2015: Goyang Hi FC
- 2016: Goyang Zaicro FC

== Managers ==
No.	Name	From	To	Season	Notes
1	(South Korea) Lee Young-moo	1999/04/03	2005/12/31	1999–2005	First manager
C	(South Korea) Na Byung-soo	2006/01/01	2006/12/31	2006	
2	(South Korea) Na Byung-soo	2007/01/01	2007/12/31	2007	
C	(South Korea) In Chang-soo	2008/01/01	2008/12/31	2008	
3	(South Korea) Lee Young-moo	2009/01/01	2014/07/24	2009–2014	
C	(South Korea) Lee Sung-kil	2014/07/27	2015/02/16	2014	
4	(South Korea) Lee Young-moo	2015/02/16	2016/02/25	2015	
5	(South Korea) Lee Nak-young	2016/02/25	2016/12/31	2016	

== Honours ==
=== Domestic competitions ===
==== League ====
- National League
  - Runners-up (1): 2006

==== Cups ====
- National Football Championship
  - Winners (1): 2006
  - Runners-up (1): 2002

=== Worldwide competitions ===
- Queen's Cup
  - Winners (1): 2009

== Statistics ==
Season	Korea National League											Korean FA Cup	League Cup	Top scorer (League goals)	Manager
Season	Stage	Teams	P	W	D	L	GF	GA	GD	Pts	Position	Korean FA Cup	League Cup	Top scorer (League goals)	Manager
2003	First Stage	10	9	4	3	2	20	15	+5	15	3rd	Qualifying Round 2	None	(South Korea) Lee Sung-kil (7)	(South Korea) Lee Young-moo
2003	Second Stage	10	0	0	0	0	0	0	0	0	Excluded	Qualifying Round 2	None	(South Korea) Lee Sung-kil (7)	(South Korea) Lee Young-moo
2004	First Stage	10	9	2	3	4	11	15	−4	9	8th	Quarterfinal	Group Round	(South Korea) Lee Sung-kil (6)	(South Korea) Lee Young-moo
2004	Second Stage	10	9	0	5	4	7	13	−6	5	10th	Quarterfinal	Group Round	(South Korea) Lee Sung-kil (6)	(South Korea) Lee Young-moo
2005	First Stage	11	10	5	2	3	11	12	−1	17	5th	Round 1	Group Round	(South Korea) Lee Sung-kil (11)	(South Korea) Lee Young-moo
2005	Second Stage	11	10	4	3	3	19	15	+4	15	4th	Round 1	Group Round	(South Korea) Lee Sung-kil (11)	(South Korea) Lee Young-moo
2006	First Stage	11	10	3	3	4	11	12	−1	12	7th	Round 1	Group Round	(South Korea) Lee Sung-kil (8) (South Korea) Sung Ho-sang (8)	(South Korea) Na Byung-Soo
2006	Second Stage	11	10	7	2	1	16	8	+8	23	1st	Round 1	Group Round	(South Korea) Lee Sung-kil (8) (South Korea) Sung Ho-sang (8)	(South Korea) Na Byung-Soo
2006	Playoff	2	2	0	1	1	0	2	−2	1	Runner-up	Round 1	Group Round	(South Korea) Lee Sung-kil (8) (South Korea) Sung Ho-sang (8)	(South Korea) Na Byung-Soo
2007	First Stage	12	11	3	3	5	9	15	−6	12	9th	Round 1	Group Round	(South Korea) Lee Sung-kil (5)	(South Korea) Na Byung-Soo
2007	Second Stage	12	11	3	4	4	16	17	−1	13	7th	Round 1	Group Round	(South Korea) Lee Sung-kil (5)	(South Korea) Na Byung-Soo
2008	First Stage	14	13	4	2	7	18	21	−3	14	10th	Round of 16	Runner-up	(South Korea) Park Han-woong (6)	(South Korea) In Chang-soo
2008	Second Stage	14	13	7	4	2	22	15	+7	25	3rd	Round of 16	Runner-up	(South Korea) Park Han-woong (6)	(South Korea) In Chang-soo
2009	First Stage	14	13	6	4	3	19	14	+5	22	6th	Round of 32	Quarterfinal	(South Korea) Jeon Jae-hee (7) (South Korea) Kang Tae-sung (7)	(South Korea) Lee Young-moo
2009	Second Stage	13	12	4	3	5	11	10	+1	15	8th	Round of 32	Quarterfinal	(South Korea) Jeon Jae-hee (7) (South Korea) Kang Tae-sung (7)	(South Korea) Lee Young-moo
2010	First Stage	15	14	3	1	10	14	26	−12	10	13th	Round of 32	Quarterfinal	(South Korea) Lee Joo-sang (10)	(South Korea) Lee Young-moo
2010	Second Stage	15	14	6	0	8	21	22	−1	18	10th	Round of 32	Quarterfinal	(South Korea) Lee Joo-sang (10)	(South Korea) Lee Young-moo
2011	—	14	26	5	8	13	25	42	−17	23	12th	Round of 32	None	(South Korea) Kim Dong-hyo (5)	(South Korea) Lee Young-moo
2012	—	14	26	8	8	10	25	34	−9	32	10th	Qualifying Round 2	Group Round		(South Korea) Lee Young-moo

== See also ==
- Hallelujah FC
- E-Land Puma FC
