= 2026 K3·K4 Championship =

Tournament details
- Country: South Korea
- Dates: 5 May – 19 September 2026
- Teams: 27

Final positions
- Champions: Busan Transportation Corporation (1st title)
- Runners-up: Pocheon Citizen

Tournament statistics
- Matches played: 26
- Top goal scorer: Min Dong-hoo (4 goals)

Awards
- Best player: Jan Rabens

The 2026 K3·K4 Championship is the first competition of the K3·K4 Championship. It is a single-elimination tournament which consists of five rounds, and is contested from 5 May to 19 September by 27 clubs who entered the 2026 K3 League or the 2026 K4 League.

Five out of the 27 participating clubs randomly advanced to the second round without playing the first round.

The K League players who are temporarily serving as social service personnel of K4 League clubs do not qualify for the tournament.

== Prize money ==
| Place | Amount |
|---|---|
| Champions | ₩30 million |
| Runners-up | ₩10 million |

== Bracket ==
First round
Jeonbuk Hyundai Motors N | 0
Yeoju FC | 1
Sejong SA | 2
Yangpyeong FC | 0
Gijang United | Bye
— | —
Pyeongchang United | 0
Busan Transportation Corporation | 2
Siheung Citizen | 2
Jincheon HR | 1
Dangjin Citizen | Bye
— | —
Namyangju FC | 3
Ulsan Citizen (a.e.t.) | 4
Seosan Pioneer | 0
Daejeon Korail | 1
Seoul Jungnang | Bye
— | —
Chuncheon FC | 2
FC Mokpo | 1
Geoje Citizen | 4
Geumsan Insam | 1
Pyeongtaek Citizen | 0
Jecheon Citizen | 2
Gyeongju KHNP | Bye
— | —
Jinju Citizen | 2
Haman FC | 1
FC Gangneung | 1
Pocheon Citizen | 2
Changwon FC | Bye
— | —

Round of 16
Yeoju FC | 4
Sejong SA | 3
Gijang United | 0
Busan Transportation Corporation | 3
Siheung Citizen | 1
Dangjin Citizen | 0
Ulsan Citizen (p) | 2 (5)
Daejeon Korail | 2 (4)
Seoul Jungnang | 1
Chuncheon FC | 6
Geoje Citizen (p) | 1 (5)
Jecheon Citizen | 1 (4)
Gyeongju KHNP | 3
Jinju Citizen | 2
Pocheon Citizen | 3
Changwon FC | 2

Quarter-finals
Yeoju FC | 0
Busan Transportation Corporation | 2
Siheung Citizen | 0
Ulsan Citizen | 1
Chuncheon FC | 1
Geoje Citizen | 2
Gyeongju KHNP | 2
Pocheon Citizen | 5

Semi-finals
Busan Transportation Corporation | 1
Ulsan Citizen | 0
Geoje Citizen | 1
Pocheon Citizen | 2

Final
Busan Transportation Corporation | 1
Pocheon Citizen | 0

== Quarter-finals ==
| 13 June 2026 | Chuncheon FC (3) | 1–2 | Geoje Citizen (4) | Chuncheon Songam Sports Town, Chuncheon |
| 19:00 UTC+9 | Han Yong-soo 17' | Report | Kim Hyeon-min 30' (pen.); Lee Ju-won 88' |

| 13 June 2026 | Gyeongju KHNP (3) | 2–5 | Pocheon Citizen (3) | Gyeongju Football Park, Gyeongju |
| 19:00 UTC+9 | Yoo Shin 45+2'; Jin Sung-wook 61' | Report | Yoo Yong-hyun 10', 85'; Lee Jae-geon 44' (pen.); Lee Seok-gyu 51'; Kim Hyun-joong 81' |

| 13 June 2026 | Siheung Citizen (3) | 0–1 | Ulsan Citizen (3) | Jeongwang Stadium, Siheung |
| 19:00 UTC+9 | | Report | Kang Min-jae 41' |

| 14 June 2026 | Yeoju FC (3) | 0–2 | Busan Transportation Corporation (3) | Yeoju Stadium, Yeoju |
| 19:00 UTC+9 | | Report | Park Hee-soo 35'; Yang Jeong-woon 90+6' (pen.) |

== Semi-finals ==
| 14 August 2026 | Busan Transportation Corporation (3) | 1–0 | Ulsan Citizen (3) | Busan Gudeok Stadium, Busan |
| 18:00 UTC+9 | Jo Yong-joon 68' | Report |

| 15 August 2026 | Pocheon Citizen (3) | 2–1 | Geoje Citizen (4) | Pocheon Sports Complex, Pocheon |
| 18:00 UTC+9 | Yoo Seon-woo 37', 55' | Report | Park Geon-woong 70' |

== Final ==
| 19 September 2026 | Pocheon Citizen (3) | 0–1 | Busan Transportation Corporation (3) | Pocheon Sports Complex, Pocheon |
| 16:50 UTC+9 | | Report | Rabens 56' |
