= 2026–27 Korea Cup =

2026–27 Hana Bank Korea Cup

Tournament details
- Country: South Korea
- Dates: 20 June 2026 – 5 June 2027
- Teams: 63

The 2026–27 Korea Cup, known as the 2026–27 Hana Bank Korea Cup (Korean: 2026–27 하나은행 코리아컵) for sponsorship reasons, was the 31st edition of the Korea Cup. The winners of the competition could have qualified for the 2027–28 season of AFC Champions League Elite if they would have finished top four in the 2026 K League 1 otherwise, qualified for the AFC Champions League Two. Jeonbuk Hyundai Motors were the defending champions. This was the first season switched to Summer-Spring calendar.

== Schedule ==
The draw was held on 21 May 2026 at the Korea Football Park in Cheonan. It decided all the match-ups from the preliminary round to the fourth round (round of 16) along with the playing dates. The second draw will be held in 2027, and will be decided all the match-ups from the quarter-finals to the final.

| Round | Draw date | Date | Matches | Clubs remaining | Clubs involved | New entries this round |
|---|---|---|---|---|---|---|
| Preliminary round | 21 May 2026 | 20 June 2026 | 4 | 63 | 8 | 8 K5 League teams |
| First round | 21 May 2026 | 4–5 July 2026 | 15 | 59 | 4+26 | 13 K3 League teams 13 K4 League teams |
| Second round | 21 May 2026 | 15 July 2026 | 16 | 44 | 15+17 | 17 K League 2 teams |
| Third round | 21 May 2026 | 29 July 2026 | 12 | 28 | 16+8 | 8 K League 1 teams |
| Round of 16 | 21 May 2026 | 19 August 2026 | 8 | 16 | 12+4 | 4 Champions League Elite teams |
| Quarter-finals | 2027 | 19 May 2027 | 4 | 8 | 8 | None |
| Semi-finals | 2027 | 26 May 2027 | 2 | 4 | 4 | None |
| Final | 2027 | 5 June 2027 | 1 | 2 | 2 | None |

== Preliminary round ==
| Team 1 | Score | Team 2 |
|---|---|---|
| Yangsan United FC (5) | 1–2 | Anseong Citizen FC (5) |
| Yeonsu Songdo FC (5) | 0–4 | Ulsan Nam-gu ULSAN FC (5) |
| Cheongju Showking FC (5) | 3–9 | Seoul Yangcheon TNT FC (5) |
| Seohae Seogot SM FC (5) | 2–1 | Yeosu Areum FC (5) |

== First round ==
| Team 1 | Score | Team 2 |
|---|---|---|
| Jincheon HR (4) | 1–1 (a.e.t.); 5–6 (p) | Siheung Citizen (3) |
| Ulsan Citizen (3) | 2–1 | Chuncheon FC (3) |
| FC Mokpo (3) | 3–2 | Anseong Citizen FC (5) |
| Busan Transportation Corporation (3) | 2–1 | Gijang United (4) |
| Jinju Citizen (4) | 2–1 (a.e.t.) | Sejong SA (4) |
| Gyeongju KHNP (3) | 3–0 | Seosan Pioneer (4) |
| Ulsan Nam-gu ULSAN FC (5) | 1–5 (a.e.t.) | Yangpyeong FC (3) |
| Pyeongtaek Citizen (4) | 1–3 | Yeoju FC (3) |
| Haman FC (4) | 0–2 (a.e.t.) | Dangjin Citizen (3) |
| Namyangju FC (4) | 3–1 | Seoul Jungnang (4) |
| Seoul Yangcheon TNT FC (5) | 1–2 (a.e.t.) | Pyeongchang United (4) |
| Changwon FC (3) | 3–0 | Geumsan Insam (4) |
| Pocheon Citizen (3) | 2–0 | Daejeon Korail (3) |
| Geoje Citizen (4) | 4–0 | Seohae Seogot SM FC (5) |
| FC Gangneung (3) | 2–0 | Jecheon Citizen (4) |

== Second round ==
| Team 1 | Score | Team 2 |
|---|---|---|
| Jeonnam Dragons (2) | 3–4 (a.e.t.) | Chungnam Asan (2) |
| Daegu FC (2) | 0–1 | Siheung Citizen (3) |
| Ulsan Citizen (3) | 4–2 (a.e.t.) | Seoul E-Land (2) |
| Cheonan City (2) | 2–1 | FC Mokpo (3) |
| Busan Transportation Corporation (3) | 2–1 (a.e.t.) | Suwon Samsung Bluewings (2) |
| Ansan Greeners (2) | 0–2 | Jinju Citizen (4) |
| Chungbuk Cheongju (2) | 4–0 | Gyeongju KHNP (3) |
| Hwaseong FC (2) | 4–3 | Yangpyeong FC (3) |
| Gyeongnam FC (2) | 0–1 (a.e.t.) | Yeoju FC (3) |
| Yongin FC (2) | 0–2 | Dangjin Citizen (3) |
| Namyangju FC (4) | 1–2 | Gimpo FC (2) |
| Suwon FC (2) | 3–2 | Pyeongchang United (4) |
| Changwon FC (3) | 1–5 | Gimhae FC 2008 (2) |
| Seongnam FC (2) | 2–1 (a.e.t.) | Pocheon Citizen (3) |
| Busan IPark (2) | 4–0 | Geoje Citizen (4) |
| Paju Frontier (2) | 3–2 | FC Gangneung (3) |

== Third round ==
| Team 1 | Score | Team 2 |
|---|---|---|
| Chungnam Asan (2) | 2–1 | Siheung Citizen (3) |
| Ulsan Citizen (3) | 1–0 | Ulsan HD (1) |
| Gwangju FC (1) | 1–0 | Cheonan City (2) |
| Busan Transportation Corporation (3) | 1–1 (a.e.t.); 4–5 (p) | Jinju Citizen (4) |
| Chungbuk Cheongju (2) | 1–3 | FC Anyang (1) |
| Jeju SK (1) | 3–3 (a.e.t.); 4–3 (p) | Hwaseong FC (2) |
| Yeoju FC (3) | 0–1 | Dangjin Citizen (3) |
| Incheon United (1) | 0–1 | Gimpo FC (2) |
| Gimcheon Sangmu (1) | 2–1 | Suwon FC (2) |
| Gimhae FC 2008 (2) | 0–1 | Seongnam FC (2) |
| Busan IPark (2) | 2–0 | FC Seoul (1) |
| Bucheon FC 1995 (1) | 3–0 | Paju Frontier (2) |

== Round of 16 ==
| Team 1 | Score | Team 2 |
|---|---|---|
| Chungnam Asan (2) | 2–3 | Daejeon Hana Citizen (1) |
| Ulsan Citizen (3) | 0–1 | Gwangju FC (1) |
| Pohang Steelers (1) | 3–1 | Jinju Citizen (4) |
| FC Anyang (1) | 2–1 | Jeju SK (1) |
| Jeonbuk Hyundai Motors (1) | 2–2 (a.e.t.); 3–5 (p) | Dangjin Citizen (3) |
| Gimpo FC (2) | 2–1 | Gimcheon Sangmu (1) |
| Gangwon FC (1) | 0–0 (a.e.t.); 4–3 (p) | Seongnam FC (2) |
| Busan IPark (2) | 0–0 (a.e.t.); 3–5 (p) | Bucheon FC 1995 (1) |
