= 2025 K4 League =

6th season of the K4 League, a semi-professional league in South Korea

K4 League
- Season: 2025
- Dates: 22 February – 15 November 2025
- Champions: Dangjin Citizen (1st title)
- Promoted: Dangjin Citizen
- Best Player: Shin Jae-wook
- Top goalscorer: Gu Hyun-woo (20 goals)

The 2025 K4 League is the sixth season of the semi-professional K4 League, the fourth-highest league of men's football in South Korea.

This season was their last season at semi-professional leagues.

== Competition format ==
The pre-season winter transfer window opened between 1 January and 24 March 2025, and the summer transfer window opened between 20 June and 31 July 2025.

Prior to the 2025 season, the size of each matchday squad increased from 18 to 20 players, following the rule of the K League. Among them, three or more players had to be under-23 Koreans, with one included in the starting line-up. The AFC player quota was removed, and participating teams could include four foreign players of any nationality.

The 2025 season consisted of 33 rounds with each team playing 30 matches. The champions were directly promoted to the K3 League, and the runners-up qualified for the promotion play-off where they played the lowest-ranked team of the 2025 K3 League.

== Teams ==
=== Team changes ===
Jeonju Citizen suspended their participation due to financial issues. Seoul Nowon United also suspended their participation after failing to extend the contract with Nowon Madeul Stadium. The two teams eventually decided to be disbanded.

FC Sejong were forced out of the K4 League due to issues about their management. They moved to Malaysia with renamed Seoul Phoenix, and were replaced by Sejong SA.

Relegated from K3 League

- Daegu FC B

Newly joined

- Gijang United
- Sejong SA

Promoted to K3 League

- Jeonbuk Hyundai Motors N

Withdrawn

- Daejeon Hana Citizen B
- FC Sejong
- Jeonju Citizen
- Seoul Nowon United

=== Stadiums and locations ===
Locations of the 2025 K4 League teams

A total of eleven teams participated in the 2025 season. FC Chungju relocated to Yeoncheon and changed their name to Yeoncheon FC.

| Team | City | Stadium | Capacity |
|---|---|---|---|
| Daegu FC B | Daegu | Daegu World Cup Stadium | 2,500 |
| Dangjin Citizen | Dangjin | Dangjin Sports Complex | 66,422 |
| Geoje Citizen | Geoje | Geoje Sports Park | 3,000 |
| Gijang United | Gijang | Jeonggwan Sports Healing Park | 2,200 |
| Jinju Citizen | Jinju | Jinju Sports Complex; Modeok Sports Park | 20,116 ? |
| Namyangju FC | Namyangju | Namyangju Sports Complex | 2,901 |
| Pyeongchang United | Pyeongchang | Jinbu Sports Park | 300 |
| Pyeongtaek Citizen | Pyeongtaek | Sosabug Sports Town | 12,738 |
| Sejong SA | Sejong | Sejong Citizen's Stadium | 996 |
| Seoul Jungnang | Seoul | Jungnang District Field | 400 |
| Yeoncheon FC | Yeoncheon | Yeoncheon Sports Complex | 9,000 |

== Season overview ==
Namyangju FC and Pyeongchang United recruited South Korea internationals Suk Hyun-jun and Hwang Mun-ki as social service personnels respectively.

Ghanaian Isaac Osei and Brazilian Roberto Henrique played for Daegu FC B and Sejong SA respectively, becoming the only two foreign players of this season. Osei was also known as one of the first two homegrown players at the K League.

Seoul Jungnang earned only one win in the first half of the season. They had the possibility of gaining their second win after defeating Pyeongtaek Citizen 5–3 in their ninth match (on the tenth matchday), but forfeited the match by using an unauthorized player. They also forfeited the previous match, which ended in a goalless draw with Gijang United, due to the same resaon.

Namyangju FC started the season well, earning six wins without a defeat in the first nine matches. Pyeongchang United also showed good start, not losing in the first eight matches. The two clubs showed a very close race in the upper ranks until the last matchday, but conceded the title to Dangjin Citizen. Especially, Namyangju lost the title on goal difference after losing the last match despite Dangjin's defeat at the same time. Afterwards, Namyangju falied to be promoted to the K3 League by losing 1–0 to FC Mokpo at the promotion play-off.

== League table ==
| Pos | Team | Pld | W | D | L | GF | GA | GD | Pts | Promotion |
|---|---|---|---|---|---|---|---|---|---|---|
| 1 | Dangjin Citizen (C, P) | 30 | 16 | 3 | 11 | 72 | 54 | +18 | 51 | Promotion to 2026 K3 League |
| 2 | Namyangju FC | 30 | 15 | 6 | 9 | 47 | 33 | +14 | 51 | Qualification for promotion play-off |
| 3 | Pyeongchang United | 30 | 13 | 10 | 7 | 49 | 38 | +11 | 49 | |
| 4 | Jinju Citizen | 30 | 14 | 7 | 9 | 55 | 48 | +7 | 49 | |
| 5 | Gijang United | 30 | 15 | 4 | 11 | 45 | 40 | +5 | 49 | |
| 6 | Geoje Citizen | 30 | 14 | 6 | 10 | 63 | 49 | +14 | 48 | |
| 7 | Daegu FC B | 30 | 13 | 9 | 8 | 44 | 30 | +14 | 48 | |
| 8 | Yeoncheon FC | 30 | 10 | 7 | 13 | 39 | 61 | −22 | 37 | |
| 9 | Pyeongtaek Citizen | 30 | 8 | 8 | 14 | 46 | 64 | −18 | 32 | |
| 10 | Sejong SA | 30 | 7 | 8 | 15 | 45 | 56 | −11 | 29 | |
| 11 | Seoul Jungnang | 30 | 4 | 4 | 22 | 44 | 76 | −32 | 16 | |

Source: JoinKFA Soccerway
Rules for classification: 1) Points; 2) Goal difference; 3) Goals scored; 4) Wins
(C) Champions; (P) Promoted

== Results ==
=== Matches 1–20 ===
| Home \ Away | DJC | DGB | GJC | GJU | JJC | NYJ | PCU | PTC | SJS | SJN | YC |
|---|---|---|---|---|---|---|---|---|---|---|---|
| Dangjin Citizen | — | 2–1 | 4–2 | 2–1 | 5–2 | 0–1 | 0–1 | 8–0 | 1–0 | 4–2 | 3–0 |
| Daegu FC B | 1–2 | — | 0–1 | 1–0 | 2–1 | 3–0 | 1–1 | 0–0 | 2–2 | 3–0 | 2–2 |
| Geoje Citizen | 4–1 | 1–1 | — | 0–0 | 2–2 | 1–3 | 5–0 | 3–1 | 2–2 | 4–2 | 1–0 |
| Gijang United | 3–2 | 0–3 | 1–2 | — | 1–3 | 0–3 | 1–0 | 6–3 | 1–1 | 1–0 | 3–1 |
| Jinju Citizen | 3–3 | 1–1 | 3–2 | 1–0 | — | 0–2 | 1–1 | 1–1 | 2–1 | 0–2 | 3–0 |
| Namyangju FC | 3–0 | 1–2 | 4–3 | 0–1 | 2–0 | — | 2–1 | 0–0 | 2–1 | 3–2 | 3–0 |
| Pyeongchang United | 1–4 | 1–0 | 1–1 | 1–0 | 4–1 | 1–1 | — | 3–0 | 1–1 | 2–1 | 1–1 |
| Pyeongtaek Citizen | 3–5 | 0–1 | 2–1 | 2–1 | 0–2 | 0–1 | 2–4 | — | 3–2 | 3–0 (Note: KFA awarded Pyeongtaek Citizen a 3–0 win as a result of Seoul Jungnang fielding an ineligible player.) | 1–1 |
| Sejong SA | 4–2 | 1–3 | 2–0 | 1–3 | 1–2 | 1–0 | 1–2 | 2–3 | — | 2–1 | 2–3 |
| Seoul Jungnang | 3–2 | 0–1 | 1–4 | 0–3 (Note: KFA awarded Gijang United a 3–0 win as a result of Seoul Jungnang fielding an ineligible player.) | 2–4 | 0–1 | 1–1 | 1–1 | 2–2 | — | 2–3 |
| Yeoncheon FC | 0–3 | 2–1 | 1–1 | 0–0 | 4–1 | 0–0 | 0–5 | 1–2 | 3–2 | 4–3 | — |

Updated to match(es) played on unknown. Source: JoinKFA Soccerway
Legend: Blue = home team win; Yellow = draw; Red = away team win.

=== Matches 21–30 ===
| Home \ Away | DJC | DGB | GJC | GJU | JJC | NYJ | PCU | PTC | SJS | SJN | YC |
|---|---|---|---|---|---|---|---|---|---|---|---|
| Dangjin Citizen | — | — | — | 3–3 | — | 2–0 | — | — | 4–0 | — | 4–1 |
| Daegu FC B | 4–0 | — | — | 2–1 | — | 0–0 | — | — | — | 2–0 | 2–0 |
| Geoje Citizen | 2–0 | 3–1 | — | 2–3 | — | — | — | — | 1–0 | — | 2–3 |
| Gijang United | — | — | 1–0 | — | 1–0 | 3–2 | — | — | 0–3 | — | 3–0 |
| Jinju Citizen | 4–1 | 3–2 | 1–3 | — | — | — | — | 4–1 | — | 5–3 | — |
| Namyangju FC | — | — | 2–3 | — | 0–0 | — | 0–0 | 5–7 | 4–0 | — | — |
| Pyeongchang United | 1–1 | 2–0 | — | 3–2 | 0–2 | — | — | — | — | 5–2 | — |
| Pyeongtaek Citizen | 0–2 | 0–1 | 1–2 | 1–2 | — | — | — | — | — | — | — |
| Sejong SA | — | 1–1 | 4–3 | — | 0–0 | — | 1–3 | 0–0 | — | — | 1–2 |
| Seoul Jungnang | 4–2 | — | — | 1–2 | — | 1–2 | — | — | 1–4 | — | 4–0 |
| Yeoncheon FC | — | — | — | — | 1–3 | 1–0 | 3–1 | 2–2 | 3–2 | — | — |

Source: JoinKFA Soccerway
Legend: Blue = home team win; Yellow = draw; Red = away team win.

== Promotion play-off ==
The promotion play-off was contested between the 15th-placed team of K3 League and the runners-up of K4 League.

22 November 2025
14:00 (UTC+9)

| FC Mokpo | 1–0 | Namyangju FC |
|---|---|---|
| Ryu Yeon-joon 63' | Report |

Mokpo International Football Center, Mokpo

== Statistics ==
=== Top scorers ===
| Rank | Player | Club | Goals |
|---|---|---|---|
| 1 | (South Korea) Gu Hyun-woo | Dangjin Citizen | 20 |
| 2 | (South Korea) Ko Byung-beom | Pyeongtaek Citizen | 15 |
| 3 | (South Korea) Lee Dong-jin | Sejong SA | 15 |
| 4 | (South Korea) Kim Su-seong | Pyeongchang United | 13 |
| 5 | (South Korea) Kim Gyeong-gu | Geoje Citizen | 12 |

==== Hat-tricks ====
| Player | For | Against | Result | Date |
|---|---|---|---|---|
| (South Korea) Kim Hye-seong | Dangjin Citizen | Pyeongtaek Citizen | 8–0 (H) | 24 May 2025 |
| (South Korea) Kim Hong | Dangjin Citizen | Seoul Jungnang | 4–2 (H) | 6 July 2025 |
| (South Korea) Gu Hyun-woo | Dangjin Citizen | Sejong SA | 4–0 (H) | 23 August 2025 |
| (South Korea) Lee Dong-jin | Sejong SA | Seoul Jungnang | 1–4 (A) | 6 September 2025 |
| (South Korea) Ahn Jun-hyeok | Seoul Jungnang | Dangjin Citizen | 4–2 (H) | 15 November 2025 |

=== Most assists ===
| Rank | Player | Club | Assists |
|---|---|---|---|
| 1 | (South Korea) Park Yo-han | Pyeongchang United | 16 |
| 2 | (South Korea) Jeong Hyun-woo | Pyeongtaek Citizen | 10 |
| 3 | (South Korea) Park Kyong-min | Jinju Citizen | 9 |
| 4 | (South Korea) Kim Jae-cheol | Sejong SA | 7 |
| 4 | (South Korea) Seo Gyeong-ju | Dangjin Citizen | 7 |

=== Clean sheets ===
| Rank | Player | Club | Clean sheets |
|---|---|---|---|
| 1 | (South Korea) Park Han-geun | Namyangju FC | 9 |
| 1 | (South Korea) Kim Min-geun | Gijang United | 9 |
| 4 | (South Korea) Yoo Jong-min | Pyeongchang United | 6 |
| 4 | (South Korea) Lee Tae-hee | Geoje Citizen | 6 |
| 4 | (South Korea) Kim Won-jeong | Jinju Citizen | 6 |

=== Discipline ===
==== Player ====
- Most yellow cards: 10
  - (South Korea) Lee Si-hun (Yeoncheon FC)
- Most red cards: 1
  - (South Korea) Lee Hyeon-jo (Pyeongchang United)
  - (South Korea) Gang Seong-yun (Pyeongtaek Citizen)
  - (South Korea) Kim Woo-jin (Pyeongtaek Citizen)
  - (South Korea) Park Jin-bae (Gijang United)
  - (South Korea) Lee Je-wook (Daegu FC B)
  - (South Korea) Shim Min (Sejong SA)
  - (South Korea) Oh Chang-gwon (Sejong SA)
  - (South Korea) Ma Ji-gang (Sejong SA)
  - (South Korea) Kim Jae-bong (Seoul Jungnang)
  - (South Korea) Park Jae-woo (Jinju Citizen)
  - (South Korea) Kim Yun-hyeon (Yeoncheon FC)

==== Club ====
- Most yellow cards: 57
  - Yeoncheon FC
- Fewest yellow cards: 34
  - Namyangju FC
- Most red cards: 6
  - Pyeongcaek Citizen
- Most straight red cards: 3
  - Sejong SA
- Fewest red cards: 0
  - Geoje Citizen
  - Dangjin Citizen

== See also ==
- 2025 in South Korean football
- 2025 K3 League
- 2025 Korea Cup
