= 2023 K3 League =

K3 League
- Season: 2023
- Dates: 11 March – 11 November 2023
- Champions: Hwaseong FC (1st title)
- Relegated: Yangju Citizen
- Best Player: Jegal Jae-min
- Top goalscorer: Jegal Jae-min; Woo Jae-wook (12 goals each)

The 2023 K3 League was the fourth season of the K3 League as a semi-professional league in South Korea. Its regular season was held from 11 March to 11 November 2023.

The 15 participating teams played each other twice. The 14th-placed team advanced to the relegation play-off and the bottom team was directly relegated to the K4 League.

== Teams ==
=== Team changes ===
Promoted from K4 League

- Yangpyeong FC
- Chuncheon Citizen

Promoted to K League 2

- Cheonan City
- Cheongju FC (renamed Chungbuk Cheongju)

Relegated to K4 League

- Dangjin Citizen

=== Locations ===
Locations of the 2023 K3 League teams

Club	City
Busan Transportation Corporation	Busan
Changwon City	Changwon
Chuncheon Citizen	Chuncheon
Daejeon Korail	Daejeon
FC Mokpo	Mokpo
Gangneung Citizen	Gangneung
Gimhae FC	Gimhae
Gyeongju KHNP	Gyeongju
Hwaseong FC	Hwaseong
Paju Citizen	Paju
Pocheon Citizen	Pocheon
Siheung Citizen	Siheung
Ulsan Citizen	Ulsan
Yangju Citizen	Yangju
Yangpyeong FC	Yangpyeong

=== Stadiums ===
Club	Stadium	Capacity
Busan Transportation Corporation	Busan Asiad Auxiliary Stadium	?
Changwon City	Changwon Football Center	15,116
Chuncheon Citizen	Chuncheon Songam Sports Town-Auxiliary Stadium	25,000
Daejeon Korail	Daejeon World Cup Stadium Practice Pitch	17,371
FC Mokpo	Mokpo International Football Center	5,952
Gangneung Citizen	Gangneung Stadium	33,000
Gimhae FC	Gimhae Public Stadium	25,000
Gyeongju KHNP	Gyeongju Civic Stadium	12,199
Hwaseong FC	Hwaseong Stadium	35,270
Paju Citizen	Paju Public Stadium	23,000
Pocheon Citizen	Pocheon Stadium	7,000
Siheung Citizen	Jeongwang Sports Park	1,500
Ulsan Citizen	Ulsan Stadium	19,471
Yangju Citizen	Godeok Artificial Turf Ground	5,000
Yangpyeong FC	Yangpyeong Sports Complex	3,000

=== Personnel ===
Club	Manager
Busan Transportation Corporation	(South Korea) Kim Gwi-hwa
Changwon City	(South Korea) Choi Kyeong-don
Chuncheon Citizen	(South Korea) Son Hyun-jun
Daejeon Korail	(South Korea) Kim Seung-hee
FC Mokpo	(South Korea) Jeong Hyun-ho
Gangneung Citizen	(South Korea) Kim Do-keun
Gimhae FC	(South Korea) Yoon Sung-hyo
Gyeongju KHNP	(South Korea) Seo Bo-won
Hwaseong FC	(South Korea) Kang Chul
Paju Citizen	(South Korea) Lee Eun-no
Pocheon Citizen	(South Korea) Cho Man-geun
Siheung Citizen	(South Korea) Park Seung-soo
Ulsan Citizen	(South Korea) Yoon Kyung-sang
Yangju Citizen	(South Korea) Park Sung-bae
Yangpyeong FC	(South Korea) Kim Chang-yoon

=== Foreign players ===
Restricting the number of foreign players strictly to four per team, including a slot for a player from the AFC countries. A team could use four foreign players on the field each game, including at least one player from the AFC.

The name in bold indicates that the player was registered during the mid-season transfer window.

Club	Player 1	Player 2	Player 3	AFC player	Former players
Changwon City	(Brazil) Victor Ribeiro				
FC Mokpo					(Japan) Tatsuro Nagamatsu
Gangneung Citizen	(Brazil) Jordan Rodrigues	(Brazil) **Careca**			(Brazil) Douglas Matheus
Gimhae FC					(Brazil) Matheus Matias
Gyeongju KHNP	(Japan) Reo Nishiguchi	(Brazil) **Leonardo Kalil**	(Brazil) **João Leonardo**	(Japan) Hayata Komatsu	
Hwaseong FC	(Brazil) Luan Costa	(Brazil) Sandy	(Brazil) Caio Marcelo	(Japan) Yuki Aizu	

== League table ==
Pos	Team	Pld	W	D	L	GF	GA	GD	Pts	Qualification or relegation
1	Hwaseong FC (C)	28	17	9	2	42	21	+21	60	
2	FC Mokpo	28	15	8	5	48	26	+22	53	
3	Gimhae FC	28	13	10	5	42	26	+16	49	
4	Ulsan Citizen	28	13	8	7	36	29	+7	47	
5	Daejeon Korail	28	11	6	11	34	32	+2	39	
6	Siheung Citizen	28	10	9	9	37	36	+1	39	
7	Paju Citizen	28	11	5	12	32	27	+5	38	
8	Chuncheon Citizen	28	9	11	8	25	26	−1	38	
9	Busan Transportation Corporation	28	9	7	12	34	36	−2	34	
10	Gyeongju KHNP	28	8	10	10	28	32	−4	34	
11	Pocheon Citizen	28	7	12	9	26	33	−7	33	
12	Gangneung Citizen	28	8	8	12	27	35	−8	32	
13	Yangpyeong FC	28	7	6	15	28	43	−15	27	
14	Changwon City (O)	28	7	6	15	23	39	−16	27	Qualification for relegation play-off
15	Yangju Citizen (R)	28	4	7	17	29	50	−21	19	Relegation to K4 League

Source: JoinKFA Livesport
Rules for classification: 1) Points; 2) Goal difference; 3) Goals scored; 4) Wins
(C) Champions; (O) Play-off winners; (R) Relegated

== Results ==
Home \ Away	BTC	CHA	CHU	DKO	GNE	GIH	GYE	HWA	MOK	PJC	POC	SIH	ULS	YJU	YPY
Busan Transportation Corporation	—	0–1	1–1	1–1	0–1	1–2	2–2	1–1	0–2	0–1	2–2	1–0	1–1	2–1	4–0
Changwon City	1–2	—	0–1	2–4	1–2	3–2	0–0	1–2	2–0	0–0	0–0	1–0	1–2	1–2	1–0
Chuncheon Citizen	1–0	2–1	—	1–0	0–2	1–3	0–0	1–1	0–1	1–0	1–1	1–1	0–0	2–1	2–1
Daejeon Korail	1–0	2–1	1–0	—	0–0	2–2	0–0	0–1	3–1	1–0	0–1	1–1	1–2	2–1	2–0
Gangneung City	2–3	0–1	1–2	2–2	—	0–5	1–1	0–0	1–0	0–1	3–3	0–0	1–2	1–0	1–1
Gimhae FC	2–1	2–2	0–0	2–0	3–2	—	0–1	2–2	1–0	0–1	2–0	0–0	2–2	0–0	1–0
Gyeongju KHNP	3–1	3–0	1–0	0–2	0–1	2–4	—	0–1	0–0	1–1	1–3	3–1	0–0	4–3	0–1
Hwaseong FC	2–1	1–0	2–1	2–1	3–0	0–0	1–1	—	0–4	0–0	0–0	2–0	1–1	3–0	3–1
FC Mokpo	2–0	4–0	3–3	2–1	2–2	1–1	1–1	1–2	—	0–0	2–1	4–3	3–0	1–0	2–0
Paju Citizen	0–1	1–2	0–1	1–0	1–0	1–2	4–0	2–1	0–1	—	3–1	0–1	2–0	4–0	4–2
Pocheon Citizen	2–1	0–0	0–0	0–2	0–2	0–0	1–0	1–3	2–2	1–0	—	0–0	2–3	1–0	1–2
Siheung Citizen	1–2	1–0	2–2	4–2	1–0	2–1	2–1	0–2	0–2	4–2	0–0	—	1–2	3–2	4–2
Ulsan Citizen	1–3	3–0	1–0	2–1	0–1	1–0	2–1	0–1	1–1	3–0	0–1	0–2	—	4–2	0–0
Yangju Citizen	1–1	1–1	1–1	1–2	2–1	0–0	0–1	1–2	2–4	3–2	1–1	1–1	0–2	—	2–2
Yangpyeong FC	1–2	2–0	1–0	2–0	1–0	1–2	0–1	1–3	0–2	1–1	3–1	2–2	1–1	0–1	—

Source: JoinKFA Livesport
Legend: Blue = home team win; Yellow = draw; Red = away team win.

== Relegation play-off ==
The relegation play-off (K4 League promotion play-offs final) was contested between the 14th-placed team of K3 League and the winners of K4 League play-off (semi-final).

25 November 2023
14:00 (UTC+9)

Changwon City	2–0	Jinju Citizen
Seong Bong-jae 53', 82'	Report

Changwon Stadium, Changwon

== See also ==
- 2023 in South Korean football
- 2023 Korean FA Cup
