= Choi Chul-soon =

South Korean footballer (born 1987)

Choi Chul-soon 최철순
Personal information
- Full name: Choi Chul-soon
- Date of birth: February 8, 1987 (age 39)
- Place of birth: Seoul, South Korea
- Height: 1.75 m (5 ft 9 in)
- Position: Right back

Team information
- Current team: Jeonbuk Hyundai Motors
- Number: 25

Youth career
- Chungbuk National University

Senior career*
Years	Team	Apps	(Gls)
2006–2025	Jeonbuk Hyundai Motors	374	(2)
2012–2014	→ Sangju Sangmu (draft)	43	(1)
2022–2025	Jeonbuk Hyundai Motors B	26	(1)

International career^{‡}
2005–2007	South Korea U-20	15	(0)
2007–2008	South Korea U-23	6	(0)
2010–2018	South Korea	11	(0)
- * Club domestic league appearances and goals as of 30 November 2025 ‡ National team caps and goals as of 27 March 2018

- Choi Chul-soon
- Hangul: 최철순
- Hanja: 崔喆淳
- RR: Choe Cheolsun
- MR: Ch'oe Ch'ŏlsun

Choi Chul-soon (Korean: 최철순, Korean pronunciation: [tɕʰwe̞.tɕʰʌl.s͈un]; born February 8, 1987) is a South Korean footballer who plays as a right back for Jeonbuk Hyundai Motors. He has previously played for the Korean national U-23 football team which is also known as the Olympic National Team.

He was a member of the Korean national U-20 football team for the 2007 FIFA U-20 World Cup in Canada as a central defender and was also a member of Korean National U-19 Football Team for 2006 AFC Youth Championship in India. However, he has been a fullback since Korean national U-23 football team.

On 9 January 2010, Choi made his first international cap for South Korea at the friendly match against Zambia.

== Early life ==
Choi was born in Seoul. He studied at Chungbuk National University.

== Career ==
Choi went on loan to Sangju in 2012.

On November 30, 2025, he played his retirement game. His uniform number 25 was designated as a permanent number.

== Club career statistics ==
As of 6 December 2025

Club	Season	League			KFA Cup		League Cup		Continental		Other		Total	
Club	Season	Division	Apps	Goals	Apps	Goals	Apps	Goals	Apps	Goals	Apps	Goals	Apps	Goals
Jeonbuk Hyundai Motors	2006	K League 1	12	0	1	0	11	0	8 (Note: Appearances in AFC Champions League)	0	1 (Note: Appearances in FIFA Club World Cup)	0	33	0
Jeonbuk Hyundai Motors	2007	K League 1	15	0	0	0	4	0	2	0	—		21	0
Jeonbuk Hyundai Motors	2008	K League 1	25	0	1	0	9	0	—		2 (Note: Appearances in K League Championship)	0	37	0
Jeonbuk Hyundai Motors	2009	K League 1	21	0	2	0	4	0	—		2	0	29	0
Jeonbuk Hyundai Motors	2010	K League 1	17	0	0	0	1	0	3	0	3	0	24	0
Jeonbuk Hyundai Motors	2011	K League 1	21	1	1	0	0	0	8	0	2	0	32	1
Jeonbuk Hyundai Motors	2012	K League 1	12	0	2	0	—		5	0	—		19	0
Jeonbuk Hyundai Motors	2014	K League 1	30	0	2	0	—		—		—		32	0
Jeonbuk Hyundai Motors	2015	K League 1	29	0	0	0	—		5	0	—		34	0
Jeonbuk Hyundai Motors	2016	K League 1	30	1	0	0	—		10	0	2	0	42	1
Jeonbuk Hyundai Motors	2017	K League 1	35	0	1	0	—		—		—		36	0
Jeonbuk Hyundai Motors	2018	K League 1	28	0	1	0	—		7	0	—		36	0
Jeonbuk Hyundai Motors	2019	K League 1	18	0	1	0	—		5	0	—		24	0
Jeonbuk Hyundai Motors	2020	K League 1	13	0	5	0	—		5	0	—		23	0
Jeonbuk Hyundai Motors	2021	K League 1	18	0	1	0	—		1	0	—		20	0
Jeonbuk Hyundai Motors	2022	K League 1	17	0	2	0	—		2	0	—		21	0
Jeonbuk Hyundai Motors	2023	K League 1	19	0	2	0	—		3	0	—		24	0
Jeonbuk Hyundai Motors	2024	K League 1	5	0	1	0	—		4 (Note: Appearances in AFC Champions League Two)	0	—		10	0
Jeonbuk Hyundai Motors	2025	K League 1	9	0	4	0	—		3	0	—		16	0
Jeonbuk Hyundai Motors	Total		374	2	27	0	29	0	71	0	12	0	513	2
Sangju Sangmu (draft)	2012	K League 1	10	1	0	0	—		—		—		10	1
Sangju Sangmu (draft)	2013	K League 2	29	0	1	0	—		—		2 (Note: Appearance in K League promotion-relegation play-offs)	0	32	0
Sangju Sangmu (draft)	2014	K League 1	4	0	0	0	—		—		—		4	0
Sangju Sangmu (draft)	Total		43	1	1	0	—		—		2	0	46	1
Jeonbuk Hyundai Motors B	2022	K4 League	6	0	—		—		—		—		6	0
Jeonbuk Hyundai Motors B	2023	K4 League	5	1	—		—		—		—		5	1
Jeonbuk Hyundai Motors B	2024	K4 League	7	0	—		—		—		—		7	0
Jeonbuk Hyundai Motors B	2025	K3 League	8	0	—		—		—		—		8	0
Jeonbuk Hyundai Motors B	Total		26	1	—		—		—		—		26	1
Career total			443	4	28	0	29	0	71	0	14	0	585	4

== Honours ==
=== Club ===
Jeonbuk Hyundai Motors

- AFC Champions League (2) : 2006, 2016
- K League 1 (10) : 2009, 2011, 2014, 2015, 2017, 2018, 2019, 2020, 2021, 2025
- Korean FA Cup (3) : 2020, 2022, 2025

Sangju Sangmu

- K League 2 : 2013

Jeonbuk Hyundai Motors B

- K4 League : 2024

=== International ===
South Korea

- EAFF East Asian Cup : 2017

=== Individual ===
- K League 1 Best XI (2) : 2011, 2017
- K League 2 Best XI : 2013
