= Geoje Citizen FC =

South Korean football club

Geoje Citizen FC 거제 시민 FC
- Full name: Geoje Citizen Football Club 거제 시민축구단
- Short name: Geoje Citizen
- Founded: November 6, 2020; 5 years ago
- Ground: Geoje Sports Complex
- Capacity: 3000
- Owner: Park Jong-woo
- Chairman: Kim Jong-un
- Manager: Song Hong-sub
- League: K4 League
- Website: 거제시민축구단.kr
Home colours	Away colours

Geoje Citizen FC (Korean: 거제 시민축구단) is a semi-professional South Korean football club based in Geoje, South Gyeongsang Province. The club was founded in 2020 and plays in the K4 League, the fourth tier of football in South Korea.

== History ==
During the 2018 local elections, Geoje mayoral candidates Byun Kwang-yong and Seo Il-jun both pledged to establish a semi-professional football team in the city in order to foster local talent and boost the local economy. In 2020, Geoje City formally announced its plan to establish the team by the end of the year, contributing 200 million won towards its foundation, with another 100 million won coming from the Korea Football Association. The club was established as an independent not-for-profit organisation and local citizens were invited to participate in its establishment and operation. In summer 2020, the board of directors appointed former Ajou University and Geoje High School coach Song Jae-gyu as the club's first manager.

Ahead of their K4 League debut in 2021, the team stated its aim not only to win the championship in their first year, but also to turn professional and join K League 2 as soon as possible under the slogan "Together, we make history". Following a series of pre-season friendlies, they played their first ever league match at home against Siheung Citizen FC, resulting in a 1-2 loss, in front of a crowd of over 1000 spectators including Geoje mayor Byun Kwang-yong. They had a slow start to the season, achieving their first win away against Chuncheon Citizen in the seventh round of the competition. They eventually finished the season in sixth place.

In 2022, ahead of their second league season, Geoje again announced their ambition to achieve promotion to the K3 League. The club signed a number of players with professional experience, including Kim Chang-dae, a midfielder who had been named in the 2021 K3 League's 'Best 11'. In spite of this, they had a disappointing start to the season with a 5-0 loss against Daejeon Korail in their first ever appearance in the Korean FA Cup, and back-to-back draws in their first two league games, recording their first win against Seoul Nowon United in the third round. This comparatively early win gave Geoje hope of a better overall performance than their debut season, but they finished the season eighth in the table, with only a 2-2 draw in the final round saving them from a ninth place finish.

Geoje Citizen enjoyed a more successful season in 2023. They reached the third round of the FA Cup after beating K3 teams Yangpyeong FC and Gyeongju KHNP in the first and second rounds respectively. They were knocked out in the third round following a 4-1 defeat to K League 1 side Daejeon Hana Citizen. Their league campaign also started positively, with a win in the second round in front of a record home crowd of 1,482 spectators. Following a series of strong performances, Geoje were only one point away from the top of the table in the middle of the season with the prospect of automatic promotion if they could retain their position. By the later stages of the competition, they found themselves vying with Jinju Citizen and Pyeongchang United to secure a top four finish and a place in the promotion play-offs. Geoje finished the regular season in third place but lost to fourth-placed Jinju 4-1 in the playoff, consigning themselves to at least another year in the fourth division.

Following Song Jae-gyu's resignation in 2023, Song Hong-sub was promoted from head coach to become the team's new manager.

== Season-by-season records ==
Season	Tier	Regular season	Playoffs	Pld	W	D	L	GF	GA	GD	Pts	FA Cup	Manager	Source(s)
2021	K4 League	6th	—	30	13	8	9	50	39	+11	47	—	(South Korea) Song Jae-gyu	
2022	K4 League	8th	—	32	13	7	12	46	47	-1	46	First round	(South Korea) Song Jae-gyu	
2023	K4 League	3rd	4th	30	15	8	7	64	37	+27	53	Third round	(South Korea) Song Jae-gyu	
2024	K4 League	8th	—	24	9	7	8	38	47	-9	34	Second round	(South Korea) Song Hong-sub	
2025	K4 League	6th	—	30	14	6	10	63	49	-14	48			

== See also ==
- List of football clubs in South Korea
