= 2022 K4 League =

K4 League
- Season: 2022
- Dates: 26 February – 29 October 2022
- Champions: Goyang KH (1st title)
- Promoted: Yangpyeong FC; Chuncheon Citizen
- Matches played: 806
- Goals scored: 272 (0.34 per match)
- Best Player: Kim Woon
- Top goalscorer: Park Dae-hoon (20 goals)

The 2022 K4 League was the third season of the K4 League.

Defending champions Pocheon Citizen were promoted to the K3 League alongside runners-up Siheung Citizen and play-off winners Dangjin Citizen, while Pyeongtaek Citizen played in the K4 League for the first time by being relegated from the K3 League. Three K League clubs Daegu FC, Daejeon Hana Citizen and Jeonbuk Hyundai Motors joined the K4 League, and entered with their reserve teams.

The 17 participating teams played each other twice during the regular season. The top two teams could be directly promoted to the K3 League, and the third and fourth-placed teams qualified for the promotion play-offs.

Yangpyeong FC, FC Namdong and Chungju Citizen forfeited three, seven and twelve matches respectively due to their use of illegal players. Additionally, FC Namdong forfeited seven more matches by being disbanded in the middle of the season.

Goyang KH qualified for the K3 League as champions, but they were disbanded after the end of the season.

== Teams ==
=== Team changes ===
Relegated from K3 League

- Pyeongtaek Citizen

Newly joined

- Daegu FC B
- Daejeon Hana Citizen B
- Jeonbuk Hyundai Motors B

Promoted to K3 League

- Pocheon Citizen
- Siheung Citizen
- Dangjin Citizen

=== Stadiums and locations ===
Club	City	Stadium	Capacity
Chuncheon Citizen	Chuncheon	Chuncheon Songam Sports Town Auxiliary Stadium	25,000
Chungju Citizen	Chungju	Chungju Tangeum Stadium	3,000
FC Namdong	Incheon	Namdong Industrial Complex Park	2,500
Daegu FC B	Daegu	Daegu Stadium	66,422
Daejeon Hana Citizen B	Daejeon	Daejeon World Cup Stadium Auxiliary Stadium	
Gangwon FC B	Gangwon	Chuncheon Songam Stadium	20,000
Geoje Citizen	Geoje	Geoje Stadium	7,500
Goyang KH	Goyang	Goyang Stadium	41,311
Jeonbuk Hyundai Motors B	Jeonju	Jeonju World Cup Stadium Auxiliary Stadium	
Jeonju Citizen	Jeonju	Jeonju Stadium	30,000
Jinju Citizen	Jinju	Jinju Stadium	20,116
Pyeongchang United	Pyeongchang	Jinbu Sports Park	300
Pyeongtaek Citizen	Pyeongtaek	Sosabeol Reports Town	15,000
Seoul Jungnang	Seoul	Jungnang Public Ground	400
Seoul Nowon United	Seoul	Nowon Madeul Stadium	446
Yangpyeong FC	Yangpyeong	Yongmun Sports Park	3,000
Yeoju FC	Yeoju	Yeoju Stadium	16,000

=== Personnel ===
Club	Manager
Chuncheon Citizen	(South Korea) Son Hyun-jun
Chungju Citizen	(South Korea) Gong Mun-bae
FC Namdong	(South Korea) Kim Jeong-jae
Daegu FC B	
Daejeon Hana Citizen B	
Gangwon FC B	(South Korea) Lee Seul-gi
Geoje Citizen	(South Korea) Song Jae-gyu
Goyang KH	(South Korea) Bae Seong-jae
Jeonbuk Hyundai Motors B	(South Korea) Park Jun-sub
Jeonju Citizen	(South Korea) Yang Young-cheol
Jinju Citizen	(South Korea) Choi Cheong-il
Pyeongchang United	(South Korea) An Hong-min
Pyeongtaek Citizen	(South Korea) Lee Ho-joon
Seoul Jungnang	(South Korea) Kim Sang-hwa
Seoul Nowon United	(South Korea) Lee Jeong-jae
Yangpyeong FC	(South Korea) Kim Chang-yoon
Yeoju FC	(South Korea) Shim Bong-seop

== League table ==
Pos	Team	Pld	W	D	L	GF	GA	GD	Pts	Qualification
1	Goyang KH (Note: Dissolved after the end of the season.) (C)	32	22	2	8	71	40	+31	68	
2	Yangpyeong FC (P)	32	19	7	6	49	30	+19	64	Promotion to K3 League
3	Chuncheon Citizen (O, P)	32	18	7	7	55	31	+24	61	Qualification for promotion play-offs
4	Pyeongchang United	32	17	4	11	47	40	+7	55	Qualification for promotion play-offs
5	Daejeon Hana Citizen B	32	16	3	13	60	56	+4	51	
6	Gangwon FC B	32	15	5	12	49	32	+17	50	
7	Seoul Nowon United	32	15	4	13	56	45	+11	49	
8	Geoje Citizen	32	13	7	12	44	45	−1	46	
9	Jeonju Citizen	32	13	7	12	53	55	−2	46	
10	Jeonbuk Hyundai Motors B	32	13	6	13	56	52	+4	45	
11	Jinju Citizen	32	12	7	13	42	47	−5	43	
12	Daegu FC B	32	9	10	13	42	44	−2	37	
13	Seoul Jungnang	32	11	4	17	38	46	−8	37	
14	Pyeongtaek Citizen	32	9	7	16	42	54	−12	34	
15	Chungju Citizen	32	9	2	21	33	65	−32	29	
16	Yeoju FC	32	8	3	21	36	57	−21	27	
17	FC Namdong	32	7	5	20	29	69	−40	26	Withdrawal (Note: Dissolved with 7 matches left.)

Source: Soccerway JoinKFA
Rules for classification: 1) Points; 2) Goal difference; 3) Head-to-head points; 4) Goals scored; 5) Wins
(C) Champions; (O) Play-off winners; (P) Promoted

== Results ==
Home \ Away	CHU	CHC	DGU	DJN	GWO	GEO	JBK	GYK	JEO	JIN	NAM	PCH	PTA	SJN	SNU	YPY	YEO
Chuncheon Citizen	—	2–1	0–2	2–1	3–0	2–0	2–1	2–1	3–0	1–1	3–0	0–1	1–1	1–0	1–2	0–1	0–0
Chungju Citizen	2–2	—	0–3	1–4	3–1	1–2	0–3	4–1	0–3	3–0	– (Note: Both teams forfeited the match due to their use of illegal players.)	4–0	0–3	0–1	0–3	0–3	3–0
Daegu FC B	0–1	1–1	—	0–2	0–2	1–1	1–3	1–2	1–1	4–2	2–2	0–2	2–1	2–0	0–1	1–1	5–2
Daejeon FC B	3–1	3–0	3–3	—	2–1	2–2	3–0	0–2	5–4	4–0	1–2	0–3	2–1	2–1	3–1	2–2	1–2
Gangwon FC B	1–2	4–0	0–1	0–2	—	3–0	1–1	2–0	1–3	1–1	3–0	4–1	0–1	3–1	2–0	1–1	0–1
Geoje Citizen	2–4	1–2	0–0	2–1	0–1	—	2–0	0–2	0–1	1–2	3–0	0–0	2–1	2–1	2–0	2–2	2–0
Jeonbuk Hyundai Moters B	2–0	2–1	1–0	3–2	0–2	2–3	—	2–4	4–5	0–0	3–3	2–0	0–1	4–1	4–2	1–0	0–2
Goyang KH	0–1	3–0	3–2	5–1	3–2	1–1	4–3	—	3–2	1–2	3–0	3–0	3–1	5–1	2–1	0–2	4–1
Jeonju Citizen	3–3	2–0	2–0	0–1	1–5	1–1	2–1	1–4	—	0–0	1–2	2–4	1–0	3–1	0–0	3–0	3–2
Jinju Citizen	2–2	3–0	1–0	1–3	0–2	1–2	0–1	1–1	1–2	—	1–0	1–2	4–1	1–0	3–4	1–2	0–3
FC Namdong	0–3	2–1	3–0	0–3	0–3	3–4	0–3	0–3	1–1	2–2	—	0–0	0–3	3–2	0–3	0–1	0–3
Pyeongchang United	2–1	3–0	0–3	3–0	1–2	2–1	1–1	2–3	2–1	1–2	3–0	—	2–1	1–0	3–2	0–1	2–2
Pyeongtaek Citizen	0–5	1–2	1–1	2–3	1–1	0–3	2–2	1–3	1–1	3–0	1–2	0–2	—	1–1	1–0	2–0	2–0
Seoul Jungnang	1–2	3–0	1–1	3–0	0–0	2–0	2–4	0–1	2–1	0–3	1–0	1–2	3–0	—	2–2	3–0	1–0
Seoul Nowon United	1–2	1–2	2–2	3–0	2–0	2–0	4–2	3–1	3–1	0–1	3–0	1–0	2–4	1–2	—	1–2	2–1
Yangpyeong FC	0–0	0–1	3–1	3–1	1–0	4–1	2–1	1–0	3–0	0–3	3–0	2–1	1–1	1–0	2–2	—	3–0
Yeoju FC	0–3	2–1	0–2	3–0	0–1	1–2	0–0	1–2	1–2	1–2	0–4	0–1	7–4	0–1	0–2	1–2	—

Source: KFA
Legend: Blue = home team win; Yellow = draw; Red = away team win.

== Promotion play-offs ==
=== Bracket ===
First round			Final
			K3	Dangjin Citizen	0
3	Chuncheon Citizen	0	K4	Chuncheon Citizen	2
4	Pyeongchang United	0

=== First round ===
When the match was finished as a draw, its winners were decided on the regular season rankings without extra time and penalty shoot-out.

5 November 2022
14:00 (UTC+9)

Chuncheon Citizen	0–0	Pyeongchang United

Chuncheon Songam Sports Town Auxiliary Stadium, Chuncheon

=== Final ===
The promotion play-offs final (K3 League relegation play-off) was contested between the bottom team of K3 League and the winners of the first round.

13 November 2022
14:00 (UTC+9)

Dangjin Citizen	0–2	Chuncheon Citizen

Dangjin Stadium, Dangjin

== See also ==
- 2022 in South Korean football
- 2022 Korean FA Cup
