= 2020 K3 League =

K3 League
- Season: 2020
- Dates: 16 May – 5 September 2020
- Champions: Gimhae FC (1st title)
- Relegated: Chuncheon Citizen; Jeonju Citizen
- Matches: 119
- Goals: 430 (3.61 per match)
- Best Player: Choi Yong-woo
- Top goalscorer: Choi Yong-woo (15 goals)
- Biggest home win: KHNP 7–0 Yangju
- Biggest away win: Yangju 0–5 Changwon

The 2020 K3 League was the first season of the K3 League as a semi-professional league in South Korea. After the 2019 season, the former Korea National League and K3 League Advanced went defunct and rebranded as the K3 League.

Eight National League teams, six K3 League Advanced teams and two K3 League Basic teams participated in the 2020 season. The 16 participating teams were divided into two groups, the top eight and the bottom eight, after playing each other once. Each team played 22 matches including 7 group stage matches. The 15th and 16th-placed teams were directly relegated to the K4 League, and the 14th-placed team advanced to the relegation play-off.

== Teams ==
=== Stadiums and locations ===
Club	City	Stadium	Capacity
Busan Transportation Corporation	Busan	Busan Gudeok Stadium	24,363
Changwon City	Changwon	Changwon Football Center	15,116
Cheonan City	Cheonan	Cheonan Football Center	15,500
Cheongju FC	Cheongju	Cheongju Stadium	17,264
Chuncheon FC	Chuncheon	Chuncheon Stadium	20,000
Daejeon Korail	Daejeon	Daejeon Hanbat Sports Complex	17,371
Gangneung City	Gangneung	Gangneung Stadium	33,000
Gimhae FC	Gimhae	Gimhae Public Stadium	25,000
Gimpo Citizen	Gimpo	Gimpo Sports Complex	5,068
Gyeongju Citizen	Gyeongju	Gyeongju Civic Stadium	12,199
Gyeongju KHNP	Gyeongju	Gyeongju Civic Stadium	12,199
Hwaseong FC	Hwaseong	Hwaseong Stadium	35,270
Jeonju Citizen	Jeonju	Jeonju Stadium	30,000
Mokpo City	Mokpo	Mokpo International Football Center	5,952
Pyeongtaek Citizen	Pyeongtaek	Sosabeol Reports Town	15,000
Yangju Citizen	Yangju	Godeok Artificial Turf Ground	5,000

=== Foreign players ===
Club	Player 1	Player 2	Player 3	AFC player	Former players
Changwon FC	(Japan) Takuma Ishibashi				
Cheonan City	(Netherlands) Jerry van Ewijk				
Gimhae FC	(Brazil) Carlinhos				
Gimpo Citizen	(Uruguay) (Spain) Ismael Jorge Balea				
Hwaseong FC	(Niger) Olivier Bonnes				
Pyeongtaek Citizen	(Brazil) Matheus	(Brazil) Wictor Hugo	(The Gambia) Abdoulie Gomez	(Japan) Hirotomo Kawazu	
Yangju Citizen	(South Sudan) Martin Sawi	(South Sudan) Paul Puk Kun Pal			

== League table ==
Pos	Team	Pld	W	D	L	GF	GA	GD	Pts	Qualification or relegation
1	Gimhae FC (C)	22	15	4	3	39	18	+21	49	Qualification for Championship final
2	Gyeongju KHNP	22	12	6	4	38	20	+18	42	Qualification for Championship semi-final
3	Gangneung City	22	13	3	6	30	15	+15	42	Qualification for Championship first round
4	Busan Transportation Corporation	22	12	5	5	36	17	+19	41	Qualification for Championship first round
5	Mokpo City	22	10	3	9	39	30	+9	33	
6	Hwaseong FC	22	9	6	7	29	27	+2	33	
7	Daejeon Korail	22	8	8	6	30	18	+12	32	
8	Gimpo Citizen	22	6	8	8	27	27	0	26	
9	Changwon City	22	9	7	6	33	25	+8	34	
10	Cheongju FC	22	9	7	6	25	25	0	34	
11	Cheonan City	22	9	6	7	27	25	+2	33	
12	Pyeongtaek Citizen	22	6	5	11	24	40	−16	23	
13	Yangju Citizen	22	6	2	14	17	45	−28	20	
14	Gyeongju Citizen (O)	22	3	6	13	16	36	−20	15	Qualification for relegation play-off
15	Chuncheon Citizen (R)	22	2	8	12	21	43	−22	14	Relegation to K4 League
16	Jeonju Citizen (R)	22	3	4	15	19	39	−20	13	Relegation to K4 League

Source: Soccerway Flashscore
Rules for classification: 1) Points; 2) Goal difference; 3) Goals scored; 4) Wins
(C) Champions; (O) Play-off winners; (R) Relegated

== Results ==
=== Matches 1–15 ===
Home \ Away	BUS	CHA	CHC	CHE	CHU	DAE	GAN	GIH	GIM	GYC	GYE	HWA	JEO	MOK	PYE	YAN
Busan Transportation Corporation	—	0–0	1–1	—	—	3–1	—	1–2	1–1	—	2–2	0–1	—	—	—	—
Changwon City	—	—	3–3	—	0–0	—	0–1	—	0–0	—	—	2–1	—	0–3	—	3–1
Cheonan City	—	—	—	1–0	—	0–2	1–2	—	2–2	2–0	—	0–0	1–0	1–2	—	
Cheongju FC	0–3	2–0	—	—	—	—	—	2–1	—	—	1–1	0–2	1–0	—	0–0	—
Chuncheon FC	0–4	—	1–2	2–1	—	1–2	—	—	2–2	—	—	—	—	—	2–3	—
Daejeon Korail	—	—	4–0	0–0	—	—	—	—		3–1	0–0	—	—	2–2	2–0	4–0
Gangneung City	1–4	—	—	—	5–0	1–1	—	0–2	1–0	2–0	3–0	—	—	—	—	—
Gimhae FC	—	1–0	1–1	—	4–2	1–0	—	—	—	—	—	—	2–1	2–1	5–0	3–0
Gimpo Citizen	—	—	—	1–1	4–2	1–0	—	2–3	—	1–1	2–0	—	2–0	—	—	—
Gyeongju Citizen	0–1	2–2	—	1–1	1–0	—	—	0–4	—	—	—	—	1–1	0–2	—	—
Gyeongju KHNP	—	2–0	1–0	—	—	—	—	2–0	0–2	1–0	—	4–0	2–1	—	4–2	7–0
Hwaseong FC	—	—	—	—	3–1	2–1	0–1	2–2	1–0	0–0	—	—	—	2–3	—	1–0
Jeonju Citizen	0–2	1–3	—	—	1–0	0–3	1–3	—		—	—	2–4	—	2–1	0–0	—
Mokpo City	2–2	—	—	0–1	5–1	—	2–2	—	0–1	—	1–2	—	—	—	—	3–0
Pyeongtaek Citizen	2–1	0–1	1–2	—	—	—	0–2	—	0–4	1–0	—	1–2	—	2–4	—	—
Yangju Citizen	0–2	—	4–2	0–2	0–0	—	1–0	—		3–2	—	—	1–2	—	1–1	—

Source: Soccerway
Legend: Blue = home team win; Yellow = draw; Red = away team win.

=== Matches 16–22 ===
After 15 matches, the league splits into two sections of eight teams each, with teams playing every other team in their section once (either at home or away). The exact matches are determined upon the league table at the time of the split.

==== Final A ====
Home \ Away	BUS	DAE	GAN	GIH	GIM	GYE	HWA	MOK
Busan Transportation Corporation	—	0–1	1–0	—	—	—	—	3–1
Daejeon Korail	—	—	—	0–0	1–1	—	1–1	—
Gangneung City	—	1–0	—	—	2–0	—	1–0	2–0
Gimhae FC	0–2	—	1–0	—	2–1	1–0	—	—
Gimpo Citizen	0–1	—	—	—	—	1–4	—	1–2
Gyeongju KHNP	2–1	1–1	0–0	—	—	—	—	0–2
Hwaseong FC	0–1	—	—	1–1	2–2	2–3	—	—
Mokpo City	—	2–1	—	0–1	—	—	1–2	—

Source: Soccerway
Legend: Blue = home team win; Yellow = draw; Red = away team win.

==== Final B ====
Home \ Away	CHA	CHC	CHE	CHU	GYC	JEO	PYE	YAN
Changwon City	—	—	2–2	1–1	4–0	1–0	—	—
Cheonan City	0–3	—	—	0–0	—	—	3–0	0–1
Cheongju FC	—	1–3	—	3–1	1–1	—	—	2–1
Chuncheon FC	—	—	—	—	1–2	2–2	—	2–0
Gyeongju Citizen	—	0–1	—	—	—	—	1–3	0–1
Jeonju Citizen	—	0–1	2–3	—	1–3	—	—	—
Pyeongtaek Citizen	1–3	—	3–0	2–2	—	1–1	—	—
Yangju Citizen	0–5	—	—	—	—	2–1	0–1	—

Source: Soccerway
Legend: Blue = home team win; Yellow = draw; Red = away team win.

== Championship play-offs ==
When the first round and semi-final matches were finished as draws, their winners were decided on the regular season rankings without extra time and the penalty shoot-out.

=== Bracket ===
First round
3	Gangneung City	0
4	Busan Transportation Corporation	0

Semi-final
2	Gyeongju KHNP	1
3	Gangneung City	0

Final
1	Gimhae FC	1	1	2
2	Gyeongju KHNP	0	1	1

=== First round ===
14 November 2020
14:00 KST

Gangneung City	0–0	Busan Transportation Corporation
	Report

Gangneung Stadium
Attendance: 155
Referee: Lee Youngkyun

=== Semi-final ===
21 November 2020
14:00 KST

Gyeongju KHNP	1–0	Gangneung City
Kim Chan-hee 34'	Report

Gyeongju Civic Stadium
Attendance: 156
Referee: Choi Gyu-hyun

=== Final ===
28 November 2020
14:00 KST

Gyeongju KHNP	0–1	Gimhae FC
		Joo Han-sung 80'

Gyeongju Civic Stadium
Attendance: 286
Referee: Seoul Tae-hwan

5 December 2020
14:00 KST

Gimhae FC	1–1	Gyeongju KHNP
Joo Han-sung 31'	Report	Cho Woo-jin 51'

Gimhae Public Stadium
Attendance: 0
Referee: Choi Cheol-joon

Gimhae FC won 2–1 on aggregate.

== Relegation play-off ==
The relegation play-off (K4 League promotion play-offs final) was contested between the 14th-placed team of K3 League and the winners of K4 League play-off (semi-final). When the match was finished as a draw, both clubs remained in their respective leagues.

21 November 2020
14:00 KST

Gyeongju Citizen	2–2	Jinju Citizen
Min Jae-kwon 26'; Seong Jun-jeong 57' (pen.)		Cho Seong-wook 78'; Jun Beom-byun 90+1'

Gyeongju Civic Stadium
Attendance: 0
Referee: Choi Ki-chang

== See also ==
- 2020 in South Korean football
- 2020 Korean FA Cup
