= 2024 K4 League =

- Season: 2024
- Champions: Jeonbuk Hyundai Motors B (1st title)
- Promoted: Jeonbuk Hyundai Motors B
- Best player: Jin Tae-ho
- Top goalscorer: Kim Dong-ryul (20 goals)

The 2024 K4 League was the fifth season of the K4 League, a semi-professional league and the fourth tier of men's football in South Korea.

During the regular season, each of the 13 participating teams played each other twice in a double round-robin system. Jeonbuk Hyundai Motors B won the league and gained automatic promotion to the 2025 K3 League. Daejeon Hana Citizen B finished as league runners-up, which would have earned them promotion, however it was announced shortly before the end of the 2024 season that the team would not be participating in the 2025 season.

At present, there is no relegation from K4 League to K5 League, an amateur league.

== Teams ==
Thirteen teams participated in the 2024 K4 League.

=== Team changes ===
Relegated from K3 League

- Yangju Citizen

Newly joined

- Namyangju FC

Promoted to K3 League

- Yeoju FC
- Daegu FC B

Withdrawn

- Busan IPark Futures
- Gangwon FC B
- Yangju Citizen (temporarily)

=== Stadiums and locations ===
Club	City	Stadium
Daejeon Hana Citizen B	Daejeon	Daejeon World Cup Stadium Auxiliary Stadium
Dangjin Citizen	Dangjin	Dangjin Sports Complex
FC Chungju	Chungju	Chungju Tangeum Stadium
FC Sejong	Sejong	Sejong Civic Stadium Auxiliary Stadium
Geoje Citizen	Geoje	Geoje Stadium
Jeonbuk Hyundai Motors B	Jeonju	Wanju Stadium
Jeonju Citizen	Jeonju	Jeonju Stadium
Jinju Citizen	Jinju	Jinju Stadium
Namyangju FC	Namyangju	
Pyeongchang United	Pyeongchang	Jinbu Sports Park
Pyeongtaek Citizen	Pyeongtaek	Ichung Leports Park
Seoul Jungnang	Seoul	Jungnang Public Ground
Seoul Nowon United	Seoul	Nowon Madeul Stadium

== League table ==
Pos	Team	Pld	W	D	L	GF	GA	GD	Pts	Qualification
1	Jeonbuk Hyundai Motors B (C, P)	24	17	3	4	57	27	+30	54	Promotion to K3 League
2	Daejeon Hana Citizen B (Note: Daejeon Hana Citizen B did not qualify for the promotion play-off due to its dissolution after the season.)	24	11	4	9	41	32	+9	37	
3	Seoul Nowon United (Note: Seoul Nowon United received a 9 point deduction.)	24	13	4	7	63	43	+20	34	Qualification for promotion play-off
4	Jeonju Citizen	24	9	7	8	43	36	+7	34	
5	Jinju Citizen	24	10	4	10	36	36	0	34	
6	Namyangju FC	24	9	7	8	36	36	0	34	
7	Dangjin Citizen	24	11	1	12	46	47	−1	34	
8	Geoje Citizen	24	9	7	8	38	47	−9	34	
9	Pyeongchang United	24	9	5	10	39	35	+4	32	
10	FC Chungju (Note: FC Chungju received a 2 point deduction.)	24	10	4	10	43	43	0	32	
11	Seoul Jungnang (Note: Seoul Jungnang received a 4 point deduction.)	24	8	6	10	34	38	−4	26	
12	Pyeongtaek Citizen	24	6	7	11	39	34	+5	25	
13	FC Sejong	24	3	3	18	29	90	−61	12	

Source: Soccerway
Rules for classification: 1) Points; 2) Goal difference; 3) Head-to-head points; 4) Goals scored; 5) Wins
(C) Champions; (P) Promoted

== Promotion play-off ==
The promotion play-off was contested between the 15th-placed team of K3 League and the third-placed team of K4 League (instead of runners-up Daejeon Hana Citizen B).

9 November 2024
14:00 (UTC+9)

Pocheon Citizen	3–1	Seoul Nowon United
	Report

Pocheon Stadium, Pocheon

== See also ==
- 2024 in South Korean football
- 2024 Korean FA Cup
