= 2021 K4 League =

K4 League
- Season: 2021
- Dates: 13 March – 13 November 2021
- Champions: Pocheon Citizen (1st title)
- Promoted: Pocheon Citizen; Siheung Citizen; Dangjin Citizen
- Matches played: 241
- Goals scored: 769 (3.19 per match)
- Best Player: Jung Seung-yong
- Top goalscorer: Lee Chang-hoon (30 goals)

The 2021 K4 League is the second season of the K4 League.

The R League teams (reserve teams of K League teams) could not have been involved in the South Korean football league system originally, but were allowed to join the K4 League since this season. They had to use seven or more under-23 players in the starting line-up. Gangwon FC became the first club to enter the K4 League with reserve team.

Defending champions Paju Citizen were promoted to the K3 League alongside runners-up Ulsan Citizen, and Chuncheon Citizen and Jeonju Citizen played in the K4 League for the first time by being relegated from the K3 League. Icheon Citizen was disbanded due to financial problems, while four newly-founded teams Dangjin Citizen, Geoje Citizen, Pyeongchang United (successor to K3 League Basic team Pyeongchang FC) and Gangwon FC B joined the league.

The 16 participating teams played each other twice. The top two teams were directly promoted to the K3 League, and the third and fourth-placed teams qualified for the promotion play-off.

== Teams ==
=== Team changes ===
Relegated from K3 League

- Chuncheon Citizen
- Jeonju Citizen

Newly joined

- Dangjin Citizen
- Gangwon FC B
- Geoje Citizen
- Pyeongchang United

Promoted to K3 League

- Paju Citizen
- Ulsan Citizen

Withdrawn

- Icheon Citizen

=== Stadiums and locations ===
Club	City	Stadium	Capacity
Chuncheon Citizen	Chuncheon	Chuncheon Stadium	25,000
Chungju Citizen	Chungju	Chungju Tangeum Stadium	3,000
Dangjin Citizen	Dangjin	Dangjin Sports Complex	11,718
FC Namdong	Incheon	Namdong Industrial Complex Park	2,500
Gangwon FC B	Gangwon	Chuncheon Songam Stadium	20,000
Geoje Citizen	Geoje	Geoje Stadium	7,500
Goyang Citizen	Goyang	Eoulimnuri Byeolmuri Ground	2,500
Jeonju Citizen	Jeonju	Jeonju Stadium	30,000
Jinju Citizen	Jinju	Jinju Stadium	20,116
Pocheon Citizen	Pocheon	Pocheon Stadium	7,000
Pyeongchang United	Pyeongchang	Jinbu Sports Park	300
Seoul Jungnang	Seoul	Jungnang Public Ground	400
Seoul Nowon United	Seoul	Nowon Madeul Stadium	446
Siheung Citizen	Siheung	Jeongwang Sports Park	1,500
Yangpyeong FC	Yangpyeong	Yongmun Sports Park	3,000
Yeoju FC	Yeoju	Yeoju Stadium	16,000

=== Personnel ===
Club	Manager
Chuncheon Citizen	(South Korea) Son Hyun-jun
Chungju Citizen	(South Korea) Gong Mun-bae
Dangjin Citizen	(South Korea) Han Sang-min
FC Namdong	(South Korea) Kim Jeong-jae
Gangwon FC B	(South Korea) Lee Seul-gi
Geoje Citizen	(South Korea) Song Jae-gyu
Goyang Citizen	(South Korea) Kim Young-ho
Jeonju Citizen	(South Korea) Yang Young-cheol
Jinju Citizen	(South Korea) Choi Cheong-il
Pocheon Citizen	(South Korea) Cho Man-geun
Pyeongchang United	(South Korea) An Hong-min
Seoul Jungnang	(South Korea) Kim Sang-hwa
Seoul Nowon United	(South Korea) Lee Jeong-jae
Siheung Citizen	(South Korea) Jeong Seon-woo
Yangpyeong FC	(South Korea) Kim Chang-yoon
Yeoju FC	(South Korea) Shim Bong-seop

== League table ==
Pos	Team	Pld	W	D	L	GF	GA	GD	Pts	Qualification
1	Pocheon Citizen (C, P)	30	21	6	3	80	28	+52	69	Promotion to K3 League
2	Siheung Citizen (P)	30	21	4	5	75	32	+43	67	Promotion to K3 League
3	Dangjin Citizen (O, P)	30	19	5	6	60	40	+20	62	Qualification for promotion play-off
4	Chungju Citizen	30	17	6	7	60	31	+29	57	Qualification for promotion play-off
5	Jinju Citizen	30	16	8	6	57	28	+29	56	
6	Geoje Citizen	30	13	8	9	50	39	+11	47	
7	Pyeongchang United	30	14	4	12	43	49	−6	46	
8	Gangwon FC B	30	11	7	12	50	44	+6	40	
9	FC Namdong	30	11	3	16	39	47	−8	36	
10	Chuncheon Citizen	30	10	6	14	40	51	−11	36	
11	Seoul Nowon United	30	9	5	16	40	53	−13	32	
12	Yeoju FC	30	8	6	16	34	58	−24	30	
13	Yangpyeong FC	30	7	8	15	39	52	−13	29	
14	Seoul Jungnang	30	6	7	17	33	62	−29	25	
15	Jeonju Citizen	30	7	3	20	39	71	−32	24	
16	Goyang Citizen	30	5	4	21	30	84	−54	19	

Source: Soccerway JoinKFA
Rules for classification: 1) Points; 2) Goal difference; 3) Head-to-head points; 4) Goals scored; 5) Wins
(C) Champions; (O) Play-off winners; (P) Promoted

== Results ==
Home \ Away	PCH	GWO	NAM	JIN	SIH	YPY	SNU	DAN	POC	CHC	GOY	GEO	CHU	JEO	YEO	SJN
Pyeongchang United	—	2–1	2–1	1–3	1–4	3–2	4–4	1–1	2–4	1–1	2–0	2–0	0–0	3–1	1–0	1–0
Gangwon FC B	1–2	—	4–1	0–1	0–3	1–1	2–1	1–1	0–0	2–3	2–0	1–1	0–3	2–0	0–2	4–0
FC Namdong	1–2	0–2	—	1–4	0–0	2–0	1–0	0–1	0–1	1–2	1–2	0–2	3–0	3–0	2–1	2–0
Jinju Citizen	4–0	2–1	2–2	—	2–2	2–1	4–0	1–1	1–1	3–0	0–2	3–0	1–1	1–1	0–1	0–0
Siheung Citizen	0–1	3–2	1–1	1–0	—	2–0	4–1	4–0	3–2	2–1	3–2	1–2	4–3	2–1	4–0	0–1
Yangpyeong FC	2–1	1–0	4–0	1–1	1–2	—	2–1	1–3	0–2	1–1	1–0	0–0	0–2	2–4	1–1	3–1
Seoul Nowon United	0–1	0–2	2–1	0–4	0–2	2–0	—	0–1	1–2	1–0	2–1	0–1	1–0	2–1	4–2	3–1
Dangjin Citizen	1–0	4–4	1–0	0–2	1–0	3–3	3–2	—	2–1	2–1	5–0	2–4	1–0	2–0	5–2	3–1
Pocheon Citizen	1–0	3–1	4–0	2–0	2–2	4–1	2–1	5–1	—	3–0	1–1	3–2	4–0	3–1	4–0	4–0
Chungju Citizen	4–0	1–1	1–3	1–0	1–3	1–0	2–2	1–0	3–2	—	7–0	2–1	2–1	4–1	3–0	0–0
Goyang Citizen	1–4	1–3	0–2	1–2	1–10	2–2	1–3	0–5	3–2	0–4	—	1–7	2–1	1–2	0–2	2–1
Geoje Citizen	2–1	1–3	1–1	2–0	1–2	3–3	2–2	0–2	3–3	1–3	1–1	—	0–1	2–1	0–0	3–0
Chuncheon Citizen	1–3	2–1	3–1	2–3	0–2	2–1	2–1	1–3	0–5	1–1	3–1	0–2	—	3–1	3–1	0–2
Jeonju Citizen	2–1	1–3	4–2	0–5	1–3	1–2	0–0	2–3	0–4	0–4	3–2	1–2	1–1	—	1–3	1–5
Yeoju FC	1–2	1–4	1–3	1–1	2–2	3–2	3–2	0–1	0–2	0–3	2–1	0–1	1–1	1–3	—	0–0
Seoul Jungnang	4–0	2–2	0–3	1–3	0–4	2–1	2–2	3–2	2–2	0–3	1–1	1–1	2–2	0–4	1–2	—

Source: Soccerway
Legend: Blue = home team win; Yellow = draw; Red = away team win.

== Promotion play-off ==
When the match was finished as a draw, its winners were decided on the regular season rankings without extra time and penalty shoot-out.

14 November 2021
14:00 (UTC+9)

Dangjin Citizen	1–1	Chungju Citizen

Dangjin Stadium, Dangjin

== See also ==
- 2021 in South Korean football
- 2021 Korean FA Cup
