= 2024 K3 League =

Korean third tier football league season

K3 League
- Season: 2024
- Dates: 2 March – 16 November 2024
- Champions: Siheung Citizen (1st title)
- Promoted: Hwaseong FC
- Relegated: Daegu FC B
- Matches: 56
- Goals: 145 (2.59 per match)
- Best player: Camilo
- Top goalscorer: Camilo (15 goals)
- Biggest home win: Siheung 5–0 Mokpo (7 April)
- Biggest away win: Yeoju 1–5 KHNP (14 April)
- Highest scoring: Yeoju 1–5 KHNP (14 April)
- Longest winning run: 6 matches Gyeongju KHNP
- Longest unbeaten run: 7 matches 3 teams
- Longest winless run: 7 matches Busan Transportation Corporation
- Longest losing run: 6 matches Busan Transportation Corporation
- All statistics correct as of 2 November 2024.

The 2024 K3 League is the fifth season of South Korea's K3 League as a semi-professional association football league. It was held from 2 March to 2 November 2024. The 16 participating teams played each other twice in a double round-robin format.

The 15th and 16th-placed teams were going to be automatically relegated to the K4 League, but the 15th-placed team qualified for the relegation play-off instead of the 14th-placed team after the dissolution of K4 League club Daejeon Hana Citizen B was decided.

Runners-up Hwaseong FC turned professional after the season ended and joined K League 2 ahead of the 2025 season.

== Teams ==
=== Team changes ===
Promoted from K4 League

- Yeoju FC
- Daegu FC B

Relegated to K4 League

- Yangju Citizen

=== Stadiums and locations ===
Locations of the 2024 K3 League teams

| Club | City | Stadium | Capacity |
|---|---|---|---|
| Busan Transportation Corporation | Busan | Busan Gudeok Stadium | 12,349 |
| Changwon FC | Changwon | Changwon Stadium | 30,000 |
| Chuncheon Citizen | Chuncheon | Chuncheon Songam Sports Town | 20,000 |
| Daegu FC B | Daegu | Daegu Stadium | 66,422 |
| Daejeon Korail | Daejeon | Daejeon World Cup Stadium Auxiliary Pitch | 478 |
| FC Mokpo | Mokpo | Mokpo International Football Center | 5,952 |
| Gangneung Citizen | Gangneung | Gangneung Stadium | 21,416 |
| Gimhae FC | Gimhae | Gimhae Public Stadium | 11,467 |
| Gyeongju KHNP | Gyeongju | Gyeongju Civic Stadium | 12,118 |
| Hwaseong FC | Hwaseong | Hwaseong Stadium | 35,265 |
| Paju Citizen | Paju | Paju Stadium | 23,000 |
| Pocheon Citizen | Pocheon | Pocheon Stadium | 5,964 |
| Siheung Citizen | Siheung | Siheung Hope Park Stadium | 1,500 |
| Ulsan Citizen | Ulsan | Ulsan Stadium | 19,431 |
| Yangpyeong FC | Yangpyeong | Yangpyeong Sports Complex | 5,608 |
| Yeoju FC | Yeoju | Yeoju Stadium | 3,000 |

=== Personnel ===
| Club | Manager |
|---|---|
| Busan Transportation Corporation | (South Korea) Shin Hong-gi |
| Changwon FC | (South Korea) Lee Young-jin |
| Chuncheon Citizen | (South Korea) Jeong Seon-woo |
| Daegu FC B | (South Korea) Seo Dong-won |
| Daejeon Korail | (South Korea) Kim Seung-hee |
| FC Mokpo | (South Korea) Cho Deok-je |
| Gangneung Citizen | (South Korea) Kim Do-keun |
| Gimhae FC | (South Korea) Son Hyeon-jun |
| Gyeongju KHNP | (South Korea) Seo Bo-won |
| Hwaseong FC | (South Korea) Ju Seung-jin |
| Paju Citizen | (South Korea) Oh Beom-seok |
| Pocheon Citizen | (South Korea) Lee Seong-jae |
| Siheung Citizen | (South Korea) Park Seung-soo |
| Ulsan Citizen | (South Korea) Yoon Kyun-sang |
| Yangpyeong FC | (South Korea) Kim Sam-su |
| Yeoju FC | (South Korea) Shim Bong-seop |

=== Foreign players ===
The number of foreign players is restricted to three per team, or four per team if one player is from an AFC country.

| Club | Player 1 | Player 2 | Player 3 | AFC player | Former player(s) |
|---|---|---|---|---|---|
| Gangneung Citizen | (Brazil) Jordan Rodrigues | (Brazil) Careca | (Brazil) Fernando | | |
| Gyeongju KHNP | (Brazil) Leonardo Kalil | | | (Japan) Reo Nishiguchi | |
| Hwaseong FC | (Brazil) Luan Costa | (Brazil) Sandy | | (Australia) Moudi Najjar | (Brazil) Caio Marcelo |
| Siheung Citizen | (Brazil) Dimitri | (Brazil) Camilo | | | |
| Yangpyeong FC | (Brazil) Victor Ribeiro | (Brazil) Ruster | (Brazil) Henrique Bahia | | |

== League table ==
| Pos | Team | Pld | W | D | L | GF | GA | GD | Pts | Promotion or relegation |
|---|---|---|---|---|---|---|---|---|---|---|
| 1 | Siheung Citizen (C) | 30 | 18 | 6 | 6 | 60 | 27 | +33 | 60 | |
| 2 | Hwaseong FC (P) | 30 | 16 | 8 | 6 | 56 | 32 | +24 | 56 | Promotion to K League 2 (Note: Promoted after getting a license for K League 2.) |
| 3 | Gyeongju KHNP | 30 | 17 | 5 | 8 | 44 | 28 | +16 | 56 | |
| 4 | Changwon FC | 30 | 14 | 8 | 8 | 48 | 31 | +17 | 50 | |
| 5 | Gimhae FC | 30 | 13 | 11 | 6 | 41 | 28 | +13 | 50 | |
| 6 | FC Mokpo | 30 | 15 | 4 | 11 | 49 | 45 | +4 | 49 | |
| 7 | Daejeon Korail | 30 | 11 | 13 | 6 | 42 | 28 | +14 | 46 | |
| 8 | Paju Citizen | 30 | 11 | 9 | 10 | 30 | 30 | 0 | 42 | |
| 9 | Gangneung Citizen | 30 | 10 | 9 | 11 | 34 | 41 | −7 | 39 | |
| 10 | Yangpyeong FC | 30 | 11 | 4 | 15 | 33 | 45 | −12 | 37 | |
| 11 | Yeoju FC | 30 | 9 | 8 | 13 | 26 | 42 | −16 | 35 | |
| 12 | Ulsan Citizen | 30 | 9 | 7 | 14 | 30 | 43 | −13 | 34 | |
| 13 | Busan Transportation Corporation | 30 | 9 | 3 | 18 | 38 | 60 | −22 | 30 | |
| 14 | Chuncheon Citizen | 30 | 4 | 14 | 12 | 27 | 38 | −11 | 26 | |
| 15 | Pocheon Citizen (O) | 30 | 5 | 11 | 14 | 34 | 49 | −15 | 26 | Qualification for relegation play-off |
| 16 | Daegu FC B (R) | 30 | 5 | 6 | 19 | 36 | 61 | −25 | 21 | Relegation to K4 League |

Source: Soccerway
Rules for classification: 1) Points; 2) Goal difference; 3) Goals scored; 4) Wins
(C) Champions; (O) Play-off winners; (P) Promoted; (R) Relegated

== Results ==
| Home \ Away | BTC | CHA | CHU | DGU | DKO | GNE | GIH | GYE | HWA | MOK | PJC | POC | SIH | ULC | YPY | YEO |
|---|---|---|---|---|---|---|---|---|---|---|---|---|---|---|---|---|
| Busan Transportation Corporation | — | 2–1 | 0–1 | 1–6 | 0–0 | 0–3 | 2–3 | 1–0 | 1–3 | 2–0 | 1–3 | 2–1 | 3–1 | 3–4 | 1–3 | 0–1 |
| Changwon FC | 2–1 | — | 1–1 | 1–0 | 0–1 | 2–1 | 0–2 | 0–1 | 2–2 | 3–0 | 1–2 | 0–0 | 2–2 | 1–0 | 2–0 | 0–0 |
| Chuncheon Citizen | 2–2 | 2–3 | — | 1–1 | 1–2 | 0–1 | 1–1 | 3–2 | 2–1 | 2–3 | 1–1 | 2–3 | 0–2 | 2–0 | 0–3 | 0–1 |
| Daegu FC B | 4–2 | 0–1 | 2–2 | — | 0–4 | 1–1 | 2–3 | 2–1 | 0–3 | 2–0 | 2–4 | 2–2 | 1–4 | 1–2 | 1–2 | 1–2 |
| Daejeon Korail | 0–0 | 3–3 | 1–1 | 1–0 | — | 1–0 | 1–1 | 2–1 | 3–1 | 0–1 | 0–0 | 4–0 | 0–1 | 1–1 | 3–1 | 3–1 |
| Gangneung Citizen | 2–1 | 1–0 | 0–0 | 1–0 | 3–2 | — | 2–3 | 1–2 | 1–6 | 0–5 | 1–1 | 3–1 | 2–1 | 0–0 | 0–0 | 0–0 |
| Gimhae FC | 1–2 | 2–1 | 0–0 | 5–0 | 1–1 | 3–0 | — | 0–0 | 1–2 | 0–2 | 1–0 | 1–1 | 1–2 | 1–0 | 2–0 | 0–0 |
| Gyeongju KHNP | 1–0 | 0–0 | 2–0 | 3–0 | 1–0 | 2–1 | 2–1 | — | 1–1 | 2–0 | 1–0 | 2–1 | 1–1 | 1–2 | 2–0 | 0–2 |
| Hwaseong FC | 5–2 | 4–5 | 0–0 | 2–0 | 2–2 | 1–0 | 1–1 | 2–0 | — | 1–0 | 2–0 | 1–4 | 2–2 | 1–0 | 1–0 | 3–0 |
| FC Mokpo | 2–0 | 0–3 | 2–2 | 4–2 | 1–1 | 1–1 | 1–2 | 4–0 | 1–3 | — | 1–0 | 3–2 | 3–3 | 1–0 | 3–1 | 3–0 |
| Paju Citizen | 1–2 | 1–2 | 0–0 | 1–0 | 1–2 | 2–1 | 1–1 | 1–1 | 0–2 | 0–1 | — | 3–1 | 0–2 | 2–0 | 1–1 | 1–0 |
| Pocheon Citizen | 1–3 | 1–1 | 0–0 | 1–1 | 1–2 | 2–1 | 0–0 | 0–2 | 0–0 | 2–4 | 1–2 | — | 2–2 | 2–1 | 0–1 | 1–2 |
| Siheung Citizen | 3–1 | 1–0 | 0–0 | 2–0 | 2–1 | 0–2 | 1–2 | 0–2 | 1–0 | 5–0 | 3–0 | 0–1 | — | 2–0 | 6–0 | 4–1 |
| Ulsan Citizen | 3–1 | 0–4 | 2–1 | 0–0 | 1–1 | 0–0 | 0–0 | 1–4 | 1–3 | 0–2 | 0–0 | 2–2 | 0–2 | — | 3–2 | 2–0 |
| Yangpyeong FC | 3–1 | 1–5 | 1–0 | 3–4 | 1–0 | 1–1 | 3–0 | 1–2 | 2–1 | 2–0 | 0–1 | 1–0 | 0–2 | 0–2 | — | 0–0 |
| Yeoju FC | 0–1 | 0–2 | 1–0 | 2–1 | 2–2 | 3–4 | 0–2 | 1–5 | 0–0 | 1–2 | 0–0 | 1–1 | 0–3 | 1–2 | 1–0 | — |

Source: JoinKFA Livesport
Legend: Blue = home team win; Yellow = draw; Red = away team win.
For upcoming matches, an "a" indicates there is an article about the rivalry between the two participants.

== Relegation play-off ==
The relegation play-off was contested between the 15th-placed team of K3 League and the third-placed team of K4 League (instead of runners-up Daejeon Hana Citizen B).

9 November 2024
14:00 (UTC+9)

| Pocheon Citizen | 3–1 | Seoul Nowon United |
|---|---|---|
| | Report |

Pocheon Stadium, Pocheon

== See also ==
- 2024 in South Korean football
- 2024 Korea Cup
