= Namyangju FC =

Association football club in South Korea

- Full name: Namyangju FC 남양주시민축구단
- Founded: 10 December 2023; 2 years ago
- Ground: Namyangju Sports Complex
- Capacity: 2,901
- Owner: Namyangju City Council
- Chairman: Joo Kwang-deok (Mayor of Namyangju)
- Manager: Kim Seong-il
- League: K4 League
- 2024: 6th of 13
- Website: nyjfc.com
Home colours	Away colours

Namyangju FC (Korean: 남양주시민축구단) is a semi-professional South Korean football club based in Namyangju, Gyeonggi Province. The club was founded in 2023 and plays in the K4 League, the fourth tier of football in South Korea.

== History ==
=== Founding ===
The club was founded on 10 December 2023, with Kim Seong-il as manager and Jeong Gwang-min as coach.

=== Inaugural Season ===
Under the charge of Kim Seong-il, Namyangju played their first match on 16 March 2024, a home 1–1 draw against Jinju Citizen FC. They finished the 2024 season in 6th position. The season was uncharacteristically congested with all teams from 3rd through 8th position having the same league points, with final places being determined by goal difference and number of wins. In the FA cup the failed to progress past the first round, losing to K3 League side Paju Citizen FC.

The club represented Namyangju City in the 2024 Gyeonggi Provincial Sports Festival, and won the championship by beating Hwaseong FC 1:0 in the final.

=== Second Season ===
Still managed by Kim Seong-il, Namyangju FC started their second league season well with nine matches undefeated, six wins and three draws. They would remain at the top of the standings for most of the season, overtaken only for brief periods by Dangjin Citizen FC.

In the Korea Cup they progressed to the third round where they suffered an 3–0 away loss to Daejeon Korail FC on 16 April.

Their end of season form failed them, and their last 5 results were a draw followed by four consecutive losses, often against low ranked teams, dropping them to second place behind Dangjin based on goal difference. They finished the season with 5 straight losses by when they lost to FC Mokpo in the K3/4 League promotion-relegation match.

== Players ==
=== Current squad ===
As of 2 April 2025

Note: Flags indicate national team as defined under FIFA eligibility rules; some limited exceptions apply. Players may hold more than one non-FIFA nationality.

No.	Pos.	Nation	Player
1	GK	KOR	Park Han-geun
3	DF	KOR	Jo Gyeong-chan
4	DF	KOR	Lee Jin-seob
5	DF	KOR	Hwang Gi-uk
6	MF	KOR	Kim Tae-young
7	FW	KOR	Shin Jae-hyuk
8	FW	KOR	Seok Hyun-joon (captain)
9	FW	KOR	Yu Joo-an(vice-captain)
10	FW	KOR	Lee Jong-yeol
11	DF	KOR	Lee Sae-han
13	FW	KOR	Kang Min-seung
16	MF	KOR	Jo Jae-hyuk
17	MF	KOR	Shin Sang-hui
18	DF	KOR	Hong Dong-gwan
19	FW	KOR	Hong Seok-hwan

No.	Pos.	Nation	Player
20	DF	KOR	Lee Tae-geuk
21	FW	KOR	Han Jung-woo
22	DF	KOR	An Su-hyeok
23	MF	KOR	Bak Jae-young
24	MF	KOR	Kang Ji-wan
26	DF	KOR	Lee Jun-seok
29	GK	KOR	Kim Min-jae
30	FW	KOR	Baek Seung-won
31	GK	KOR	Seo Dong-hun
38	DF	KOR	Kim Ji-sung
41	FW	KOR	Park Hyo-min
44	DF	KOR	Yun Seo-ho
66	DF	KOR	Jang Sung-don
77	DF	KOR	Shin Sung-jae
88	DF	KOR	Jeon Chan-wool

=== Retired number(s) ===
12 – Fans of the club (the 12th Man)

== Season-by-season records ==
Season	Teams	League	Position	Pld	W	D	L	GF	GA	GD	Pts	FA Cup	Notes
2024	13	K4 League	6th	24	9	7	8	36	36	0	34	First Round	70th Gyeonggi-do Sports Festival Winners
2025	13	K4 League	-	-	-	-	-	-	-	-	-	Third Round	71st Gyeonggi-do Sports Festival Winners
