= 2023 K4 League =

K4 League
- Season: 2023
- Dates: 25 February – 11 November 2023
- Champions: Yeoju FC (1st title)
- Promoted: Yeoju FC; Daegu FC B
- Best player: Jeong Chung-geun
- Top goalscorer: Jeong Chung-geun (17 goals)

The 2023 K4 League was the fourth season of the K4 League.

Defending champions Goyang KH was dissolved. Runners-up Yangpyeong FC and promotion play-offs winners Chuncheon Citizen were promoted to the K3 League, while Dangjin Citizen were relegated from the K3 League.

The 16 participating teams played each other twice. The top two teams were promoted to the K3 League and the third and fourth-placed teams qualified for the promotion play-offs.

On 3 July 2023, Goyang Happiness were dissolved due to their financial crisis and Korea Football Association decided to nullify Goyang Happiness' results.

== Teams ==
=== Team changes ===
Relegated from K3 League

- Dangjin Citizen

Newly joined

- Busan IPark Futures
- ~~Goyang Happiness~~ (invalidated)
- Sejong Vanesse

Promoted to K3 League

- Yangpyeong FC
- Chuncheon Citizen

Withdrawn

- Goyang KH
- FC Namdong

=== Stadiums and locations ===
Club	City	Stadium	Capacity
Busan IPark Futures	Busan	Busan Asiad Auxiliary Stadium	4,549
FC Chungju	Chungju	Chungju Tangeum Stadium	3,000
Daegu FC B	Daegu	Daegu Stadium Auxiliary Stadium	66,422
Daejeon Hana Citizen B	Daejeon	Daejeon World Cup Stadium Auxiliary Stadium	
Daejeon Hana Citizen B	Boeun	Boeun Stadium	
Dangjin Citizen	Dangjin	Dangjin Sports Complex	11,718
Gangwon FC B	Gangneung	Gangbuk Public Stadium	
Gangwon FC B	Gangneung	Gangnam Football Park	
Gangwon FC B	Gangneung	Gangneung Olympic Park	
Gangwon FC B	Wonju	Wonju Stadium	
Gangwon FC B	Donghae	Donghae Stadium	
Geoje Citizen	Geoje	Geoje Stadium	7,500
Jeonbuk Hyundai Motors B	Wanju	Wanju Stadium	
Jeonju Citizen	Jeonju	Jeonju Stadium	30,000
Jeonju Citizen	Jeonju	Jeonju University Artificial Turf Ground A (Note: Used during August.)	
Jinju Citizen	Jinju	Jinju Stadium	20,116
Pyeongchang United	Pyeongchang	Jinbu Sports Park	300
Pyeongtaek Citizen	Pyeongtaek	Ichung Reports Park	15,000
Sejong Vanesse	Sejong City	Sejong Civic Stadium Auxiliary Stadium	
Seoul Jungnang	Seoul	Jungnang Public Ground	400
Seoul Nowon United	Seoul	Nowon Madeul Stadium	446
Yeoju FC	Yeoju	Yeoju Stadium	16,000

=== Personnel ===
Club	Manager
Busan IPark Futures	(South Korea) Kim Chi-gon
FC Chungju	(South Korea) Gong Moon-bae
Daegu FC B	
Daejeon Hana Citizen B	
Dangjin Citizen	(South Korea) Han Sang-min
Gangwon FC B	(South Korea) Lee Seul-gi
Geoje Citizen	(South Korea) Song Jae-gyu
Jeonbuk Hyundai Motors B	(South Korea) Park Jun-sub
Jeonju Citizen	(South Korea) Yang Young-cheol
Jinju Citizen	(South Korea) Choi Cheong-il
Pyeongchang United	(South Korea) An Hong-min
Pyeongtaek Citizen	(South Korea) Lee Ho-joon
Sejong Vanesse	
Seoul Jungnang	(South Korea) Kim Sang-hwa
Seoul Nowon United	(South Korea) Lee Jeong-jae
Yeoju FC	(South Korea) Shim Bong-seop

== League table ==
Pos	Team	Pld	W	D	L	GF	GA	GD	Pts	Qualification
1	Yeoju FC (C, P)	30	20	3	7	63	44	+19	63	Promotion to K3 League
2	Daegu FC B (P)	30	16	7	7	51	36	+15	55	Promotion to K3 League
3	Geoje Citizen	30	15	8	7	64	37	+27	53	Qualification for promotion play-offs
4	Jinju Citizen	30	16	4	10	45	37	+8	52	Qualification for promotion play-offs
5	Pyeongchang United	30	14	8	8	61	54	+7	50	
6	Jeonbuk Hyundai Motors B	30	14	7	9	59	45	+14	49	
7	Dangjin Citizen	30	15	4	11	52	43	+9	49	
8	Busan IPark Futures	30	12	7	11	51	40	+11	43	
9	FC Chungju	30	12	6	12	44	45	−1	42	
10	Pyeongtaek Citizen	30	10	10	10	55	54	+1	40	
11	Seoul Nowon United	30	10	5	15	49	60	−11	35	
12	Jeonju Citizen	30	8	10	12	45	46	−1	34	
13	Daejeon Hana Citizen B	30	8	6	16	37	62	−25	30	
14	Gangwon FC B	30	6	7	17	46	68	−22	25	
15	Seoul Jungnang	30	6	7	17	32	57	−25	25	
16	Sejong Vanesse	30	8	1	21	38	64	−26	25	

Source: JoinKFA
Rules for classification: 1) Points; 2) Goal difference; 3) Head-to-head points; 4) Goals scored; 5) Wins
(C) Champions; (P) Promoted

== Results ==
Home \ Away	BSI	CHC	DGU	DJN	DAN	GWO	GEO	JBK	JEO	JIN	PCH	PTA	SJV	SJN	SNU	YEO
Busan IPark Futures	—	0–1	1–1	4–1	1–2	3–1	1–2	2–0	1–0	0–1	1–1	1–1	2–0	2–0	1–1	2–1
FC Chungju	3–2	—	2–0	3–2	2–0	3–3	0–1	1–1	1–1	2–0	3–0	3–2	2–0	0–0	0–1	0–2
Daegu FC B	0–1	2–1	—	3–2	2–1	2–1	0–0	2–1	0–3	3–1	0–0	3–3	2–1	4–1	1–0	0–1
Daejeon FC B	0–2	1–0	3–1	—	0–2	0–0	0–0	2–1	2–2	0–1	0–2	0–0	2–1	1–2	2–0	1–3
Dangjin Citizen	2–1	1–1	2–3	5–0	—	1–0	0–2	0–1	2–2	1–1	0–4	4–2	2–0	2–0	0–1	4–1
Gangwon FC B	2–2	4–1	1–3	3–1	1–1	—	3–3	1–2	0–4	2–0	2–5	2–2	2–1	2–3	1–2	2–3
Geoje Citizen	4–0	2–3	0–0	3–0	6–0	2–0	—	3–4	1–1	4–1	3–0	2–0	4–1	1–1	0–0	1–1
Jeonbuk Hyundai Motors B	2–2	1–1	1–1	7–2	1–0	6–0	2–1	—	0–1	0–1	2–3	1–1	1–3	1–0	6–4	0–1
Jeonju Citizen	0–3	5–1	0–0	1–1	0–2	3–0 (Note: The KFA awarded Jeonju Citizen a 3–0 win due to the absence of Gangwon FC B, whose players were suffering from COVID-19.)	1–2	1–2	—	3–3	0–1	1–2	0–1	0–0	1–1	1–5
Jinju Citizen	1–0	2–1	0–2	2–0	3–0	2–1	3–2	0–1	2–0	—	2–4	0–1	2–0	2–2	3–0 (Note: The KFA awarded Jinju Citizen a 3–0 win due to Seoul Nowon United's withdrawal.)	2–2
Pyeongchang United	2–2	2–1	1–3	2–2	2–1	3–3	2–2	3–3	2–3	0–4	—	2–1	3–0	6–1	4–3	1–3
Pyeongtaek Citizen	3–2	2–1	2–5	3–2	1–2	1–3	6–1	2–3	3–3	1–2	1–1	—	4–2	2–1	3–0	1–4
Sejong Vanesse	0–5	2–1	3–4	1–2	2–4	0–1	2–1	2–4	4–2	3–1	2–0	1–1	—	0–1	3–1	0–3
Seoul Jungnang	3–1	2–3	0–3	1–2	2–3	3–2	2–4	0–4	0–2	0–1	1–2	0–0	2–1	—	1–1	1–2
Seoul Nowon United	3–5	1–2	2–1	5–2	0–3	2–1	0–4	3–0	3–4	0–1	4–1	2–2	2–1	2–2	—	3–1
Yeoju FC	2–1	3–1	1–0	4–5	1–5	4–2	2–1	3–3	1–0	2–1	1–2	0–1	3–1	1–0	2–1	—

Source: KFA Soccerway
Legend: Blue = home team win; Yellow = draw; Red = away team win.

== Promotion play-offs ==
=== Bracket ===
First round			Final
			K3	Changwon City	2
3	Geoje Citizen	1	K4	Jinju Citizen	0
4	Jinju Citizen	4

=== First round ===
18 November 2023
14:00 (UTC+9)

Geoje Citizen	1–4	Jinju Citizen
Lee Geon-young 3'		Lee Hyeon-il 28'; Lee Sang-jun 35'; Choi Ik-jin 65'; Kim Min-woo 79'

Geoje Stadium, Geoje

=== Final ===
The promotion play-offs final (K3 League relegation play-off) was contested between the 14th-placed team of K3 League and the winners of the first round.

25 November 2023
14:00 (UTC+9)

Changwon City	2–0	Jinju Citizen
Seong Bong-jae 53', 82'	Report

Changwon Stadium, Changwon

== See also ==
- 2023 in South Korean football
- 2023 Korean FA Cup
