= Yeoncheon FC =

South Korean football club

- Full name: Yeoncheon Football Club 연천FC
- Founded: 21 December 2017; 8 years ago (as Chungju Citizen FC)
- Ground: Yeoncheon Sports Complex
- Manager: Choi Jeong-min
- League: K4 League
- 2024: K4 League, 10th of 13
Home colours	Away colours

Yeoncheon FC (Korean: 연천 FC) is a semi-professional South Korean football club based in Yeoncheon County. The club competes in the K4 League, the fourth tier of South Korean football.

Before the 2025 season, the club was based in the city of Chungju and was named FC Chungju, but it relocated to Yeoncheon in December 2024.

== History ==
=== As Chungju Citizen FC ===
At the end of the 2016 season, Chungju Hummel, a professional team which played in the then K League Challenge, was disbanded, and in their absence, a new team, Chungju Citizen Football Club, was formed. The team was founded on 27 December 2017, but the founding ceremony was only held on 17 March 2018.

In their inaugural season, the team finished fourth in the K3 League Basic, qualifying for the promotion play-offs against Yangju Citizen. The match ended in a draw. According to the competition rules, the team that finished higher in the league was declared the winner, with Chungju promoted to the K3 League Advanced.

In their second season, competing in the K3 League Advanced, Chungju Citizen finished last. At the end of the season, the Korea Football Association (KFA) merged the K3 League and the Korea National League into a new semi-professional K3 and K4 league system. Chungju and other teams that finished in the bottom places of the K3 League Advanced joined teams from the K3 League Basic to form the new K4 League.

In their third season, which was their first in the newly formed K4 League, they finished ninth.

At the beginning of 2021, the team left Tangeumdae Stadium and moved to Chungju Sports Complex. In November of that year, they signed a youth agreement with Chungju Shinmyeong Middle School and adopted it as their youth team. The team finished the season in fourth place, qualifying for the promotion play-offs. The match against Dangjin Citizen finished in a draw and Chungju, as the lower-placed team in the league, failed to advance.

=== As FC Chungju ===
In October 2022, it was announced that the club would cease operations at the end of the season. A corporation was created to take over the football club and, now a private club, changed the name to FC Chungju. FC Chungju was not treated as a new club, but merely as the same club with a change of ownership, and the club was allowed to retain the history of Chungju Citizen. They finished the 2022 K4 League season in 15th place, third from the bottom.

During the 2023 season, the club found itself in financial difficulties, resulting in unpaid salaries and win bonuses, which led the players to publicly demand payment and call on the CEO to resign, announcing that they would not participate in training and boycott matches until he did so. There have also been allegations that CEO Shin Jong-soo spread rumors about the coach, coaching staff and players, and verbally abused players and staff. The KFA launched an investigation and eventually the ownership was suspended for six months. Part of the cause of the financial situation appears to have stemmed from the city's refusal to subsidize the team. The city's position was that the team lacked sufficient public support and was therefore of little benefit to citizens or to promoting the city's image. Despite the turmoil, FC Chungju managed to finish the 2023 K4 League season in ninth place, securing a mid-table spot.

FC Chungju finished tenth in the 2024 K4 League, but only two points behind the third-placed team. The team's owners were criticized for their lack of financial transparency in the 2024 season, and the city demanded improvements in this regard. When the club failed to meet its obligations, the city refused to renew the stadium contract, and the team faced the possibility of expulsion from the league if it did not find a new home ground.

On 20 December 2024, an operating agreement was signed with the council of Yeoncheon County in Gyeonggi Province, and the club was relocated to Yeoncheon and renamed Yeoncheon FC.

== Season-by-season records ==
=== As Chungju Citizen / FC Chungju ===
Season	Teams	Tier	Placement	Pld	W	D	L	GF	GA	GD	Pts	FA Cup	Notes
2018	11	K3 Basic	3rd	20	13	1	6	46	17	+29	40	Third round	
2019	12	K3 Advanced	12th	22	3	3	16	17	40	–23	2	Third round	10 point deducted
2020	13	K4 League	10th	24	5	4	15	24	45	–21	19	Second round	
2021	16	K4 League	4th	30	17	6	7	60	31	+29	57	First round	
2022	17	K4 League	15th	32	9	2	21	33	65	–32	29	First round	
2023	16	K4 League	9th	30	12	6	12	44	45	–1	42	First round	
2024	13	K4 League	10th	24	10	4	10	43	43	0	32	First round	2 point deducted

=== As Yeoncheon FC ===
Season	Teams	Tier	Placement	Pld	W	D	L	GF	GA	GD	Pts	FA Cup
2025	11	K4 League										First round

== See also ==
- List of football clubs in South Korea
