= 2021 K3 League =

K3 League
- Season: 2021
- Dates: Regular season: 13 March – 13 November 2021; Championship: 17–27 November 2021
- Champions: Gimpo FC (1st title)
- Promoted: Gimpo FC
- Relegated: Pyeongtaek Citizen
- Matches: 214
- Goals: 479 (2.24 per match)
- Best Player: Kim Jong-seok
- Top goalscorer: Kim Jong-seok (15 goals)

The 2021 K3 League was the second season of the K3 League as a semi-professional league in South Korea. The 15 participating teams played each other twice, and the lowest placed team was relegated to the K4 League.

== Teams ==
=== Team changes ===
Relegated to K4 League

- Chuncheon Citizen
- Jeonju Citizen

Promoted from K4 League

- Paju Citizen
- Ulsan Citizen

Withdrawn

- Gyeongju Citizen

=== Stadiums and locations ===
Club	City	Stadium	Capacity
Busan Transportation Corporation	Busan	Busan Gudeok Stadium	24,363
Changwon City	Changwon	Changwon Football Center	15,116
Cheonan City	Cheonan	Cheonan Football Center	15,500
Cheongju FC	Cheongju	Cheongju Stadium	17,264
Daejeon Korail	Daejeon	Daejeon Hanbat Sports Complex	17,371
Gangneung City	Gangneung	Gangneung Stadium	33,000
Gimhae FC	Gimhae	Gimhae Public Stadium	25,000
Gimpo FC	Gimpo	Gimpo Stadium	1,024
Gyeongju KHNP	Gyeongju	Gyeongju Civic Stadium	12,199
Hwaseong FC	Hwaseong	Hwaseong Stadium	35,270
FC Mokpo	Mokpo	Mokpo International Football Center	5,952
Paju Citizen	Paju	Paju Public Stadium	23,000
Pyeongtaek Citizen	Pyeongtaek	Sosabeol Reports Town	15,000
Ulsan Citizen	Ulsan	Ulsan Stadium	19,471
Yangju Citizen	Yangju	Godeok Artificial Turf Ground	5,000

=== Foreign players ===
Club	Player 1	Player 2	Player 3	AFC player	Former players
Changwon City	(Japan) Takuma Ishibashi				
Cheonan City	(Netherlands) Jerry van Ewijk				
Cheongju FC	(Indonesia) Muhammad Iqbal				
Gimhae FC	(Brazil) Rafael Ramazotti	(Brazil) Lucas Willian	(Brazil) Luan Costa		
Gimpo Citizen	(Japan) Ayumu Tachibana				
Pyeongtaek Citizen	(The Gambia) Abdoulie Gomez				
Ulsan Citizen	(South Sudan) Martin Sawi	(South Sudan) Paul Puk Kun Pal			

== League table ==
Pos	Team	Pld	W	D	L	GF	GA	GD	Pts	Qualification or relegation
1	Cheonan City	28	16	6	6	50	25	+25	54	Qualification for Championship final
2	Gimpo FC (C, P)	28	14	10	4	35	20	+15	52	Qualification for Championship semi-final and K League 2
3	Mokpo City	28	14	8	6	34	23	+11	50	Qualification for Championship first round
4	Gyeongju KHNP	28	13	7	8	39	30	+9	46	Qualification for Championship first round
5	Gimhae FC	28	12	8	8	39	35	+4	44	
6	Busan Transportation Corporation	28	11	8	9	32	33	−1	41	
7	Ulsan Citizen	28	9	11	8	32	24	+8	38	
8	Changwon City	28	9	11	8	28	27	+1	38	
9	Daejeon Korail	28	8	12	8	32	30	+2	36	
10	Paju Citizen	28	8	11	9	32	36	−4	35	
11	Cheongju FC	28	9	7	12	37	39	−2	34	
12	Hwaseong FC	28	8	10	10	29	34	−5	34	
13	Gangneung City	28	4	8	16	23	42	−19	20	
14	Yangju Citizen	28	4	8	16	17	43	−26	20	
15	Pyeongtaek Citizen (R)	28	5	7	16	20	38	−18	2	Relegation to K4 League

Source: Soccerway Flashscore
Rules for classification: 1) Points; 2) Goal difference; 3) Goals scored; 4) Wins
(C) Champions; (P) Promoted; (R) Relegated

== Results ==
=== Matches 1–28 ===
Home \ Away	CHC	GIM	MOK	BTC	GYE	GIH	ULS	CHA	HWA	PCI	DKO	CHE	YJU	PTA	GNE
Cheonan City	—	0–1	0–0	2–1	0–2	2–1	1–0	0–1	3–0	2–2	2–3	3–0	3–0	2–1	2–0
Gimpo FC	3–2	—	2–1	1–2	1–0	1–2	2–2	2–2	1–0	3–1	1–1	2–0	2–0	3–0	0–0
FC Mokpo	2–1	1–1	—	2–0	1–1	0–0	3–2	1–1	1–0	0–1	1–0	1–2	2–0	2–0	0–0
Busan Transportation Corporation	2–2	0–0	2–0	—	1–3	2–1	1–1	1–1	1–1	1–2	0–1	1–1	2–1	1–0	2–1
Gyeongju KHNP	0–2	0–0	2–0	1–0	—	2–0	2–2	0–2	1–0	4–2	1–1	1–2	1–0	3–2	1–1
Gimhae FC	1–5	1–1	0–1	1–1	3–1	—	1–0	1–0	1–1	0–1	3–3	1–0	3–0	3–1	5–2
Ulsan Citizen	1–2	0–1	1–0	0–1	1–1	0–0	—	2–0	1–1	4–1	1–1	0–0	2–0	1–0	4–0
Changwon City	1–1	2–3	1–3	1–0	0–0	1–2	1–0	—	2–2	1–1	3–1	0–1	0–1	0–0	1–0
Hwaseong FC	0–3	0–1	2–3	1–2	2–3	1–0	1–0	0–0	—	1–1	1–0	1–0	3–2	1–0	1–0
Paju Citizen	0–1	0–1	0–1	2–0	2–1	1–2	0–0	0–1	1–1	—	0–0	2–2	0–3	2–1	2–1
Daejeon Korail	1–1	2–0	0–1	5–1	1–3	0–0	1–1	0–2	2–0	2–2	—	1–0	0–0	0–0	1–0
Cheongju FC	0–2	0–0	1–2	1–3	1–2	3–0	2–2	3–0	3–3	0–2	1–3	—	2–0	0–3	2–1
Yangju Citizen	0–0	0–0	2–1	1–1	0–2	1–2	0–1	1–1	0–3	1–1	3–1	0–6	—	0–1	1–1
Pyeongtaek Citizen	1–4	1–0	0–2	0–2	1–0	2–3	0–1	1–1	1–1	0–2	0–0	2–2	0–0	—	2–1
Gangneung City	1–2	0–2	1–1	0–1	2–1	2–2	1–2	0–2	1–1	1–1	2–1	1–2	2–0	1–0	—

Source: Soccerway
Legend: Blue = home team win; Yellow = draw; Red = away team win.

== Championship play-offs ==
When the first round and semi-final matches were finished as draws, their winners were decided on the regular season rankings without extra time and the penalty shoot-out.

=== Bracket ===
First round
3	Mokpo City	1
4	Gyeongju KHNP	1

Semi-final
2	Gimpo FC	2
3	Mokpo City	0

Final
Gimpo FC	1	2	3
1	Cheonan City	0	2	2

=== First round ===
17 November 2021
14:00 (UTC+9)

Mokpo City	1–1	Gyeongju KHNP
Kim Dong-wook 54'		Shin Young-jun 49'

Mokpo International Football Centre, Mokpo

=== Semi-final ===
20 November 2021
14:00 (UTC+9)

Gimpo FC	2–0	Mokpo City
Son Seok-yong 35', 78'

Gimpo Solteo Sports Park, Gimpo

=== Final ===
24 November 2021
14:00 (UTC+9)

Gimpo FC	1–0	Cheonan City
Yoon Min-ho 83'

Gimpo Solteo Sports Park, Gimpo

27 November 2021
14:00 (UTC+9)

Cheonan City	2–2	Gimpo FC
Jo Ju-young 28'; Lee Ye-chan 58'	Report	Jeong Eui-chan 90+1'; Park Gyeong-rok 90+4'

Cheonan Stadium, Cheonan

Gimpo FC won 3–2 on aggregate.

== See also ==
- 2021 in South Korean football
- 2021 Korean FA Cup
