= Gijang United FC =

Association football club in the South Korea

- Full name: Gijang United Football Club^{a} 기장군민축구단
- Founded: 9 January 2025; 13 months ago
- Ground: Jeongwan Sports Healing Park
- Capacity: 2200
- Owner: Gijang County Council
- Chairman: Jeong Jong-bok (Governor of Gijang County)
- Manager: Choi Jin-han
- League: K4 League
- Website: gijangunited.com
Home colours	Away colours

Gijang United FC (Korean: 기장군민축구단) commonly known as Gijang United is a semi-professional South Korean football club based in Gijang County, Busan. The club was founded in 2025 and plays in the K4 League, the fourth tier of football in South Korea.

The team in unusual for a semi-professional or professional team in Korea in that they only recruit players with strong local ties. According to their 2026 recruitment notice, players must meet at least one of three requirements before consideration for the team:

1. Was born in Gijang County
2. Graduated elementary, middle or high school in Gijang County
3. Have a parent who've lived in Gijang County for at least three years at the time of recruitment.

Also unusual about the team is that their emblem displays the English language name Gijang United FC, but their registered Korean name translates to Gijang Citizen FC.

== History ==
=== Founding ===
The team was officially established on 9 January 2025 and started the process of recruiting coaching staff and playing staff on 15 January 2025. The inauguration ceremony was only held on 21 March 2025, a day before their first home march.

The club announced the appointment of their first manager, Choi Jin-han, on the 7 February 2025 and made their squad list public on 20 February.

=== Inaugural season ===
The club's first official match was played on 22 February 2025, an away loss to Jinju Citizen FC. Their first home game in the K4 League was on Sunday, 30 March 2025, a 3-1 win against Yeoncheon FC. Although their first victory, it was their first league points as a club.

Gijang United FC's first official victory came in Round 1 of the Korea Cup against K5 League's Hyochang FC. They exited the tournament when they suffered a decisive defeat in Round 2 against Gimpo FC. On 28 May 2025 Gijang United earned the right to represent Busan in the National Sports Festival by beating them 2-0 at home.

Although the team started the season slowly, they gained momentum and had the best second half record in the league. Before losing their final two matches, they managed to play 7 matches, recording 6 wins and a draw. Most of those matches were against the then title contenders. In a tight league table, the finished fifth, just two points behind the champions.

== Players ==
=== Current squad ===
As of 18 March 2025

Note: Flags indicate national team as defined under FIFA eligibility rules; some limited exceptions apply. Players may hold more than one non-FIFA nationality.

No.	Pos.	Nation	Player
3	DF	KOR	Son Seung-hyeon
4	DF	KOR	Bang Woo-jin
5	DF	KOR	Lee Ju-seong
6	DF	KOR	An Sang-jin
8	MF	KOR	Sin Yun-ho
11	FW	KOR	Kim Gyeong-gu
13	GK	KOR	Kim Min-geun
14	DF	KOR	Jeon Hyo-seok (captain)
17	MF	KOR	Lee Jang-hyeon
19	DF	KOR	Choi Hyeon-bin

No.	Pos.	Nation	Player
20	DF	KOR	Gong Ho-won
21	MF	KOR	Kim Min-jae
22	DF	KOR	Lee Sang-jin
23	MF	KOR	Yun Ju-hun
25	GK	KOR	Kim Eun-do
44	MF	KOR	No Seung-gi
70	MF	KOR	Kim Dae-won
71	GK	KOR	Kim Min-gyeol
72	DF	KOR	Kim Jeong-su

== Notes ==
^a Even thought their Emblem displays Gijang United, the teams's Korean name translate to Gijang Citizen Football Club.
