= Siheung Citizen FC =

South Korean football club

Siheung City
- Full name: Siheung City Football Club 시흥시민축구단
- Short name: SHC
- Founded: 24 October 2015; 11 years ago
- Ground: Jeongwang Sports Park
- Capacity: 1,500
- Owner: Lim Byeong-taek
- Chairman: Park Sang-ho
- Manager: Lee Seung-hee (caretaker)
- League: K3 League
- 2026: 1st of 14 (Champions)
- Website: fcsiheung.com
Home colours	Away colours

Siheung City Football Club (Korean: 시흥 시민 축구단) is a semi-professional South Korean football club based in Siheung, Gyeonggi Province. The club was founded in 2015 and plays in the K3 League, the third tier of football in South Korea.

== History ==
In 2012, it was announced that Siheung City was working on a project to sign an agreement with K Company, a partner of FC Barcelona, to establish an academy in the city. The plans fell through in 2013, and in 2015 the funds of the failed project were allocated for use in the creation of a citizen's football club.

On August 3, 2015, the 'Citizen Football Club Promotion and For-profit Corporation Establishment Preparatory Committee' was formed, and on September 17 they chose to emulate Spanish club Atlético de Madrid. This explains the similarities in club emblems. On 24 October 2015, the club was established.

=== Controversies ===
During the founding preparations, the company with whom the club was working, removed themselves and the city replaced them with two new companies. This move was controversial because one company acted as the city treasurer, and the other was planning to open a department store in the city.

The club faced further criticism for using taxpayer money earmarked for the youth team, to pay a large wage bill of a club that did not even have players. Much of that money went towards paying the wage for the new Spanish coach.

On 14 October 2015, council member Jo Wook-hee was elected as the club's CEO, a move which sparked outrage because the club was established as a for-profit organisation, violating laws that prevent council members from engaging in commercial business transactions involving city funds. Further outrage stemmed from the fact that his son was selected as a member of the team.

=== Kike Liñero Era (2015-2016) ===
Kike Liñero of Spain, former Athletic Bilbao and FC Seoul youth teams coach, was the club's first manager. During 2015, he helped lay the groundwork for the team with club promotion, community relations, and youth development activities. He was in charge of only a single playing season, after which he returned to Athletic Bilbao to take a position as Chief Scout.

=== Gléguer Zorzin Era (2017-2018) ===
Gléguer Zorzin from Brazil, Kike Liñero Assistant Manager, took the reins in 2017 and led the team to second place in the K3 League Basic, the lower division of the restructured K3 League. They went one better in 2018 and won the league, gaining automatic promotion to the K3 League Advance.^{[a]}

=== Jeong Seon-uh (2019-2020) ===
In 2019 Jeong Seon-uh took over as manager. The club finished safely in mid-table, but the Korea Football Association implemented their plan to combine the National League and the K3 league, and two new leagues, the K3 League and K4 League were formed. Siheung City FC was placed in the lower decision, the K4 League.

=== Park Seung-soo (2021–current) ===
Park Seung-soo joined the team in 2021. Siheung City FC would be his first senior team, having previously managed at the Middle School, High School and University levels. He led the team to promotion in his first season, followed by a top-half finish every season, including the 2024 K3 League title.

=== Korean FA Cup ===
Throughout the history of the club, the team found relative success in the cup tournament only once, when they reached the third round in 2018. During the remaining seasons they were either knocked out in the first round, or the second round, to which 3rd Division teams usually gained automatic entry.

== Season-by-season records ==
Season	Teams	Tier	Placement	Pld	W	D	L	GF	GA	GD	Pts	FA Cup	Manager
2016	20	K3 League	12th	19	8	2	9	32	40	–8	26	First round	Kike Linero
2017	9	K3 Basic	2nd^{[a]}	16	13	0	3	32	17	+15	39	First round	Gléguer Zorzin
2018	11	K3 Basic	1st^{[a]}	20	15	1	4	40	10	+30	46	Third round	Gléguer Zorzin
2019	12	K3 Advanced	7th	22	8	5	9	22	25	–3	29	Second round	Jeong Seon-uh
2020	13	K4 League	8th	24	8	5	11	35	31	+4	29	Second round	Jeong Seon-uh
2021	16	K4 League	2nd	30	21	4	5	75	32	+43	67	Second round	Park Seung-soo
2022	16	K3 League	5th	30	13	7	10	40	34	+6	46	Second round	Park Seung-soo
2023	15	K3 League	6th	28	10	9	9	37	36	+1	39	Second round	Park Seung-soo
2024	16	K3 League	1st	30	18	6	6	60	27	+33	60	Second round	Park Seung-soo
2025	15	K3 League	2nd	28	17	6	5	45	25	+20	57	Round of 16	Park Seung-soo
2026	14	K3 League	1st	26	17	6	3	38	32	+6	57	Third round	Lee Seung-hee (caretaker)
2027	TBD	K3 League			-	-	-	-	-	-	-	TBD	Lee Seung-hee

^a League tables for K3 League Basic 2017-2019 do not seem to exist outside the Wikipedia articles for those seasons.

== Current squad ==
As of 7 May 2025

Note: Flags indicate national team as defined under FIFA eligibility rules; some limited exceptions apply. Players may hold more than one non-FIFA nationality.

No.	Pos.	Nation	Player
1	GK	KOR	Choi Jin-baek
2	DF	KOR	Choi Chang-won
3	DF	KOR	Kim Nam-seong
4	MF	KOR	Kim Hyo-chan
5	DF	KOR	Shim Min-yong
6	MF	KOR	Hwang Sin-jung
7	MF	KOR	Yoo Ji-min
8	MF	KOR	Ahn Soo-min
9	FW	JPN	Tanaka Haruto
10	MF	KOR	Lee Ji-hong
11	DF	KOR	Ju Jong-dae
12	MF	KOR	Park Han-gyeol
13	GK	KOR	Kim Deok-soo
14	DF	KOR	Ryu Seung-beom
15	DF	KOR	Yeo Jae-wook
16	MF	KOR	Lee Eun-jae
17	FW	KOR	Lee Gyu-ha
18	FW	KOR	Jo Hyun-do
19	FW	KOR	Song Hyeok
20	DF	KOR	Kim Jin-hyuk
21	FW	KOR	Kim Yeong-hwan
22	DF	KOR	Lee Nam-gyu
23	FW	KOR	Seo Seon-woong

No.	Pos.	Nation	Player
26	FW	KOR	Yu Shin
28	MF	KOR	Shin Hyo-jae
29	FW	KOR	Choi Sung-gwang
30	MF	KOR	Jung Chul-woong
31	DF	KOR	Han Seung-won
32	FW	KOR	Seo Yu-min
33	DF	KOR	Jeon Seong-min (On loan from Suwon Bluewings)
34	FW	KOR	Park Sung-gyeol
36	GK	KOR	Kim Dong-gun
37	FW	KOR	Yoon Young-jin
38	MF	KOR	Kim Min-seong
47	MF	KOR	Park Se-min
66	DF	KOR	An Ji-ho
70	FW	KOR	Min Dong-hoo
71	MF	KOR	Jeoung Hyun-woo
77	MF	KOR	Choi Jong-won
81	FW	KOR	Kim Tae-heon
88	DF	KOR	Bak Tae-geon
93	FW	KOR	Oh Sung-jin
97	MF	KOR	Lee Rae-jun
98	DF	KOR	Na Jun-yeong
99	FW	BRA	Sandy

== Honours ==
=== Domestic competition ===
==== League ====
- K3 League Basic
  - Champions (1): 2018
  - Runner-up (1): 2017
- K3 League
  - Champions (2): 2024, 2026
  - Runner-up (1): 2025
- K4 League
  - Runner-up (1): 2022

== See also ==
- List of football clubs in South Korea
