= Pyeongtaek Citizen FC =

- Full name: Pyeongtaek Citizen Football Club 평택 시티즌 축구단
- Founded: 2017; 9 years ago
- Ground: Sosabel Sports Town
- Capacity: 12,738
- Owner: Lee Ho-jun
- Chairman: Yoon Sang-chul
- Coach: Yoon Sang-chul
- League: K4 League
- 2024: K4 League, 12th
Home colours	Away colours

Pyeongtaek Citizen Football Club (Korean: 평택 시티즌 FC) is a semi-professional South Korean football club based in Pyeongtaek, Gyeonggi-do. The club was founded in 2017 and plays in the K4 League, the fourth tier of football in South Korea.

== Current squad ==
As of 13 February 2025

Note: Flags indicate national team as defined under FIFA eligibility rules; some limited exceptions apply. Players may hold more than one non-FIFA nationality.

No.	Pos.	Nation	Player
1	GK	KOR	Kwon Tae-wook
2	DF	KOR	Lee Woong-hee
3	DF	KOR	Jeong Hee-seong
4	DF	KOR	Shim Yeong-seo
5	DF	KOR	Lee Hyo-jun
6	MF	KOR	Jeong Min-ui
7	MF	KOR	Jeong Hyeon-woo
8	MF	KOR	Ha Geum-seong
9	FW	KOR	Go Byeong-beom (vice-captain)
10	MF	KOR	Choi Seong-ho (captain)
11	DF	KOR	Lee Seung-ho
13	MF	KOR	Kim Yoon-gyeom
14	MF	KOR	Kwon Jae-geon
15	MF	KOR	Hwang Geon
16	FW	KOR	Song Ho-jun
17	MF	KOR	Jeon Tae-eun
18	GK	KOR	Park Ji-hyeon
19	MF	KOR	Jang Woo-jin
20	MF	KOR	Jin Hyeon-jun

No.	Pos.	Nation	Player
21	MF	KOR	Lee Chae-woon
22	DF	KOR	Lee Jun-gi
23	FW	KOR	Choi Eric
24	DF	KOR	Kim Hee- mang
27	FW	KOR	Kim Yeong-ryun
29	FW	KOR	Ahn Eun-san
30	FW	KOR	Lee Geon-hyeong
33	DF	KOR	Yoon Dae -ho
41	GK	KOR	Lee Gyeong-min
47	FW	KOR	Jo Woong-gi
50	DF	KOR	Park Jong-min
55	MF	KOR	Shin Hee-jun
66	MF	KOR	Shin Tae-young
70	FW	KOR	Kim Jin-young
76	DF	KOR	Lee Su-han
77	DF	KOR	Jeon Jeong-ho
79	FW	KOR	Kim Seon-cheol
88	DF	KOR	Choi Jin-yeol
99	FW	KOR	Park Joong-hyun

== Season-by-season records ==
Season	Teams	Tier	Placement	Pld	W	D	L	GF	GA	GD	Pts	FA Cup	Notes
2017	9	K3 Basic	3rd	16	8	3	5	38	26	+12	27	First round	Gained promotion via the playoffs
2018	12	K3 Advanced	9th	22	7	4	11	28	34	–6	25	Third Round	
2019	12	K3 Advanced	11th	22	3	2	17	23	47	–24	11	First round	
2020	16	K3 League	12th	22	6	5	11	24	40	-16	23	First round	
2021	15	K3 League	15th	28	5	7	16	20	38	-18	2	Second round	20 point deduction for non-payment of wages; Relegation
2022	17	K4 League	14th	32	9	7	16	42	54	-12	55	First round	
2023	17	K4 League	10th	30	9	10	10	52	52	+0	37	Second round	
2024	13	K4 League	12th	24	6	7	11	39	35	+5	25	Second round	
