= Seoul Jungnang FC =

- Full name: Seoul Jungnang Football Club 서울 중랑 축구단
- Founded: 27 February 2012; 14 years ago as Jungnang Chorus Mustang FC
- Ground: Jungnang District Field
- Capacity: 400
- Owner: Law Firm Chorus
- Chairman: Lee Min-geol
- Manager: Lee Yong-wook
- League: K4 League
- 2024: 11th of 13
- Website: fcjungnang.com
Home colours	Away colours

Seoul Jungnang Football Club (Korean: 서울 중랑 축구단) is a semi-professional South Korean football club based in Jungnang-gu, Seoul.

The club was founded in 2012 and plays in the K4 League, the fourth tier of football in South Korea.

== History ==
=== The early years ===
In 1982, Lee Min-geol, an attorney who played football in middle school, started an early morning soccer club in Myeonmok-dong, Seoul. He named the club Aram Football Club, and they participated in the Seoul City Office Workers' Football. In 1992, on the 10th anniversary of the club, its name was changed to Mustang Football Club.

From the start, the club was focused on the love of football, not on competitive achievements. It was not uncommon for members of the club to use their own money to support other players' participation. In 1997, they started an independent youth club and ran youth tournaments to support youth football development.

In 2002 the team started competing in the Puma Cup Footy League, which would later become the Connie Green Cup, the predecessor to the amateur K3 League. During this period the club was briefly named Dongdaemun Mustang Football Club, but when Myeonmok-dong was incorporated into Jungnang-gu, the team name naturally became Jungnang Mustang Football Club.

Lee Min-geol had dreams of playing on a bigger stage and giving player who failed during their youth careers another chance at professional football. In 2011 he teamed up with Park Hyung-yeon, fellow football lover and head of the Chorus Law Firm, to push for entry in the K3 Challengers League.

=== Jungnang Mustang Chorus Football Club ===
The predecessors to the current club were an important part of the team's history, but officially the team was founded on 28 February 2012 as Jungnang Chorus Mustang Football Club. Staying with their goal of providing a home for player who failed in other areas, the team raised eyebrows by refusing to recruit professional players doing their military civil service, and focused on recruiting high school graduates from and university dropouts.

The club's first season could be considered a failure, finishing 16th out of 18 teams. But the owners were adamant that the team was focused on development, and players should enjoy football instead of worrying about winning.

In the years since, the team has had only one season successful competitive season. However, the focus of the team never shifted and as late as 2023, Lee Min-geol still maintained that the clubs is focused on player development over team success in competitions.

In 2017 the team changed their name to the simpler Seoul Jungnang Football Club, but the club emblem still displays the original name.

== Honours ==
- K3 League Basic
  - Winners (1): 2017

== Season-by-season records ==
Season	Teams	League	Position	Pld	W	D	L	GF	GA	GD	Pts	Korea Cup	Notes
2012	18	K3 Challengers League	7th in Group A	25	6	2	17	33	75	–42	20	DNQ	
2013	18	K3 Challengers League	7th in Group B	25	6	4	15	38	68	–30	22	DNQ	
2014	18	K3 Challengers League	3rd in Group A	25	14	6	5	53	28	+25	48	Round of 32	Championship Playoffs, 1st Round
2015	18	K3 League	4th in Group B	25	12	2	11	48	37	+11	38	Third Round	
2016	20	K3 League	13th	19	6	4	9	25	27	–2	22	Second Round	Relegation
2017	9	K3 League Basic^{[a]}	1st	16	12	4	0	43	12	+31	40	Second Round	League Champions, Automatic Promotion
2018	12	K3 League Advanced	12th	22	3	1	18	23	74	–51	10	Third Round	Relegation
2019	8	K3 League Basic^{[a]}	5th	21	6	1	14	25	40	–15	19	First Round	
2020	13	K4 League	13th	24	2	5	17	22	57	–35	11	First Round	
2021	16	K4 League	14th	30	6	7	17	33	62	–29	25	First Round	
2022	17	K4 League	13th	32	11	4	17	38	46	-8	37	Second Round	
2023	16	K4 League	15th	30	6	7	17	32	57	-25	25	Second Round	
2024	13	K4 League	11th	24	8	6	10	34	38	-4	26	First Round	Received 4 point deduction

^a League tables for K3 League Basic do not seem to exist outside the Wikipedia articles for those seasons.

== Current squad ==
As of February 2025

Note: Flags indicate national team as defined under FIFA eligibility rules; some limited exceptions apply. Players may hold more than one non-FIFA nationality.

No.	Pos.	Nation	Player
1	GK	KOR	Kwon Jae-hyeon
2	DF	PRK	Hyeong Kim-Su
3	MF	KOR	Lee Dong-hyeon
4	DF	KOR	Kim Kang-yeon
5	MF	KOR	Kim Eui-young
6	FW	KOR	Jeong Dae-hyeon
7	MF	KOR	Ju Han-seong
9	FW	KOR	Yun Tae-woong
10	FW	KOR	Bak Kwan-woo
12	MF	KOR	Bak Tae-jin
13	FW	KOR	Lee Min-jun
14	FW	KOR	Kim Sang-gyeom
15	DF	KOR	Heo Jun-yeong
17	DF	KOR	Kim Gi-hun
18	DF	KOR	Kang Sang-hee
19	DF	KOR	An Gi-hun
20	DF	KOR	Kim Joo-hyeong
21	DF	KOR	Jeon Byeong-hun
22	FW	KOR	Kwon Yong-ju
23	FW	KOR	Kim Min-seo
24	MF	KOR	Jeong Won-jae
25	DF	KOR	Park Young-min

No.	Pos.	Nation	Player
26	DF	KOR	Lee Yeon-gyu
29	DF	KOR	Kim Jun-hyeong
30	DF	KOR	Lee Ji-hun
31	GK	KOR	Kang Seong-hyeok
33	MF	KOR	Kim Jin-uk
34	DF	KOR	Kim Jae-Hyeok
38	DF	KOR	Bak dong-hui
39	FW	KOR	Jeong Jin-ho
40	GK	KOR	Lee Gyeong-tae
42	DF	KOR	Choi Ji-su
44	MF	KOR	Choi Min-seo
47	FW	KOR	Bak Jae-hyeon
72	FW	KOR	Kim Dong-Ryeol
76	DF	KOR	Lee Byeong-jin
77	FW	KOR	Byeon Jae-young
80	MF	KOR	Jeon Byeong-jin
88	FW	KOR	Kim Min-Uk
90	DF	KOR	Lee Yu-jae
91	GK	KOR	Kim Jae-min
97	FW	KOR	Moon Seong-min
99	GK	KOR	Han Dong-jun
