= Jeonju Citizen FC =

South Korean football club

- Full name: Jeonju Citizen Football Club 전주 시민 축구단
- Founded: 2007; 19 years ago
- Ground: Jeonju Stadium
- Capacity: 30,000
- Coach: Yang Young-cheol
- League: K4 League
- 2023: K4 League, 12th
- Website: http://www.전주시민축구단.kr
Home colours	Away colours

Jeonju Citizen Football Club (Korean: 전주 시민 축구단) is a South Korean football club based in the city of Jeonju. It currently plays in the K4 League, the fourth tier of league football in South Korea.

== Season-by-season records ==
Season	League										FA Cup
Season	Tier	Pld	W	D	L	GF	GA	GD	Pts	Pos.	FA Cup
2007	3	18	7	8	3	40	20	+20	29	5	—
2008	3	29	11	6	12	54	50	+4	39	10	2R
2009	3	32	13	6	13	59	42	+17	45	11	—
2010	3	25	14	2	9	52	34	+18	44	8	—
2011	3	22	7	8	7	29	34	–5	29	9	1R
2012	3	25	8	4	13	51	55	–4	28	12↓	—
2013	4	25	12	4	9	47	42	+5	40	8	Ro32
2014	4	25	10	7	8	49	33	+16	37	9	1R
2015	4	25	8	3	14	43	54	–11	26 (Note: Deducted one point.)	12	3R
2016	4	19	11	4	4	36	24	+12	37	4	2R
2017	4	22	7	5	10	30	36	–6	26	9	Ro32
2018	4	22	5	1	16	25	46	–21	16	11↓	3R
2019	5	21	15	4	2	56	22	+34	49	2↑	3R
2020	3	22	3	4	15	19	39	-19	13	16↓	2R
2021	4	30	7	3	20	39	71	-32	24	15	2R
2022	4	30	13	7	12	53	55	-2	46	9	
2023	4	30	8	10	12	45	46	-1	34	12	

Key

- W = Winner
- RU = Runners-up
- SF = Semi-Final
- QF = Quarter-final
- Ro16 = Round of 16
- Ro32 = Round of 32
- GS = Group Stage
