= Pyeongchang United FC =

South Korean football club

- Full name: Pyeongchang United Football Club 평창 유나이티드 축구단
- Founded: 10 November 2020; 5 years ago
- Ground: Jinbu Sports Park Football Stadium, Pyeongchang
- Capacity: 300
- Owner: Pyeongchang County
- Chairman: Jeong Jeong-taek (Pyeongchang County Sports Association)
- Manager: Shin Gi-Dong
- League: K4 League
- 2024: K4 League, 9th of 13
Home colours	Away colours

Pyeongchang United Football Club (Korean: 평창 유나이티드 FC) is a semi-professional South Korean football club based in Pyeongchang County, Gangwon-do. The club was founded in 2021 and plays in the K4 League, the fourth tier of football in South Korea.

== History ==
=== Inaugural Season ===
On 19 November 2020 it was reported that Pyeongchang council was preparing to enter a team in to the 2021 K4 League season, and on 10 November 2020 it was announced that the team had been founded. Their inaugural season was unremarkable and they finished 7th, comfortably in the top half of the league table.

=== 2022 Season ===
Pyeongchang United's second season saw them finish 4th in the league and qualify for the promotion play-offs. They failed to beat Chuncheon Citizen, who ultimately won the play-offs to gain promotion to the K3 League. In the Hana 1Q FA Cup Pyeongchang United reached Round 3 by beating K League 2 side Ansan Greeners., where they were knocked out by Daejeon Korail after extra time.

=== 2023 Season ===
The season was less successful than the previous. They narrowly missed qualifying for the promotion play-off, and exited the Hana 1Q FA Cup in the second round.

=== 2024 Season ===
2024 saw their lowest ever league finish. However, the final league table was so tight that there was only a two point difference between 3rd and 10th place.

=== 2025 Season ===
Prior to the start of the 2025 season, arguably the leagues' most notable signing, Hwang Mun-ki, joined Pyeongchang United. Hwang Mun-ki was a first team regular at K League 1's Gangwon FC, was included in the K League 1 team of the year, and had recent national team appearances. He joined on loan while he finishes his term of military/civil service.

The season looked to start off slow, but after 5 matches the team was still undefeated and in second place. They also had another noteworthy Korean FA Cup result when they beat Gyeongnam of K League 2, but in Round 3 they were defeated by K League 2 Incheon United FC.

== Current squad ==
As of 12 February 2025

Note: Flags indicate national team as defined under FIFA eligibility rules; some limited exceptions apply. Players may hold more than one non-FIFA nationality.

No.	Pos.	Nation	Player
1	GK	KOR	No Seung-jun
2	DF	KOR	Lee Jae-geun
4	DF	KOR	Kim Jae-hyeon
7	MF	KOR	Yang Jun-hyeok
9	FW	KOR	Shim Yun-gi
10	MF	KOR	Kim Yong-tae
11	FW	KOR	Jo Min-seong
13	DF	KOR	Kim Yeon-su
14	MF	KOR	Oh Hyeong-taek
15	MF	KOR	Lee Seung-jae
17	FW	KOR	Jeong Seong-jun
18	DF	KOR	Choi Hyeon-min
19	DF	KOR	Jeong Jae-hun
21	GK	KOR	Yoo Jong-min
22	DF	KOR	Yang Geun-ho

No.	Pos.	Nation	Player
23	DF	KOR	Lee Jae-yong
26	MF	KOR	Gang Yong-seok
27	DF	KOR	Im Seong-yun
30	DF	KOR	Lee Hyeon-jo
31	FW	KOR	Yoo Jae-ma
32	DF	KOR	Lee Byeong-wook
33	MF	KOR	Kang Yun-gu
37	FW	KOR	Jeon Hyeong-geun
39	DF	KOR	Bak Jin-seong
42	FW	KOR	Sin Ji-hun
47	FW	KOR	Kim Su-seong
77	MF	KOR	Lee Jeong-yun
88	MF	KOR	Hwang Mun-ki
91	MF	KOR	Kim Geon-woo

=== Retired number(s) ===
12 – Fans of the club (the 12th Man)

== Managerial history ==
Dates	Name	Notes
2021-2024	(South Korea) Ahn Hong-min	
2025	(South Korea) Shin Gi-Dong	

== Season by season ==
Season	Teams	League	Placement	Pld	W	D	L	GF	GA	GD	Pts	Korean FA Cup	Notes
2021	16	K4 League	7th	30	14	4	12	43	49	-6	50		
2022	17	K4 League	4th	32	17	4	11	47	40	+7	55	Third round	
2023	17	K4 League	5th	30	14	8	8	61	54	+7	50	Second round	
2024	13	K4 League	9th	24	9	5	10	39	35	+4	32	First round	
