= Dangjin Citizen FC =

South Korean football club

Dangjin Citizen FC 당진 시민 축구단
- Full name: Dangjin Citizen Football Club 당진 시민 축구단
- Founded: 10 March 2021; 5 years ago
- Ground: Dangjin Sports Complex
- Capacity: 11,718
- Owner: Dangjin City
- Chairman: Oh Seong-hwan (Major of Dangjin)
- Coach: Han Sang-min
- League: K3 League
- 2026: 6th of 14
- Website: dangjincitizen.com/
Home colours	Away colours

Dangjin Citizen Football Club (Korean: 당진 시민 축구단) is a semi-professional South Korean football club based in Dangjin, South Chungcheong. The club was founded in 2020 and plays in the K3 League, the third tier of football in South Korea.

== History ==
The first plan to establish a football club in the city emerged in December 2019, when the city of Dangjin announced that it wanted to set up its own franchise. With Dangjin City administration approval, the club was founded and held their founding ceremony on 10 March 2021 to enter the 2021 K4 League season.

In their inaugural season, Dangjin Citizens finished 3rd and gained promotion to via the playoffs to the 2022 K3 League season. The following year they finished last and were subsequently relegated back for the 2023 K4 League season.

Dangjin started the 2023 season strong with 6 win from 7 matches. This included two Korean FA Cup wins. They weren't able to keep up the momentum, but still finished close to the promotion playoff zone. In the Korean FA Cup, Dangjing dispatched K5 League's Gwangju Hwajeong and K3 League's Busan Transportation Corporation FC, but exited in the third round with a 2-1 loss away against Paju Citizen FC.

During the 2024 season, Dangjing was inconsistent, but despite three losses in their previous three matched, they went into the last match of the season with a change to finish in the promotion playoff position. The results was a 6-0 away loss against a surging Seoul Nowon United FC. In a notably congested table, Dangjin finished 8th, equal on points with Seoul Nowon United in the 3rd. In the Korean FA Cup, the team exited in the first round with a 3-1 loss away to Daejeon Korail FC.

The 2025 season started with 2 league wins, a first round Korea Cup exit against K3 League's Gangneung Citizen FC, followed by 2 league losses. The club's first coach, Han Sang-min is still in charge of the team. On 15 November 2025, Dangjin Citizen secure promotion to K3 League from next season due to despite lose in Final matchday and return to their tier after three years absence.

On 19 August 2026, Dangjin Citizen reach to Korea Cup quarter final for the first time after defeat Jeonbuk Hyundai Motors on penalties 3–5 after draw 2–2. Dangjin was first team from third tier to reach quarter final for cup upset.

== Current squad ==
As of 11 February 2025

Note: Flags indicate national team as defined under FIFA eligibility rules; some limited exceptions apply. Players may hold more than one non-FIFA nationality.

No.	Pos.	Nation	Player
1	GK	KOR	Han Seung-hyeop
3	DF	KOR	Lee Seong-jin
4	DF	KOR	Shin Jae-wook
5	DF	KOR	Jeong Han-cheol
6	MF	KOR	Song Hong-min
7	FW	KOR	Choi Se-yoon
8	DF	KOR	Kim Woo-seok
9	FW	KOR	Lee Ho-jong
10	MF	KOR	Jeong Yeong-ung
11	FW	KOR	Han Chang-goo
13	DF	KOR	Park Sung-woo
14	MF	KOR	Moon Ki-han
15	MF	KOR	Kim Tae-min
16	MF	KOR	Kim Hyun-joong
17	DF	KOR	Lee Byung-chan
18	MF	KOR	Na Seung-hoon

No.	Pos.	Nation	Player
19	DF	KOR	Seo Kyung-joo
20	DF	KOR	Go Tae-gyu
21	GK	KOR	Lim Jun-seok
22	FW	KOR	Moon Seul-beom
23	DF	KOR	Kim Jin-ha
25	DF	KOR	Lee Sun-ho
26	DF	KOR	Lee Min-ho
27	MF	KOR	Park Sung-geon
28	MF	KOR	Lee Seung-gyu
30	DF	KOR	Yoo Hyun-woo
31	GK	KOR	Baek Kyung-in
33	MF	KOR	Kim Hye-seong
37	MF	KOR	Seok Ji-hoon
38	DF	KOR	Kim Tae-hyun (captain)
66	MF	KOR	Baek Sang-hoon
77	MF	KOR	Kim Hong

== Honours ==
=== Domestic competitions ===
==== League ====
- K4 League

Champions : 2025
Play-off Promotion : 2021 Winner

== Season by season ==
Season	Teams	Tier	Placement	Pld	W	D	L	GF	GA	GD	Pts	Korea Cup	Notes
2021	16	K4 League	3rd	30	19	5	6	60	40	+20	62		Gained promotion to K3 League via playoffs
2022	16	K3 League	16th	30	3	8	19	26	51	-25	17	Second round	Relegation to K4 League
2023	17	K4 League	7th	30	15	4	11	52	43	+9	49	Third round	
2024	13	K4 League	7th	24	11	1	12	46	47	-1	34	First round	
2025	11	K4 League	1st	30	16	3	11	72	54	+18	51	First round	Promotion to K3 League
2026	14	K3 League	6th	26	11	5	10	51	41	+10	38	TBD round	
2027		K3 League										TBD round	
