= Jinju Citizen FC =

South Korean football club

Jinju Citizen 진주 시민
- Full name: Jinju Citizen Football Club 진주 시민축구단
- Short name: Jinju Citizen
- Founded: 2019; 7 years ago
- Ground: Jinju Stadium
- Capacity: 20,116
- Owner: Jinju City Council
- Chairman: Jo Kyu-il (Mayor of Jinju City)
- Manager: Lee Chang-yeop
- League: K3 League
- 2026: K4 League, 1st of 13 (promoted)
- Website: jinjufc.co.kr
Home colours	Away colours

Jinju Citizen Football Club (Korean: 진주 시민 축구단) is a South Korean football club based in the district of Jinju. The team was founded the 23rd of December 2019 and play in the K3 League from 2027, a professional league and the third tier of football in South Korea after promotion from K4 League in 2026.

== History ==
Jinju Citizen was founded in 23 December 2019.

Jinju began in K4 League inaugural season for 2020.

In 2026, Jinju Citizen was participate in Korea Cup until they reach round of 16 for the first time in their history after impresive perform. The club was brought Champion of K4 League and promotion to K3 League for the first time in their history from next season.

== Players ==
=== Current squad ===
As of 22 January 2025

Note: Flags indicate national team as defined under FIFA eligibility rules; some limited exceptions apply. Players may hold more than one non-FIFA nationality.

No.	Pos.	Nation	Player
1	GK	KOR	Kim Weonjung
2	DF	KOR	Bak Jaewoo
3	DF	KOR	Lee Gwangjun
4	DF	KOR	Kim Jinsan
5	DF	KOR	Seo Taegyeong
6	DF	KOR	Lee Hoyeong
7	MF	KOR	Bak Gyeongmin
8	MF	KOR	Gweon Gipyo
9	FW	KOR	Kim Minsu
10	FW	KOR	Kim Minu
11	FW	KOR	Lee Seonyu
13	MF	KOR	Kim Hanbyeol
14	MF	KOR	Yu Changhun
15	DF	KOR	Yang Jungyeok
16	FW	KOR	Kim Taeu
17	MF	KOR	Song Heechang

No.	Pos.	Nation	Player
18	MF	KOR	Lee Donghyeong
19	FW	KOR	Kim Boyong
20	DF	KOR	Lee Juyeong
21	FW	KOR	Hwang Jaejeong
22	MF	KOR	Jeong Hyeok
23	MF	KOR	Gong Yonghun
24	FW	KOR	Choi Yeongchan
25	MF	KOR	Lee Junyeong
26	MF	KOR	Kim Seoung
29	GK	KOR	Hwang Jeonghyeon
33	DF	KOR	Lee Jaeyong
66	DF	KOR	Han Donghun
77	FW	KOR	Lee Eunpyo
90	FW	KOR	Yun Seungbin
99	FW	KOR	Lee Raejun

== Season-by-season records ==
Season	Teams	Tier	Placement	Pld	W	D	L	GF	GA	GD	Pts	FA Cup
2020	13	K4 League	3rd	24	15	5	4	46	25	+21	50	DNQ
2021	16	K4 League	5th	30	16	8	6	57	28	+29	56	First round
2022	17	K4 League	11th	32	12	7	13	42	47	-5	43	First Round
2023	16	K4 League	4th	30	16	4	10	45	37	+8	52	First Round
2024	13	K4 League	5th	24	10	4	10	36	36	0	34	3rd Round
2025	11	K4 League	4th	30	14	7	9	55	48	+7	49	2nd Round
2026	13	K4 League	1st	24	17	3	4	53	20	+33	54	Round of 16
2027		K3 League								0		TBD

== Honours ==
=== Domestic competitions ===
==== League ====
- K4 League

Champions : 2026

== See also ==
- List of football clubs in South Korea
