= Yangpyeong FC =

- Full name: Yangpyeong Football Club 양평 축구단
- Founded: 2016; 10 years ago
- Ground: Yangpyeong Stadium
- Capacity: 6,300
- Owner: Jun Jin-sun
- Manager: Yang Hyun-jung
- League: K3 League
- 2025: K3 League, 8th of 15
- Website: fcyangpyeong.modoo.at
Home colours	Away colours

Yangpyeong Football Club (Korean: 양평 FC) is a South Korean football club based in the county of Yangpyeong in Gyeonggi Province. The club plays in the K3 League, a semi-professional league and the third tier of league football in South Korea.

== History ==
Yangpyeong FC was founded in 2016 and played in the amateur K3 League in the 2016 season. Following the division of the K3 into K3 League Advanced and K3 League Basic, Yangpyeong played in the K3 League Advanced from 2017 to 2019.

In 2020, the club joined the newly established K4 League. In 2022, Yangpyeong were the runners-up of the K4 League and were promoted to the semi-professional K3 League.

== See also ==
- List of football clubs in South Korea
