= 2023 Korean FA Cup =

2023 Hana 1Q FA Cup

Tournament details
- Country: South Korea
- Dates: 4 March – 4 November 2023
- Teams: 58

Final positions
- Champions: Pohang Steelers (5th title)
- Runners-up: Jeonbuk Hyundai Motors
- Champions League Elite: Pohang Steelers

Tournament statistics
- Matches played: 57
- Goals scored: 197 (3.46 per match)
- Top goal scorer: Gustavo (5 goals)

Awards
- Best player: Kim Jong-woo

The 2023 Korean FA Cup, known as the 2023 Hana 1Q FA Cup (Korean: 2023 하나원큐 FA컵) due to sponsorship agreement with Hana Bank, was the 28th edition of the Korean FA Cup. The winners qualified for the 2024–25 AFC Champions League Elite.

Jeonbuk Hyundai Motors were the defending champions, having won their fifth cup title the previous season. They failed to defend the trophy after losing to Pohang Steelers in the final.

== Schedule ==
The draw was held on 20 February 2023 at the Soccer Hall in Seoul. It decided all the match-ups from the first round to the fourth round (round of 16) along with the playing dates.

Round	Date	Matches	Clubs remaining	Clubs involved	New entries this round
First round	4–5 March	14	58	28	10 K3 League teams 10 K4 League teams 8 K5 League teams
Second round	29–30 March	16	44	14+18	13 K League 2 teams 5 K3 League teams
Third round	12 April	12	28	16+8	8 K League 1 teams
Round of 16	24 May	8	16	12+4	4 Champions League teams
Quarter-finals	28 June	4	8	8	None
Semi-finals	1 November	2	4	4	None
Final	4 November	1	2	2	None

== Bracket ==
Round of 16 (Fourth round)
Pohang Steelers	3
Seongnam FC	0
Gangwon FC	3
Gimpo FC	2
Jeju United	4
Daejeon Hana Citizen	3
Ulsan Hyundai (a.e.t.)	2
Jeonnam Dragons	1
Jeonbuk Hyundai Motors (a.e.t.)	5
Paju Citizen	2
Gwangju FC	1
Seoul E-Land	0
Incheon United	3
Gyeongnam FC	0
Suwon Samsung Bluewings	1
Daegu FC	0

Quarter-finals (Fifth round)
Pohang Steelers	2
Gangwon FC	1
Jeju United (p)	1 (6)
Ulsan Hyundai	1 (5)
Jeonbuk Hyundai Motors	4
Gwangju FC	0
Incheon United	3
Suwon Samsung Bluewings	2

Semi-finals (Sixth round)
Pohang Steelers (p)	1 (4)
Jeju United	1 (3)
Jeonbuk Hyundai Motors	3
Incheon United	1

Final (Seventh round)
Pohang Steelers	4
Jeonbuk Hyundai Motors	2

== First round ==
4 March 2023 1	Gangneung Citizen (3)	6–0	Mokpo Gatdangdae (5)	Gangneung
14:00 (UTC+9)	Jeong Jae-yeong 8' (o.g.); Park Gyeong-bae 32', 50', 90'; Kim Ji-han 80', 85'			Stadium: Gangneung World Football Field; Attendance: 73; Referee: Yu Chae-hong

5 March 2023 2	Sejong Ugil (5)	1–5	Jinju Citizen (4)	Sejong City
14:00 (UTC+9)	Lee Min-hee 79'		Kim Min-u 19'; Lee Hyeon-seong 29'; Lee Hyeon-il 38', 58'; Lee Sang-jun 85'	Stadium: Sejong Central Park Football Field; Attendance: 220; Referee: Yeom Dae-jun

4 March 2023 3	Ulsan Citizen (3)	1–1 (a.e.t.) (4–5 p)	Hwaseong FC (3)	Ulsan
14:00 (UTC+9)	Lee Hyeong-gyeong 85'		Luan 77'	Stadium: Ulsan Stadium; Attendance: 487; Referee: Lee Dong-jin
	Penalties
	Park Dong-hyeok (penalty scored); Kim Jin-seong (penalty scored); Bu Seong-hyeok (penalty scored); Gu Jong-uk (penalty missed); Lee Hyeong-gyeong (penalty scored); Kim Dong-yun (penalty missed)		(penalty scored) Luan; (penalty scored) Jeong Hyeon-shik; (penalty scored) Kim Min-shik; (penalty scored) Ryu Yeon-seung; (penalty missed) Kim Gyeong-min; (penalty scored) Gu Dae-yeop

5 March 2023 4	TNT FC (5)	1–2	Yangju Citizen (3)	Seoul
14:00 (UTC+9)	Kim Yo-han 61'		Kim Da-won 12', 85'	Stadium: Seongnae 2nd Football Field; Attendance: 79; Referee: Kim Jae-hyeon

4 March 2023 5	Daejeon Seobu (5)	0–6	Jeonju Citizen (4)	Gyeryong
14:00 (UTC+9)			Kim Do-hyeong 22', 63'; Jeon San-hae 44'; Myeong Geon-uk 62', 74', 90+1'	Stadium: Gyeryong Stadium; Attendance: 132; Referee: Geum Ho-seop

5 March 2023 6	FC Chungju (4)	1–2	FC Mokpo (3)	Chungju
14:00 (UTC+9)	Kwon Yeong-ho 47'		Cho Geon-gyu 43'; Choi Oh-baek 45+2'	Stadium: Chungju Tan-geum Stadium; Attendance: 234; Referee: Yu Chae-hong

5 March 2023 7	Incheon Ganseok (5)	0–7	Pyeongtaek Citizen (4)	Incheon
14:00 (UTC+9)			Lee Yeon-u 29'; Jeon Hae-min 38', 52'; Lee Han-bin 56'; Go Byeong-beom 58'; Jang Ju-seung 63'; Jeong Eun-chan 71'	Stadium: Namdong Industrial Park Stadium; Attendance: 155; Referee: Kim Jae-hyeon

5 March 2023 8	Geoje Citizen (4)	2–0	Yangpyeong FC (3)	Geoje
14:00 (UTC+9)	Lee Kang-uk 45+1'; Jeong Seo-un 86'			Stadium: Geoje Stadium; Attendance: 289; Referee: Choi Pureun-haneul

4 March 2023 9	Daejeon Korail (3)	1–0	Seoul Nowon United (4)	Daejeon
14:00 (UTC+9)	Park Ye-chan 70'			Stadium: Daejeon World Cup Stadium Auxiliary Stadium; Attendance: 153; Referee: Cha Jin-hwan

4 March 2023 10	Gimhae FC (3)	1–2 (a.e.t.)	Pyeongchang United (4)	Gimhae
14:00 (UTC+9)	Yoon Byeong-u 45+2'		Oh Hyeong-taek 22'; Jeong Jin-yeop 118'	Stadium: Gimhae Stadium; Attendance: 228; Referee: Cho Won-seok

4 March 2023 11	Yeoju FC (4)	4–3	Pocheon Citizen (3)	Yeoju
14:00 (UTC+9)	Cho Woo-ri 54'; Lee Sang-jin 58'; Lee Dong-hee 77'; Yoo Cheong-in 90+5'		Cho Wan 18'; Kang Hyeong-min 45'; Kim Yeong-uk 82'	Stadium: Yeoju Stadium; Attendance: 325; Referee: Choi Pureun-haneul

4 March 2023 12	Seoul Jungnang (4)	9–0	Cheongju Showking (5)	Seoul
13:00 (UTC+9)	Choi Seung-hyeon 25', 45', 70'; Ka Gngyeong-hun 54'; Song Tae-seong 58'; Lee Ji-hun 78'; Jeon Sang-cheon 84', 89'; Jeong Hee-ung 87'			Stadium: Jungrang Municipal Ground; Attendance: 198; Referee: Yeom Dae-jun

4 March 2023 13	Gimhae Jaemics (5)	0–6	Chuncheon Citizen (3)	Gimhae
14:00 (UTC+9)			Kim Gyeong-gu 15'; Lee Jae-hyeon 33'; Ha Jae-hyeon 35'; Lee Jung-ho 44'; Shin Sang-hwi 58'; Ro Yeong-hun 70'	Stadium: Gimhae Municipal Sports Park Football Field; Attendance: 47; Referee: Choi Won-jun

4 March 2023 14	Gwangju Hwajeong (5)	0–2	Dangjin Citizen (4)	Gwangju
14:00 (UTC+9)			Park Chang-jun 45'; Kim Un 51'	Stadium: Boramae Football Ground; Attendance: 33; Referee: Geum Ho-seop

== Second round ==
30 March 2023 15	Gangneung Citizen (3)	1–2	Gyeongnam FC (2)	Gangneung
19:00 (UTC+9)	Kim Joon-seon 40'		Kwon Gi-pyo 75'; Seol Yeon-jin 83'	Stadium: Gangneung Stadium; Attendance: 505; Referee: Won Jong-hoon

30 March 2023 16	Jinju Citizen (4)	1–2	Siheung Citizen (3)	Jinju
19:00 (UTC+9)	Jo Kwang-hyun 73'		Lee Yeon-gyu 51' (o.g.); Kim Min-seok 77'	Stadium: Jinju Stadium; Attendance: 76; Referee: Ryu Hyeon-seong

29 March 2023 17	Hwaseong FC (3)	2–3	Ansan Greeners (2)	Hwaseong
19:00 (UTC+9)	Baek Seung-woo 64', 90+4'		Kim Yeong-nam 17'; Jeong Jae-min 54'; Jeong Ji-wong 56'	Stadium: Hwaseong Sports Town; Attendance: 248; Referee: Choi Seung-hwan

30 March 2023 18	Cheonan City (2)	3–2	Yangju Citizen (3)	Cheonan
19:00 (UTC+9)	Kim Jong-min 50', 83'; Jang Baek-kyu 73'		Kim Min-seo 76'; Yang Chang-hoon 89'	Stadium: Cheonan Stadium; Attendance: 619; Referee: Park Yeong-rok

29 March 2023 19	Chungnam Asan (2)	2–0	Jeonju Citizen (4)	Asan
19:00 (UTC+9)	Kim Hye-seong 24'; Kim Min-seok 49'			Stadium: Yi Sun-sin Stadium; Attendance: 142; Referee: Go Min-kook

29 March 2023 20	Jeonnam Dragons (2)	1–0	FC Mokpo (3)	Gwangyang
19:00 (UTC+9)	No Geon-woo 38'			Stadium: Gwangyang Football Stadium; Attendance: 492; Referee: Kim Jeong-ho

30 March 2023 21	Changwon City (3)	2–1	Pyeongtaek Citizen (4)	Changwon
18:00 (UTC+9)	Byeon Gyeon-min 40', 78'		Lee Han-bin 60'	Stadium: Changwon Football Center Main Stadium; Attendance: 164; Referee: Lee Ji-hyeong

30 March 2023 22	Gyeongju KHNP (3)	1–1 (4–5 p)	Geoje Citizen (4)	Gyeongju
19:00 (UTC+9)	Léo 70'		Choi Jin-hyeok 87'	Stadium: Gyeongju Football Park 3rd Attendance: 155; Referee: Jang Soon-taek

30 March 2023 23	Daejeon Korail (3)	1–2	Gimcheon Sangmu (2)	Daejeon
19:00 (UTC+9)	Kim Min-hyeok 66'		Lee Yeong-jun 59'; Kang Hyeon-mook 90+4'	Stadium: Daejeon World Cup Auxiliary Stadium; Attendance: 380; Referee: Choi Cheol-jun

29 March 2023 24	Seongnam FC (2)	1–0	Pyeongchang United (4)	Seongnam
19:00 (UTC+9)	Shim Dong-woon 23'			Stadium: Tancheon Stadium; Attendance: 292; Referee: Won Myeong-hee

29 March 2023 25	Yeoju Citizen (4)	2–4	Gimpo FC (2)	Yeoju
16:00 (UTC+9)	Seo Jung-won 59'; Lee Hyeon-wang 69'		Pablo 32' (pen.); Min Seong-yeon 82', 105'; Song Joon-seok 120+3'	Stadium: Yeoju Stadium; Attendance: 279; Referee: Kim Gi-hyeon

29 March 2023 26	Chungbuk Cheongju (2)	3–0	Seoul Jungnang (4)	Cheongju
19:00 (UTC+9)	Lee Jeong-taek 43'; Lee Seung-jae 55'; Kang Min-seong 79'			Stadium: Cheongju Stadium; Attendance: 606; Referee: Lee Ju-ho

30 March 2023 27	Chuncheon Citizen (3)	1–2	Paju Citizen (3)	Chuncheon
19:00 (UTC+9)	Pyo Geon-hee 43'		Seong Jeong-yoon 45'; Kim Do-yun 51'	Stadium: Chuncheon Songam Sports Town; Attendance: 132; Referee: Park Jeong-bok

30 March 2023 28	Busan Transportation Corporation (3)	0–2	Dangjin Citizen (4)	Busan
19:00 (UTC+9)			Lee Yoon-kwon 37'; Yoon Chan-wool 43'	Stadium: Busan Asiad Auxiliary Stadium; Attendance: 184; Referee: Hyeon Tae-yang

29 March 2023 29	Seoul E-Land (2)	6–0	Bucheon FC 1995 (2)	Seoul
19:00 (UTC+9)	Lee Si-hyeon 24', 30', 34'; Bruno 28', 68'; Yoon Jeong-wan 56'			Stadium: Mokdong Stadium; Attendance: 356; Referee: Park Jong-myeong

29 March 2023 30	FC Anyang (2)	1–4	Busan IPark (2)	Anyang
19:00 (UTC+9)	Choi Seong-beom 40'		Choi Geon-joo 3'; Choi Ji-mook 10'; Park Jeong-in 33'; Franklin 89'	Stadium: Anyang Stadium; Attendance: 782; Referee: Kim Woo-seong

== Third round ==
12 April 2023 31	Gyeongnam FC (2)	2–0	Siheung Citizen (3)	Changwon
15:00 (UTC+9)	Seol Hyeon-jin 16'; Kwon Gi-pyo 65'			Stadium: Changwon Stadium; Attendance: 126; Referee: Choi Il-woo

12 April 2023 32	Ansan Greeners (2)	1–3	Suwon Samsung Bluewings (1)	Ansan
19:00 (UTC+9)	Kang Jun-mo 88'		Ryu Seung-woo 49'; An Byong-jun 55'; Jeon Jin-woo 59'	Stadium: Ansan Wa~ Stadium; Attendance: 1,848; Referee: Shin Yong-jun

12 April 2023 33	Daegu FC (1)	2–1 (a.e.t.)	Cheonan City (2)	Daegu
19:00 (UTC+9)	Lee Keun-ho 38'; Barcellos 112' (pen.)		Bruno Mota 84' (pen.)	Stadium: DGB Daegu Bank Park; Attendance: 2,257; Referee: Oh Hyeon-jin

12 April 2023 34	Chungnam Asan (2)	2–3	Jeonnam Dragons (2)	Asan
19:00 (UTC+9)	Song Seung-min 79'; Lee Hak-min 86'		Chu Sang-hoon 19'; Ha Nam 81'; Park Tae-yong 90+3'	Stadium: Yi Sun-sin Stadium; Attendance: 337; Referee: Jeong Hwi-soo

12 April 2023 35	Changwon City (3)	1–2	Jeju United (1)	Changwon
19:00 (UTC+9)	Lee Jae-gwon 60'		Kim Ju-gong 39'; Koo Ja-cheol 90+2'	Stadium: Changwon Football Center Main Stadium; Attendance: 274; Referee: Park Jin-ho

12 April 2023 36	Daejeon Hana Citizen (1)	4–1	Geoje Citizen (4)	Daejeon
19:00 (UTC+9)	Lee Dong-won 7'; Lee Seon-yu 61'; Byeon Jun-su 66'; Yoo Kang-hyeon 90+4'		Kim Gyeong-hwan 29'	Stadium: Daejeon World Cup Stadium; Attendance: 543; Referee: Kim Yoo-jeong

12 April 2023 37	Gimcheon Sangmu (2)	1–1 (a.e.t.) (3–4 p)	Seongnam FC (2)	Gimcheon
19:00 (UTC+9)	Kim Jun-beom 90'		Jeong Han-min 64'	Stadium: Gimcheon Stadium; Attendance: 354; Referee: Lee Ji-hyeong
	Penalties
	Kim Jun-beom (penalty scored); Yoon Seok-ju (penalty scored); Lee Jung-min (penalty missed); Won Du-jae (penalty scored); Lim Seung-gyeom (penalty missed)		(penalty scored) Lee Sang-min; (penalty scored) Kim Hyeon-tae; (penalty scored) Yang Tae-yang; (penalty missed) Yoo Ju-an; (penalty scored) Kim Won-jun

12 April 2023 38	Gimpo FC (2)	1–1 (a.e.t.) (4–2 p)	FC Seoul (1)	Gimpo
19:00 (UTC+9)	Jang Yoon-ho 69'		Kang Seong-jin 56'	Stadium: Gimpo Solteo Football Field; Attendance: 3,345; Referee: Kim Do-yeon
	Penalties
	Pablo González (penalty scored); Lee Seong-jae (penalty scored); Son Seok-young (penalty scored); Yoon Min-ho (penalty scored)		(penalty scored) Iljutcenko; (penalty missed) Hwang Hyeon-su; (penalty scored) Park Soo-il; (penalty missed) Lee Seung-jun

2 May 2023 (Note: Postponed due to wildfire in Gangneung on 10–11 April 2023.) 39	Gangwon FC (1)	1–1 (7–6 p)	Chungbuk Cheongju (2)	Gangneung
19:00 (UTC+9)	Kim Dae-won 44'		Kim Myung-sun 25'	Stadium: Gangneung Stadium; Attendance: 3,437; Referee: Kim Yeong-su
	Penalties
	KIM Dae-won (penalty scored); RIM Chang-woo (penalty scored); YANG Hyun-jun (penalty missed); PARK Sang-hyeok (penalty scored); YOON Seok-young (penalty scored); KIM Young-bin (penalty scored); SEO Min-woo (penalty scored); KIM Woo-seok (penalty scored)		(penalty scored) Jorge Luiz; (penalty scored) JANG Hyeok-jin; (penalty scored) GU Hyeon-jun; (penalty scored) Makrillos; (penalty missed) YANG Ji-hun; (penalty scored) HONG Won-jin; (penalty scored) PARK Jin-seong; (penalty missed) JEONG Min-woo

12 April 2023 40	Paju Citizen (3)	2–1	Dangjin Citizen (4)	Paju
19:00 (UTC+9)	Ahn Eun-san 6'; Kim Seung-chan 37'		Shim Ji-hoon 26'	Stadium: Paju Stadium; Attendance: 255; Referee: Yoo Hyo-yeong

12 April 2023 41	Seoul E-Land (2)	2–1	Suwon FC (1)	Seoul
19:30 (UTC+9)	Kwak Seong-uk 50'; Bruno 85'		Jang Jae-woong 21'	Stadium: Mokdong Stadium; Attendance: 425; Referee: Jo Ji-eum

12 April 2023 42	Gwangju FC (1)	2–1	Busan IPark (2)	Gwangju
19:00 (UTC+9)	Park Han-bin 14'; Lee Geon-hee 89'		Franklin 87'	Stadium: Gwangju Football Stadium; Attendance: 610; Referee: Choi Gyu-hyeon

== Round of 16 ==
24 May 2023 43	Incheon United (1)	3–0	Gyeongnam FC (2)	Incheon
19:00 (UTC+9)	M'Poku 25'; Hong Si-hoo 37'; Jeong Dong-yun 41'			Stadium: Incheon Football Stadium; Attendance: 2,460; Referee: Song Min-seok

24 May 2023 44	Suwon Samsung Bluewings (1)	1–0	Daegu FC (1)	Suwon
19:00 (UTC+9)	Kim Ju-chan 27'			Stadium: Suwon World Cup Stadium; Attendance: 3,254; Referee: Kim Dae-yong

24 May 2023 45	Jeonnam Dragons (2)	1–2 (a.e.t.)	Ulsan Hyundai (1)	Gwangyang
19:00 (UTC+9)	Ha Nam 64'		Lim Jong-eun 90+2'; Ádám 92'	Stadium: Gwangyang Football Stadium; Attendance: 7,330; Referee: Choi Kwang-ho

24 May 2023 46	Jeju United (1)	4–3	Daejeon Hana Citizen (1)	Seogwipo
19:00 (UTC+9)	Lee Ki-hyuk 15'; Kim Seung-sub 28'; Yuri 61'; Jeong San 73' (o.g.)		Ishida 53'; Leandro 56'; Byeon Jun-soo 65'	Stadium: Jeju World Cup Stadium; Attendance: 1,333; Referee: Park Byeong-jin

24 May 2023 47	Seongnam FC (2)	0–3	Pohang Steelers (1)	Seongnam
19:00 (UTC+9)			Ha Chang-rae 10'; Lee Ho-jae 28', 59'	Stadium: Tancheon Stadium; Attendance: 885; Referee: An Jae-hoon

24 May 2023 48	Gimpo FC (2)	2–3	Gangwon FC (1)	Gimpo
19:00 (UTC+9)	Luis Mina 18', 68'		Jefferson Galego 52', 90+3'; Han Kook-young 59'	Stadium: Gimpo Solteo Football Field; Attendance: 2,146; Referee: Jeong Hwi-soo

24 May 2023 49	Jeonbuk Hyundai Motors (1)	5–2 (a.e.t.)	Paju Citizen (3)	Jeonju
19:00 (UTC+9)	Gustavo 29', 38', 103', 115'; Park Jin-seop 111'		Kwak Rae-seung 33'; Seong Jeong-yoon 59'	Stadium: Jeonju World Cup Stadium; Attendance: 2,168; Referee: Jo Ji-eum

24 May 2023 50	Seoul E-Land (2)	0–1	Gwangju FC (1)	Seoul
19:00 (UTC+9)			Heo Yool 90+2'	Stadium: Mokdong Sports Complex; Attendance: 788; Referee: Chae Sang-hyeob

== Quarter-finals ==
28 June 2023 51	Incheon United (1)	3–2	Suwon Samsung Bluewings (1)	Incheon
19:00 (UTC+9)	Hernandes Rodrigues 32'; Cheon Seong-hoon 45+3', 54'		Myung Jun-jae 23', 43'	Stadium: Incheon Football Stadium; Attendance: 3,597; Referee: Kim Yong-woo

28 June 2023 52	Ulsan Hyundai (1)	1–1 (a.e.t.) (5–6 p)	Jeju United (1)	Ulsan
19:00 (UTC+9)	Ádám 27'		Kim Seung-sub 42'	Stadium: Ulsan Munsu Football Stadium; Attendance: 5,891; Referee: Kim Hee-gon
	Penalties
	Ádám (penalty scored); Jung Seung-hyun (penalty scored); Lee Chung-yong (penalty scored); Kim Young-gwon (penalty scored); Joo Min-kyu (penalty scored); Qazaishvili (penalty missed); Park Yong-woo (penalty missed)		(penalty scored) Chung Woon; (penalty scored) Reis; (penalty scored) Seo Jin-su; (penalty scored) Yuri Jonathan; (penalty scored) Lim Chai-min; (penalty missed) Lee Ju-yong; (penalty scored) Yeon Je-woon

28 June 2023 53	Pohang Steelers (1)	2–1	Gangwon FC (1)	Pohang
19:00 (UTC+9)	Zeca 82'; Park Chan-yong 88'		Yu In-soo 38'	Stadium: Pohang Steel Yard; Attendance: 2,526; Referee: Kim Woo-seong

28 June 2023 54	Jeonbuk Hyundai Motors (1)	4–0	Gwangju FC (1)	Jeonju
19:00 (UTC+9)	Song Min-kyu 57'; Cho Gue-sung 62' (pen.), 88'; Jun Amano 68'			Stadium: Jeonju World Cup Stadium; Attendance: 4,732; Referee: Jeong Dong-sik

== Semi-finals ==
The draw was held on 18 July 2023.

1 November 2023 55	Jeonbuk Hyundai Motors (1)	3–1	Incheon United (1)	Jeonju
19:00 (UTC+9)	Moon Seon-min 23'; Paik Seung-ho 62'; Park Jae-yong 90+7' (pen.)		Gerso Fernandes 39'	Stadium: Jeonju World Cup Stadium; Referee: Kim Jong-hyeok

1 November 2023 56	Jeju United (1)	1–1 (a.e.t.) (3–4 p)	Pohang Steelers (1)	Seogwipo
19:30 (UTC+9)	Seo Jin-su 43'		Kim In-sung 59'	Stadium: Jeju World Cup Stadium; Referee: Ko Hyung-jin
	Penalties
	Chung Woon (penalty scored); Lim Chai-min (penalty missed); Yuri (penalty scored); Kim Oh-gyu (penalty missed); Yeon Je-woon (penalty scored)		(penalty missed) Zeca; (penalty scored) Park Chan-yong; (penalty scored) Sim Sang-min; (penalty scored) Han Chan-hee; (penalty scored) Lee Ho-jae

== Final ==
4 November 2023
14:15 (UTC+9)

Pohang Steelers	4–2	Jeonbuk Hyundai Motors
Han Chan-hee 44'; Zeca 74'; Kim Jong-woo 78'; Hong Yun-sang 90+2'		Song Min-kyu 17'; Gustavo 51' (pen.)

Pohang Steel Yard, Pohang
Attendance: 12,759
Referee: Lee Dong-jun

GK	21	(South Korea) Hwang In-jae
RB	17	(South Korea) Shin Kwang-hoon	(substituted off) 56'
CB	45	(South Korea) Ha Chang-rae
CB	5	(Australia) Alex Grant	(yellow card) 61'
LB	14	(South Korea) Park Seung-wook
CM	6	(South Korea) Kim Jong-woo
CM	16	(South Korea) Han Chan-hee
RM	7	(South Korea) Kim In-sung	(substituted off) 56'
AM	11	(South Korea) Goh Young-jun
LM	12	(South Korea) Kim Seung-dae (c)
CF	9	(Brazil) Zeca	(substituted off) 76'
Substitutes:
GK	1	(South Korea) Yoon Pyeong-gook
DF	2	(South Korea) Sim Sang-min	(substituted on) 56'
DF	20	(South Korea) Park Chan-yong
MF	37	(South Korea) Hong Yun-sang	(substituted on) 56'
MF	66	(South Korea) Kim Jun-ho
FW	30	(South Korea) Yoon Jae-woon
FW	33	(South Korea) Lee Ho-jae	(substituted on) 76'
Manager:
(South Korea) Kim Gi-dong

GK	1	(South Korea) Kim Jeong-hoon
RB	32	(South Korea) Jeong Woo-jae	(substituted off) 82'
CB	3	(South Korea) Jeong Tae-wook
CB	26	(South Korea) Hong Jeong-ho (c)
LB	23	(South Korea) Kim Jin-su
DM	4	(South Korea) Park Jin-seop
CM	28	(South Korea) Maeng Seong-ung	(substituted off) 63'
CM	8	(South Korea) Paik Seung-ho
RW	7	(South Korea) Han Kyo-won
CF	9	(Brazil) Gustavo	(substituted off) 69'
LW	17	(South Korea) Song Min-kyu
Substitutes:
GK	13	(South Korea) Jeong Min-ki
DF	15	(South Korea) Koo Ja-ryong
DF	25	(South Korea) Choi Chul-soon
MF	11	(South Korea) Lee Dong-jun
MF	27	(South Korea) Moon Seon-min	(substituted on) 82' (yellow card) 90+4'
MF	57	(Ghana) Nana Boateng	(substituted on) 63' (yellow card) 90+8'
FW	10	(South Korea) Park Jae-yong	(substituted on) 69'
Manager:
(Romania) Dan Petrescu

== See also ==
- 2023 in South Korean football
