= 2022 K League 2 =

Tenth season of the K League 2, the second tier South Korean professional league

Hana 1Q K League 2
- Season: 2022
- Dates: 19 February – 23 October 2022
- Champions: Gwangju FC (2nd title)
- Promoted: Gwangju FC; Daejeon Hana Citizen
- Matches: 220
- Goals: 556 (2.53 per match)
- Best player: Ahn Young-kyu
- Top goalscorer: Yu Kang-hyun; Tiago Orobó (19 goals each)
- Biggest home win: Gyeongnam 6–1 Gimpo (4 June 2022)
- Biggest away win: Ansan 1–7 Jeonnam (14 September 2022)
- Highest scoring: Ansan 1–7 Jeonnam (14 September 2022); Daejeon 4–4 Gimpo (9 May 2022)
- Longest winning run: 4 matches Gwangju FC; Daejeon Hana Citizen; Seoul E-Land
- Longest unbeaten run: 15 matches Gwangju FC
- Longest winless run: 20 matches Jeonnam Dragons
- Longest losing run: 4 matches Ansan Greeners; Gimpo FC; Chungnam Asan

The 2022 K League 2 was the tenth season of the K League 2, the second-tier South Korean professional football league. The champions and the winners of the promotion play-offs could be promoted to the K League 1.

== Teams ==
=== Team changes ===
Relegated from K League 1

- Gwangju FC

Promoted to K League 1

- Gimcheon Sangmu

Promoted from K3 League

- Gimpo FC

=== Locations ===
Locations of the 2022 K League 2 teams

Team	City/Province	Abbreviation
Ansan Greeners	Ansan	Ansan
FC Anyang	Anyang	Anyang
Bucheon FC 1995	Bucheon	Bucheon
Busan IPark	Busan	Busan
Chungnam Asan	Asan	Chungnam Asan
Daejeon Hana Citizen	Daejeon	Daejeon
Gimpo FC	Gimpo	Gimpo
Gwangju FC	Gwangju	Gwangju
Gyeongnam FC	Gyeongnam	Gyeongnam
Jeonnam Dragons	Jeonnam	Jeonnam
Seoul E-Land	Seoul	Seoul E

=== Stadiums ===
Ansan Greeners	FC Anyang	Bucheon FC 1995
Ansan Wa~ Stadium	Anyang Stadium	Bucheon Stadium
Capacity: **35,000**	Capacity: **17,143**	Capacity: **34,456**
Busan IPark	Chungnam Asan	Daejeon Hana Citizen
Busan Asiad Main Stadium	Yi Sun-sin Stadium	Daejeon World Cup Stadium
Capacity: **53,769**	Capacity: **17,376**	Capacity: **40,535**
Gimpo FC	Gwangju FC	
Gimpo Solteo Football Stadium	Gwangju Football Stadium	
Capacity: **5,000**	Capacity: **10,007**	
Gyeongnam FC
Changwon Football Center	Jinju Stadium	Miryang Stadium
Capacity: **15,074**	Capacity: **20,116**	Capacity: **8,440**
Jeonnam Dragons	Seoul E-Land	
Gwangyang Stadium	Mokdong Stadium	
Capacity: **13,496**	Capacity: **15,511**	

=== Personnel and sponsoring ===
Team	Manager (Note: Managers in the last matchday.)	Kit manufacturer	Main sponsor
Ansan Greeners	(South Korea) Lim Jong-heon (caretaker)	Applerind	Ansan Government
FC Anyang	(South Korea) Lee Woo-hyung	V-EXX	Anyang Government
Bucheon FC 1995	(South Korea) Lee Young-min	Kelme	Bucheon Government
Busan IPark	(South Korea) Park Jin-sub	Puma	HDC Group
Chungnam Asan	(South Korea) Park Dong-hyuk	Mizuno	Asan Government
Daejeon Hana Citizen	(South Korea) Lee Min-sung	Macron	Hana Financial Group
Gimpo FC	(South Korea) Ko Jeong-woon	Sunderland of Scotland	Gimpo Government
Gwangju FC	(South Korea) Lee Jung-hyo	Kelme	Gwangju Government
Gyeongnam FC	(South Korea) Seol Ki-hyeon	Hummel	Gyeongnam Provincial Government
Jeonnam Dragons	(South Korea) Lee Jang-kwan	Puma	POSCO
Seoul E-Land	(South Korea) Chung Jung-yong	New Balance	E-Land

Note: Flags indicate national team as has been defined under FIFA eligibility rules. Players may hold more than one non-FIFA nationality.

=== Foreign players ===
The maximum number of foreign players on the K League 2 is restricted to five players per team, including slots for a player from AFC and ASEAN countries status. A team could only use a maximum of four foreign players in each matchday.

Players in bold joined midway through the competition.

Team	Player 1	Player 2	Player 3	AFC player	ASEAN player	Former player(s)
Ansan Greeners	(Brazil) Anderson Canhoto	(Brazil) Róbson Duarte	(Brazil) Thiago Henrique	(Japan) Go Iwase	(Indonesia) Asnawi Mangkualam	
FC Anyang	(Ghana) Maxwell Acosty	(Costa Rica) Jonathan Moya	(Brazil) Andrigo			
Bucheon FC 1995	(Brazil) Nilson	(Nigeria) Samuel Nnamani	(Panama) Jorman Aguilar			
Busan IPark	(Cyprus) Valentinos Sielis	(Croatia) Domagoj Drožđek	(Brazil) **Bruno Lamas**	(Australia) Ryan Edwards		
Chungnam Asan						
Daejeon Hana Citizen	(Brazil) Leandro Ribeiro	(Brazil) **Willyan**	(Brazil) **Renato Kayzer**	(Japan) Masatoshi Ishida		(Romania) Daniel Popa
Gimpo FC						(Bosnia and Herzegovina) Luka Juričić (Japan) Mitsuru Maruoka
Gwangju FC	(Brazil) Reis	(Brazil) Mike	(Brazil) **Sandro Lima**	(Australia) Aaron Calver		
Gyeongnam FC	(Brazil) Tiago Orobó	(Brazil) **Heliardo**	(Brazil) **Guilherme Castro**	(Japan) Ryonosuke Ohori		(Brazil) Willyan (Brazil) Hernandes
Jeonnam Dragons	(Brazil) Jonathan Balotelli	(Kosovo) Leonard Pllana	(Georgia (country)) Nika Kacharava	(Japan) Yuhei Sato		
Seoul E-Land	(Argentina) Mauricio Asenjo	(Argentina) Felipe Cadenazzi		(Japan) Tsubasa Nishi		

== League table ==
Pos	Team	Pld	W	D	L	GF	GA	GD	Pts	Promotion or qualification
1	Gwangju FC (C, P)	40	25	11	4	68	32	+36	86	Promotion to K League 1
2	Daejeon Hana Citizen (O, P)	40	21	11	8	70	45	+25	74	Qualification for promotion play-offs final round
3	FC Anyang	40	19	12	9	52	41	+11	69	Qualification for promotion play-offs second round
4	Bucheon FC 1995	40	17	10	13	52	44	+8	61	Qualification for promotion play-offs first round
5	Gyeongnam FC	40	16	8	16	60	61	−1	56	Qualification for promotion play-offs first round
6	Chungnam Asan	40	13	13	14	39	44	−5	52	
7	Seoul E-Land	40	11	15	14	46	47	−1	48	
8	Gimpo FC	40	10	11	19	39	65	−26	41	
9	Ansan Greeners	40	8	13	19	49	67	−18	37	
10	Busan IPark	40	9	9	22	34	52	−18	36	
11	Jeonnam Dragons	40	6	17	17	47	58	−11	35	

Source: K League Soccerway
Rules for classification: 1) Points; 2) Goals scored; 3) Goal difference; 4) Wins; 5) Head-to-head points
(C) Champions; (O) Play-off winners; (P) Promoted

== Positions by matchday ==
Leaders, promotion to K League 1
Qualification for promotion play-offs final round
Qualification for promotion play-offs second round
Qualification for promotion play-offs first round

=== Round 1–22 ===
Team ╲ Round	1	2	3	4	5	6	7	8	9	10	11	12	13	14	15	16	17	18	19	20	21	22
Gwangju FC	8	4	6	6	3	4	2	2	1	1	2	1	1	1	1	1	1	1	1	1	1	1
Daejeon Hana Citizen	9	10	10	9	9	9	5	6	4	4	3	3	3	3	3	3	3	2	2	2	2	2
FC Anyang	2	2	3	2	1	2	4	3	2	3	4	4	4	4	4	4	4	4	4	5	4	4
Bucheon FC 1995	6	3	1	1	2	1	1	1	3	2	1	2	2	2	2	2	2	3	3	3	3	3
Gyeongnam FC	10	5	2	5	7	6	7	8	8	9	9	8	6	6	6	6	6	6	6	6	6	6
Chungnam Asan	6	9	8	10	8	8	9	7	7	6	8	5	5	5	5	5	5	5	5	4	5	5
Seoul E-Land	2	6	5	4	5	5	6	5	6	7	5	6	7 (Note: Jeonnam Dragons' 13th round (against Seoul E-Land on 3 or 4 May) was postponed to 8 June due to their participation in the Champions League.)	7	7	7	7	7	7	7	7	7
Gimpo FC	1	1	4	2	4	7	8	9	9	8	7	9	9	8	9	9	9	8	8	9	8	8
Ansan Greeners	4	8	9	11	11	10	11	11	11	11	10	10	10	11	11	11	11	10	11	11	11	10
Busan IPark	4	7	7	8	10	11	10	10	10	10	11	10	11	10	10	10	10	11	10	10	10	11
Jeonnam Dragons	10	11	11	7	6	3	3	4	5	5	6	7	8	9	8	8	8	9	9	8	9	9

Source: K League

=== Round 23–44 ===
Team ╲ Round	23	24	25	26	27	28	29	30	31	32	33	34	35	36	37	38	39	40	41	42	43	44
Gwangju FC	1	1	1	1	1	1	1	1	1	1	1	1	1	1	1	1	1	1	1	1	1	1
Daejeon Hana Citizen	2	2	2	2	2	3 (Note: Daejeon Hana Citizen's 28th round (against FC Anyang on 24 July) and 29th round (against Jeonnam Dragons on 27 July) were postponed to 21 September and 5 October, respectively, due to the national team player's participation in the EAFF Championship.)	2	4	4	2	3	3	3	3	4	4	3	4	2	3	2	2
FC Anyang	4	3	3	3	3	2	4	3	3	4	2	2	2	2	2	2	2	2	3	2	3	3
Bucheon FC 1995	3	4	4	4	4	3	3	2	2	3	4	4	4	4	3	3	4	3	4	4	4	4
Gyeongnam FC	6	6	6	6	6	5 (Note: Seoul E-Land's 28th round (against Gyeongnam FC on 23 July) and 29th round (against Chungnam Asan on 26 July) were postponed to 21 September and 5 October, respectively, due to the national team player's participation in the EAFF Championship.)	6	6	6	6	5	5	5	6	6	6	5	5	5	5	5	5
Chungnam Asan	5	5	5	5	5	5	6	5	5	5	6	6	6	5	5	5	6	6	6	7	6	6
Seoul E-Land	7	7	8	8	8	7	7	8	8	8	8	9	9	9	8	7	7	7	7	6	7	7
Gimpo FC	8	8	7	7	7	7	7	7	7	7	7	7	7	7	9	9	9	9	8	8	8	8
Ansan Greeners	10	11	11	11	10	9	9	9	9	9	9	8	8	8	7	8	8	8	9	9	9	9
Busan IPark	11	10	10	10	11	11	11	11	11	11	11	11	11	11	11	11	11	11	11	11	11	10
Jeonnam Dragons	9	9	9	9	9	10	10	10	10	10	10	10	10	10	10	10	10	10	10	10	10	11

Source: K League

== Results ==
Home \ Away	ASG	AYG	BCN	BSI	CNAS	DJC	GIM	GJU	GNM	JND	SUE	ASG	AYG	BCN	BSI	CNAS	DJC	GIM	GJU	GNM	JND	SUE
Ansan Greeners	—	1–2	3–0	1–1	0–1	1–2	1–1	0–2	2–2	3–0	0–1	—	1–4	1–2	3–1	2–2	1–2	3–1	0–0	2–3	1–7	1–1
FC Anyang	1–1	—	4–2	1–0	2–0	2–2	3–2	2–2	2–3	1–0	0–0	2–0	—	1–0	1–0	1–1	0–1	0–0	1–2	1–0	3–1	1–0
Bucheon FC 1995	2–1	2–0	—	3–1	0–0	2–1	1–0	2–0	0–1	2–1	0–0	3–3	0–1	—	1–1	2–1	2–0	0–1	2–1	3–1	2–2	0–0
Busan IPark	2–0	1–1	0–1	—	3–1	1–1	2–0	0–3	1–1	0–2	1–2	0–1	0–1	0–2	—	4–0	1–3	0–3	0–2	1–0	1–1	1–0
Chungnam Asan	0–0	2–0	0–0	1–0	—	0–3	2–1	0–2	2–2	1–0	0–0	3–1	0–0	0–3	0–2	—	1–0	0–1	0–0	2–1	4–0	2–1
Daejeon Hana Citizen	0–0	1–1	1–0	4–3	2–1	—	4–4	1–1	4–1	3–2	2–1	2–0	2–3	3–1	3–0	1–1	—	1–1	2–2	3–0	2–1	3–1
Gimpo FC	1–1	0–1	2–1	1–0	0–4	1–2	—	1–2	2–1	2–2	2–2	0–3	0–2	1–1	0–0	1–0	0–3	—	0–0	1–3	1–1	0–3
Gwangju FC	2–0	4–0	1–0	1–0	2–1	2–0	1–2	—	1–4	1–0	2–1	3–0	0–0	2–1	1–0	3–2	1–0	2–1	—	4–0	1–1	1–0
Gyeongnam FC	2–1	2–3	2–3	3–2	0–0	1–1	6–1	1–2	—	1–2	0–1	2–1	1–0	0–3	1–0	0–1	2–1	1–0	2–2	—	2–0	3–1
Jeonnam Dragons	1–1	2–0	2–1	0–0	0–0	0–1	0–2	1–1	2–2	—	1–1	2–3	2–2	1–1	0–1	1–3	1–1	0–1	2–3	1–1	—	3–0
Seoul E-Land	2–3	0–0	1–1	2–2	0–0	0–1	3–1	2–2	2–1	1–1	—	2–2	3–2	3–0	0–1	3–0	2–1	3–0	0–4	0–1	1–1	—

Source: K League
Legend: Blue = home team win; Yellow = draw; Red = away team win.

== Promotion play-offs ==
The first round was contested between the fourth and fifth-placed teams, and its winners played the third-placed team in the second round. When the first and second round matches were finished as draws, their winners were decided on the regular season rankings without extra time and penalty shoot-outs.

The winners of the second round and the runners-up competed with the tenth and eleven-placed team of the K League 1, respectively, in the final round for the K League 1 spots of the next season. Each match of the final round was a two-legged tie.

=== Bracket ===
First round
4	Bucheon FC 1995	2
5	Gyeongnam FC	3

Second round
3	FC Anyang	0
5	Gyeongnam FC	0

Final 1
FC Anyang	0	1	1
Suwon Samsung Bluewings (a.e.t.)	0	2	2
Final 2
Daejeon Hana Citizen	2	4	6
Gimcheon Sangmu	1	0	1

=== First round ===
19 October 2022
19:00 KST

Bucheon FC 1995	2–3	Gyeongnam FC
Lee Dong-hee 61'; Song Hong-min 78'	Report	Mo Jae-hyeon 56'; Lee Kwang-jin 74'; Tiago Orobó 90+5'

Bucheon Stadium, Bucheon
Attendance: 2,119
Referee: Kim Dae-yong

=== Second round ===
23 October 2022
13:00 KST

FC Anyang	0–0	Gyeongnam FC
	Report

Anyang Stadium, Anyang
Attendance: 3,641
Referee: Jung Dong-sik

=== Final round ===
Team 1	Agg.	Team 2	1st leg	2nd leg
FC Anyang	1–2	Suwon Samsung Bluewings	0–0	1–2 (a.e.t.)
Daejeon Hana Citizen	6–1	Gimcheon Sangmu	2–1	4–0

26 October 2022
19:30 UTC+9

FC Anyang	0–0	Suwon Samsung Bluewings
	Report

Anyang Stadium, Anyang
Attendance: 4,863
Referee: Kim Jong-hyeok
29 October 2022
14:00 UTC+9

Suwon Samsung Bluewings	2–1 (a.e.t.)	FC Anyang
An Byong-jun 17'; Oh Hyeon-gyu 120'	Report	Acosty 55'

Suwon World Cup Stadium, Suwon
Attendance: 12,842
Referee: Lee Dong-jun

Suwon Samsung Bluewings won 2–1 on aggregate and therefore both clubs remain in their respective leagues.

26 October 2022
19:30 UTC+9

Daejeon Hana Citizen	2–1	Gimcheon Sangmu
Cho Yu-min 36'; Ju Se-jong 74'	Report	Mun Ji-hwan 22'

Daejeon World Cup Stadium, Daejeon
Attendance: 8,545
Referee: Lee Dong-jun
29 October 2022
16:00 UTC+9

Gimcheon Sangmu	0–4	Daejeon Hana Citizen
	Report	Lee Jin-hyun 31', 53'; Kim In-gyun 74'; Kim Seung-sub 84'

Gimcheon Stadium, Gimcheon
Attendance: 2,918
Referee: Kim Jong-hyeok

Daejeon Hana Citizen won 6–1 on aggregate and was promoted to K League 1, while Gimcheon Sangmu was relegated to K League 2.

== Statistics ==
=== Top goalscorers ===
Rank	Player	Club	Goals
1	(South Korea) Yu Kang-hyun	Chungnam Asan	19
1	(Brazil) Tiago Orobó	Gyeongnam FC	19
3	(Brazil) Willyan	Gyeongnam FC; Daejeon Hana Citizen	13
4	(Brazil) Reis	Gwangju FC	12
5	(Argentina) Felipe Cadenazzi	Seoul E-Land	10
5	(Japan) Masatoshi Ishida	Daejeon Hana Citizen	10
7	(South Korea) Eom Ji-sung	Gwangju FC	9
7	(Costa Rica) Jonathan Moya	FC Anyang	9
7	(Brazil) Leandro Ribeiro	Daejeon Hana Citizen	9
10	(Brazil) Hernandes	Gyeongnam FC	8
10	(South Korea) Yun Min-ho	Gimpo FC	8
10	(South Korea) Son Suk-yong	Gimpo FC	8

=== Top assist providers ===
Rank	Player	Club	Assists
1	(Ghana) Boadu Maxwell Acosty	FC Anyang	11
2	(South Korea) Lee Euddeum	Gwangju FC	9
3	(South Korea) Lee Kwang-jin	Gyeongnam FC	8
4	(Brazil) Róbson Duarte	Ansan Greeners	7
4	(South Korea) Son Suk-yong	Gimpo FC	7
6	(South Korea) Park Kwang-il	Gyeongnam FC	6
6	(South Korea) Choi Jun	Busan IPark	6
6	(South Korea) Mo Jae-hyeon	Gyeongnam FC	6
6	(South Korea) Park Han-bin	Gwangju FC	6
10	5 Players		5

== Awards ==
=== Weekly awards ===
Round	Player of the Round	
Round	Player	Club
1	(South Korea) Kim Jong-suk	Gimpo FC
2	(Brazil) Reis	Gwangju FC
3	(Brazil) Hernandes	Gyeongnam FC
4	(South Korea) Lee Euddeum	Gwangju FC
5	(South Korea) Yu Kang-hyun	Chungnam Asan
6	(South Korea) Ha Nam	Gyeongnam FC
7	(Japan) Masatoshi Ishida	Daejeon Hana Citizen
8	(South Korea) Kim Kyung-jung	FC Anyang
9	(South Korea) Kim Seung-seob	Daejeon Hana Citizen
10	(South Korea) Cho Yu-min	Daejeon Hana Citizen
11	(South Korea) Im Eun-su	Daejeon Hana Citizen
12	(South Korea) Kim Myoung-jun	Gyeongnam FC
13	(Brazil) Tiago Orobó	Gyeongnam FC
14	(South Korea) Lee Sang-heon	Busan IPark
15	(South Korea) Heo Yool	Gwangju FC
16	(South Korea) Lee Jin-hyun	Daejeon Hana Citizen
17	(Brazil) Anderson Canhoto	Ansan Greeners
18	(South Korea) Lee Euddeum	Gwangju FC
19	(Brazil) Willyan	Gyeongnam FC
20	(Brazil) Anderson Canhoto	Ansan Greeners
21	(South Korea) Son Suk-yong	Gimpo FC
22	(Brazil) Róbson Duarte	Ansan Greeners

Round	Player of the Round	
Round	Player	Club
23	(Brazil) Hernandes	Gyeongnam FC
24	(Brazil) Andrigo	FC Anyang
25	(South Korea) Son Suk-yong	Gimpo FC
26	(South Korea) Yu Kang-hyun	Chungnam Asan
27	(Brazil) Leandro Ribeiro	Daejeon Hana Citizen
28	(South Korea) Cho Hyun-taek	Bucheon FC 1995
29	(Brazil) Tiago Orobó	Gyeongnam FC
30	(Brazil) Thiago Henrique	Ansan Greeners
31	(Ghana) Boadu Maxwell Acosty	FC Anyang
32	(Brazil) Willyan	Daejeon Hana Citizen
33	(Brazil) Andrigo	FC Anyang
34	(Ghana) Boadu Maxwell Acosty	FC Anyang
35	(South Korea) Yu Kang-hyun	Chungnam Asan
36	(South Korea) Lee Si-heon	Bucheon FC 1995
37	(South Korea) Lee Chang-yong	FC Anyang
38	(Brazil) Sandro Lima	Gwangju FC
39	(Brazil) Jonathan Balotelli	Jeonnam Dragons
40	(Brazil) Nilson	Bucheon FC 1995
41	(Japan) Masatoshi Ishida	Daejeon Hana Citizen
42	(South Korea) Kim Jeong-hwan	Seoul E-Land
43	(Brazil) Leandro Ribeiro	Daejeon Hana Citizen
44	(South Korea) Jung Won-jin	Busan IPark

=== Monthly awards ===
Month	Manager of the Month		
Month	Manager	Club	Division
February/March	(South Korea) Hong Myung-bo	Ulsan Hyundai	1
April	(South Korea) Lee Jung-hyo	Gwangju FC	2
May	(South Korea) Nam Ki-il	Jeju United	1
June	(South Korea) Kim Do-kyun	Suwon FC	1
July	(South Korea) Kim Sang-sik	Jeonbuk Hyundai Motors	1
August	(South Korea) Jo Sung-hwan	Incheon United	1
September	(South Korea) Lee Jung-hyo	Gwangju FC	2
October	(South Korea) Choi Won-kwon	Daegu FC	1

=== Annual awards ===
The 2022 K League Awards was held on 24 October 2022.

Award	Winner	Club
Most Valuable Player	(South Korea) Ahn Young-kyu	Gwangju FC
Young Player of the Year	(South Korea) Eom Ji-sung	Gwangju FC
Top goalscorer	(South Korea) Yu Kang-hyun	Chungnam Asan
Top assist provider	(Ghana) Boadu Maxwell Acosty	FC Anyang
Manager of the Year	(South Korea) Lee Jung-hyo	Gwangju FC

Position	Best XI			
Goalkeeper	(South Korea) Kim Kyeong-min (Gwangju)			
Defenders	(South Korea) Doo Hyeon-seok (Gwangju)	(South Korea) Cho Yu-min (Daejeon)	(South Korea) Ahn Young-kyu (Gwangju)	(South Korea) Cho Hyun-taek (Bucheon)
Midfielders	(South Korea) Eom Ji-sung (Gwangju)	(South Korea) Lee Soon-min (Gwangju)	(South Korea) Park Han-bin (Gwangju)	(Brazil) Willyan (Gyeongnam, Daejeon)
Forwards	(Brazil) Tiago Orobó (Gyeongnam)		(South Korea) Yu Kang-hyun (Chungnam Asan)	

== See also ==
- 2022 in South Korean football
- 2022 Korean FA Cup
