= 2022 Korean FA Cup =

2022 Hana 1Q FA Cup

Tournament details
- Country: South Korea
- Dates: 19 February – 30 October 2022
- Teams: 60

Final positions
- Champions: Jeonbuk Hyundai Motors (5th title)
- Runners-up: FC Seoul
- Champions League: Jeonbuk Hyundai Motors

Tournament statistics
- Matches played: 58
- Goals scored: 189 (3.26 per match)
- Top goal scorer: Heo Yong-joon (4 goals)

Awards
- Best player: Cho Gue-sung

The 2022 Korean FA Cup, known as the 2022 Hana 1Q FA Cup due to sponsorship agreement with Hana Bank, was the 27th edition of the Korean FA Cup.

Defending champions Jeonnam Dragons were defeated by Busan Transportation Corporation in the round of 16.

== Schedule ==
Round	Date	Matches	Clubs remaining	Clubs involved	New entries this round
First round	19–20 February	16	60	32	11 K3 League teams 13 K4 League teams 8 K5 League teams
Second round	9 March	16	44	16+16	1 K League 1 team 10 K League 2 teams 5 K3 League teams
Third round	27 April	12	28	16+8	8 K League 1 teams
Round of 16	25 May	8	16	12+4	4 Champions League teams
Quarter-finals	29 June	4	8	8	None
Semi-finals	5 October	2	4	4	None
Final	27–30 October	2	2	2	None

== Bracket ==
Round of 16 (Fourth round)
Jeonbuk Hyundai Motors	1
Ulsan Citizen	0
Suwon Samsung Bluewings	2
Gangwon FC	0
Ulsan Hyundai	2
Gyeongnam FC	0
Bucheon FC 1995	2
Gwangju FC	1
FC Seoul	3
Jeju United	1
Busan Transportation Corporation (p)	2 (5)
Jeonnam Dragons	2 (4)
Daegu FC (p)	3 (5)
Daejeon Korail	3 (4)
Pohang Steelers	2
Seongnam FC	1

Quarter-finals (Fifth round)
Jeonbuk Hyundai Motors	3
Suwon Samsung Bluewings	0
Ulsan Hyundai (p)	1 (6)
Bucheon FC 1995	1 (5)
FC Seoul	3
Busan Transportation Corporation	0
Daegu FC	3
Pohang Steelers	2

Semi-finals (Sixth round)
Jeonbuk Hyundai Motors (a.e.t.)	2
Ulsan Hyundai	1
FC Seoul (a.e.t.)	1
Daegu FC	0

Final (Seventh round)
Jeonbuk Hyundai Motors	2	3	5
FC Seoul	2	1	3

== First round ==
The draw was held on 7 February 2022.

19 February 2022	Suwon City (5)	0–5	Ulsan Citizen (3)	Suwon Sports Complex 2, Suwon
14:00 (UTC+9)				Attendance: 101

20 February 2022	Seobu (Western) FC (5)	0–6	Cheongju FC (3)	Daejeon Anyeong Life Sports Park, Daejeon
14:00 (UTC+9)				Attendance: 0 (behind closed doors)

19 February 2022	Jeongeup Phoenix (5)	1–7	Paju Citizen (3)	Shintaein Artificial Turf Stadium, Jeongeup
14:00 (UTC+9)				Attendance: 45

20 February 2022	Hyochang FC (5)	0–9	Hwaseong FC (3)	Gwangju Boramae Football Park, Gwangju
14:00 (UTC+9)				Attendance: 0 (behind closed doors)

19 February 2022	Geoje Citizen (4)	0–5	Daejeon Korail (3)	Geoje Stadium, Geoje
14:00 (UTC+9)				Attendance: 215

20 February 2022	Cheongsol (5)	1–5	Pyeongchang United (4)	Daegu Dalseong Sports Park, Dalseong County, Daegu
14:00 (UTC+9)				Attendance: 0 (behind closed doors)

19 February 2022	Yeoju FC (4)	0–1	Seoul Nowon United (4)	Yeoju Stadium], Yeoju
14:00 (UTC+9)				Attendance: 80

20 February 2022	Chungju Citizen (4)	2–3 (a.e.t.)	Dangjin Citizen (3)	Chungju Tangeumdae Football Stadium, Chungju
14:00 (UTC+9)				Attendance: 120

19 February 2022	Jaemix FC (5)	2–5	Seoul Jungnang (4)	Gimhae Civil Sports Park, Gimhae
14:00 (UTC+9)				Attendance: 186

Cancelled	TNT Fitogether (5)	Cancelled	~~Goyang Citizen (4)~~	Cancelled
Note: The match was cancelled due to the disqualification of Goyang Citizen by the Korea Football Association, and TNT Fitogether advanced to the second round on a walkover.

19 February 2022	Chuncheon FC (4)	2–1	Yangju Citizen FC (3)	Chuncheon Songam Sports Town 2, Chuncheon
14:00 (UTC+9)				Attendance: 111

20 February 2022	Pocheon Citizen (3)	2–0	Gangneung Citizen (3)	Pocheon Stadium, Pocheon
14:00 (UTC+9)				Attendance: 35

19 February 2022	Seogot SM (5)	0–5	Yangpyeong FC (4)	Incheon Dong-gu Municipal Stadium, Incheon
14:00 (UTC+9)				Attendance: 45

20 February 2022	Jeonju Citizen (4)	1–2	FC Namdong (4)	Jeonju Stadium, Jeonju
14:00 (UTC+9)				Attendance: 33

19 February 2022	Changwon FC (3)	4–2	Jinju Citizen (4)	Changwon Football Center 2, Changwon
14:00 (UTC+9)				Attendance: 0 (behind closed doors)

20 February 2022	Pyeongtaek Citizen (4)	0–2	Siheung Citizen (3)	Pyeongtaek Ichung Leports Town, Pyeongtaek
14:00 (UTC+9)				Attendance: 57

== Second round ==
The draw was held on 7 February 2022.

Cancelled	Ulsan Citizen (3)	Cancelled	~~FC Mokpo (3)~~	Cancelled
Note: The match was cancelled due to a COVID-19 outbreak in FC Mokpo's squad.

9 March 2022	Busan IPark (2)	6–3	Cheongju FC (3)	Busan Asiad Main Stadium, Busan
14:00 (UTC+9)

9 March 2022	Paju Citizen (3)	2–2 (a.e.t.) (1–3 p)	Gimcheon Sangmu (1)	Paju Stadium, Paju
14:00 (UTC+9)

9 March 2022	Daejeon Hana Citizen (2)	0–0 (a.e.t.) (3–4 p)	Hwaseong FC (3)	Daejeon World Cup Stadium, Daejeon
14:00 (UTC+9)

9 March 2022	Daejeon Korail (3)	0–0 (a.e.t.) (5–3 p)	Cheonan City (3)	Daejeon World Cup Auxiliary Stadium, Daejeon
14:00 (UTC+9)

9 March 2022	Ansan Greeners (2)	1–2	Pyeongchang United (4)	Ansan Wa~ Stadium, Ansan
14:00 (UTC+9)

9 March 2022	Gimhae FC (3)	3–1 (a.e.t.)	Seoul Nowon United (4)	Gimhae Stadium, Gimhae
14:00 (UTC+9)

9 March 2022	Dangjin Citizen (3)	0–3	Chungnam Asan (2)	Dangjin Stadium, Dangjin
14:00 (UTC+9)

9 March 2022	Gyeongnam FC (2)	2–0	Seoul Jungnang (4)	Miryang Stadium, Miryang
14:00 (UTC+9)

9 March 2022	Gyeongju KHNP (3)	1–0	TNT Fitogether (5)	Gyeongju Civic Stadium, Gyeongju
14:00 (UTC+9)

9 March 2022	Chuncheon Citizen (4)	1–1 (a.e.t.) (4–5 p)	Bucheon FC 1995 (2)	Chuncheon Songam Sports Town 2, Chuncheon
14:00 (UTC+9)

9 March 2022	Gwangju FC (2)	1–0	Pocheon Citizen (3)	Gwangju Football Stadium, Gwangju
14:00 (UTC+9)

9 March 2022	Yangpyeong FC (4)	0–0 (a.e.t.) (3–4 p)	Gimpo FC (2)	Mulmalgeun Yangpyeong Stadium, Yangpyeong
14:00 (UTC+9)

9 March 2022	Busan Transportation Corporation (3)	2–1	FC Namdong (4)	Busan Asiad Main Stadium 2, Busan
14:00 (UTC+9)

9 March 2022	Changwon FC (3)	1–1 (a.e.t.) (4–3 p)	Seoul E-Land (2)	Changwon Stadium, Changwon
14:00 (UTC+9)				Attendance: 0 (Behind closed door)

9 March 2022	FC Anyang (2)	1–0	Siheung Citizen (3)	Anyang Stadium, Anyang
14:00 (UTC+9)

== Third round ==
The draw was held on 7 February 2022.

27 April 2022	Gimcheon Sangmu (1)	1–1 (a.e.t.) (3–4 p)	Suwon Samsung Bluewings (1)	Gimcheon Stadium, Gimcheon
15:00 (UTC+9)	Kim Ji-hyeon 90'		Jeong Seung-won 10'	Attendance: 522
	Penalties
	Kwon Hyeok-kyu (penalty scored); Kim Ji-hyeon (penalty scored); Lee Yeong-jae (penalty scored); Cho Gue-sung (penalty missed); Kwon Chang-hoon (penalty missed)		(penalty missed) Yeom Ki-hun; (penalty scored) Lee Ki-Je; (penalty scored) Min Sang-gi; (penalty scored) Jeong Seung-won; (penalty scored) Sarić

27 April 2022	Ulsan Citizen (3)	2–0	Busan IPark (2)	Ulsan Stadium, Ulsan
19:00 (UTC+9)	Kim Hun-ok 24'; Lee Hyung-kyung 82'

27 April 2022	Gangwon FC (1)	2–0	Hwaseong FC (3)	Chuncheon Songam Sports Town, Chuncheon
19:00 (UTC+9)	Kim Dae-won 28'; Kang Ji-hoon 47'

27 April 2022	Daejeon Korail (3)	2–1 (a.e.t.)	Pyeongchang United (4)	Daejeon World Cup Auxiliary Stadium, Daejeon
19:00 (UTC+9)	Park Chan-bin 32'; Bang Chan-jun 116'		Kim Chong-hyun 3'

27 April 2022	Gimhae FC (3)	0–5	Pohang Steelers (1)	Gimhae Stadium, Gimhae
19:00 (UTC+9)			Wanderson 18'; Jeong Jae-hee 77', 79'; Lee Ho-jae 84', 90'

27 April 2022	Seongnam FC (1)	1–0	Chungnam Asan (2)	Tancheon Stadium, Seongnam
19:00 (UTC+9)	Park Soo-il 90'

27 April 2022	Gyeongnam FC (2)	2–0	Gyeongju KHNP (3)	Miryang Stadium. Miryang
19:00 (UTC+9)	Ha Nam 58'; Tiago Orobó 81'

27 April 2022	Bucheon FC 1995 (2)	1–0	Suwon FC (1)	Bucheon Stadium, Bucheon
19:00 (UTC+9)	Choi Jae-young 31'

27 April 2022	Incheon United (1)	1–6	Gwangju FC (2)	Incheon Football Stadium, Incheon
19:00 (UTC+9)	Hong Si-hoo 79'		Kim Jin-young 2', 54'; Ha Seung-woon 27'; Park Joon-gang 31'; Heo Yool 72'; Mike 87'

27 April 2022	Gimpo FC (2)	1–2 (a.e.t.)	Busan Transportation Corporation (3)	Gimpo Solteo Football Field, Gimpo
19:00 (UTC+9)	Park Jae-woo 72'		Kim So-woong 10'; Lee Min-woo 113'

27 April 2022	Changwon FC (3)	0–0 (a.e.t.) (3–4 p)	FC Seoul (1)	Changwon Stadium, Changwon
19:00 (UTC+9)
	Penalties
	Luan Costa (penalty missed); Jin Se-min (penalty scored); Lee Seung-jun (penalty missed); Ha Ji-hoon (penalty scored); Han Ji-won (penalty scored); Kim Pyeong-hyeob (penalty missed)		Na Sang-ho (penalty scored); Osmar (penalty scored); Lee Han-beom (penalty missed); Kim Shin-jin (penalty missed); Cho Young-wook (penalty scored); Paločević (penalty scored)

27 April 2022	Jeju United (1)	3–0 (a.e.t.)	FC Anyang (2)	Jeju World Cup Stadium, Seogwipo
19:00 (UTC+9)	Joo Min-kyu 98'; Kim Bong-soo 114'; Lee Chang-min 117'

== Round of 16 ==
The draw was held on 7 February 2022.

25 May 2022	Jeonbuk Hyundai Motors (1)	1–0	Ulsan Citizen (3)	Jeonju World Cup Stadium, Jeonju
19:00 (UTC+9)	Gustavo 15'			Attendance: 1,497

25 May 2022	Suwon Samsung Bluewings (1)	2–0	Gangwon FC (1)	Suwon World Cup Stadium, Suwon
19:00 (UTC+9)	Kang Hyun-muk 31'; Grønning 40'			Attendance: 983

25 May 2022	Daejeon Korail (3)	3–3 (a.e.t.) (4–5 p)	Daegu FC (1)	Daejeon World Cup Auxiliary Stadium, Daejeon
19:00 (UTC+9)	Cheon Ji-hyeon 38'; Ahn Sang-min 60' (pen.); Song Soo-young 90+4'		Kim Jin-hyuk 51'; Zeca 69'; Jeong Tae-wook 74'	Attendance: 512
	Penalties
	Park Yo-han (penalty scored); Kim Seon-woo (penalty scored); Bang Chan-jun (penalty scored); Ahn Sang-min (penalty scored); Song Soo-young (penalty missed)		(penalty scored) Hong Chul; (penalty scored) Bruno Lamas; (penalty scored) Zeca; (penalty scored) Lee Keun-ho; (penalty scored) Césinha

25 May 2022	Pohang Steelers (1)	2–1	Seongnam FC (1)	Pohang Steel Yard, Pohang
19:00 (UTC+9)	Heo Yong-joon 68', 90+3'		Kang Jae-woo 57'	Attendance: 1,537

25 May 2022	Gyeongnam FC (2)	0–2	Ulsan Hyundai (1)	Changwon Football Center, Changwon
19:00 (UTC+9)			Amano 39'; Koszta 49'	Attendance: 1,349

25 May 2022	Bucheon FC 1995 (2)	2–1	Gwangju FC (2)	Bucheon Stadium, Bucheon
19:00 (UTC+9)	Nnamani 23'; Ahn Jae-jun 81'		Lee Hee-gyun 90+1'	Attendance: 525

25 May 2022	Jeonnam Dragons (2)	2–2 (a.e.t.) (4–5 p)	Busan Transportation Corporation (3)	Gwangyang Football Stadium, Gwangyang
19:00 (UTC+9)	In Seok-hwan 15' (o.g.); Jung Woo-bin 36'		Park Tae-hong 18'; Lee Min-woo 90+4' (pen.)	Attendance: 444
	Penalties
	Jeon Seung-min (penalty scored); Park In-hyeok (penalty scored); Choi Ho-jung (penalty scored); Park Hee-seong (penalty scored); Ko Tae-won (penalty missed); Kim Tae-hyeon (penalty missed)		(penalty scored) Shin Young-jun; (penalty scored) Jeong Hyeon-sik; (penalty scored) Ahn Jae-hun; (penalty missed) Lee Je-seung; (penalty scored) Lee Min-woo; (penalty scored) Park Tae-hong

25 May 2022	FC Seoul (1)	3–1	Jeju United (1)	Seoul World Cup Stadium, Seoul
19:00 (UTC+9)	Paločević 55', 78'; Cho Young-wook 56'		Joo Min-kyu 24'	Attendance: 555

== Quarter-finals ==
The draw was held on 7 February 2022.

29 June 2022	Jeonbuk Hyundai Motors (1)	3–0	Suwon Samsung Bluewings (1)	Jeonju World Cup Stadium, Jeonju
19:00 (UTC+9)	Gustavo 40'; Kim Jin-gyu 45+1'; Han Kyo-won 90+4'	Report		Attendance: 2,286; Referee: Jeong Dong-sik

29 June 2022	Daegu FC (1)	3–2	Pohang Steelers (1)	DGB Daegu Bank Park, Daegu
19:00 (UTC+9)	Hong Jeong-woon 21'; Zeca 30'; Go Jae-hyun 44'	Report	Heo Yong-joon 12', 68'	Attendance: 3,762; Referee: Kim Jong-hyeok

29 June 2022	Ulsan Hyundai (1)	1–1 (a.e.t.) (6–5 p)	Bucheon FC 1995 (2)	Ulsan Munsu Football Stadium, Ulsan
19:00 (UTC+9)	Lee Yong-hyeok 48' (o.g.)	Report	Lee Eui-hyeong 33'	Attendance: 1,250; Referee: Kim Yong-woo
	Penalties
	Léo Souza (penalty scored); Qazaishvili (penalty scored); Kim Kee-hee (penalty scored); Lee Chung-yong (penalty scored); Won Du-jae (penalty scored); Kim Seong-jun (penalty scored)		(penalty scored) Choi Jae-young; (penalty scored) Park Chang-jun; (penalty scored) Ahn Jae-jun; (penalty scored) Yun Ji-hyeok; (penalty scored) Lee Pung-yeon; (penalty missed) Guk Tae-jeong

29 June 2022	Busan Transportation Corporation (3)	0–3	FC Seoul (1)	Busan Asiad Auxiliary Stadium, Busan
19:00 (UTC+9)		Report	Paločević 30'; Park Dong-jin 46'; Kim Shin-jin 85'	Attendance: 461; Referee: Song Min-seok

== Semi-finals ==
The draw was held on 18 July 2022.

5 October 2022	Ulsan Hyundai (1)	1–2 (a.e.t.)	Jeonbuk Hyundai Motors (1)	Ulsan Munsu Football Stadium, Ulsan
19:00 (UTC+9)	Won Du-jae 13'	Report	Barrow 40'; Cho Gue-sung 109'	Attendance: 5,818; Referee: Shim Byeong-jin

5 October 2022	Daegu FC (1)	0–1 (a.e.t.)	FC Seoul (1)	DGB Daegu Bank Park, Daegu
19:00 (UTC+9)		Report	Na Sang-ho 120+1'	Attendance: 5,433; Referee: Ko Hyung-jin

== Final ==
27 October 2022 First leg	FC Seoul (1)	2–2	Jeonbuk Hyundai Motors (1)	Seoul World Cup Stadium, Seoul
19:00 (UTC+9)	Ki Sung-yueng 3'; Cho Young-wook 38'	Report	Barrow 43'; Cho Gue-sung 45+2' (pen.)	Attendance: 14,705; Referee: Jeong Dong-sik

30 October 2022 Second leg	Jeonbuk Hyundai Motors (1)	3–1 (5–3 agg.)	FC Seoul (1)	Jeonju World Cup Stadium, Jeonju
14:00 (UTC+9)	Barrow 11'; Cho Gue-sung 45+1', 90'	Report	Park Dong-jin 69'	Attendance: 17,427; Referee: Shin Yong-jun

== See also ==
- 2022 in South Korean football
- 2022 K League 1
- 2022 K League 2
- 2022 K3 League
- 2022 K4 League
