= Lee Eun-beom =

South Korean footballer

Personal information
- Full name: Lee Eun-beom
- Date of birth: 30 January 1996 (age 30)
- Place of birth: South Korea
- Height: 1.82 m (6 ft 0 in)
- Position: Forward

Team information
- Current team: Chungnam Asan FC
- Number: 47

Youth career
- 2015–2016: Seonam University

Senior career*
Years	Team	Apps	(Gls)
2017–2019	Jeju United	7	(0)
2019	Seongnam FC	7	(0)
2020	Jeju United FC	1	(0)
2020-	Chungnam Asan FC	96	(2)

International career^{‡}
2017–	South Korea U-23	0	(0)
- * Club domestic league appearances and goals as of 11 October 2022 ‡ National team caps and goals as of 2 January 2018

- Lee Eun-beom
- Hangul: 이은범
- RR: I Eunbeom
- MR: I Ŭnbŏm

Lee Eun-beom (Korean: 이은범; born 30 January 1996) is a South Korean football forward who plays for Chungnam Asan FC.
