= Park Min-seo =

Korean association football player

Personal information
- Date of birth: 30 June 1998 (age 28)
- Place of birth: South Korea
- Height: 1.83 m (6 ft 0 in)
- Position: Forward

Team information
- Current team: Jincheon HR (on loan from Gyeongnam FC)
- Number: 19

Youth career
- –2018: Honam University

Senior career*
Years	Team	Apps	(Gls)
2019–2023	Chungnam Asan FC	86	(9)
2023–	Gyeongnam FC	86	(7)
2026–	→ Jincheon HR (loan)	0	(0)
- * Club domestic league appearances and goals as of 20 March 2026

- Park Min-seo
- Hangul: 박민서
- Hanja: 朴敏硕
- RR: Bak Minseo
- MR: Pak Minsŏ

Park Min-seo (Korean: 박민서; born 30 June 1998) is a South Korean footballer currently playing as a forward for K4 League club Jincheon HR on loan from Gyeongnam FC.

== Career statistics ==
=== Club ===
As of 8 March 2019.

Club	Season	League			Cup		Other		Total	
Club	Season	Division	Apps	Goals	Apps	Goals	Apps	Goals	Apps	Goals
Asan Mugunghwa	2019	K League 2	1	1	0	0	0	0	1	1
Career total			1	1	0	0	0	0	1	1
