= Kim Jong-woo =

South Korean footballer (born 1993)

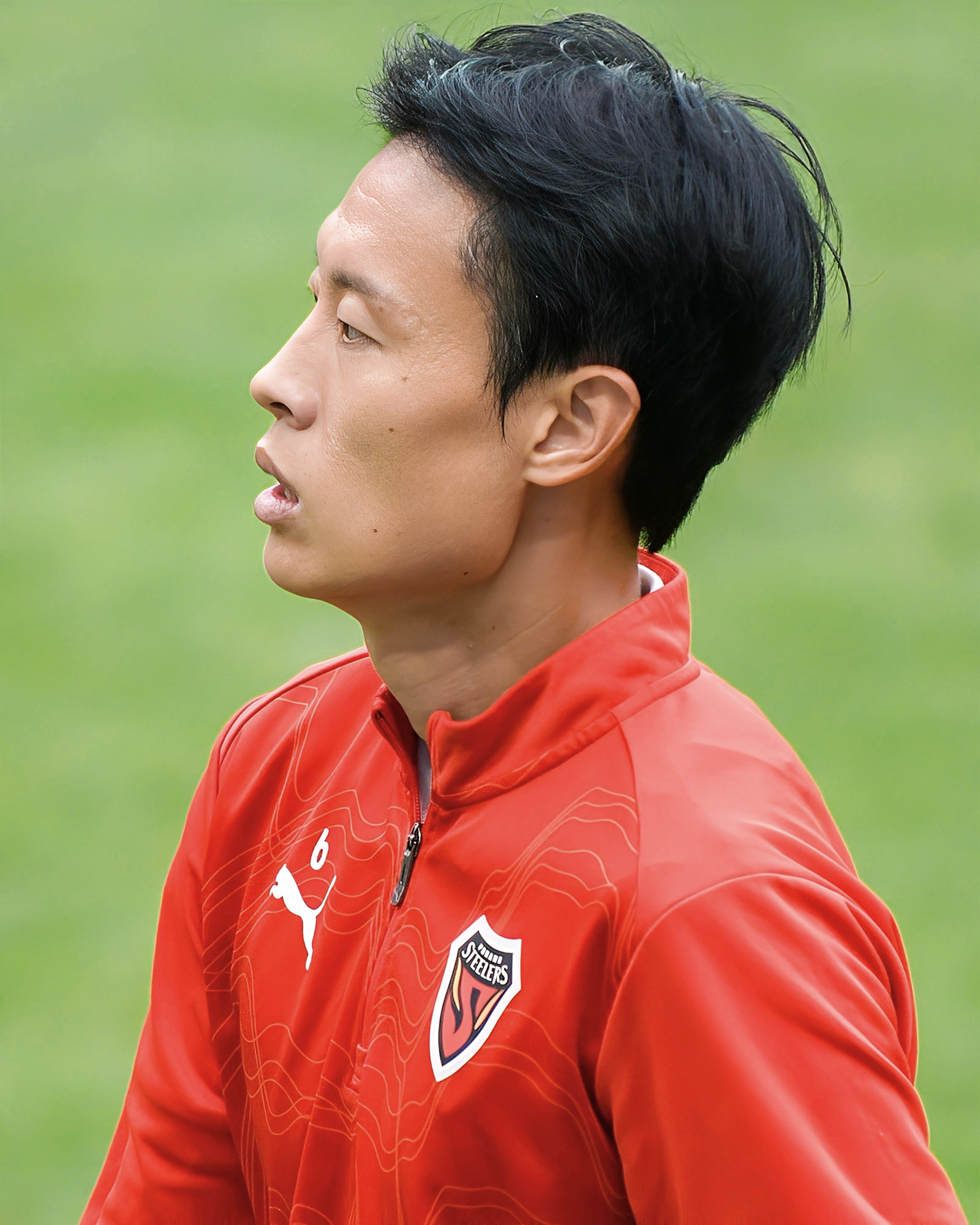
- Kim in 2025

Personal information
- Date of birth: 1 October 1993 (age 33)
- Place of birth: Suwon, South Korea
- Height: 1.81 m (5 ft 11 in)
- Position: Midfielder

Team information
- Current team: Bucheon
- Number: 14

Senior career*
Years	Team	Apps	(Gls)
2015–2020	Suwon Samsung Bluewings	76	(6)
2015	→ Suwon FC (loan)	30	(4)
2021–2023	Gwangju FC	41	(8)
2023–2025	Pohang Steelers	58	(2)
2026–	Bucheon	13	(0)
- * Club domestic league appearances and goals as of 4 August 2026

Kim Jong-woo (Korean: 김종우; born 1 October 1993) is a South Korean footballer who plays as a midfielder for K League 1 club Bucheon.

== Career ==
Kim started his career with South Korean top flight side Suwon Samsung Bluewings, where he played from 2015 to 2020.

For the 2015 season, he was sent on loan to Suwon FC in the K League 2, the second division of South Korean football.

== Career statistics ==
As of 4 August 2026.

Appearances and goals by club, season and competition
Club	Season	League			Cup		International		Other		Total	
Club	Season	Division	Apps	Goals	Apps	Goals	Apps	Goals	Apps	Goals	Apps	Goals
Suwon Samsung Bluewings	2016	K League 1	3	0	1	0	5	0	—		9	0
Suwon Samsung Bluewings	2017	K League 1	25	2	3	0	5	1	—		33	3
Suwon Samsung Bluewings	2018	K League 1	24	4	3	1	5	0	—		32	5
Suwon Samsung Bluewings	2019	K League 1	21	0	4	0	—		—		25	0
Suwon Samsung Bluewings	2020	K League 1	3	0	0	0	0	0	—		25	3
Suwon Samsung Bluewings	Total		76	6	11	1	15	1	—		102	8
Suwon FC (loan)	2015	K League 2	31	4	0	0	—		4	0	35	4
Gwangju FC	2021	K League 1	19	5	0	0	—		—		19	5
Gwangju FC	2022	K League 2	22	3	3	0	—		—		25	3
Gwangju FC	Total		41	8	3	0	—		—		44	8
Pohang Steelers	2023	K League 1	20	0	2	1	4 (Note: Appearances in AFC Champions League Elite)	0	—		22	1
Pohang Steelers	2024	K League 1	25	2	3	0	4	0	—		34	2
Pohang Steelers	2025	K League 1	13	0	0	0	6	0	—		19	0
Pohang Steelers	Total		58	2	5	1	14	0	—		77	3
Bucheon FC 1995	2026	K League 1	13	0	0	0	—		—		13	0
Career total			219	20	19	2	29	1	4	0	271	23

== Honours ==
Individual

- Korean FA Cup Most Valuable Player: 2023
