= Yu Kang-hyun =

South Korean footballer (born 1996)

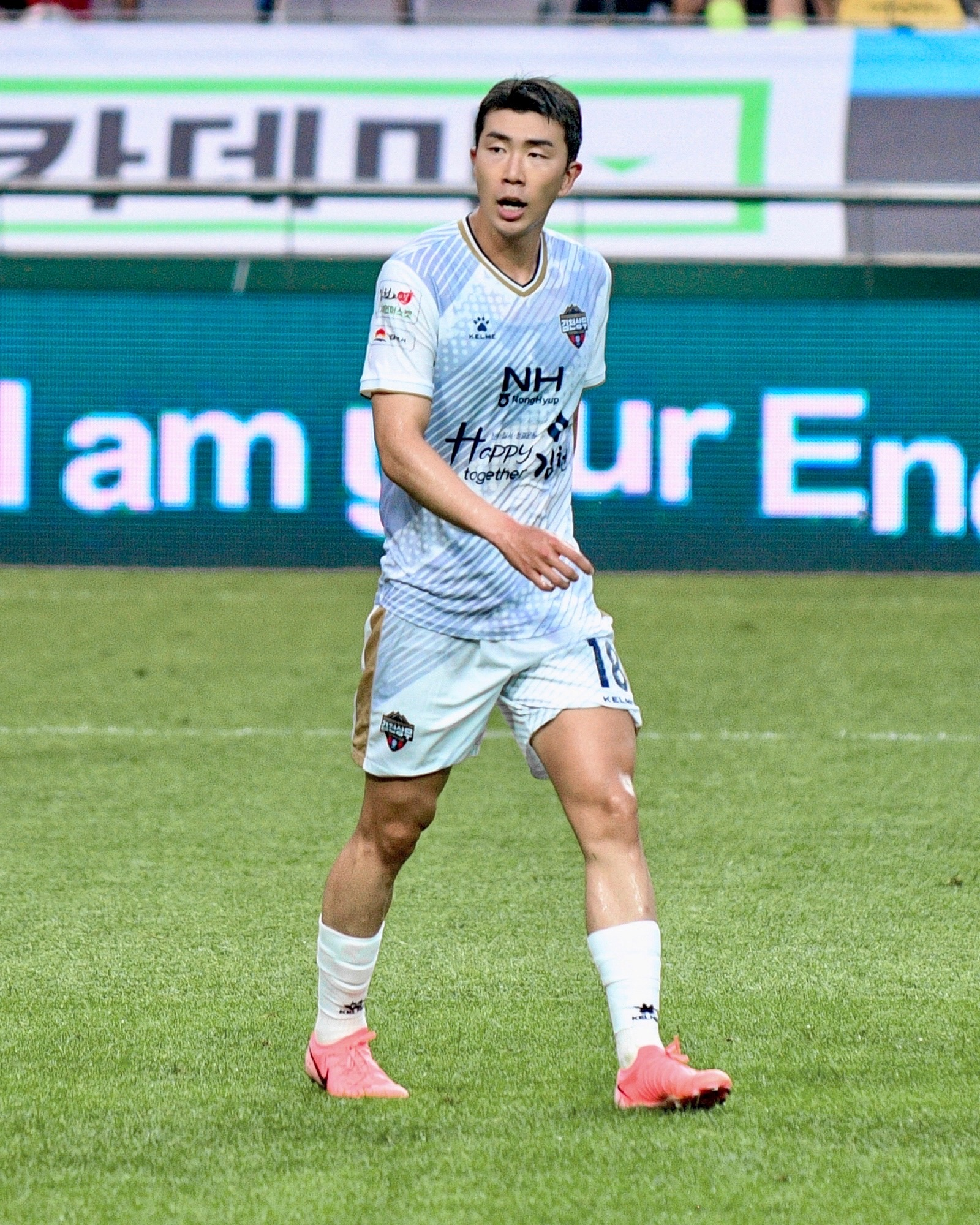
- Yu in 2024

Personal information
- Date of birth: 27 April 1996 (age 30)
- Place of birth: Gyeonggi, South Korea
- Height: 1.82 m (6 ft 0 in)
- Position: Forward

Team information
- Current team: Gimcheon Sangmu
- Number: 99

Youth career
- Seohae High School

Senior career*
Years	Team	Apps	(Gls)
2015–2016	Pohang Steelers		
2016	Daegu	0	(0)
2017–2018	Slovácko	1	(0)
2018–2019	Chuncheon		
2019–2021	Slovan Liberec	2	(0)
2020	→ Baník Sokolov (loan)	14	(2)
2020–2021	→ Chrudim (loan)	22	(3)
2021	Gyeongnam	5	(0)
2022	Chungnam Asan	40	(19)
2023–	Daejeon Hana Citizen	48	(4)
2024–2025	→ Gimcheon Sangmu (Army)	44	(10)
Korean name
Hangul	유강현
Hanja	柳康鉉
RR	Yu Ganghyeon
MR	Yu Kanghyŏn
- * Club domestic league appearances and goals as of 3 August 2026

Yu Kang-hyun (Korean: 유강현; born 27 April 1996) is a professional South Korean football forward currently playing for Daejeon Hana Citizen.

== Club career ==
He went on trial with Slovácko of the Czech First League in April 2017. He made his league debut for Slovácko on 27 May 2017 in their Czech First League 1–1 draw at Sparta Prague.
