= Hernandes Rodrigues =

Brazilian footballer (born 1999)

Personal information
- Full name: Hernandes Rodrigues da Silva
- Date of birth: 2 September 1999 (age 27)
- Place of birth: Porto Nacional, Brazil
- Height: 1.83 m (6 ft 0 in)
- Position: Forward

Team information
- Current team: The Cong-Viettel
- Number: 10

Youth career
- 2014–2016: Interporto
- 2017–2018: São Caetano

Senior career*
Years	Team	Apps	(Gls)
2018–2019	São Caetano	2	(0)
2019–2022	Grêmio	0	(0)
2020	→ Jeonnam Dragons (loan)	16	(3)
2021–2022	Gyeongnam	47	(18)
2022–2023	Incheon United	41	(10)
2024–2025	Jeonbuk Hyundai Motors	17	(2)
2025	Daejeon Hana Citizen	15	(4)
2026	Cuiabá	9	(2)
2026–	The Cong-Viettel	0	(0)
- * Club domestic league appearances and goals as of 16 April 2026

Hernandes Rodrigues da Silva, commonly known as Hernandes Rodrigues or simply Hernandes, is a Brazilian professional footballer who plays as a forward for V.League 1 club The Cong-Viettel.

== Club career ==
Born in Porto Nacional, Brazil, Hernandes joined the Grêmio's Academy at the age of 18 in 2019.

On 12 August 2026, Hernandes moved to Vietnam, signing for The Cong-Viettel.

== Career statistics ==
=== Club ===
As of match played 14 May 2025.

Appearances and goals by club, season and competition
Club	Season	League			National Cup		Continental		Other		Total	
Club	Season	Division	Apps	Goals	Apps	Goals	Apps	Goals	Apps	Goals	Apps	Goals
São Caetano	2018	State	—		—		—		16 (Note: Appearance(s) in Copa Paulista.)	1	16	1
São Caetano	2019	Série D	—		—		—		2 (Note: Appearance(s) in Campeonato Paulista.)	0	2	0
São Caetano	Total		—		—		—		18	1	18	1
Grêmio	2020	Série A	—		—		—		—		0	0
Grêmio	2021	Série A	—		—		—		—		0	0
Grêmio	Total		—		—		—		—		0	0
Jeonnam Dragons (loan)	2020	K League 2	16	3	—		—		—		16	3
Gyeongnam	2021	K League 2	27	10	2	1	—		—		29	11
Gyeongnam	2022	K League 2	20	8	1	0	—		—		21	8
Gyeongnam	Total		47	18	3	1	—		—		50	19
Incheon United	2022	K League 1	8	4	—		—		—		8	4
Incheon United	2023	K League 1	33	6	1	1	7	5	—		41	12
Incheon United	Total		41	10	1	1	7	5	—		49	16
Jeonbuk Hyundai Motors	2024	K League 1	14	2	0	0	1	1	0	0	15	3
Jeonbuk Hyundai Motors	2025	K League 1	3	0	1	0	—		—		4	0
Jeonbuk Hyundai Motors	Total		17	2	1	0	1	1	0	0	19	3
Career total			121	33	5	2	8	6	18	1	152	42

== Honours ==
Jeonbuk Hyundai Motors

- K League 1: 2025
- Korea Cup: 2025
