= Jang Jun-young =

South Korean footballer (born 1993)

Personal information
- Full name: Jang Jun-young
- Date of birth: 4 February 1993 (age 33)
- Place of birth: South Korea
- Height: 1.84 m (6 ft 1/2 in)
- Position: Defender

Team information
- Current team: Chungnam Asan
- Number: 5

Youth career
- 2012–2015: Yong In University

Senior career*
Years	Team	Apps	(Gls)
2016–2017	Daejeon Citizen	43	(1)
2018	Seongnam FC	0	(0)
2018	→ Gyeongju KH&NP (loan)	26	(3)
2019–2023	Suwon FC	46	(4)
2021–2022	→ FC Namdong (loan)	25	(4)
2022–2023	→ Seoul Nowon United FC (loan)	4	(0)
2023–	Chungnam Asan	57	(3)
- * Club domestic league appearances and goals as of 6 August 2026

Jang Jun-young (Korean: 장준영; born 4 February 1993) is a South Korean footballer who plays as defender for Chungnam Asan.

== Career ==
Jang joined K League Challenge side Daejeon Citizen in January 2016.
