= Choi Chi-won (footballer) =

South Korean footballer (born 1993)

Personal information
- Date of birth: 1 June 1993 (age 33)
- Place of birth: South Korea
- Position: Midfielder

Team information
- Current team: Chungnam Asan
- Number: 8

Senior career*
| Years | Team | Apps | (Gls) |
| 2015-2016 | Jeonbuk Hyundai Motors FC | 1 | (0) |
| 2015 | Seoul E-Land FC → (loan) | 8 | (1) |
| 2016-2018 | Seoul E-Land FC | 36 | (9) |
| 2019 | Gangwon FC | 8 | (1) |
| 2020 | Hwaseong FC | 18 | (9) |
| 2021 | Siheung Citizen | 13 | (2) |
| 2022 | Goyang Citizen | 24 | (7) |
| 2022 | Chungbuk Cheongju | 3 | (0) |
| 2023 | Daejeon Korail | 20 | (2) |
| 2024- | Chungnam Asan | 38 | (3) |
- * Club domestic league appearances and goals as of 6 August 2026

Choi Chi-won (Korean: 최치원; born 1 June 1993 in South Korea) is a South Korean footballer who plays for Chungnam Asan

== Career ==
On the final day of the 2015 K-League Challenge, Choi started against Gangwon with Seoul E-Land. In the 36th minute, he went up for a header with Han Seok-jong, but they collided, causing his skull to be fractured. After his recovery, Choi wore headgear to prevent injuries and provide psychological assistance. In 2017, he stopped wearing it to confront his fears.
