= Willyan (footballer) =

Brazilian footballer (born 1994)

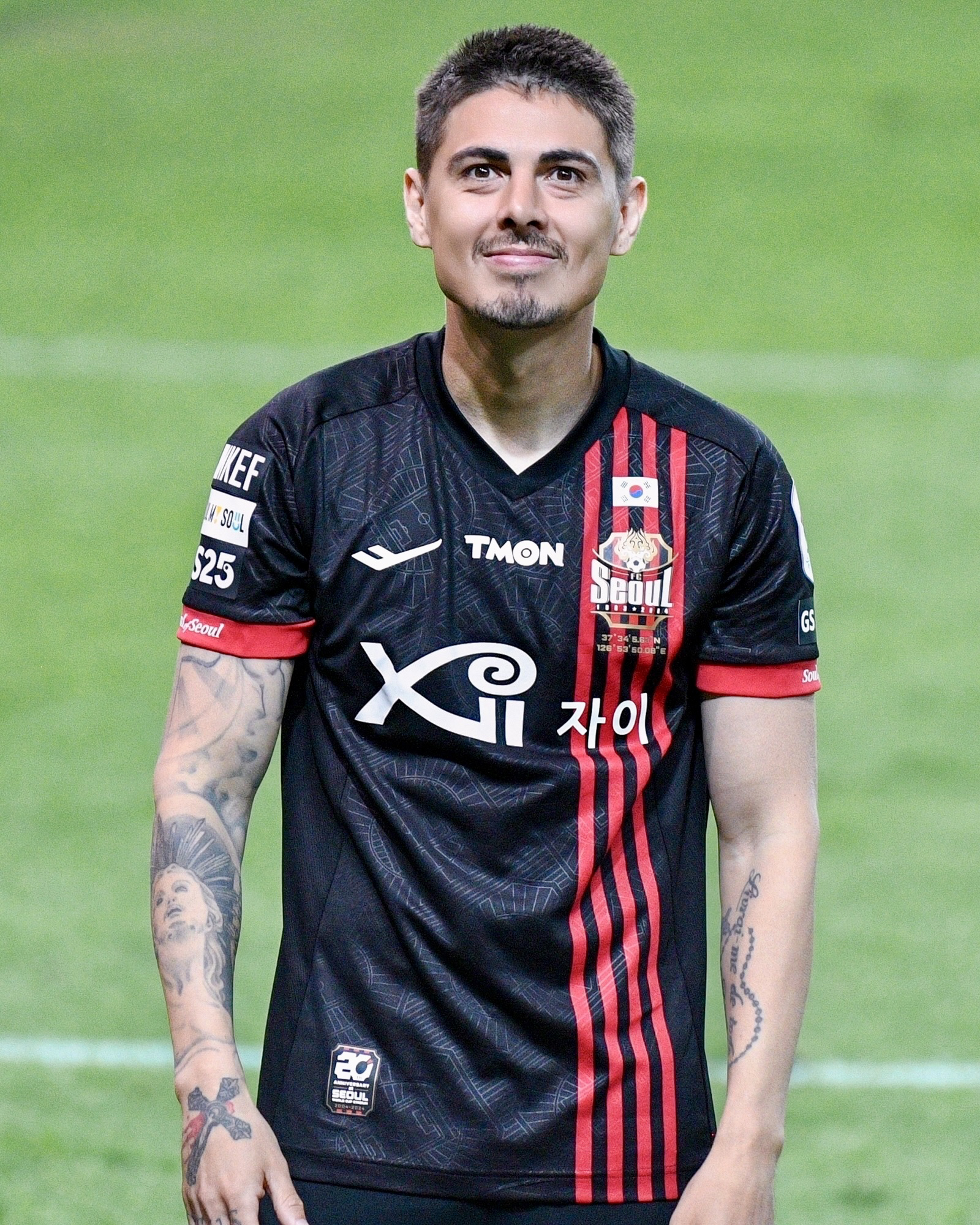
- Willyan in 2024

Personal information
- Full name: Willyan da Silva Barbosa
- Date of birth: 17 February 1994 (age 32)
- Place of birth: Bahia, Brazil
- Height: 1.69 m (5 ft 7 in)
- Position: Winger

Team information
- Current team: Suwon FC
- Number: 44

Youth career
- Bahia
- 2009–2010: Leme
- 2011–2013: Torino

Senior career*
Years	Team	Apps	(Gls)
2013–2014	Beira-Mar	30	(5)
2014–2017	Nacional	66	(6)
2017–2018	Vitória de Setúbal	14	(0)
2018–2019	Panetolikos	28	(4)
2019–2020	Gwangju FC	42	(13)
2021–2022	Gyeongnam FC	37	(16)
2022–2023	Daejeon Hana Citizen	17	(8)
2023	→ FC Seoul (loan)	33	(8)
2024–2025	FC Seoul	31	(5)
2025–	Suwon FC	22	(13)
- * Club domestic league appearances and goals as of 5 August 2026

Willyan da Silva Barbosa (born 17 February 1994) is a Brazilian footballer who plays for K League 1 club Suwon FC.

== Career ==
Willyan played youth football in homeland Brazil with Bahia and Leme.

In January 2011, he was signed by Italian Serie B club Torino, where he played for their youth team until 2013.

On 10 August 2013, Willyan was signed by Portuguese Segunda Liga club Beira-Mar in a temporary deal. He was signed permanently on 29 January 2014 on a three-and-a-half-year contract.

== Career statistics ==
As of match played 23 June 2024

Appearances and goals by club, season and competition
Club	Season	League			National cup		League Cup		Continental		Other		Total	
Club	Season	Division	Apps	Goals	Apps	Goals	Apps	Goals	Apps	Goals	Apps	Goals	Apps	Goals
Torino	2012–13	Serie A	0	0	—		—		—		—		0	0
Beira-Mar	2013–14	Liga Portugal 2	30	5	2	2	5	0	—		—		37	7
Nacional	2014–15	Primeira Liga	22	1	2	0	2	0	—		—		26	1
Nacional	2015–16	Primeira Liga	22	4	3	0	1	0	—		—		26	4
Nacional	2016–17	Primeira Liga	22	1	—		1	0	—		—		23	1
Nacional	Total		66	6	5	0	4	0	—		—		75	6
Vitória de Setúbal	2017–18	Primeira Liga	14	0	0	0	2	1	—		—		16	1
Panetolikos	2017–18	Super League Greece	6	1	—		—		—		—		6	1
Panetolikos	2018–19	Super League Greece	22	3	3	0	—		—		—		25	3
Panetolikos	Total		28	4	3	0	—		—		—		31	4
Gwangju FC	2019	K League 2	25	8	0	0	—		—		—		25	8
Gwangju FC	2020	K League 1	17	5	0	0	—		—		—		17	5
Gwangju FC	Total		42	13	0	0	—		—		—		42	13
Gyeongnam FC	2021	K League 2	27	11	1	0	—		—		—		28	11
Gyeongnam FC	2022	K League 2	10	5	0	0	—		—		—		10	5
Gyeongnam FC	Total		37	16	1	0	—		—		—		38	16
Daejeon Hana Citizen	2022	K League 2	17	8	0	0	—		—		—		17	8
FC Seoul (loan)	2023	K League 1	33	8	—		—		—		—		33	8
FC Seoul	2024	K League 1	14	5	0	0	—		—		—		0	0
FC Seoul	Total		33	8	0	0	—		—		—		33	8
Career Total			267	60	11	2	11	1	—		—		289	63
