= Park Se-jin =

South Korean footballer (born 1995)

Personal information
- Full name: Park Se-jin
- Date of birth: 15 December 1995 (age 30)
- Place of birth: South Korea
- Height: 1.76 m (5 ft 9 1/2 in)
- Position: Full back

Team information
- Current team: Chungnam Asan
- Number: 2

Youth career
- 2014–2015: Yeungnam University

Senior career*
| Years | Team | Apps | (Gls) |
| 2016–2017 | Daegu FC | 34 | (2) |
| 2018–2020 | Suwon FC | 21 | (1) |
| 2019–2020 | Sangju Sangmu | 19 | (0) |
| 2021 | Chungnam Asan | 33 | (0) |
| 2022–2024 | Busan IPark | 60 | (1) |
| 2025– | Chungnam Asan | 0 | (0) |

International career
| 2014 | South Korea U-20 | | |
- * Club domestic league appearances and goals as of 7 January 2026

Park Se-jin (Korean: 박세진; born 15 December 1995) is a South Korean footballer who plays as full back for Chungnam Asan in K League 2.

== Career ==
Park joined K League Challenge side Daegu FC in January 2016. He made his professional debut in the opening game of the 2016 season against Daejeon Citizen on 26 March.
