= Ahn Young-kyu =

South Korean footballer

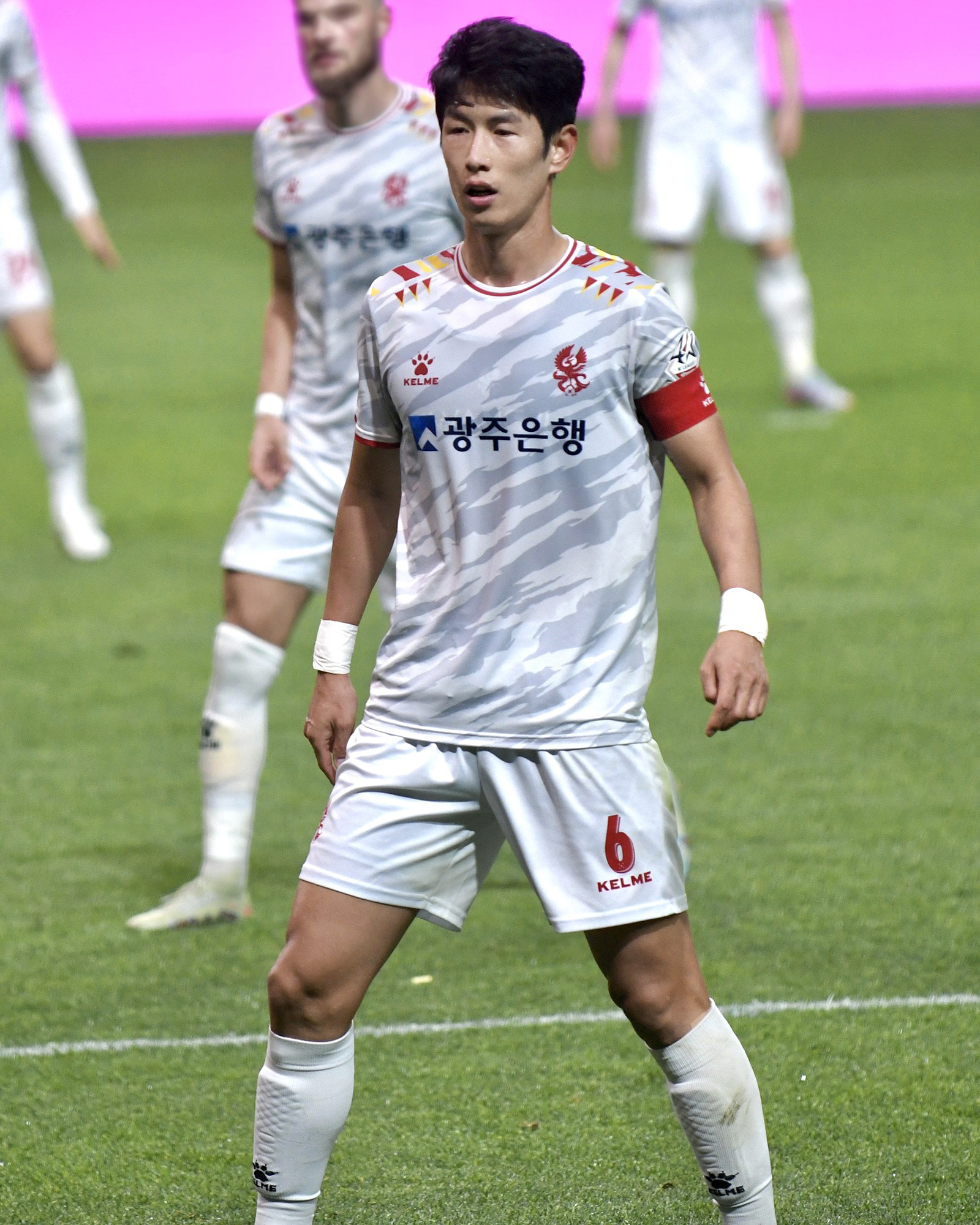
- Ahn in 2023

Personal information
- Date of birth: 4 December 1989 (age 36)
- Place of birth: South Korea
- Height: 1.83 m (6 ft 0 in)
- Position: Centre-back

Team information
- Current team: Gwangju FC
- Number: 6

College career
Years	Team	Apps	(Gls)
2008–2011	University of Ulsan		

Senior career*
Years	Team	Apps	(Gls)
2012–2013	Suwon Samsung Bluewings	0	(0)
2013	→ Giravanz Kitakyushu (loan)	14	(1)
2014	Daejeon Citizen	34	(2)
2015–2018	Gwangju FC	69	(3)
2016–2017	→ Asan Mugunghwa (draft)	28	(0)
2019–21	Seongnam FC	63	(0)
2022–	Gwangju FC	125	(3)

International career
2009	South Korea U20	1	(0)
2011	South Korea Universiade	5	(0)
- * Club domestic league appearances and goals as of 4 August 2026

Ahn Young-kyu (Korean: 안영규; born 4 December 1989) is a South Korean football player who plays as a centre-back for Gwangju FC. He is a three-time K League 2 champion, and was named the league's Most Valuable Player in 2022. He also represented South Korea at the 2011 Summer Universiade.

== Career statistics ==
As of match played 8 October 2023

Appearances and goals by club, season and competition
Club	Season	League			National cup		Other		Total	
Club	Season	Division	Apps	Goals	Apps	Goals	Apps	Goals	Apps	Goals
Giravanz Kitakyushu (loan)	2013	J2 League	14	1	1	0	—		15	1
Daejeon Citizen	2014	K League 2	34	2	0	0	—		34	2
Gwangju FC	2015	K League 1	33	2	1	0	—		34	2
Gwangju FC	2017	K League 1	1	0	0	0	—		1	0
Gwangju FC	2018	K League 2	35	1	0	0	1 (Note: Appearance in K League 2 promotion play-offs)	0	36	1
Gwangju FC	Total		69	3	1	0	1	0	71	3
Asan Mugunghwa (draft)	2016	K League 2	18	0	1	0	—		19	0
Asan Mugunghwa (draft)	2017	K League 2	10	0	3	0	—		13	0
Asan Mugunghwa (draft)	Total		28	0	4	0	0	0	32	0
Seongnam FC	2019	K League 1	29	0	0	0	—		29	0
Seongnam FC	2020	K League 1	13	0	2	0	—		15	0
Seongnam FC	2021	K League 1	21	0	0	0	—		21	0
Seongnam FC	Total		63	0	2	0	0	0	65	0
Gwangju FC	2022	K League 2	36	1	0	0	—		36	1
Gwangju FC	2023	K League 1	28	2	0	0	—		28	2
Gwangju FC	Total		64	3	0	0	0	0	64	3
Career total			272	9	8	0	1	0	281	9

== Honours ==
Daejeon Citizen

- K League 2: 2014

Ansan Mugunghwa

- K League 2: 2016

Gwangju FC

- K League 2: 2022

Individual

- K League 2 Most Valuable Player: 2022
- K League 2 Best XI: 2022
