= Kim Jin-young (footballer) =

South Korean footballer (born 1992)

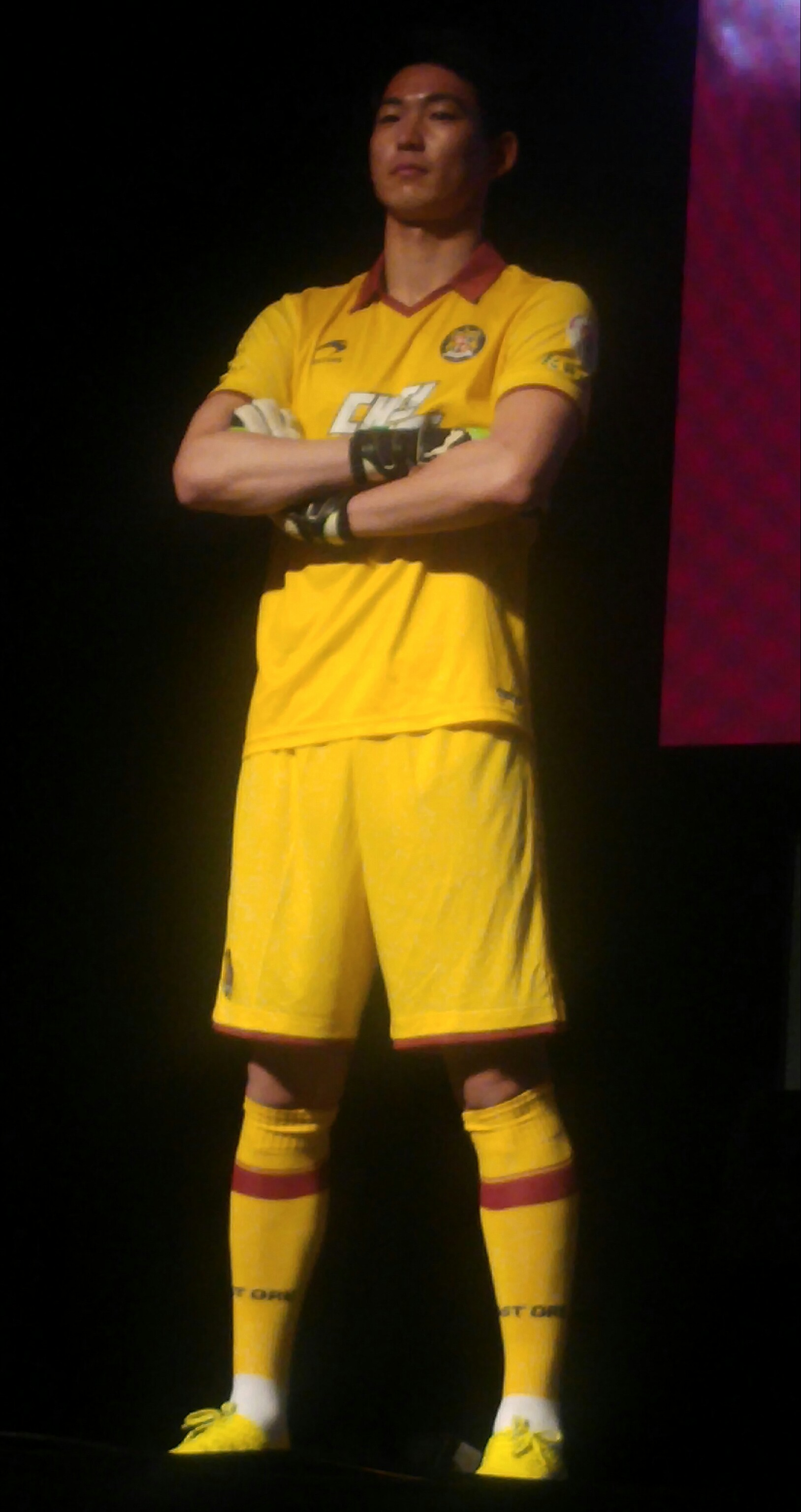
- Kim Jin-young at the Daejeon Citizens Ceremony

Personal information
- Full name: Kim Jin-young
- Date of birth: 2 March 1992 (age 34)
- Place of birth: Gwangyang, Jeollanam-do, South Korea
- Height: 1.95 m (6 ft 5 in)
- Position: Goalkeeper

Team information
- Current team: Chungnam Asan
- Number: 21

Youth career
- 2011–2013: Konkuk University

Senior career*
Years	Team	Apps	(Gls)
2014–2017	Pohang Steelers	19	(0)
2018-2020	Daejeon Citizen	33	(0)
2021	Gimpo Citizen FC	8	(0)
2022–2024	Hwaseong FC	62	(0)
2025–	Chungnam Asan	3	(0)

International career
2007–2009	South Korea U-17		
2010–2011	South Korea U-20		
- * Club domestic league appearances and goals as of 7 January 2026

Kim Jin-young (Korean: 김진영; born 2 March 1992) is a South Korean footballer who plays as goalkeeper for Chungnam Asan in K League 2.

== Career ==
He was selected by Pohang Steelers in the 2014 K League draft.
