= Gyeongnam FC =

South Korean association football club

Gyeongnam
- Full name: Gyeongnam Football Club 경남 도민프로축구단
- Founded: 2006; 20 years ago
- Ground: Changwon Football Center
- Capacity: 15,071
- Owner: South Gyeongsang Province Government
- Chairman: Governor of South Gyeongsang Province
- Manager: Bae Sung-jae
- League: K League 2
- 2025: K League 2, 11th of 14
- Website: gyeongnamfc.com
Home colours	Away colours

Gyeongnam FC (경남 FC) is a South Korean professional football club based in South Gyeongsang Province that competes in the K League 2, the second tier of the South Korean football league system. Its home stadium is the Changwon Football Center, located in Changwon. Gyeongnam FC was founded in 2006 and joined the K League as its 14th club for the 2006 season.

== History ==
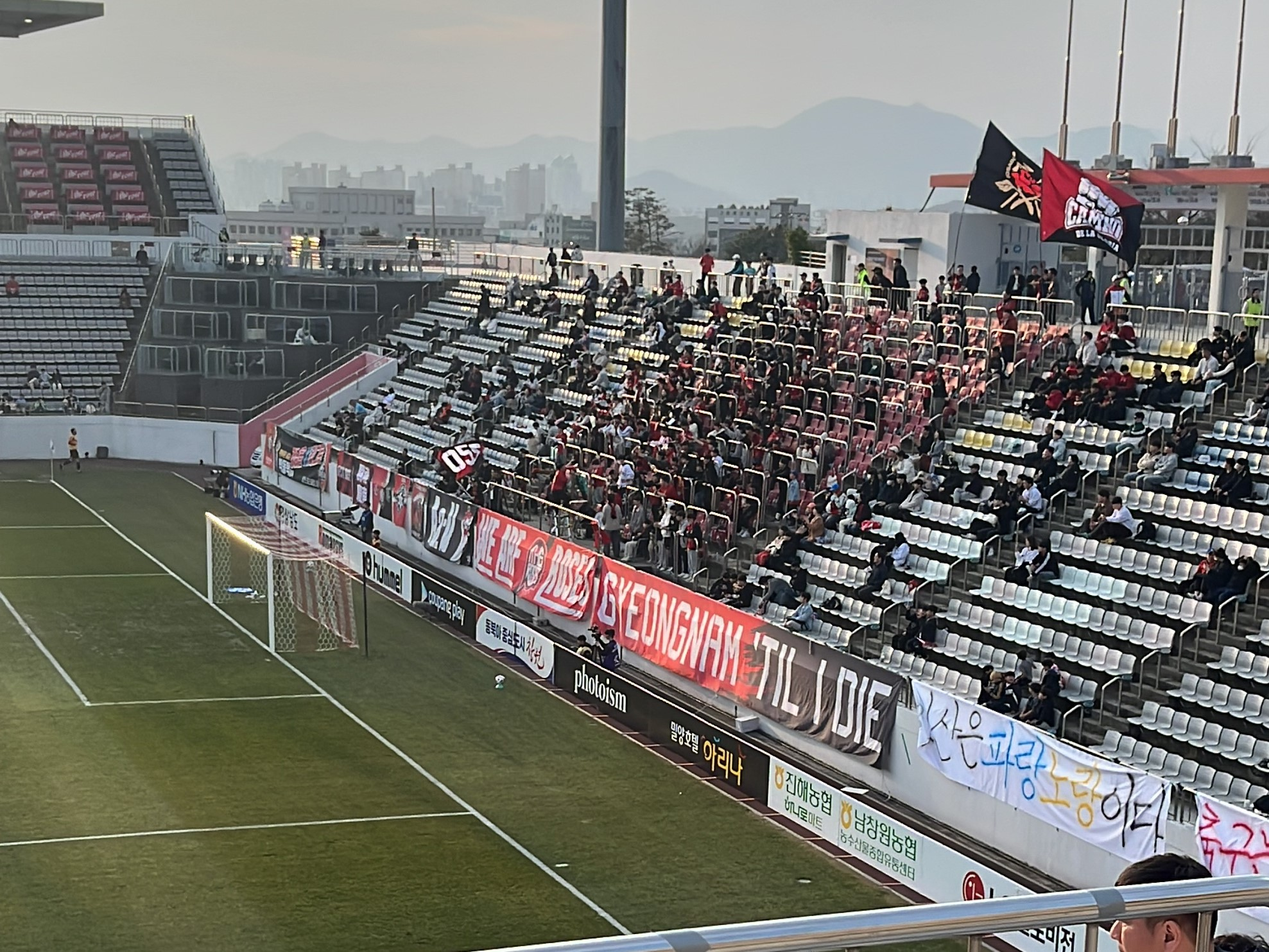
Gyeongnam FC fans support their team during a home match against Chungnam Asan

Gyeongnam FC finished in twelfth place in the 2006 K League, their first-ever participation in the top flight, and achieved third place in the Hauzen Cup. Under the manager Park Hang-seo, the club then finished fourth in the 2007 K League, but were defeated by the Pohang Steelers after a penalty shoot-out in the first round of the play-offs. Cabore became that season's K League top scorer with 18 goals in 26 matches, but left for FC Tokyo after the season.

Before the start of the 2008 season, Cho Kwang-rae was appointed as manager. The team signed Seo Sang-min and Brazilian attacking midfielder Índio, who filled the gap left by Cabore. The team failed to reach the play-off by losing to Jeonbuk Motors in the last match of the 2008 K League. However, they reached the 2008 Korean FA Cup final thanks to Kim Dong-chan's continuous scoring, including a hat-trick in the semi-final, but were defeated by the Pohang Steelers, thus failing to enter the AFC Champions League. In 2010, Gyeongnam FC moved from the Changwon Civil Stadium to Changwon Football Center.

In 2014, Gyeongnam FC was relegated to the second-tier K League Challenge after finishing the 2014 season in eleventh place, and then losing in the relegation play-offs against Gwangju FC. The team then spent three seasons in the second division, before winning the 2017 K League Challenge and thus achieving promotion back to the top tier. In their first season after coming back, Gyeongnam FC finished in second place, their highest-ever finish in K League, and therefore qualified for the 2019 AFC Champions League. However, the following season, they finished eleventh and were again relegated to the second division. Manager Kim Jong-boo resigned as a result, and was replaced by Seol Ki-hyeon.

== Players ==
=== Current squad ===
As of 18 November 2026

Note: Flags indicate national team as defined under FIFA eligibility rules; some limited exceptions apply. Players may hold more than one non-FIFA nationality.

No.	Pos.	Nation	Player
1	GK	KOR	Sin Jun-seo
2	DF	KOR	Bae Hyun-seo (on loan from FC Seoul)
3	DF	KOR	Cho Woo-young
4	DF	KOR	Lee Chan-ouk
5	DF	KOR	Choi Sung-hoon
6	MF	KOR	Im Eun-su
8	MF	KOR	Lee Chan-dong (vice-captain)
9	FW	KOR	Kim Su-min
10	FW	NGR	Chigozie Mbah
13	GK	KOR	Lee Ki-hyun
14	DF	KOR	Jeon Min-su
15	GK	KOR	An Ho-jin
16	MF	KOR	Lim Hyun-sub
17	DF	KOR	Kim Gyu-min
18	DF	KOR	Kim Sun-ho
20	DF	KOR	Lee Gyu-baek
21	FW	KOR	Cho Jin-hyuk
22	MF	KOR	Kim Hyeong-won
23	FW	KOR	Kwon Gi-pyo (vice-captain)

No.	Pos.	Nation	Player
24	FW	KOR	Yun Il-lok
25	GK	KOR	Lee Bum-soo
26	MF	KOR	Choi Jung-won (captain)
27	DF	KOR	Son Ho-jun
28	MF	KOR	Kim Jun-ho
29	DF	MNE	Aleksa Karadzić
30	DF	KOR	Jeong Hyun-wook
31	GK	KOR	Kim Tae-hoon (on loan from FC Anyang)
33	DF	KOR	Kim Yeon-su
39	DF	BRA	Lucão
42	MF	KOR	Song Hong-min
44	MF	KOR	Kim Jeong-hyun
55	DF	KOR	Jang Seung-woo
66	FW	KOR	Cho Sang-jun
70	FW	BRA	Felipe Fonseca
71	FW	KOR	Lee Heon-jae
77	MF	KOR	Kim Ha-min
90	FW	KOR	Kim Hyeon-oh (on loan from Daejeon Hana Citizen)
99	FW	KOR	Lee Jung-min

=== Out on loan ===
Note: Flags indicate national team as defined under FIFA eligibility rules; some limited exceptions apply. Players may hold more than one non-FIFA nationality.

No.	Pos.	Nation	Player
—	DF	KOR	Cheon Jung-wook (at Haman FC)
—	DF	KOR	Choi Seong-jin (at FC Gangneung)
—	DF	KOR	Lee Ju-yeong (at FC Gangneung)
—	MF	KOR	Choi Min-seo (at Jinju Citizen for military service)

No.	Pos.	Nation	Player
—	MF	KOR	Park Han-bin (at Geoje Citizen for military service)
—	FW	KOR	Park Min-seo (at Jincheon HR for military service)
—	FW	KOR	Seol Hyeon-jin (at Gimhae FC 2008)

=== Captains ===
Name	Start	End
(South Korea) Kim Do-keun	2006	2006
(South Korea) Kim Hyo-il	2007	2008
(South Korea) Lee Sang-hong	2008	2009
(South Korea) Kim Young-woo	2010	2011
(South Korea) Jung Da-hwon	2011	2011
(South Korea) Kang Seung-jo	2012	2013
(South Korea) Kim Hyeung-bum	2013	2013
(South Korea) Lee Han-saem	2014	2014
(South Korea) Park Ju-sung	2014	2014
(South Korea) Jin Kyung-sun	2015	2015
(South Korea) Lee Won-jae	2016	2016
(South Korea) Bae Ki-jong	2017	2019
(South Korea) Ha Sung-min	2020	2020
(South Korea) Hwang Il-su	2021	2021
(Brazil) Willyan	2022	2022
(South Korea) Lee Kwang-jin	2022	2022
(South Korea) Woo Joo-sung	2023	2024
(South Korea) Han Yong-soo	2024	2024
(South Korea) Park Won-jae	2025	2025
(South Korea) Won Ki-jong	2026	

=== Former players ===
For details on former players, see Category:Gyeongnam FC players.

== Coaching staff ==
Position	Name
Manager	(South Korea) Bae Sung-jae
Assistant manager	(South Korea) Kim Pil-jong
First-team coach	(Brazil) Issac Arques Soriano
First-team coach	(South Korea) Park Jong-jin
Goalkeeping coach	(South Korea) Back Min-chul
Fitness coach	(South Korea) Choi Joon-hyuk

== Honours ==
- K League 1
  - Runners-up (1): 2018
- K League 2
  - Winners (1): 2017
- Korean FA Cup
  - Runners-up (2): 2008, 2012

== Season-by-season records ==
Season	Division	Teams	Position	FA Cup
2006	K League	14	12	Quarter-final
2007	K League	14	4	Round of 16
2008	K League	14	8	Runners-up
2009	K League	15	7	Round of 16
2010	K League	15	6	Round of 16
2011	K League	16	8	Round of 32
2012	K League	16	8	Runners-up
2013	K League Classic	14	11	Quarter-final
2014	K League Classic	12	11	Round of 32
2015	K League Challenge	11	9	Third round
2016	K League Challenge	11	8	Third round
2017	K League Challenge	10	1	Round of 16
2018	K League 1	12	2	Round of 32
2019	K League 1	12	11	Quarter-final
2020	K League 2	10	3	Third round
2021	K League 2	10	6	Round of 16
2022	K League 2	11	5	Round of 16
2023	K League 2	13	4	Round of 16
2024	K League 2	13	12	Round of 16
2025	K League 2	14	11	Second round

=== AFC Champions League record ===
All results (home and away) list Gyeongnam's goal tally first.

Season	Competition	Round	Opposition	Home	Away	Position
2019	AFC Champions League	Group E	(China) Shandong Luneng	2–2	1–2	3rd
2019	AFC Champions League	Group E	(Malaysia) Johor Darul Ta'zim	2–0	1–1	3rd
2019	AFC Champions League	Group E	(Japan) Kashima Antlers	2–3	1–0	3rd

== Managerial history ==
No.	Name	From	To	Season(s)	Notes
1	(South Korea) Park Hang-seo	2005/08/22	2007/11/16	2006–2007	
2	(South Korea) Cho Kwang-rae	2007/12/04	2010/07/31	2008–2010	
C	(South Korea) Kim Gwi-hwa	2010/08/09	2010/11/29	2010	Caretaker
3	(South Korea) Choi Jin-han	2010/12/01	2013/05/22	2011–2013	
C	(South Korea) Song Kwang-hwan	2013/05/22	2013/06/01	2013	Caretaker
4	(Serbia) Ilija Petković	2013/05/29	2013/12/11	2013	
5	(South Korea) Lee Cha-man	2013/12/17	2014/08/14	2014	
C	(Serbia) Branko Babić	2014/08/14	2014/12/26	2014	Caretaker
6	(South Korea) Park Sung-hwa	2014/12/26	2015/11/22	2015	
7	(South Korea) Kim Jong-boo	2015/12/02	2019/12/25	2016–2019	
8	(South Korea) Seol Ki-hyeon	2019/12/26	2023/12/05	2020–2023	
9	(South Korea) Park Dong-hyuk	2023/12/05	2024/09/13	2023–2024	
C	(South Korea) Kwon Woo-kyung	2024/09/13	2024/11/18	2024	Caretaker
10	(South Korea) Lee Eul-yong	2024/11/19	2025/09/06	2025	
C	(South Korea) Kim Pil-jong	2025/09/06	2025/12/08	2025	Caretaker
11	(South Korea) Bae Sung-jae	2025/12/08		2026–	
