= Lee Euddeum =

South Korean footballer

Personal information
- Full name: Lee Euddeum
- Date of birth: 2 September 1989 (age 37)
- Place of birth: South Korea
- Height: 1.78 m (5 ft 10 in)
- Position: Full-back

Team information
- Current team: Gwangju FC
- Number: 8

Youth career
- 2009–2012: Yongin University

Senior career*
Years	Team	Apps	(Gls)
2013–2014	FC Anyang	41	(1)
2015–	Gwangju FC	164	(7)
2017–2018	→ Asan Mugunghwa (army)	12	(0)
- * Club domestic league appearances and goals as of 12 January 2021

Lee Euddeum (Korean: 이으뜸; born 2 September 1989) is a South Korean footballer who plays as defender for Gwangju FC in K League 1.

== Career ==
He was selected by FC Anyang in the 2013 K League draft.
