= Reis (footballer, born 1993) =

Brazilian footballer

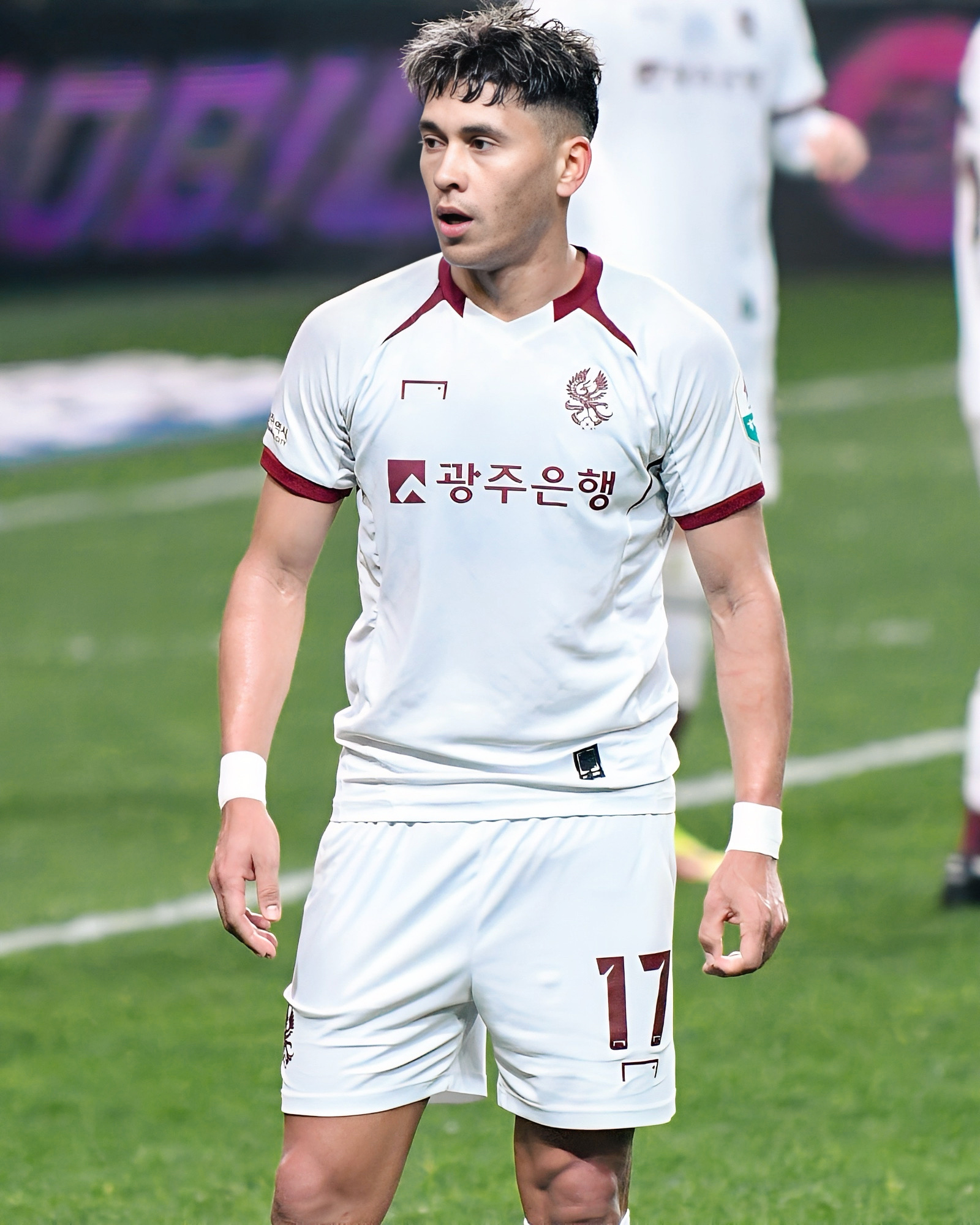
- Reis in 2025

Personal information
- Full name: Isnairo Reis Silva Morais
- Date of birth: 6 January 1993 (age 33)
- Place of birth: Capitão Poço, Brazil
- Height: 1.74 m (5 ft 8 1/2 in)
- Position: Midfielder

Team information
- Current team: Suwon Samsung Bluewings
- Number: 10

Senior career*
Years	Team	Apps	(Gls)
2012	Remo	9	(2)
2012	Atlético Goianiense	2	(0)
2014	Internacional	3	(0)
2014	Remo	9	(1)
2015–2016	América de Natal	29	(2)
2017	Caxias	14	(1)
2017	Boa	34	(2)
2018	Vila Nova	32	(3)
2019	Criciúma	42	(3)
2019–2021	Confiança	55	(17)
2021–2022	Gwangju FC	69	(16)
2023–2025	Jeju United	64	(12)
2025	Gwangju FC	37	(10)
2026–	Suwon Samsung Bluewings	19	(6)
- * Club domestic league appearances and goals as of 5 August 2026

Isnairo Reis Silva Morais (born 6 January 1993), simply known as Reis, is a Brazilian professional footballer who plays as a midfielder for Suwon Samsung Bluewings.

== Career statistics ==
As of match played 5 August 2026.

Appearances and goals by club, season and competition
Club	Season	League			State League		Cup		Continental		Other		Total	
Club	Season	Division	Apps	Goals	Apps	Goals	Apps	Goals	Apps	Goals	Apps	Goals	Apps	Goals
Remo	2012	Série D	9	2	0	0	4	1	—		—		13	3
Atlético Goianiense	2012	Série A	2	0	—		—		—		—		2	0
Internacional	2014	Série A	—		3	0	0	0	—		—		3	0
Remo	2014	Série D	9	1	—		0	0	—		—		9	1
América de Natal	2015	Série C	6	0	—		2	1	—		—		8	1
América de Natal	2016	Série C	12	0	9	1	2	0	—		2	1	25	2
América de Natal	Total		18	0	9	1	4	1	—		2	1	33	3
Caxias	2017		—		14	1	—		—		—		14	1
Boa	2017	Série B	34	2	–		0	0	—		—		34	2
Vila Nova	2018	Série B	20	2	12	1	4	0	—		—		36	3
Criciúma	2019	Série B	23	1	19	2	4	0	—		—		46	3
Confiança	2020	Série B	34	10	11	5	0	0	—		10	2	55	17
Gwangju FC	2021	K League 1	30	4	—		0	0	—		—		30	4
Gwangju FC	2022	K League 2	39	12	—		0	0	—		—		39	12
Gwangju FC	Total		69	16	—		0	0	—		—		69	16
Jeju United	2023	K League 1	36	8	—		2	0	—		—		38	8
Jeju United	2024	K League 1	28	4	—		3	2	—		—		31	6
Jeju United	Total		64	12	—		5	2	—		—		69	14
Gwangju FC	2025	K League 1	37	10	—		4	0	5	1	—		46	11
Suwon Samsung Bluewings	2026	K League 2	19	6	—		0	0	0	0	—		19	9
Career total			338	62	68	10	25	4	5	1	12	3	448	80

== Honours ==
Confiança

- Campeonato Sergipano: 2020
