= Ha Nam (footballer) =

South Korean footballer (born 1998)

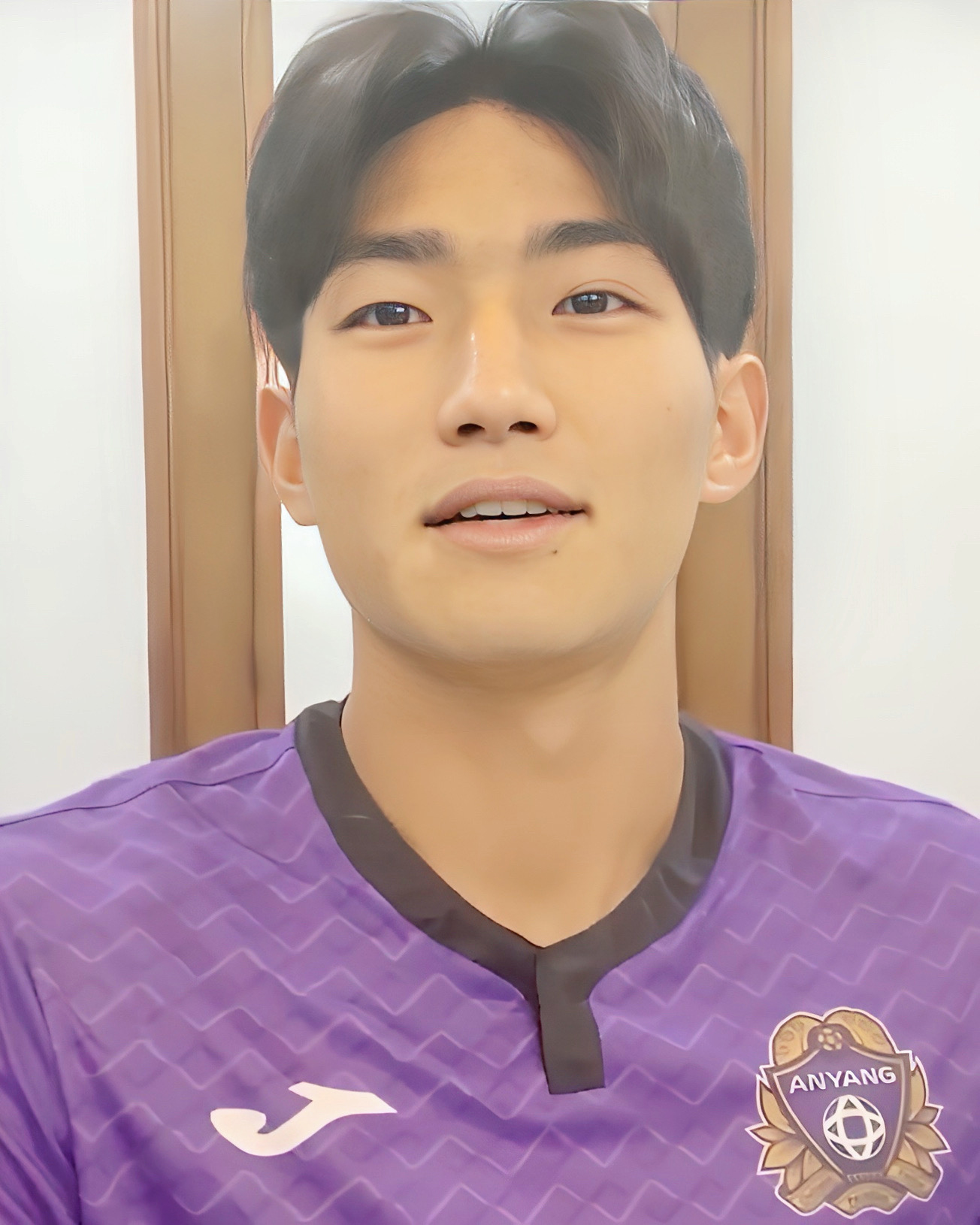
- Ha with FC Anyang in 2020

Personal information
- Date of birth: 7 December 1998 (age 27)
- Place of birth: South Korea
- Height: 1.85 m (6 ft 1 in)
- Position: Forward

Team information
- Current team: Jeonnam Dragons
- Number: 9

Youth career
- 2011–2013: Dongnae Middle School
- 2014–2016: Ganggyeong Commercial HS
- 2017–2019: Nambu University

Senior career*
Years	Team	Apps	(Gls)
2020–2021	FC Anyang	18	(3)
2022–2023	Gyeongnam FC	19	(2)
2023–	Jeonnam Dragons	99	(28)
- * Club domestic league appearances and goals as of 8 August 2026

- Ha Nam
- Hangul: 하남
- RR: Ha Nam
- MR: Ha Nam

Ha Nam (Korean: 하남; born 7 December 1998) is a South Korean footballer currently playing as a forward for Jeonnam Dragons.

== Career statistics ==
=== Club ===
As of 16 February 2022.

Club	Season	League			FA Cup		Other		Total	
Club	Season	Division	Apps	Goals	Apps	Goals	Apps	Goals	Apps	Goals
FC Anyang	2020	K League 2	2	0	1	0	0	0	3	0
FC Anyang	2021	K League 2	16	3	2	0	0	0	18	3
Gyeongnam FC	2022	K League 2	0	0	0	0	0	0	0	0
Career total			18	3	3	0	0	0	21	3
