= Kwon Gi-pyo =

South Korean footballer (born 1997)

Personal information
- Date of birth: 26 June 1997 (age 29)
- Place of birth: Daegu, South Korea
- Height: 1.75 m (5 ft 9 in)
- Position: Defender

Team information
- Current team: Gyeongnam FC
- Number: 23

Youth career
- 2010–2015: Pohang Steelers
- 2016–2017: Konkuk University

Senior career*
Years	Team	Apps	(Gls)
2018–2022	Pohang Steelers	15	(0)
2019	→ Seoul E-Land (loan)	21	(3)
2020	→ FC Anyang (loan)	10	(0)
2023–	Gyeongnam FC	29	(1)
2024–2025	→ Jinju Citizen (loan)	34	(5)

International career^{‡}
2015	South Korea U18	2	(0)
- * Club domestic league appearances and goals as of 6 August 2026 ‡ National team caps and goals as of 14:18, 29 June 2021 (UTC)

- Kwon Gi-pyo
- Hangul: 권기표
- RR: Gwon Gipyo
- MR: Kwŏn Kip'yo

Kwon Gi-pyo (Korean: 권기표; born 26 June 1997) is a South Korean footballer currently playing as a right-back for Gyeongnam FC.

== Career statistics ==
=== Club ===
As of 29 June 2021.

Club	Season	League			Cup		Continental		Other		Total	
Club	Season	Division	Apps	Goals	Apps	Goals	Apps	Goals	Apps	Goals	Apps	Goals
Pohang Steelers	2018	K League 1	2	0	1	0	0	0	0	0	3	0
Pohang Steelers	2019	K League 1	0	0	0	0	0	0	0	0	0	0
Pohang Steelers	2020	K League 1	0	0	0	0	0	0	0	0	0	0
Pohang Steelers	2021	K League 1	0	0	0	0	3 (Note: Appearances in the AFC Champions League)	1	0	0	3	1
Pohang Steelers	Total		2	0	1	0	3	1	0	0	6	1
Seoul E-Land (loan)	2019	K League 2	21	3	1	0	–		0	0	22	3
FC Anyang (loan)	2020	K League 2	10	0	2	0	–		0	0	12	0
Career total			33	3	4	0	3	1	0	0	40	4
