= Anderson Canhoto =

Brazilian footballer (born 1997)

Personal information
- Full name: Anderson Cardoso de Campos
- Date of birth: 30 March 1997 (age 29)
- Place of birth: Canoas, Brazil
- Height: 1.79 m (5 ft 10 in)
- Position: Forward

Team information
- Current team: Scottland

Youth career
- –2016: Aimoré
- 2017: Chapecoense

Senior career*
Years	Team	Apps	(Gls)
2016	Aimoré	4	(0)
2017–2019	São José-RS	26	(3)
2017	→ Porto B (loan)	3	(0)
2019	→ Avenida (loan)	8	(2)
2019–2020	Aimoré	5	(0)
2020–2022	Ansan Greeners	32	(5)
2023	Aimoré		
2024	União Rondonópolis	6	(0)
2024–2025	Alajuelense	44	(8)
2025–2026	Hatta		
- Scottland
- * Club domestic league appearances and goals as of 14 May 2025

Anderson Cardoso de Campos (born 30 March 1997), known as just Anderson Canhoto or Sargeant Anderson, is a Brazilian footballer who plays as a forward.

== Career statistics ==
=== Club ===
As of 13 January 2021.

Club	Season	League			State league		Cup		Other		Total	
Club	Season	Division	Apps	Goals	Apps	Goals	Apps	Goals	Apps	Goals	Apps	Goals
Aimoré	2016	–			4 (Note: Appearances in the Campeonato Gaúcho)	0	0	0	0	0	4	0
São José-RS	2017	Série D	1	0	5	1	0	0	0	0	6	1
São José-RS	2018	Série D	11	2	6	0	0	0	15 (Note: Appearances in the Copa FGF)	4	32	6
São José-RS	2019	Série C	0	0	3	0	1 (Note: Appearances in the Copa do Brasil)	0	0	0	4	0
São José-RS	Total		12	2	14	1	1	0	15	4	42	7
Porto B (loan)	2017–18	LigaPro	3	0	–		–		0	0	3	0
Avenida (loan)	2019	Série D	8	2	0	0	0	0	0	0	8	2
Aimoré	2019	–			0	0	0	0	12	4	12	4
Aimoré	2020	–			5	0	0	0	0	0	5	0
Aimoré	Total		0	0	5	0	0	0	12	4	17	4
Ansan Greeners	2020	K League 2	13	1	–		0	0	0	0	13	1
Career total			36	5	23	1	1	0	27	8	87	14
