= Yi Sun-sin Stadium =

Stadium in Asan, South Korea

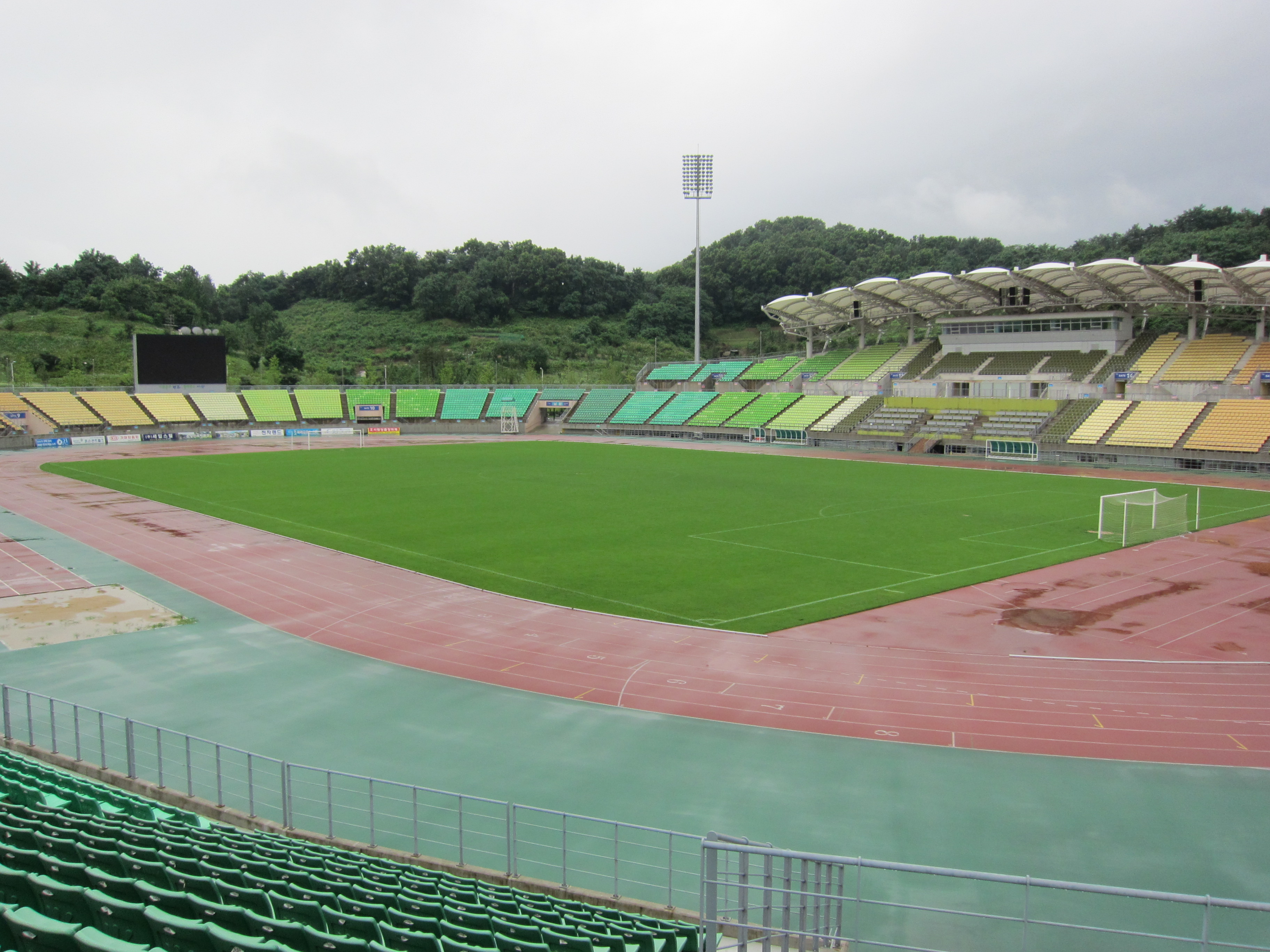
- Interactive map of Yi Sun-sin Stadium
- Location: 366-2, Punggi-dong, Asan, South Chungcheong Province, South Korea
- Coordinates: 36.768172°N 127.021685°E
- Owner: Asan City Hall
- Capacity: 17,376
- Surface: Natural lawn

Construction
- Groundbreaking: 17 February 2006
- Opened: 10 April 2008
- Cost: 44.5 billion won

Tenants
- Asan United FC (2008–2013); Asan Mugunghwa FC (2017–2019); Chungnam Asan FC (2020–present)

Yi Sun-sin Stadium (Korean: 이순신종합운동장) is a multi-purpose stadium in Asan, South Chungcheong Province, South Korea. It has a seating capacity for 17,376 spectators.
