= Park Han-bin =

South Korean footballer

Personal information
- Full name: Park Han-bin
- Date of birth: 21 September 1997 (age 29)
- Place of birth: South Korea
- Height: 1.82 m (6 ft 0 in)
- Position: Midfielder

Team information
- Current team: Gwangju FC
- Number: 33

Youth career
- –2015: Shingal High School

Senior career*
| Years | Team | Apps | (Gls) |
| 2016–2021 | Daegu FC | 86 | (4) |
| 2020 | → Slovan Liberec (loan) | 0 | (0) |
| 2022– | Gwangju FC | 51 | (4) |

International career^{‡}
| 2015– | South Korea U-20 | 20 | (0) |
- * Club domestic league appearances and goals as of 7 January 2021 ‡ National team caps and goals as of 25 January 2017

- Park Han-bin
- Hangul: 박한빈
- Hanja: 朴限彬
- RR: Bak Hanbin
- MR: Pak Hanbin

Park Han-bin (Korean: 박한빈; Hanja: 朴限彬; born 21 September 1997) is a South Korean football midfielder who plays for Gwangju FC.

== Club career ==
Park joined Daegu FC in 2016 and made his league debut against FC Anyang on 25 May 2016.

== International career ==
He has been a member of the South Korea national U-20 team since 2015.

== Club career statistics ==
As of 7 December 2019

| Club performance | | | League | | Cup | | continental | | Total | |
| Season | Club | League | Apps | Goals | Apps | Goals | Apps | Goals | Apps | Goals |
| South Korea | | | League | | KFA Cup | | Asia | | Total | |
|---|---|---|---|---|---|---|---|---|---|---|
| 2016 | Daegu FC | K League 2 | 6 | 0 | 0 | 0 | - | | 6 | 0 |
| 2017 | Daegu FC | K League 1 | 17 | 0 | 0 | 0 | - | | 17 | 0 |
| 2018 | Daegu FC | K League 1 | 24 | 3 | 5 | 3 | - | | 29 | 6 |
| 2019 | Daegu FC | K League 1 | 15 | 0 | 1 | 0 | 2 | 0 | 18 | 0 |
| Total | South Korea | | 62 | 3 | 6 | 3 | 2 | 0 | 70 | 6 |
| Career total | | | 62 | 3 | 6 | 3 | 2 | 0 | 70 | 6 |
