= Gimpo Solteo Football Field =

Football stadium in South Korea

- Interactive map of Gimpo Solteo Football Field
- Location: Gimpo, South Korea
- Coordinates: 37°38′27″N 126°38′59″E
- Owner: Gimpo City Hall
- Operator: Gimpo FC
- Capacity: 10,037
- Surface: Natural grass

Construction
- Opened: 2015

Tenant
- Gimpo FC (2021–present)

Gimpo Solteo Football Field (Korean: 김포솔터축구장) is a football-specific stadium in Gimpo, South Korea. The stadium has a capacity for 10,037 spectators and is the home ground of K League 2 team Gimpo FC.
