= Chungnam Asan FC =

- Full name: Chungnam Asan Football Club
- Founded: 2020; 6 years ago
- Ground: Yi Sun-sin Stadium
- Capacity: 19,283
- Owner(s): Asan and South Chungcheong Province Government
- Chairman: Oh Se-hyun (Mayor of Asan)
- Manager: André
- League: K League 2
- 2025: K League 2, 9th of 14
- Website: www.asanfc.com
Home colours	Away colours

Chungnam Asan FC (Korean: 충남 아산 FC) is a South Korean football club based in Asan that competes in the K League 2, the second tier of the South Korean football league system. They play their home games at Yi Sun-sin Stadium.

== History ==
In November 2019, it was announced that Asan Mugunghwa, the police football club in which the South Korean footballers served their two-year military duty, would be transformed into a civil football club, where non-South Korean foreign footballers would also be able to play. The club's new name, Chungnam Asan FC, along with a new crest, was officially revealed on 27 December 2019.

== Squad ==
=== Current squad ===
As of 5 November 2026

Note: Flags indicate national team as defined under FIFA eligibility rules; some limited exceptions apply. Players may hold more than one non-FIFA nationality.

No.	Pos.	Nation	Player
1	GK	KOR	Park Han-geun
3	DF	KOR	Lee Ho-in
4	DF	KOR	Hwang Ki-wook
5	DF	KOR	Byun Jun-young
6	DF	KOR	Choi Hee-won
7	FW	KOR	Han Kyo-won
8	MF	KOR	Choi Chi-won
9	FW	KOR	Kim Jong-min
10	MF	KOR	Son Jun-ho
11	FW	BRA	Denisson Silva
13	DF	KOR	Kim Young-nam
14	DF	KOR	Park Seong-woo
15	DF	KOR	Yang Seung-wook
17	DF	KOR	Kim Joo-sung
18	GK	KOR	Shin Song-hoon (vice-captain)
19	DF	KOR	Park Se-jin
20	DF	KOR	Choi Bo-kyung (captain)
21	GK	KOR	Kim Jin-young

No.	Pos.	Nation	Player
24	MF	KOR	Park Se-jik
25	DF	KOR	Park Jong-min (vice-captain)
26	GK	KOR	Seo Ju-hwan
33	MF	KOR	Kim Hye-seong
37	DF	KOR	Kim Min-ho
39	FW	BRA	Vitinho
40	DF	CRO	Maks Čelić
45	DF	KOR	Choi Hyun-woung
55	DF	KOR	Jang Jun-young
66	DF	KOR	Jeong Woo-jae
70	FW	KOR	Park Ju-young
71	FW	KOR	Yun Je-hee
72	DF	KOR	Shin Il-yeon
79	FW	KOR	Sung Mun-gyeong
84	FW	GHA	Naeem Mohammed
88	MF	KOR	Jeong Se-jun
97	FW	AUS	Charles Lokolingoy

=== Out on loan ===
Note: Flags indicate national team as defined under FIFA eligibility rules; some limited exceptions apply. Players may hold more than one non-FIFA nationality.

No.	Pos.	Nation	Player
—	DF	KOR	Jeong Ye-jun (at Haman FC)
—	MF	KOR	Chung Ma-ho (at Gimcheon Sangmu for military service)
—	MF	KOR	Kim Jeong-hyeon (at Ansan Greeners)
—	MF	KOR	Yeo Hyun-jun (at Yeoju FC)

No.	Pos.	Nation	Player
—	FW	KOR	Jeong Taek-hyun (at Jecheon Citizen)
—	FW	KOR	Kang Min-geu (at Gimcheon Sangmu for military service)
—	FW	KOR	Lee Min-hyuk (at Pyeongtaek Citizen for military service)

== Backroom staff ==
=== Coaching staff ===
- Manager: (Brazil) André
- Head coach: (South Korea) Choi Sung-hwan
- Goalkeeping coach: (South Korea) Park Jong-moon
- Coach: (South Korea) Kim Jong-kook, (South Korea) Chun Ji-hoon
- Physical coach: (South Korea) Kwon Bo-sung

=== Support staff ===
- Trainers: (South Korea) Um Sung-hyun, (South Korea) Jung Sung-ryung, (South Korea) Oh Yoon
- Analyst: (Brazil) Raphael Gaspar
- Interpreter: (South Korea) Moon Jun-ho
- Equipment manager: (South Korea) Hwang Jun-ho
- Transport coordinator: (South Korea) Lee Jun-yeol
- Team manager: (South Korea) Choi Jin-soo

Source: Official website

== Honours ==
- K League 2
  - Runners-up (1): 2024
