= 2021 K League 1 =

39th season of the top division of professional football in South Korea

Hana 1Q K League 1
- Season: 2021
- Dates: 27 February – 5 December 2021
- Champions: Jeonbuk Hyundai Motors (9th title)
- Relegated: Gwangju FC
- Champions League: Jeonbuk Hyundai Motors; Ulsan Hyundai; Daegu FC
- Matches: 228
- Goals: 563 (2.47 per match)
- Best player: Hong Jeong-ho
- Top goalscorer: Joo Min-kyu (22 goals)
- Biggest home win: Ulsan 5–0 Gangwon (1 March 2021)
- Biggest away win: Daegu 0–5 Jeju (31 October 2021)
- Highest scoring: Seoul 3–4 Jeonbuk (5 September 2021)
- Highest attendance: 6,199
- Lowest attendance: 1,218

The 2021 K League 1, also known as the Hana 1Q K League 1 for sponsorship reasons, was the 39th season of the top division of professional football in South Korea, and the ninth season of the K League 1. Jeonbuk Hyundai Motors won their ninth title and fifth consecutive title.

After progressing 33 regular rounds, the league was divided into two groups, the top six and the bottom six, and each team played five matches against other teams in its group.

== Teams ==
=== Team changes ===
Relegated to K League 2

- Sangju Sangmu (renamed Gimcheon Sangmu)
- Busan IPark

Promoted from K League 2

- Jeju United
- Suwon FC

=== Locations ===
Locations of the 2021 K League 1 teams

The following twelve clubs competed in the K League 1 during the 2021 season.

Team	City/Province	Abbreviation
Daegu FC	Daegu	Daegu
Gangwon FC	Gangwon	Gangwon
Gwangju FC	Gwangju	Gwangju
Incheon United	Incheon	Incheon
Jeju United	Jeju	Jeju
Jeonbuk Hyundai Motors	Jeonbuk	Jeonbuk
Pohang Steelers	Pohang	Pohang
Seongnam FC	Seongnam	Seongnam
FC Seoul	Seoul	Seoul
Suwon Samsung Bluewings	Suwon	Suwon
Suwon FC	Suwon	Suwon FC
Ulsan Hyundai	Ulsan	Ulsan

=== Stadiums ===
Jeju United	Daegu FC	Incheon United
Jeju World Cup Stadium	DGB Daegu Bank Park	Incheon Football Stadium
Capacity: **29,791**	Capacity: **12,415**	Capacity: **20,891**
Pohang Steelers	Suwon FC	Seongnam FC
Pohang Steel Yard	Suwon Stadium	Tancheon Stadium
Capacity: **17,443**	Capacity: **11,808**	Capacity: **16,146**
FC Seoul		Suwon Samsung Bluewings Suwon FC
Seoul World Cup Stadium	Seoul Olympic Stadium	Suwon World Cup Stadium
Capacity: **66,704**	Capacity: **69,950**	Capacity: **44,031**
Gwangju FC		Jeonbuk Hyundai Motors
Gwangju World Cup Stadium	Gwangju Football Stadium	Jeonju World Cup Stadium
Capacity: **40,245**	Capacity: **12,000**	Capacity: **42,477**
Gangwon FC		Ulsan Hyundai
Chuncheon Songam Leports Town	Gangneung Stadium	Ulsan Munsu Football Stadium
Capacity: **20,000**	Capacity: **22,333**	Capacity: **44,102**

=== Personnel and sponsoring ===
Team	Manager	Main sponsor	Kit manufacturer	Other sponsor(s)
Daegu FC	(South Korea) Lee Byung-keun	Daegu Government	Goal Studio	DGB Daegu Bank; AJIN Industrial Co., Ltd.
Gangwon FC	(South Korea) Kim Byung-soo	Gangwon Provincial Government	Applerind	Kangwon Land
Gwangju FC	(South Korea) Kim Ho-young	Gwangju Government	Kelme	
Incheon United	(South Korea) Jo Sung-hwan	Incheon Government	Macron	Shinhan Bank; Incheon International Airport
Jeju United	(South Korea) Nam Ki-il	SK Energy	Puma	
Jeonbuk Hyundai Motors	(South Korea) Kim Sang-sik	Hyundai Motor Company	Hummel	
Pohang Steelers	(South Korea) Kim Gi-dong	POSCO	Puma	Pohang Government
Seongnam FC	(South Korea) Kim Nam-il	Seongnam Government	Umbro	
FC Seoul	(South Korea) Park Jin-sub	GS Group	Le Coq Sportif	
Suwon Samsung Bluewings	(South Korea) Park Kun-ha	Cheil Worldwide	Puma	Samsung Electronics
Suwon FC	(South Korea) Kim Do-kyun	Suwon Government	Hummel	
Ulsan Hyundai	(South Korea) Hong Myung-bo	Hyundai Heavy Industries	Hummel	Hyundai Oil Bank

=== Foreign players ===
Restricting the number of foreign players strictly to five per team, including a slot for a player from the Asian Football Confederation countries and a slot for a player from the Association of Southeast Asian Nations. A team could use five foreign players on the field each game, including at least one player from the AFC confederation. Samuel Pungi, who played for Pohang Steelers, was deemed to be a native player as he had been granted South Korean nationality.

Players in bold were registered during the mid-season transfer window.

Team	Player 1	Player 2	Player 3	AFC player	ASEAN player (Note: Did not exist in the regulation of AFC.)	Former player(s)
Daegu FC	(Brazil) Césinha	(Brazil) Edgar	(Brazil) **Lamas**	(Japan) Tsubasa Nishi		(Brazil) Serginho
Gangwon FC	(Serbia) Vladimir Silađi	(Bulgaria) **Momchil Tsvetanov**	(Serbia) **Matija Ljujić**	(Uzbekistan) Rustam Ashurmatov		(Japan) Masatoshi Ishida
Gwangju FC	(Brazil) Reis	(Serbia) Aleksandar Andrejević	(Brazil) **Johnathan**			(Brazil) Felipe
Incheon United	(Montenegro) Stefan Mugoša	(Costa Rica) Elías Aguilar	(Brazil) Negueba	(Australia) Harrison Delbridge		
Jeju United	(Poland) Oskar Zawada	(Guinea-Bissau) Gerso Fernandes				(Uzbekistan) Islom Kenjaboev
Jeonbuk Hyundai Motors	(The Gambia) Modou Barrow	(Brazil) Gustavo	(Russia) Stanislav Iljutcenko	(Japan) Takahiro Kunimoto	(Thailand) **Sasalak Haiprakhon**	
Pohang Steelers	(Colombia) Manuel Palacios	(Bosnia and Herzegovina) Mario Kvesić	(Ukraine) Borys Tashchy	(Australia) Alex Grant		
Seongnam FC	(Austria) Richard Windbichler	(Serbia) Fejsal Mulić	(Romania) Sergiu Buș	(Uzbekistan) Jamshid Iskanderov		
FC Seoul	(Spain) Osmar	(Serbia) Aleksandar Paločević	(Brazil) **Gabriel**	(Australia) **Connor Chapman**		(Uzbekistan) Ikromjon Alibaev
Suwon Samsung Bluewings	(Canada) Doneil Henry	(Serbia) Uroš Đerić	(Italy) Nicolao Dumitru			(Australia) Terry Antonis
Suwon FC	(South Africa) Lars Veldwijk	(Brazil) Murilo	(Brazil) **Tardeli**	(Australia) **Lachlan Jackson**		(Brazil) Victor
Ulsan Hyundai	(Netherlands) Dave Bulthuis	(Georgia (country)) Valeri Qazaishvili				(Australia) Jason Davidson (Austria) Lukas Hinterseer

== League table ==
Pos	Team	Pld	W	D	L	GF	GA	GD	Pts	Qualification or relegation (Note: Teams played each other three times (33 matches), before the league was split into two groups, the top six and the bottom six.)
1	Jeonbuk Hyundai Motors (C)	38	22	10	6	71	37	+34	76	Qualification for Champions League group stage
2	Ulsan Hyundai	38	21	11	6	64	41	+23	74	Qualification for Champions League play-off round
3	Daegu FC	38	15	10	13	41	48	−7	55	Qualification for Champions League play-off round
4	Jeju United	38	13	15	10	52	44	+8	54	
5	Suwon FC	38	14	9	15	53	57	−4	51	
6	Suwon Samsung Bluewings	38	12	10	16	42	50	−8	46	
7	FC Seoul	38	12	11	15	46	46	0	47	
8	Incheon United	38	12	11	15	38	45	−7	47	
9	Pohang Steelers	38	12	10	16	41	45	−4	46	
10	Seongnam FC	38	11	11	16	34	46	−12	44	
11	Gangwon FC (O)	38	10	13	15	40	51	−11	43	Qualification for relegation play-offs
12	Gwangju FC (R)	38	10	7	21	42	54	−12	37	Relegation to K League 2

Source: K League
Rules for classification: 1) Points; 2) Goals scored; 3) Goal difference; 4) Wins; 5) Head-to-head points
(C) Champions; (O) Play-off winners; (R) Relegated

== Positions by matchday ==
Leaders, qualification for Champions League group stage
Qualification for Champions League play-off round
Qualification for relegation play-offs
Relegation to K League 2

=== Round 1–33 ===
Team ╲ Round	1	2	3	4	5	6	7	8	9	10	11	12	13	14	15	16	17	18	19	20	21	22	23	24	25	26	27	28	29	30	31	32	33
Jeonbuk Hyundai Motors	2	4	2	2	1	1	1	1	1	1	1	1	1	1	1	1	1	1	2	2	2	3	2	2	2	2	2	2	2	2	2	2	1
Ulsan Hyundai	1	1	1	1	2	3	2	2	2	2	2	2	2	2	2	2	2	2	1	1	1	1	1	1	1	1	1	1	1	1	1	1	2
Daegu FC	5	8	11	10	10	9	11	11	11	10	8	6	4	3	4	4	4	4	4	2	5	2	4	4	6	7	4	4	3	3	3	3	3
Suwon FC	5	9	10	11	11	12	12	12	12	11	12	12	12	11	7	8	8	8	7	6	5	6	5	6	4	3	3	3	4	4	4	4	4
Jeju United	7	7	5	7	7	6	8	8	7	4	3	3	3	5	6	6	6	6	6	8	8	9	8	9	8	5	8	8	8	8	5	5	5
Suwon Samsung Bluewings	4	3	3	3	3	4	4	4	6	3	5	4	5	4	3	3	3	3	3	3	3	4	3	3	5	6	7	6	6	5	6	6	6
Pohang Steelers	3	2	4	4	6	7	6	9	8	6	4	5	6	6	5	5	5	5	5	3	6	6	6	5	3	5	6	5	7	6	7	7	7
Incheon United	9	6	8	9	8	8	10	10	10	12	11	11	9	10	10	7	7	7	8	6	7	5	7	7	8	4	5	7	7	7	8	9	8
FC Seoul	11	5	9	6	4	2	3	3	4	7	9	8	8	8	11	12	11	11	9	11	10	10	10	11	11	12	12	12	11	10	10	10	9
Gangwon FC	12	11	12	12	12	10	7	7	5	8	10	9	10	9	9	9	9	9	11	9	9	8	9	8	11	10	10	11	11	12	12	8	10
Seongnam FC	7	10	6	5	5	5	5	5	3	5	6	7	7	7	8	10	10	10	10	10	11	12	11	10	10	11	11	10	9	9	9	11	11
Gwangju FC	10	12	7	8	9	11	9	6	9	9	7	10	11	12	12	12	12	12	12	10	12	11	12	12	12	9	9	9	10	11	11	12	12

Source: K League

=== Round 34–38 ===
Team ╲ Round	34	35	36	37	38
Jeonbuk Hyundai Motors	1	1	1	1	1
Ulsan Hyundai	2	2	2	2	2
Daegu FC	3	3	3	3	3
Jeju United	4	4	4	4	4
Suwon FC	5	5	5	5	5
Suwon Samsung Bluewings	6	6	6	6	6
FC Seoul	11	10	9	9	7
Incheon United	7	8	8	8	8
Pohang Steelers	8	7	7	7	9
Seongnam FC	9	9	10	10	10
Gangwon FC	10	11	11	11	11
Gwangju FC	12	12	12	12	12

Source: K League

== Results ==
=== Matches 1–22 ===
Teams played each other twice, once at home, once away.

Home \ Away	DGU	GWN	GJU	ICU	JJU	JHM	PHS	SNM	SEL	SSB	SWN	USH
Daegu FC	—	1–0	1–4	3–0	1–1	1–0	1–1	0–0	1–1	1–0	1–1	2–1
Gangwon FC	3–0	—	0–1	2–0	2–2	1–1	1–3	0–0	0–0	3–0	0–0	2–2
Gwangju FC	0–1	3–1	—	2–1	0–0	0–2	0–1	0–0	1–1	3–4	2–0	0–1
Incheon United	2–1	1–0	2–1	—	0–3	1–1	1–1	1–0	0–1	0–0	4–1	0–0
Jeju United	1–2	1–1	1–1	1–4	—	1–1	1–0	2–2	2–1	2–1	1–3	1–2
Jeonbuk Hyundai Motors	3–2	2–1	3–0	5–0	1–1	—	0–1	1–0	2–0	1–3	1–1	2–4
Pohang Steelers	0–0	1–1	1–0	2–1	0–0	1–3	—	1–0	0–1	0–3	1–0	1–1
Seongnam FC	0–0	1–2	2–0	1–3	0–0	1–5	2–1	—	1–0	0–1	2–3	0–1
FC Seoul	0–1	0–1	2–1	0–1	0–1	3–4	1–2	2–2	—	0–3	3–0	0–0
Suwon Samsung Bluewings	1–1	1–1	1–0	1–2	3–2	1–3	1–1	1–0	1–2	—	1–2	3–0
Suwon FC	2–4	2–1	2–1	2–2	2–1	1–0	3–4	1–2	1–1	0–0	—	0–1
Ulsan Hyundai	2–1	5–0	2–0	3–1	0–0	0–0	1–0	2–2	3–2	1–1	2–5	—

Source: K League
Legend: Blue = home team win; Yellow = draw; Red = away team win.

=== Matches 23–33 ===
Teams played each other once, either at home or away.

Home \ Away	DGU	GWN	GJU	ICU	JJU	JHM	PHS	SNM	SEL	SSB	SWN	USH
Daegu FC	—	—	1–2	—	—	—	—	3–1	—	0–2	0–0	2–1
Gangwon FC	2–0	—	2–1	—	2–2	0–1	1–0	—	1–4	—	—	—
Gwangju FC	—	—	—	1–0	0–3 (Note: The match between Gwangju FC and Jeju United originally finished 1–1, but K League Federation awarded Jeju United a 3–0 win due to a violation of Gwangju FC, which exceeded substitutes allowance.)	1–2	2–3	2–0	—	—	—	—
Incheon United	2–0	0–1	—	—	1–2	—	—	0–1	—	0–1	0–0	—
Jeju United	0–1	—	—	—	—	2–2	—	2–1	1–0	—	—	2–2
Jeonbuk Hyundai Motors	2–1	—	—	2–0	—	—	2–0	—	3–2	1–0	2–2	—
Pohang Steelers	1–2	—	—	0–1	2–4	—	—	—	—	0–0	3–1	1–2
Seongnam FC	—	2–0	—	—	—	0–0	1–0	—	1–1	—	—	2–1
FC Seoul	1–1	—	1–0	0–0	—	—	2–2	—	—	—	2–1	1–2
Suwon Samsung Bluewings	—	3–2	2–2	—	0–0	—	—	1–2	0–2	—	0–3	—
Suwon FC	—	1–0	1–3	—	1–0	—	—	3–1	—	—	—	0–3
Ulsan Hyundai	—	2–1	1–0	3–2	—	0–0	—	—	—	3–1	—	—

Source: K League
Legend: Blue = home team win; Yellow = draw; Red = away team win.

=== Matches 34–38 ===
Teams played each other once, either at home or away.

==== Final A ====
Home \ Away	DGU	JJU	JHM	SSB	SWN	USH
Daegu FC	—	0–5	0–2	2–1	—	—
Jeju United	—	—	—	2–0	1–0	—
Jeonbuk Hyundai Motors	—	2–0	—	—	—	3–2
Suwon Samsung Bluewings	—	—	0–4	—	—	0–0
Suwon FC	1–2	—	3–2	2–0	—	—
Ulsan Hyundai	2–0	3–1	—	—	3–2	—

Source: K League
Legend: Blue = home team win; Yellow = draw; Red = away team win.

==== Final B ====
Home \ Away	GWN	GJU	ICU	PHS	SNM	SEL
Gangwon FC	—	—	1–1	—	2–1	—
Gwangju FC	2–2	—	1–1	—	—	3–4
Incheon United	—	—	—	0–0	—	2–0
Pohang Steelers	4–0	1–2	—	—	—	1–2
Seongnam FC	—	1–0	1–1	1–0	—	—
FC Seoul	0–0	—	—	—	3–0	—

Source: K League
Legend: Blue = home team win; Yellow = draw; Red = away team win.

== Relegation play-offs ==
The promotion-relegation play-offs were contested between the winners of K League 2 play-offs and the eleventh-placed team in K League 1.

8 December 2021
19:00 KST

Daejeon Hana Citizen	1–0	Gangwon FC
Lee Hyeon-sik 51'

Hanbat Sports Complex, Daejeon

12 December 2021
14:00 KST

Gangwon FC	4–1	Daejeon Hana Citizen
Lee Ji-sol 26' (o.g.); Lim Chae-min 28'; Han Kook-young 31'; Hwang Mun-ki 90+3'		Lee Jong-hyeon 17'

Gangneung Stadium, Gangneung

Gangwon FC won 4–2 on aggregate and therefore both clubs remain in their respective leagues.

== Statistics ==
=== Top goalscorers ===
Rank	Player	Club	Goals
1	(South Korea) Joo Min-kyu	Jeju United	22
2	(South Africa) Lars Veldwijk	Suwon FC	18
3	(Brazil) Gustavo	Jeonbuk Hyundai Motors	15
3	(Russia) Stanislav Iljutcenko	Jeonbuk Hyundai Motors	15
5	(Serbia) Fejsal Mulić	Seongnam FC	13
6	(South Korea) Lee Dong-jun	Ulsan Hyundai	11
6	(South Korea) Lim Sang-hyub	Pohang Steelers	11
8	(Brazil) Edgar	Daegu FC	10
8	(South Korea) Song Min-kyu	Pohang Steelers; Jeonbuk Hyundai Motors	10
8	(Serbia) Aleksandar Paločević	FC Seoul	10

=== Top assist providers ===
Rank	Player	Club	Assists
1	(South Korea) Kim Bo-kyung	Jeonbuk Hyundai Motors	10
1	(Brazil) Murilo	Suwon FC	10
3	(South Korea) Kang Sang-woo	Pohang Steelers	8
4	(South Korea) Lee Yeong-jae	Suwon FC	7
4	(Brazil) Cesinha	Daegu FC	7
4	(South Korea) Sin Jin-ho	Pohang Steelers	7
7	(Costa Rica) Elías Aguilar	Incheon United	6
7	(South Korea) Na Sang-ho	FC Seoul	6
7	(South Korea) Kim Tae-hwan	Ulsan Hyundai	6
7	(South Africa) Lars Veldwijk	Suwon FC	6

=== Hat-tricks ===
Player	For	Against	Result	Date
(South Korea) Lim Sang-hyub	Pohang Steelers	Suwon FC	3–4	18 May 2021
(Brazil) Gustavo^{4}	Jeonbouk Hyundai Motors	Seongnam FC	1–5	6 June 2021
(South Africa) Lars Veldwijk^{4}	Suwon FC	Ulsan Hyundai	2–5	25 July 2021

== Awards ==
=== Weekly awards ===
Round	Player of the Round	
Round	Player	Club
1	(South Korea) Kim In-sung	Ulsan Hyundai
2	(South Korea) Na Sang-ho	FC Seoul
3	(South Korea) Lee Dong-jun	Ulsan Hyundai
4	(Serbia) Fejsal Mulić	Seongnam FC
5	(Russia) Stanislav Iljutcenko	Jeonbuk Hyundai Motors
6	(Brazil) Cesinha	Daegu FC
7	(Russia) Stanislav Iljutcenko	Jeonbuk Hyundai Motors
8	(Georgia (country)) Valeri Qazaishvili	Ulsan Hyundai
9	(South Korea) Lee Seung-gi	Jeonbuk Hyundai Motors
10	(South Korea) Kim Gun-hee	Suwon Samsung Bluewings
11	(South Korea) Lee Han-do	Gwangju FC
12	(Brazil) Edgar	Daegu FC
13	(Brazil) Edgar	Daegu FC
14	(South Korea) Cho Yu-min	Suwon FC
15	(Brazil) Murilo	Suwon FC
16	(South Korea) Song Si-woo	Incheon United
17	(South Korea) Lim Sang-hyub	Pohang Steelers
18	(Brazil) Cesinha	Daegu FC
19	(South Korea) Lee Yeong-jae	Suwon FC

Round	Player of the Round	
Round	Player	Club
20	(South Korea) Go Young-joon	Pohang Steelers
21	(South Africa) Lars Veldwijk	Suwon FC
22	(South Korea) Ko Moo-yeol	Gangwon FC
23	(South Korea) Moon Seon-min	Jeonbuk Hyundai Motors
24	(South Korea) Um Won-sang	Gwangju FC
25	(South Korea) Lim Sang-hyub	Pohang Steelers
26	(South Korea) Lee Chung-yong	Ulsan Hyundai
27	(Georgia (country)) Valeri Qazaishvili	Ulsan Hyundai
28	(Brazil) Cesinha	Daegu FC
29	(South Korea) Lee Chang-min	Jeju United
30	(Brazil) Cesinha	Daegu FC
31	(South Korea) Lee Ki-je	Suwon Samsung Bluewings
32	(South Korea) Cho Young-wook	FC Seoul
33	(South Korea) Lee Ho-jae	Pohang Steelers
34	(Japan) Takahiro Kunimoto	Jeonbuk Hyundai Motors
35	(Brazil) Edgar	Daegu FC
36	(South Korea) Oh Se-hun	Ulsan Hyundai
37	(South Korea) Hong Jeong-ho	Jeonbuk Hyundai Motors
38	(South Korea) Han Kyo-won	Jeonbuk Hyundai Motors

=== Monthly awards ===
Month	Player of the Month		Young Player of the Month		Manager of the Month			Goal of the Month	
Month	Player	Club	Player	Club	Manager	Club	Div.	Player	Club
March	(South Korea) Ki Sung-yueng	Seoul	—		(South Korea) Kim Sang-sik	Jeonbuk	1	(South Korea) Kim Min-woo	Suwon
April	(Brazil) Edgar	Daegu	—		(South Korea) Lee Woo-hyung	Anyang	2	(Serbia) Fejsal Mulić	Seongnam
May	(Brazil) Cesinha	Daegu	—		(South Korea) Park Kun-ha	Suwon	1	(South Korea) Lee Ki-je	Suwon
June	—		—		(South Korea) Kim Tae-wan	Gimcheon	2	(South Korea) Paik Seung-ho	Jeonbuk
July	—		—		(South Korea) Jo Sung-hwan	Incheon	1	(South Africa) Lars Veldwijk	Suwon FC
August	(Brazil) Gustavo	Jeonbuk	(South Korea) Eom Ji-sung	Gwangju	(South Korea) Hong Myung-bo	Ulsan	1	(South Korea) Lee Chung-yong	Ulsan
September	(South Korea) Cho Young-wook	Seoul	(South Korea) Seol Young-woo	Ulsan	(South Korea) Lee Byung-keun	Daegu	1	(South Korea) Paik Seung-ho	Jeonbuk
October	(South Korea) Lee Dong-gyeong	Ulsan	(South Korea) Um Won-sang	Gwangju	(South Korea) Nam Ki-il	Jeju	1	(South Korea) Lee Hee-gyun	Gwangju
November	(South Korea) Hong Jeong-ho	Jeonbuk	(South Korea) Seol Young-woo	Ulsan	(South Korea) An Ik-soo	Seoul	1	(South Korea) Moon Seon-min	Jeonbuk

=== Annual awards ===
The 2021 K League Awards was held on 7 December 2021.

Award	Winner	Club
Most Valuable Player	(South Korea) Hong Jeong-ho	Jeonbuk Hyundai Motors
Young Player of the Year	(South Korea) Seol Young-woo	Ulsan Hyundai
Top goalscorer	(South Korea) Joo Min-kyu	Jeju United
Top assist provider	(South Korea) Kim Bo-kyung	Jeonbuk Hyundai Motors
Manager of the Year	(South Korea) Kim Sang-sik	Jeonbuk Hyundai Motors

Position	Best XI			
Goalkeeper	(South Korea) Jo Hyeon-woo (Ulsan)			
Defenders	(South Korea) Kang Sang-woo (Pohang)	(South Korea) Hong Jeong-ho (Jeonbuk)	(Netherlands) Dave Bulthuis (Ulsan)	(South Korea) Lee Ki-je (Suwon)
Midfielders	(South Korea) Lee Dong-jun (Ulsan)	(Brazil) Cesinha (Daegu)	(Georgia (country)) Valeri Qazaishvili (Ulsan)	(South Korea) Lim Sang-hyub (Pohang)
Forwards	(South Africa) Lars Veldwijk (Suwon FC)		(South Korea) Joo Min-kyu (Jeju)	

== Controversies ==
On 12 December 2021, Gangwon FC and Daejeon Hana Citizen faced one another in the second leg of the Promotion-relegation play-offs, with the latter team finding himself in advantage after winning the first leg 1–0. Played at Gangneung Stadium, Gangwon's home soil, the match saw the hosts secure a 4–1 comeback victory and maintain their spot in K League 1. However, the game was marred by a series of incidents, occurring between the first and the second half. After Han Kook-young had scored Gangwon's third goal in the 31st minute, the ball boys around the stadium reportedly started to delay giving the ball back to Daejeon players, an event that happened multiple times during the match and was possibly meant to waste time in favour of the hosts: the fans in the away sector reacted furiously, with some of them throwing plastic bottles in direction of one of the ball boys. The game still went ahead, as six minutes of extra time were added at the end of the second half. The K League administration decided to open an official investigation on the controversial events.

When asked to talk about the incidents, Gangwon's director Lee Young-pyo originally dismissed them, pointing out that similar instances were already common in European football, but later apologized, saying that he felt "direct responsibility" for the "unsmooth match" and promising that he would work so that Gangwon FC would become "a mature club" in the future. Meanwhile, on 21 December, just hours before K League's final disciplinary meeting took place, the Daejeon board released an official response to the matter, stating that there was "clear evidence of the game delays being intentional and organized", as well as noticing that such acts violated the league's Code of Ethics for fair play and respect.

In the end, the league's administration decided to keep the final score unchanged: however, Gangwon FC was fined 30 million South Korean Won (US$25,000) for the episodes of time wasting, whereas Daejeon Hana Citizen was fined 2 million South Korean Won (US$1,677) for their fans' behavior towards one of the ball boys.

== See also ==
- 2021 in South Korean football
- 2021 Korean FA Cup
