= 2021 K League 2 =

Ninth season of the K League 2, the second tier South Korean professional league

Hana 1Q K League 2
- Season: 2021
- Dates: 27 February – 31 October 2021
- Champions: Gimcheon Sangmu (1st title)
- Promoted: Gimcheon Sangmu
- Champions League: Jeonnam Dragons (via Korean FA Cup)
- Matches: 180
- Goals: 435 (2.42 per match)
- Best player: An Byong-jun
- Top goalscorer: An Byong-jun (23 goals)

The 2021 K League 2 was the ninth season of the K League 2, the second-tier South Korean professional football league. The champions and the winners of the promotion play-offs could be promoted to the K League 1.

== Teams ==
=== Team changes ===
Sangju Sangmu was renamed Gimcheon Sangmu and moved its city to Gimcheon before the season.

Relegated from K League 1

- Sangju Sangmu (renamed Gimcheon Sangmu)
- Busan IPark

Promoted to K League 1

- Jeju United
- Suwon FC

=== Locations ===
Locations of the 2021 K League 2 teams

Team	City/Province	Abbreviation
Ansan Greeners	Ansan	Ansan
FC Anyang	Anyang	Anyang
Bucheon FC 1995	Bucheon	Bucheon
Busan IPark	Busan	Busan
Chungnam Asan	Asan	Chungnam Asan
Daejeon Hana Citizen	Daejeon	Daejeon
Gimcheon Sangmu	Gimcheon	Gimcheon
Gyeongnam FC	Gyeongnam	Gyeongnam
Jeonnam Dragons	Jeonnam	Jeonnam
Seoul E-Land	Seoul	Seoul E

=== Stadiums ===
Ansan Greeners	FC Anyang	Bucheon FC 1995	Busan IPark	Chungnam Asan
Ansan Wa~ Stadium	Anyang Stadium	Bucheon Stadium	Busan Gudeok Stadium	Yi Sun-sin Stadium
Capacity: **35,000**	Capacity: **17,143**	Capacity: **34,456**	Capacity: **12,349**	Capacity: **17,376**
Daejeon Hana Citizen	Gimcheon Sangmu	Gyeongnam FC	Jeonnam Dragons	Seoul E-Land
Daejeon World Cup Stadium	Gimcheon Stadium	Changwon Football Center	Gwangyang Stadium	Seoul Olympic Stadium
Capacity: **40,535**	Capacity: **25,000**	Capacity: **15,074**	Capacity: **13,496**	Capacity: **69,950**

=== Personnel and sponsoring ===
Team	Manager	Kit manufacturer	Main sponsor
Ansan Greeners	(South Korea) Kim Gil-sik	Kappa	Ansan Government
FC Anyang	(South Korea) Lee Woo-hyung	Joma	Anyang Government
Bucheon FC 1995	(South Korea) Lee Young-min	Kappa	Bucheon Government
Busan IPark	(Portugal) Ricardo Peres	Adidas	HDC Group
Chungnam Asan	(South Korea) Park Dong-hyuk	Mizuno	Asan Government
Daejeon Hana Citizen	(South Korea) Lee Min-sung	Astore	Hana Financial Group
Gimcheon Sangmu	(South Korea) Kim Tae-wan	Kelme	Korea Armed Forces Athletic Corps; Gimcheon Government
Gyeongnam FC	(South Korea) Seol Ki-hyeon	Hummel	Gyeongnam Provincial Government
Jeonnam Dragons	(South Korea) Jeon Kyung-jun	Puma	POSCO
Seoul E-Land	(South Korea) Chung Jung-yong	New Balance	E-Land

Note: Flags indicate national team as has been defined under FIFA eligibility rules. Players may hold more than one non-FIFA nationality.

=== Managerial changes ===
Team	Outgoing	Manner	Date	Incoming	Date	Table
Busan IPark	(South Korea) Lee Ki-hyung (caretaker)	Caretaker	25 November 2020	(Portugal) Ricardo Peres	25 November 2020	Pre-season

=== Foreign players ===
Restricting the number of foreign players strictly to five per team, including a slot for a player from AFC and ASEAN countries. A team could use four foreign players on the field each game.

Military-owned team Gimcheon Sangmu is not allowed to sign any foreign players.

North Korean player An Byong-jun was deemed as a native player in K League by South Korean nationality law and passport.

Players in bold are players who join midway through the competition.

Team	Player 1	Player 2	Player 3	AFC player	ASEAN player	Former player(s)
Ansan Greeners	(Argentina) Santiago De Sagastizabal	(Brazil) Anderson Canhoto	(Brazil) Róbson Duarte	(Japan) Go Iwase	(Indonesia) Asnawi Mangkualam	
FC Anyang	(Brazil) Nilson Júnior	(Costa Rica) Jonathan Moya	(Ghana) Maxwell Acosty	(Japan) Ryosuke Tamura		
Bucheon FC 1995	(Brazil) Crislan	(Japan) Wataru Murofushi				
Busan IPark	(Croatia) Domagoj Drožđek	(Cyprus) Valentinos Sielis	(Portugal) **Renato Santos**	(Australia) **Ryan Edwards**		
Chungnam Asan	(Brazil) Alex Sandro	(Brazil) Matheus Alves				(Japan) Ryohei Michibuchi
Daejeon Hana Citizen	(Brazil) Bruno Baio	(Brazil) Matheus Pato	(Japan) **Masatoshi Ishida**	(Uzbekistan) **Ikromjon Alibaev**		(Brazil) Edinho
Gyeongnam FC	(Brazil) Hernandes	(Brazil) Willyan				
Jeonnam Dragons	(Brazil) Alex Martins	(Brazil) Jonathan Balotelli	(Nigeria) Samuel Nnamani	(Uzbekistan) Oleg Zoteyev		
Seoul E-Land	(Argentina) Nicolás Benegas	(Brazil) William Barbio	(Brazil) Leandro Ribeiro	(Japan) **Yuki Kobayashi**		

== League table ==
Pos	Team	Pld	W	D	L	GF	GA	GD	Pts	Promotion or qualification
1	Gimcheon Sangmu (C)	36	20	11	5	60	34	+26	71	Promotion to K League 1
2	FC Anyang	36	17	11	8	51	37	+14	62	Qualification for promotion play-offs semi-final
3	Daejeon Hana Citizen	36	17	7	12	53	48	+5	58	Qualification for promotion play-offs first round
4	Jeonnam Dragons	36	13	13	10	38	33	+5	52	Qualification for promotion play-offs first round and Champions League group stage (Note: Qualified as Korean FA Cup champions.)
5	Busan IPark	36	12	9	15	46	56	−10	45	
6	Gyeongnam FC	36	11	10	15	40	45	−5	43	
7	Ansan Greeners	36	11	10	15	37	49	−12	43	
8	Chungnam Asan	36	11	8	17	38	41	−3	41	
9	Seoul E-Land	36	8	13	15	40	39	+1	37	
10	Bucheon FC 1995	36	9	10	17	32	53	−21	37	

Source: K League Soccerway
Rules for classification: 1) Points; 2) Goals scored; 3) Goal difference; 4) Wins; 5) Head-to-head points
(C) Champions

== Positions by matchday ==
Leaders, promotion to K League 1
Qualification for promotion play-offs semi-final
Qualification for promotion play-offs first round

Team ╲ Round	1	2	3	4	5	6	7	8	9	10	11	12	13	14	15	16	17	18	19	20	21	22	23	24	25	26	27	28	29	30	31	32	33	34	35	36
Gimcheon Sangmu	4	9	6	8	7	7	8	6	8	5	7	7	8	7	5	4	3	2	1	3	2	1	1	1	1	1	1	1	1	1	1	1	1	1	1	1
FC Anyang	2	4	5	9	8	6	4	3	1	1	1	2	3	3	2	2	1	1	2	1	1	3	4	4	3	2	2	2	2	2	2	2	2	2	2	2
Daejeon Hana Citizen	2	4	8	3	2	1	1	1	2	2	3	3	2	1	3	3	4	4	4	5	5	4	3	3	2	3	3	3	3	3	3	3	3	3	3	3
Jeonnam Dragons	6	3	2	5	6	4	2	2	3	3	2	1	1	2	1	1	2	3	3	2	3	2	2	2	4	4	4	4	4	4	4	4	4	4	4	4
Busan IPark	10	7	10	4	5	8	7	8	6	7	5	6	4	4	6	5	5	5	5	4	4	5	5	5	6	6	7	7	7	7	5	5	5	5	5	5
Gyeongnam FC	8	10	9	9	10	10	10	9	9	8	8	8	7	6	4	6	7	7	7	7	7	7	6	6	5	5	6	6	5	5	6	6	6	6	6	6
Ansan Greeners	4	2	4	2	3	5	4	4	5	6	4	4	5	5	7	8	6	6	6	6	6	6	7	8	8	8	8	8	8	8	7	7	8	7	7	7
Chungnam Asan	6	8	3	7	4	3	6	7	7	9	9	9	9	9	9	9	9	9	10	9	9	8	8	7	7	7	5	5	6	6	8	8	7	8	8	8
Bucheon FC 1995	8	6	7	6	9	9	9	10	10	10	10	10	10	10	10	10	10	10	9	10	10	10	10	10	10	10	10	9	10	10	10	10	9	9	9	9
Seoul E-Land	1	1	1	1	1	2	3	5	4	4	6	5	6	8	8	7	8	8	8	8	8	9	9	9	9	9	9	10	9	9	9	9	10	10	10	10

Source: K League

== Results ==
=== Matches 1–18 ===
Home \ Away	ASG	AYG	BCN	BSI	CNAS	DJC	GCS	GNM	JND	SUE
Ansan Greeners	—	3–2	2–2	2–3	1–0	1–0	1–1	1–2	0–1	1–1
FC Anyang	1–2	—	2–0	2–1	2–1	0–1	0–0	0–1	0–0	0–0
Bucheon FC 1995	0–1	0–0	—	0–2	1–0	1–2	0–0	1–1	1–1	1–1
Busan IPark	1–1	4–5	1–1	—	0–0	4–1	2–1	2–3	0–1	0–3
Chungnam Asan	0–2	2–2	0–1	4–0	—	3–1	1–2	2–1	0–1	0–0
Daejeon Hana Citizen	0–0	1–2	4–1	1–2	1–1	—	1–2	2–1	1–1	2–1
Gimcheon Sangmu	3–0	0–0	1–0	1–0	3–1	1–1	—	1–2	1–1	2–0
Gyeongnam FC	1–1	1–2	3–0	1–2	2–1	1–2	1–2	—	0–2	0–0
Jeonnam Dragons	2–0	0–1	0–2	1–2	0–0	1–2	2–1	1–0	—	3–0
Seoul E-Land	1–0	1–2	4–0	0–1	0–1	0–1	4–0	1–1	1–1	—

Source: K League
Legend: Blue = home team win; Yellow = draw; Red = away team win.

=== Matches 19–36 ===
Home \ Away	ASG	AYG	BCN	BSI	CNAS	DJC	GCS	GNM	JND	SUE
Ansan Greeners	—	1–0	1–2	1–1	0–1	0–2	0–1	3–1	1–1	0–3
FC Anyang	1–1	—	4–1	1–1	1–0	1–2	2–2	0–0	1–1	2–1
Bucheon FC 1995	4–3	0–1	—	0–0	0–0	4–2	0–1	2–3	1–2	0–3
Busan IPark	4–0	1–3	0–1	—	2–1	1–1	0–6	1–0	0–1	1–1
Chungnam Asan	0–1	0–2	1–0	3–2	—	3–4	1–2	2–1	0–0	2–1
Daejeon Hana Citizen	4–1	3–1	1–1	3–1	1–0	—	1–4	1–0	2–1	0–2
Gimcheon Sangmu	1–0	2–4	2–0	2–2	2–0	2–1	—	0–0	3–1	3–1
Gyeongnam FC	0–2	2–1	2–0	1–0	1–1	1–0	2–3	—	0–2	3–3
Jeonnam Dragons	2–3	1–2	1–2	2–0	0–3	0–0	2–2	0–0	—	1–0
Seoul E-Land	0–0	0–1	1–2	1–2	1–3	2–1	0–0	1–1	1–1	—

Source: K League
Legend: Blue = home team win; Yellow = draw; Red = away team win.

== Promotion play-offs ==
The first round was contested between the third and fourth-placed teams, and the runners-up directly advanced to the second round. When the first and second round matches were finished as draws, their winners were decided on the regular season rankings without extra time and penalty shoot-outs. The winners of the second round competed with eleven-placed team of the K League 1 in the two-legged final for a K League 1 spot of the next season.

=== Bracket ===
First round
3	Daejeon Hana Citizen	0
4	Jeonnam Dragons	0

Semi-final
2	FC Anyang	1
3	Daejeon Hana Citizen	3

Final
Daejeon Hana Citizen	1	1	2
Gangwon FC	0	4	4

=== First round ===
3 November 2021
19:00 KST

Daejeon Hana Citizen	0–0	Jeonnam Dragons
	Report

Hanbat Sports Complex, Daejeon
Attendance: 1,982
Referee: Ahn Jae-hoon

=== Semi-final ===
7 November 2021
14:00 KST

FC Anyang	1–3	Daejeon Hana Citizen
Jonathan Moya 12'	Report	Park Jin-seob 32'; Bruno Baio 69', 85'

Anyang Stadium, Anyang
Attendance: 2,789
Referee: Park Byung-jin

=== Final ===
8 December 2021
19:00 KST

Daejeon Hana Citizen	1–0	Gangwon FC
Lee Hyeon-sik 51'

Hanbat Sports Complex, Daejeon

12 December 2021
14:00 KST

Gangwon FC	4–1	Daejeon Hana Citizen
Lee Ji-sol 26' (o.g.); Lim Chae-min 28'; Han Kook-young 31'; Hwang Mun-ki 90+3'		Lee Jong-hyeon 17'

Gangneung Stadium, Gangneung

Gangwon FC won 4–2 on aggregate and therefore both clubs remain in their respective leagues.

== Statistics ==
=== Top goalscorers ===
Rank	Player	Club	Goals
1	(North Korea) An Byong-jun	Busan IPark	23
2	(Costa Rica) Jonathan Moya	FC Anyang	13
2	(South Korea) Park Chang-joon	Bucheon FC 1995	13
4	(Brazil) Willyan	Gyeongnam FC	11
4	(Brazil) Jonathan Balotelli	Jeonnam Dragons	11
6	(Brazil) Hernandes	Gyeongnam FC	10
7	(Japan) Masatoshi Ishida	Daejeon Hana Citizen	9
7	(South Korea) Park Dong-jin	Gimcheon Sangmu	9
7	(South Korea) Kim Ryun-do	Ansan Greeners	9
10	(South Korea) Cho Gue-sung	Gimcheon Sangmu	8
10	(South Korea) Lee Jong-ho	Jeonnam Dragons	8
10	(South Korea) Park Jeong-in	Busan IPark	8
10	(Brazil) Róbson Duarte	Ansan Greeners	8
10	(South Korea) Kim In-kyun	Chungnam Asan	8

=== Top assist providers ===
Rank	Player	Club	Assists
1	(South Korea) Joo Hyeon-woo	FC Anyang	8
2	(Brazil) Leandro Ribeiro	Seoul E-Land	7
3	(South Korea) Park Tae-jun	FC Anyang	6
3	(South Korea) Baek Sung-dong	Gyeongnam FC	6
3	(South Korea) Lee Sang-min	Ansan Greeners	6
6	(South Korea) Kim Seung-seob	Daejeon Hana Citizen	5
6	(South Korea) Lee Hyeon-sik	Daejeon Hana Citizen	5
8	9 players		4

== Awards ==
=== Weekly awards ===
Round	Player of the Round	
Round	Player	Club
1	(South Korea) Jang Yun-ho	Seoul E-Land
2	(Argentina) Nicolás Benegas	Seoul E-Land
3	(Brazil) Willyan	Gyeongnam FC
4	(North Korea) An Byong-jun	Busan IPark
5	(South Korea) Go Jae-hyun	Seoul E-Land
6	(South Korea) Mo Jae-hyeon	FC Anyang
7	(South Korea) Kim Hyeon-uk	Jeonnam Dragons
8	(Brazil) Hernandes	Gyeongnam FC
9	(South Korea) Chang Hyuk-jin	Gyeongnam FC
10	(South Korea) Jung Min-ki	FC Anyang
11	(South Korea) Hwang Jun-ho	Busan IPark
12	(South Korea) Kim Dong-jin	Gyeongnam FC
13	(South Korea) Park In-hyeok	Daejeon Hana Citizen
14	(South Korea) Kim Kyung-jung	FC Anyang
15	(Brazil) Jonathan Balotelli	Jeonnam Dragons
16	(North Korea) An Byong-jun	Busan IPark
17	(Costa Rica) Jonathan Moya	FC Anyang
18	(South Korea) Heo Yong-joon	Gimcheon Sangmu

Round	Player of the Round	
Round	Player	Club
19	(South Korea) Choi Cheol-won	Bucheon FC 1995
20	(South Korea) Hong Chang-beom	FC Anyang
21	(South Korea) Park Jeong-in	Busan IPark
22	(South Korea) Kim Seung-seob	Daejeon Hana Citizen
23	(South Korea) Hwang Il-su	Gyeongnam FC
24	(South Korea) Kim In-kyun	Chungnam Asan
25	(South Korea) Seo Young-jae	Daejeon Hana Citizen
26	(South Korea) Heo Yong-joon	Gimcheon Sangmu
27	(South Korea) Lee Si-heon	Bucheon FC 1995
28	(South Korea) Oh Hyeon-gyu	Gimcheon Sangmu
29	(South Korea) Kim In-sung	Seoul E-Land
30	(South Korea) Cho Gue-sung	Gimcheon Sangmu
31	(South Korea) Park Ji-soo	Gimcheon Sangmu
32	(South Korea) Choi Jun	Busan IPark
33	(Japan) Masatohsi Ishida	Daejeon Hana Citizen
34	(South Korea) Lee Hyeon-sik	Daejeon Hana Citizen
35	(Japan) Masatohsi Ishida	Daejeon Hana Citizen
36	(South Korea) Lee Sang-min	Ansan Greeners

=== Monthly awards ===
Month	Manager of the Month		
Month	Manager	Club	Division
March	(South Korea) Kim Sang-sik	Jeonbuk Hyundai Motors	1
April	(South Korea) Lee Woo-hyung	FC Anyang	2
May	(South Korea) Park Kun-ha	Suwon Samsung Bluewings	1
June	(South Korea) Kim Tae-wan	Gimcheon Sangmu	2
July	(South Korea) Jo Sung-hwan	Incheon United	1
August	(South Korea) Hong Myung-bo	Ulsan Hyundai	1
September	(South Korea) Lee Byung-keun	Daegu FC	1
October	(South Korea) Nam Ki-il	Jeju United	1
November	(South Korea) An Ik-soo	FC Seoul	1

=== Annual awards ===
The 2021 K League Awards was held on 18 November 2021.

Award	Winner	Club
Most Valuable Player	(North Korea) An Byong-jun	Busan IPark
Young Player of the Year	(South Korea) Kim In-kyun	Chungnam Asan
Top goalscorer	(North Korea) An Byong-jun	Busan IPark
Top assist provider	(South Korea) Joo Hyeon-woo	FC Anyang
Manager of the Year	(South Korea) Kim Tae-wan	Gimcheon Sangmu

Position	Best XI			
Goalkeeper	(South Korea) Gu Sung-yun (Gimcheon)			
Defenders	(South Korea) Choi Jun (Busan)	(South Korea) Joo Hyeon-woo (Anyang)	(South Korea) Jung Seung-hyun (Gimcheon)	(South Korea) Seo Young-jae (Daejeon)
Midfielders	(Japan) Masatoshi Ishida (Daejeon)	(South Korea) Park Jin-seob (Daejeon)	(South Korea) Kim Hyeon-uk (Jeonnam)	(South Korea) Kim Kyung-jung (Anyang)
Forwards	(Costa Rica) Jonathan Moya (Anyang)		(North Korea) An Byong-jun (Busan)	

== Controversies ==
On 12 December 2021, Gangwon FC and Daejeon Hana Citizen faced one another in the second leg of the Promotion-relegation play-offs, with the latter team finding himself in advantage after winning the first leg 1–0. Played at Gangneung Stadium, Gangwon's home soil, the match saw the hosts secure a 4–1 comeback victory and maintain their spot in K League 1. However, the game was marred by a series of incidents, occurring between the first and the second half. After Han Kook-young had scored Gangwon's third goal in the 31st minute, the ball boys around the stadium reportedly started to delay giving the ball back to Daejeon players, an event that happened multiple times during the match and was possibly meant to waste time in favour of the hosts: the fans in the away sector reacted furiously, with some of them throwing plastic bottles in direction of one of the ball boys. The game still went ahead, as six minutes of extra time were added at the end of the second half. The K League administration decided to open an official investigation on the controversial events.

When asked to talk about the incidents, Gangwon's director Lee Young-pyo originally dismissed them, pointing out that similar instances were already common in European football, but later apologized, saying that he felt "direct responsibility" for the "unsmooth match" and promising that he would work so that Gangwon FC would become "a mature club" in the future. Meanwhile, on 21 December, just hours before K League's final disciplinary meeting took place, the Daejeon board released an official response to the matter, stating that there was "clear evidence of the game delays being intentional and organized", as well as noticing that such acts violated the league's Code of Ethics for fair play and respect.

In the end, the league's administration decided to keep the final score unchanged: however, Gangwon FC was fined 30 million South Korean Won (US$25,000) for the episodes of time wasting, whereas Daejeon Hana Citizen was fined 2 million South Korean Won (US$1,677) for their fans' behavior towards one of the ball boys.

== See also ==
- 2021 in South Korean football
- 2021 Korean FA Cup
