= 2021 in South Korean football =

Football in South Korea
- Season: 2021

Men's football
- K League 1: Jeonbuk Hyundai Motors
- K League 2: Gimcheon Sangmu
- K3 League: Gimpo FC
- K4 League: Pocheon Citizen
- Korean FA Cup: Jeonnam Dragons

Women's football
- WK League: Incheon Hyundai Steel Red Angels

This article shows a summary of the 2021 football season in South Korea.

== National teams ==
=== FIFA World Cup qualification ===
5 June AFC second round, Group H	South Korea	5–0	Turkmenistan	Goyang, South Korea
20:00 UTC+9	Hwang Ui-jo 10', 73'; Nam Tae-hee 45+2'; Kim Young-gwon 57'; Kwon Chang-hoon 63'	Report		Stadium: Goyang Stadium; Attendance: 3,932; Referee: Turki Al-Khudhayr (Saudi Arabia)

7 June AFC second round, Group H	South Korea	Cancelled	North Korea	Goyang, South Korea
20:00 UTC+9		Report		Stadium: Goyang Stadium

9 June AFC second round, Group H	Sri Lanka	0–5	South Korea	Goyang, South Korea
20:00 UTC+9		Report	Kim Shin-wook 14', 42' (pen.); Lee Dong-gyeong 22'; Hwang Hee-chan 53'; Jung Sang-bin 77'	Stadium: Goyang Stadium; Attendance: 4,008; Referee: Shen Yinhao (China)

13 June AFC second round, Group H	South Korea	2–1	Lebanon	Goyang, South Korea
15:00 UTC+9	Sabra 50' (o.g.); Son Heung-min 65' (pen.)	Report	Saad 12'	Stadium: Goyang Stadium; Attendance: 4,061; Referee: Khamis Al-Marri (Qatar)

AFC second round, Group H table
Pos	Team	Pld	W	D	L	GF	GA	GD	Pts	Qualification
1	South Korea	6	5	1	0	22	1	+21	16	Advance to AFC third round
2	Lebanon	6	3	1	2	11	8	+3	10	Advance to AFC third round
3	Turkmenistan	6	3	0	3	8	11	−3	9	
4	Sri Lanka	6	0	0	6	2	23	−21	0	
5	North Korea	0	0	0	0	0	0	0	0	Withdrawal

Source: FIFA
Rules for classification: Qualification tiebreakers

2 September AFC third round, Group A	South Korea	0–0	Iraq	Seoul, South Korea
20:00 UTC+9		Report		Stadium: Seoul World Cup Stadium; Attendance: 0 Referee: Nawaf Shukralla (Bahrain)

7 September AFC third round, Group A	South Korea	1–0	Lebanon	Suwon, South Korea
20:00 UTC+9	Kwon Chang-hoon 59'	Report		Stadium: Suwon World Cup Stadium; Attendance: 0 Referee: Ryuji Sato (Japan)

7 October AFC third round, Group A	South Korea	2–1	Syria	Ansan, South Korea
20:00 UTC+9	Hwang In-beom 47'; Son Heung-min 88'	Report	Kharbin 83'	Stadium: Ansan Wa~ Stadium; Attendance: 0 Referee: Abdulrahman Al-Jassim (Qatar)

12 October AFC third round, Group A	Iran	1–1	South Korea	Tehran, Iran
17:00 UTC+3:30	Jahanbakhsh 76'	Report	Son Heung-min 48'	Stadium: Azadi Stadium; Referee: Ahmed Al-Kaf (Oman)

11 November AFC third round, Group A	South Korea	1–0	United Arab Emirates	Goyang, South Korea
20:00 UTC+9	Hwang Hee-chan 36' (pen.)	Report		Stadium: Goyang Stadium; Attendance: 30,152; Referee: Ma Ning (China PR)

16 November AFC third round, Group A	Iraq	0–3	South Korea	Doha, Qatar
18:00 UTC+3		Report	Lee Jae-sung 33'; Son Heung-min 74' (pen.); Jeong Woo-yeong 80'	Stadium: Thani bin Jassim Stadium; Attendance: 0 Referee: Ilgiz Tantashev (Uzbekistan)

=== Summer Olympics ===
22 July Group B	New Zealand	1–0	South Korea	Kashima, Japan
17:00 UTC+9	Wood 70'	Report		Stadium: Kashima Stadium; Referee: Victor Gomes (South Africa)

25 July Group B	Romania	0–4	South Korea	Kashima, Japan
20:00 UTC+9		Report	Marin 27' (o.g.); Um Won-sang 59'; Lee Kang-in 84' (pen.), 90'	Stadium: Kashima Stadium; Referee: Jesús Valenzuela (Venezuela)

28 July Group B	South Korea	6–0	Honduras	Yokohama, Japan
17:30 UTC+9	Hwang Ui-jo 12' (pen.), 45+5', 52' (pen.); Won Du-jae 19' (pen.); Kim Jin-ya 64'; Lee Kang-in 82'	Report		Stadium: International Stadium Yokohama; Attendance: 0 Referee: Georgi Kabakov (Bulgaria)

Group B table
Pos	Team	Pld	W	D	L	GF	GA	GD	Pts	Qualification
1	South Korea	3	2	0	1	10	1	+9	6	Advance to knockout stage
2	New Zealand	3	1	1	1	3	3	0	4	Advance to knockout stage
3	Romania	3	1	1	1	1	4	−3	4	
4	Honduras	3	1	0	2	3	9	−6	3	

Source: IOC FIFA
Rules for classification: Group stage tiebreakers

31 July Quarter-finals	South Korea	3–6	Mexico	Yokohama, Japan
20:00 UTC+9	Lee Dong-gyeong 20', 51'; Hwang Ui-jo 90+1'	Report	Martín 12', 54'; Romo 30'; Córdova 39' (pen.), 63'; Aguirre 84'	Stadium: International Stadium Yokohama; Attendance: 0 Referee: Orel Grinfeld (Israel)

=== AFC U-23 Asian Cup qualification ===
25 October Group H	South Korea	3–0	Philippines	Jalan Besar, Singapore
18:00 UTC+9	Lee Kyu-hyuk 51'; Go Jae-hyun 72'; Park Jeong-in 89'	Report		Stadium: Jalan Besar Stadium; Attendance: 400; Referee: Yudai Yamamoto (Japan)

28 October Group H	Timor-Leste	0–6	South Korea	Jalan Besar, Singapore
18:00 UTC+9		Report	Park Jeong-in 29', 32', 49'; Choi Jun 31'; Oh Hyun-gyu 82'; Kim Se-yun 87'	Stadium: Jalan Besar Stadium; Attendance: 166; Referee: Ngô Duy Lân (Vietnam)

31 October Group H	South Korea	5–1	Singapore	Jalan Besar, Singapore
21:30 UTC+9	Kim Chan 3'; Cho Sang-jun 6'; Mahler 25' (o.g.); Park Jeong-in 40'; Choi Jun 52'	Report	Adam 57'	Stadium: Jalan Besar Stadium; Attendance: 993; Referee: Hussein Abo Yehia (Lebanon)

Group H table
Pos	Team	Pld	W	D	L	GF	GA	GD	Pts	Qualification
1	South Korea	3	3	0	0	14	1	+13	9	Qualification for AFC U-23 Championship
2	Singapore (H)	3	1	1	1	4	7	−3	4	
3	Timor-Leste	3	1	1	1	3	8	−5	4	
4	Philippines	3	0	0	3	0	5	−5	0	

Source: AFC
Rules for classification: Qualification tiebreakers
(H) Hosts

=== Friendlies ===
==== Senior team ====
25 March	Japan	3–0	South Korea	Yokohama, Japan
19:20 UTC+9	Yamane 16'; Kamada 27'; Endo 83'	Report		Stadium: Nissan Stadium; Referee: Rowan Arumughan (India)

==== Under-23 team ====
12 June	South Korea	3–1	Ghana	Seogwipo, South Korea
	Lee Sang-min 18'; Lee Seung-mo 59'; Cho Gue-sung 66'	Report	Obeng 76'	Stadium: Jeju World Cup Stadium; Attendance: 2,532; Referee: Chae Sang-hyub (Korea)

15 June	South Korea	2–1	Ghana	Seogwipo, South Korea
	Jeong Woo-yeong 41'; Lee Dong-jun 65'	Report	Barnes 51'	Stadium: Jeju World Cup Stadium; Attendance: 2,337; Referee: Choi Hyun-jae (Korea)

13 July	South Korea	2–2	Argentina	Yongin, South Korea
	Lee Dong-gyeong 35'; Um Won-sang 90+2'	Report	Mac Allister 12'; Vaenzuela 55'	Stadium: Yongin Mireu Stadium; Attendance: 0 Referee: Kim Woo-sung (South Korea)

16 July	South Korea	1–2	France	Seoul, South Korea
	Kwon Chang-hoon 63' (pen.)	Report	Kolo Muani 84'; Mbuku 89'	Stadium: Seoul World Cup Stadium; Attendance: 0 Referee: Kim Jong-hyeok (South Korea)

==== Women's team ====
27 November	South Korea	2–1	New Zealand	Goyang, South Korea
14:00 KST (UTC+9)	Moore 59' (o.g.); Lim Seon-joo 81'	Report	Hand 25'	Stadium: Goyang Stadium

30 November	South Korea	0–2	New Zealand	Goyang, South Korea
19:00 KST (UTC+9)		Report	Satchell 83'; Rennie 85'	Stadium: Goyang Stadium

== Leagues ==
=== K League 1 ===
Pos	Team	Pld	W	D	L	GF	GA	GD	Pts	Qualification or relegation (Note: Teams played each other three times (33 matches), before the league was split into two groups, the top six and the bottom six.)
1	Jeonbuk Hyundai Motors (C)	38	22	10	6	71	37	+34	76	Qualification for Champions League group stage
2	Ulsan Hyundai	38	21	11	6	64	41	+23	74	Qualification for Champions League play-off round
3	Daegu FC	38	15	10	13	41	48	−7	55	Qualification for Champions League play-off round
4	Jeju United	38	13	15	10	52	44	+8	54	
5	Suwon FC	38	14	9	15	53	57	−4	51	
6	Suwon Samsung Bluewings	38	12	10	16	42	50	−8	46	
7	FC Seoul	38	12	11	15	46	46	0	47	
8	Incheon United	38	12	11	15	38	45	−7	47	
9	Pohang Steelers	38	12	10	16	41	45	−4	46	
10	Seongnam FC	38	11	11	16	34	46	−12	44	
11	Gangwon FC (O)	38	10	13	15	40	51	−11	43	Qualification for relegation play-offs
12	Gwangju FC (R)	38	10	7	21	42	54	−12	37	Relegation to K League 2

Source: K League
Rules for classification: 1) Points; 2) Goals scored; 3) Goal difference; 4) Wins; 5) Head-to-head points
(C) Champions; (O) Play-off winners; (R) Relegated

=== K League 2 ===
==== Regular season ====
Pos	Team	Pld	W	D	L	GF	GA	GD	Pts	Promotion or qualification
1	Gimcheon Sangmu (C)	36	20	11	5	60	34	+26	71	Promotion to K League 1
2	FC Anyang	36	17	11	8	51	37	+14	62	Qualification for promotion play-offs semi-final
3	Daejeon Hana Citizen	36	17	7	12	53	48	+5	58	Qualification for promotion play-offs first round
4	Jeonnam Dragons	36	13	13	10	38	33	+5	52	Qualification for promotion play-offs first round and Champions League group stage (Note: Qualified as Korean FA Cup champions.)
5	Busan IPark	36	12	9	15	46	56	−10	45	
6	Gyeongnam FC	36	11	10	15	40	45	−5	43	
7	Ansan Greeners	36	11	10	15	37	49	−12	43	
8	Chungnam Asan	36	11	8	17	38	41	−3	41	
9	Seoul E-Land	36	8	13	15	40	39	+1	37	
10	Bucheon FC 1995	36	9	10	17	32	53	−21	37	

Source: K League Soccerway
Rules for classification: 1) Points; 2) Goals scored; 3) Goal difference; 4) Wins; 5) Head-to-head points
(C) Champions

==== Promotion play-offs ====
First round
3	Daejeon Hana Citizen	0
4	Jeonnam Dragons	0

Semi-final
2	FC Anyang	1
3	Daejeon Hana Citizen	3

Final
Daejeon Hana Citizen	1	1	2
Gangwon FC	0	4	4

=== K3 League ===
==== Regular season ====
Pos	Team	Pld	W	D	L	GF	GA	GD	Pts	Qualification or relegation
1	Cheonan City	28	16	6	6	50	25	+25	54	Qualification for Championship final
2	Gimpo FC (C, P)	28	14	10	4	35	20	+15	52	Qualification for Championship semi-final and K League 2
3	Mokpo City	28	14	8	6	34	23	+11	50	Qualification for Championship first round
4	Gyeongju KHNP	28	13	7	8	39	30	+9	46	Qualification for Championship first round
5	Gimhae FC	28	12	8	8	39	35	+4	44	
6	Busan Transportation Corporation	28	11	8	9	32	33	−1	41	
7	Ulsan Citizen	28	9	11	8	32	24	+8	38	
8	Changwon City	28	9	11	8	28	27	+1	38	
9	Daejeon Korail	28	8	12	8	32	30	+2	36	
10	Paju Citizen	28	8	11	9	32	36	−4	35	
11	Cheongju FC	28	9	7	12	37	39	−2	34	
12	Hwaseong FC	28	8	10	10	29	34	−5	34	
13	Gangneung City	28	4	8	16	23	42	−19	20	
14	Yangju Citizen	28	4	8	16	17	43	−26	20	
15	Pyeongtaek Citizen (R)	28	5	7	16	20	38	−18	2	Relegation to K4 League

Source: Soccerway Flashscore
Rules for classification: 1) Points; 2) Goal difference; 3) Goals scored; 4) Wins
(C) Champions; (P) Promoted; (R) Relegated

==== Championship play-offs ====
First round
3	Mokpo City	1
4	Gyeongju KHNP	1

Semi-final
2	Gimpo FC	2
3	Mokpo City	0

Final
Gimpo FC	1	2	3
1	Cheonan City	0	2	2

=== K4 League ===
==== Regular season ====
Pos	Team	Pld	W	D	L	GF	GA	GD	Pts	Qualification
1	Pocheon Citizen (C, P)	30	21	6	3	80	28	+52	69	Promotion to K3 League
2	Siheung Citizen (P)	30	21	4	5	75	32	+43	67	Promotion to K3 League
3	Dangjin Citizen (O, P)	30	19	5	6	60	40	+20	62	Qualification for promotion play-off
4	Chungju Citizen	30	17	6	7	60	31	+29	57	Qualification for promotion play-off
5	Jinju Citizen	30	16	8	6	57	28	+29	56	
6	Geoje Citizen	30	13	8	9	50	39	+11	47	
7	Pyeongchang United	30	14	4	12	43	49	−6	46	
8	Gangwon FC B	30	11	7	12	50	44	+6	40	
9	FC Namdong	30	11	3	16	39	47	−8	36	
10	Chuncheon Citizen	30	10	6	14	40	51	−11	36	
11	Seoul Nowon United	30	9	5	16	40	53	−13	32	
12	Yeoju FC	30	8	6	16	34	58	−24	30	
13	Yangpyeong FC	30	7	8	15	39	52	−13	29	
14	Seoul Jungnang	30	6	7	17	33	62	−29	25	
15	Jeonju Citizen	30	7	3	20	39	71	−32	24	
16	Goyang Citizen	30	5	4	21	30	84	−54	19	

Source: Soccerway JoinKFA
Rules for classification: 1) Points; 2) Goal difference; 3) Head-to-head points; 4) Goals scored; 5) Wins
(C) Champions; (O) Play-off winners; (P) Promoted

==== Promotion play-off ====
When the match was finished as a draw, its winners were decided on the regular season rankings without extra time and penalty shoot-out.

14 November 2021
14:00 (UTC+9)

Dangjin Citizen	1–1	Chungju Citizen

Dangjin Stadium, Dangjin

=== WK League ===
==== Regular season ====
Pos	Team	Pld	W	D	L	GF	GA	GD	Pts	Qualification
1	Incheon Hyundai Steel Red Angels (C)	21	17	1	3	51	14	+37	52	Qualification for play-offs final
2	Gyeongju KHNP	21	16	3	2	59	17	+42	51	Qualification for play-offs semi-final
3	Suwon UDC	21	9	3	9	35	27	+8	30	Qualification for play-offs semi-final
4	Seoul WFC	21	9	3	9	28	44	−16	30	
5	Hwacheon KSPO	21	7	7	7	28	30	−2	28	
6	Boeun Sangmu	21	5	7	9	16	30	−14	22	
7	Sejong Sportstoto	21	4	2	15	17	44	−27	14	
8	Changnyeong WFC	21	1	6	14	19	47	−28	9	

Source: Soccerway
(C) Champions

==== Championship play-offs ====
Semi-final			Final
			1	Incheon Hyundai Steel Red Angels	1	1	2
2	Gyeongju KHNP	5		Gyeongju KHNP	1	0	1
3	Suwon UDC	4

== Domestic cups ==
=== Korean FA Cup ===
Round of 16 (Fourth round)
Jeonnam Dragons (p)	2 (5)
Busan Transportation Corporation	2 (3)
Pohang Steelers	3
Chungnam Asan	1
Ulsan Hyundai	3
Gyeongnam FC	0
Yangju Citizen (p)	0 (10)
Jeonbuk Hyundai Motors	0 (9)
Daegu FC	2
Gimhae City	0
Gimcheon Sangmu (a.e.t.)	3
Seongnam FC	2
Gangwon FC	2
Seoul E-Land	0
Suwon Samsung Bluewings (p)	0 (4)
FC Anyang	0 (2)

Quarter-finals (Fifth round)
Jeonnam Dragons	1
Pohang Steelers	0
Ulsan Hyundai	2
Yangju Citizen	0
Daegu FC	2
Gimcheon Sangmu	1
Gangwon FC	2
Suwon Samsung Bluewings	0

Semi-finals (Sixth round)
Jeonnam Dragons	2
Ulsan Hyundai	1
Daegu FC	1
Gangwon FC	0

Final (Seventh round)
Jeonnam Dragons (a)	0	4	4
Daegu FC	1	3	4

== International cups ==
=== FIFA Club World Cup ===
Team	Result	Round	Score	Opponent
Ulsan Hyundai	Sixth place	Quarter-finals	1–2	(Mexico) UANL
Ulsan Hyundai	Sixth place	Fifth place match	1–3	(Qatar) Al-Duhail

=== AFC Champions League ===
Team	Result	Round	Aggregate	Score	Opponent
Daegu FC	Round of 16	Group I	Runners-up	1–3	(Japan) Kawasaki Frontale
Daegu FC	Round of 16	Group I	Runners-up	2–3	(Japan) Kawasaki Frontale
Daegu FC	Round of 16	Group I	Runners-up	7–0	(Philippines) United City
Daegu FC	Round of 16	Group I	Runners-up	4–0	(Philippines) United City
Daegu FC	Round of 16	Group I	Runners-up	5–0	(China) Beijing Guoan
Daegu FC	Round of 16	Group I	Runners-up	3–0	(China) Beijing Guoan
Daegu FC	Round of 16	Round of 16	2–4	2–4	(Japan) Nagoya Grampus
Jeonbuk Hyundai Motors	Quarter-finals	Group H	Winners	2–1	(Thailand) Chiangrai United
Jeonbuk Hyundai Motors	Quarter-finals	Group H	Winners	3–1	(Thailand) Chiangrai United
Jeonbuk Hyundai Motors	Quarter-finals	Group H	Winners	2–2	(Japan) Gamba Osaka
Jeonbuk Hyundai Motors	Quarter-finals	Group H	Winners	2–1	(Japan) Gamba Osaka
Jeonbuk Hyundai Motors	Quarter-finals	Group H	Winners	9–0	(Singapore) Tampines Rovers
Jeonbuk Hyundai Motors	Quarter-finals	Group H	Winners	4–0	(Singapore) Tampines Rovers
Jeonbuk Hyundai Motors	Quarter-finals	Round of 16	1–1 (4–2 p)	1–1 (a.e.t.)	(Thailand) BG Pathum United
Jeonbuk Hyundai Motors	Quarter-finals	Quarter-finals	2–3	2–3 (a.e.t.)	(South Korea) Ulsan Hyundai
Pohang Steelers	Runners-up	Group G	Runners-up	2–0	(Thailand) Ratchaburi Mitr Phol
Pohang Steelers	Runners-up	Group G	Runners-up	0–0	(Thailand) Ratchaburi Mitr Phol
Pohang Steelers	Runners-up	Group G	Runners-up	0–3	(Japan) Nagoya Grampus
Pohang Steelers	Runners-up	Group G	Runners-up	1–1	(Japan) Nagoya Grampus
Pohang Steelers	Runners-up	Group G	Runners-up	4–1	(Malaysia) Johor Darul Ta'zim
Pohang Steelers	Runners-up	Group G	Runners-up	2–0	(Malaysia) Johor Darul Ta'zim
Pohang Steelers	Runners-up	Round of 16	1–0	1–0	(Japan) Cerezo Osaka
Pohang Steelers	Runners-up	Quarter-finals	3–0	3–0	(Japan) Nagoya Grampus
Pohang Steelers	Runners-up	Semi-finals	1–1 (5–4 p)	1–1 (a.e.t.)	(South Korea) Ulsan Hyundai
Pohang Steelers	Runners-up	Final	0–2	0–2	(Saudi Arabia) Al-Hilal
Ulsan Hyundai	Semi-finals	Group F	Winners	1–0	(Vietnam) Viettel
Ulsan Hyundai	Semi-finals	Group F	Winners	3–0	(Vietnam) Viettel
Ulsan Hyundai	Semi-finals	Group F	Winners	2–0	(Thailand) BG Pathum United
Ulsan Hyundai	Semi-finals	Group F	Winners	2–0	(Thailand) BG Pathum United
Ulsan Hyundai	Semi-finals	Group F	Winners	3–0	(Philippines) Kaya–Iloilo
Ulsan Hyundai	Semi-finals	Group F	Winners	2–1	(Philippines) Kaya–Iloilo
Ulsan Hyundai	Semi-finals	Round of 16	0–0 (3–2 p)	0–0 (a.e.t.)	(Japan) Kawasaki Frontale
Ulsan Hyundai	Semi-finals	Quarter-finals	3–2	3–2 (a.e.t.)	(South Korea) Jeonbuk Hyundai Motors
Ulsan Hyundai	Semi-finals	Semi-finals	1–1 (4–5 p)	1–1 (a.e.t.)	(South Korea) Pohang Steelers

== See also ==
- Football in South Korea
