= Hwang Jun-ho =

Hwang Jun-ho may refer to:

- Hwang Jun-ho (skier)
- Hwang Jun-ho (footballer)
- Hwang Jun-ho (Squid Game), a Squid Game character
