= 2021 Korean FA Cup =

2021 Hana Bank FA Cup

Tournament details
- Country: South Korea
- Dates: 6 March – 11 December 2021
- Teams: 59

Final positions
- Champions: Jeonnam Dragons (4th title)
- Runners-up: Daegu FC
- Champions League: Jeonnam Dragons

Tournament statistics
- Top goal scorer: Park Hee-seong (4 goals)

Awards
- Best player: Jeong Jae-hee

The 2021 Korean FA Cup, known as the 2021 Hana Bank FA Cup due to sponsorship agreement with Hana Bank, was the 26th edition of the Korean FA Cup. Similar to the previous year, U-League teams did not participate, and the top ten sides from the K5 League gained qualification instead.

Jeonbuk Hyundai Motors were the defending champions, but were defeated by Yangju Citizen in the round of 16.

Jeonnam Dragons defeated Daegu FC in the final on the away goals rule (4–4 on aggregate) to win their fourth cup title. As winners, they qualified for the 2022 AFC Champions League group stage.

== Schedule ==
Round	Date	Matches	Clubs remaining	Clubs involved	New entries this round
First round	6–7 March	15	59	31	9 K3 League teams 12 K4 League teams 10 K5 League teams (1 team advanced to the second round by a default win after the draw.)
Second round	27–28 March	16	44	16+16	6 K3 League teams 10 K League 2 teams
Third round	14 April	12	28	16+8	8 K League 1 teams
Round of 16	26 May	8	16	12+4	4 Champions League teams
Quarter-finals	11 August	4	8	8	None
Semi-finals	27 October	2	4	4	None
Final	24 November – 11 December	2	2	2	None

== Bracket ==
Round of 16 (Fourth round)
Jeonnam Dragons (p)	2 (5)
Busan Transportation Corporation	2 (3)
Pohang Steelers	3
Chungnam Asan	1
Ulsan Hyundai	3
Gyeongnam FC	0
Yangju Citizen (p)	0 (10)
Jeonbuk Hyundai Motors	0 (9)
Daegu FC	2
Gimhae City	0
Gimcheon Sangmu (a.e.t.)	3
Seongnam FC	2
Gangwon FC	2
Seoul E-Land	0
Suwon Samsung Bluewings (p)	0 (4)
FC Anyang	0 (2)

Quarter-finals (Fifth round)
Jeonnam Dragons	1
Pohang Steelers	0
Ulsan Hyundai	2
Yangju Citizen	0
Daegu FC	2
Gimcheon Sangmu	1
Gangwon FC	2
Suwon Samsung Bluewings	0

Semi-finals (Sixth round)
Jeonnam Dragons	2
Ulsan Hyundai	1
Daegu FC	1
Gangwon FC	0

Final (Seventh round)
Jeonnam Dragons (a)	0	4	4
Daegu FC	1	3	4

== First round ==
The draw was held on 4 February 2021.

6 March 2021	Pocheon Citizen (4)	0–0 (a.e.t.) (3–2 p)	Changwon City (3)
(UTC+9)

7 March 2021	Yangju Citizen (3)	1–1 (a.e.t.) (4–3 p)	Jinju Citizen (4)
(UTC+9)

6 March 2021	Seoul United (4)	0–1	Paju Citizen (3)
14:00 (UTC+9)

7 March 2021	Cheonan City (3)	4–1	FC Namdong (4)
(UTC+9)

6 March 2021	Siheung Citizen (4)	2–0	Ulsan Citizen (3)
14:00 (UTC+9)

7 March 2021	FC Together (5)	0–2	Zamiks FC (5)
(UTC+9)

6 March 2021	Phoenix FC (5)	1–2 (a.e.t.)	Pyeongtaek Citizen (3)
(UTC+9)

7 March 2021	523 FC (5)	0–9	Jeonju Citizen (4)
(UTC+9)

6 March 2021	Chungju Citizen (4)	1–1 (a.e.t.) (5–6 p)	Yangpyeong FC (4)
(UTC+9)

7 March 2021	Yeoju FC (4)	4–4 (a.e.t.) (4–5 p)	Goyang Citizen (4)
(UTC+9)

6 March 2021	SMC Engineering (5)	0–5	Cheongju FC (3)
(UTC+9)

7 March 2021	Majang Football Club (5)	0–3	Songwol FC (5)
(UTC+9)

6 March 2021	Daejeon Korail (3)	3–1	Hwajeong FC (5)
(UTC+9)

7 March 2021	Seoul Jungnang (4)	0–2	Gimpo FC (3)
(UTC+9)

6 March 2021	Chuncheon Citizen (4)	5–1	Doksuri (Eagles) FC (5)
(UTC+9)

7 March 2021	Cheongsol FC (5)	Bye
(UTC+9)

== Second round ==
28 March 2021	Pocheon Citizen (4)	1–0	Gangneung City (3)	Pocheon Stadium, Pocheon, Gyeonggi-do
14:00 (UTC+9)

27 March 2021	Gyeongju KHNP (3)	0–0 (a.e.t.) (3–4 p)	Yangju Citizen (3)	Gyeongju Stadium, Gyeongju
14:00 (UTC+9)
	Penalties
	Penalty scored Penalty missed		Penalty scored Penalty missed

28 March 2021	Paju Citizen (3)	1–4 (a.e.t.)	Daejeon Hana Citizen (2)	Paju Stadium, Paju, Gyeonggi-do
14:00 (UTC+9)

27 March 2021	FC Anyang (2)	5–1	Cheonan City (3)	Anyang Stadium, Anyang, Gyeonggi-do
14:00 (UTC+9)

28 March 2021	Gimhae City (3)	2–1	Siheung Citizen (4)	Gimhae Stadium, Gimhae, South Gyeongsang
14:00 (UTC+9)

27 March 2021	Bucheon FC 1995 (2)	3–1	Jaemix FC (5)	Bucheon Stadium, Bucheon, Gyeonggi-do
14:00 (UTC+9)

28 March 2021	Gimcheon Sangmu (2)	8–0	Pyeongtaek Citizen (3)	Gimcheon Stadium, Gimcheon, North Gyeongsang
14:00 (UTC+9)

27 March 2021	Busan IPark (2)	2–1 (a.e.t.)	Jeonju Citizen (4)	Gudeok Stadium, Busan
14:00 (UTC+9)

28 March 2021	Ansan Greeners (2)	1–0	Yangpyeong FC (4)	Ansan Wa~ Stadium, Ansan, Gyeonggi-do
16:00 (UTC+9)

27 March 2021	Chungnam Asan (2)	3–1	Goyang Citizen (4)	Yi Sun-sin Stadium, Asan
16:00 (UTC+9)

28 March 2021	Cheongju FC (3)	1–1 (a.e.t.) (5–4 p)	Hwaseong FC (3)	Cheongju Stadium, Cheongju
16:00 (UTC+9)
	Penalties
	Penalty scored		Penalty scored Penalty missed

27 March 2021	Seoul E-Land (2)	5–0	Songwol FC (5)	Seoul Olympic Stadium, Seoul
16:00 (UTC+9)

28 March 2021	Daejeon Korail (3)	0–1	Gyeongnam FC (2)	Hanbat Sports Complex, Daejeon
16:00 (UTC+9)

27 March 2021	FC Mokpo (3)	1–0	Gimpo FC (3)	Mokpo International Football Center, Mokpo
16:00 (UTC+9)

28 March 2021	Chuncheon Citizen (4)	0–3	Busan Transportation Corporation (3)	Chuncheon Songam Sports Town, Chuncheon
16:00 (UTC+9)

27 March 2021	Jeonnam Dragons (2)	11–0	Cheongsol FC (5)	Gwangyang Football Stadium, Gwangyang
16:00 (UTC+9)				Attendance: 0

== Third round ==
14 April 2021	Pocheon Citizen (4)	0–2	Yangju Citizen (3)	Pocheon Stadium, Pocheon, Gyeonggi-do
19:00 (UTC+9)

14 April 2021	Daejeon Hana Citizen (2)	1–2	Suwon Samsung Bluewings (1)	Daejeon World Cup Stadium, Daejeon
19:00 (UTC+9)	6' Baio		1' Đerić; 65' Choi Jeong-won

14 April 2021	Incheon United (1)	0–3	FC Anyang (2)	Incheon Football Stadium, Incheon
19:00 (UTC+9)			8' Nilson Junior; 52' Jeong Jun-yeon; 76' Ha Seung-un

14 April 2021	Gimhae City (3)	1–1 (a.e.t.) (4–3 p)	Bucheon FC 1995 (2)	Gimhae Stadium, Gimhae, South Gyeongsang
19:00 (UTC+9)	65' Kim Min-shik		54' Ahn Jae-jun
	Penalties
	Penalty scored Penalty missed		Penalty scored Penalty missed

14 April 2021	Gimcheon Sangmu (2)	1–0	Jeju United (1)	Gimcheon Stadium, Gimcheon
19:00 (UTC+9)	75' Lee Geun-ho

14 April 2021	Seongnam FC (1)	1–0	Busan IPark (2)	Tancheon Stadium, Seongnam, Gyeonggi-do
19:00 (UTC+9)	36' Lee Joong-min

14 April 2021	Ansan Greeners (2)	0–1	Chungnam Asan (2)	Ansan Wa~ Stadium, Ansan, Gyeonggi-do
19:00 (UTC+9)			49' Mattheus

14 April 2021	Cheongju FC (3)	1–2	Gangwon FC (1)	Cheongju Stadium, Cheongju
19:00 (UTC+9)	64' Lee Pung-beom		78' Shin Chang-mu; 90+2' Ishida

14 April 2021	FC Seoul (1)	0–1	Seoul E-Land (2)	Seoul World Cup Stadium, Seoul
19:30 (UTC+9)			84' Leandro

14 April 2021	Gyeongnam FC (2)	3–1 (a.e.t.)	FC Mokpo (3)	Changwon Football Center, Changwon
19:00 (UTC+9)	68' (pen.), 107' Lee Jeong-hyeop; 115' Baek Sung-dong		69' (pen.) Jo Myeong-cheol

14 April 2021	Busan Transportation Corporation (3)	2–2 (a.e.t.) (5–3 p)	Gwangju FC (1)	Gudeok Stadium, Busan
19:00 (UTC+9)	80' Lee Gang-uk; 90+2' Park Seung-uk		53' Song Seung-min; 58' Lee Jun-yong
	Penalties
	Penalty scored		Penalty missed Penalty scored

14 April 2021	Suwon FC (1)	1–1 (a.e.t.) (4–5 p)	Jeonnam Dragons (2)	Suwon Stadium, Suwon
19:00 (UTC+9)	53' (pen.) Yang Dong-hyun		16' Park Hee-seong
	Penalties
	Penalty scored Penalty missed		Penalty missed Penalty scored

== Round of 16 ==
26 May 2021	Jeonbuk Hyundai Motors (1)	0–0 (a.e.t.) (9–10 p)	Yangju Citizen (3)	Jeonju World Cup Stadium, Jeonju
19:00 (UTC+9)
	Penalties
	Penalty scored Penalty missed		Penalty scored Penalty missed

26 May 2021	Suwon Samsung Bluewings (1)	0–0 (a.e.t.) (4–2 p)	FC Anyang (2)	Suwon World Cup Stadium, Suwon
19:00 (UTC+9)
	Penalties
	Penalty scored		Penalty scored Penalty missed

26 May 2021	Daegu FC (1)	2–0	Gimhae City (3)	DGB Daegu Bank Park, Daegu
19:00 (UTC+9)	Edgar 55'; Sergio 72' (pen.)

26 May 2021	Gimcheon Sangmu (2)	3–2 (a.e.t.)	Seongnam FC (1)	Gimcheon Stadium, Gimcheon
19:00 (UTC+9)	Lee Myeong-jae 90+5'; Park Dong-ji 104'; Cho Gue-sung 116'		Kim Hyeon-seong 11' Kang Jae-woo 117'

26 May 2021	Chungnam Asan (2)	1–3	Pohang Steelers (1)	Yi Sun-sin Stadium, Asan
19:00 (UTC+9)	Alves 2' (pen.)		Kang Sang-woo 36'; Lim Sang-hyub 66' Kvesić 90+2'

26 May 2021	Gangwon FC (1)	2–0	Seoul E-Land (2)	Chuncheon Songam Sports Town, Chuncheon
19:00 (UTC+9)	Siladi 7'; Lim Chang-woo 87'

26 May 2021	Ulsan Hyundai (1)	3–0	Gyeongnam FC (2)	Ulsan Munsu Football Stadium, Ulsan
19:00 (UTC+9)	Lee Dong-jun 41'; Kim In-sung 81'; Kim Ji-hyeon 90+3'

26 May 2021	Busan Transportation Corporation (3)	2–2 (a.e.t.) (3–5 p)	Jeonnam Dragons (2)	Gudeok Stadium, Busan
19:00 (UTC+9)	Kim Min-woo 56'; Kwak Seong-chan 62'		Jang Seong-jae 32'; Nnamani 82'
	Penalties
	Penalty scored Penalty missed		Penalty scored

== Quarter-finals ==
The draw was held on 14 June 2021.

11 August 2021	Gangwon FC (1)	2–0	Suwon Samsung Bluewings (1)	Chuncheon Songam Sports Town, Chuncheon
19:00 (UTC+9)	Kim Dae-won 50', 90' (pen.)

11 August 2021	Daegu FC (1)	2–1	Gimcheon Sangmu (2)	DGB Daegu Bank Park, Daegu
19:00 (UTC+9)	Cesinha 88' (pen.); Kim Jin-hyuk 90+1'		Oh Hyeon-gyu 81'

11 August 2021	Ulsan Hyundai (1)	2–0	Yangju Citizen (3)	Ulsan Munsu Football Stadium, Ulsan
19:00 (UTC+9)	Yun Il-lok 22'; Kim Ji-hyeon 74'

11 August 2021	Jeonnam Dragons (2)	1–0	Pohang Steelers (1)	Gwangyang Football Stadium, Gwangyang
19:00 (UTC+9)	Choi Hyo-jin 47'

== Semi-finals ==
27 October 2021	Gangwon FC (1)	0–1	Daegu FC (1)	Chuncheon Songam Sports Town, Chuncheon
19:00 (UTC+9)			Lamas 59'

27 October 2021	Ulsan Hyundai (1)	1–2	Jeonnam Dragons (2)	Ulsan Munsu Football Stadium, Ulsan
19:00 (UTC+9)	Qazaishvili 79' (pen.)		Lee Jong-ho 22'; Jang Soon-hyeok 49'

== Final ==
24 November 2021 First leg	Jeonnam Dragons (2)	0–1	Daegu FC (1)	Gwangyang Football Stadium, Gwangyang
20:00 (UTC+9)			Lamas 26' (pen.)

11 December 2021 Second leg	Daegu FC (1)	3–4 (4–4 agg.)	Jeonnam Dragons (2)	DGB Daegu Bank Park, Daegu
12:30 (UTC+9)	Cesinha 41'; Edgar 51'; Tsubasa 67'		Park Chan-yong 38'; Goh Tae-won 45+1'; Zoteev 56'; Jeong Jae-hee 83'

Jeonnam Dragons won on away goals.

== See also ==
- 2021 in South Korean football
- 2021 K League 1
- 2021 K League 2
- 2021 K3 League
- 2021 K4 League
