= Heo Yong-joon =

South Korean footballer (born 1993)

Personal information
- Date of birth: 8 January 1993 (age 33)
- Place of birth: Yeosu, South Korea
- Height: 1.87 m (6 ft 1 1/2 in)
- Position: Forward

Team information
- Current team: Seoul E-Land
- Number: 70

Youth career
- 2009–2011: Jeonnam Dragons
- 2012–2015: Korea University

Senior career*
Years	Team	Apps	(Gls)
2016–2018	Jeonnam Dragons	86	(16)
2019	Incheon United	10	(0)
2019	→ Pohang Steelers (loan)	15	(1)
2020–2024	Pohang Steelers	55	(13)
2020–2021	→ Sangju / Gimcheon Sangmu (army)	20	(7)
2023	→ Vegalta Sendai (loan)	26	(5)
2025–	Seoul E-Land	20	(2)

International career^{‡}
2011–2013	South Korea U20	12	(3)
2015	South Korea U23	0	(0)
2017	South Korea	1	(0)
- * Club domestic league appearances and goals as of 6 January 2026 ‡ National team caps and goals as of 23 March 2017

- Heo Yong-joon
- Hangul: 허용준
- Hanja: 許熔埈
- RR: Heo Yongjun
- MR: Hŏ Yongjun

Heo Yong-joon (Korean: 허용준; Hanja: 許熔埈; born 8 January 1993) is a South Korean footballer who plays as forward for Seoul E-Land.

== Career ==
Heo joined K League 1 side Jeonnam Dragons in January 2016.

On March 23, 2017, he made his debut as a substitute for the South Korea national team in the 39th minute of the second half of the away match against China in the 3rd round of the Asian qualifiers for the FIFA World Cup in Russia.

== Career statistics ==
As of 28 October 2023

Club	Season	League			Cup		Continental		Other		Total	
Club	Season	Division	Apps	Goals	Apps	Goals	Apps	Goals	Apps	Goals	Apps	Goals
Jeonnam Dragons	2016	K League 1	28	4	3	0	—		—		31	4
Jeonnam Dragons	2017	K League 1	35	3	3	1	—		—		38	4
Jeonnam Dragons	2018	K League 1	23	9	1	0	—		—		24	9
Jeonnam Dragons	Total		86	16	7	1	—		—		93	17
Incheon United	2019	K League 1	10	0	0	0	—		—		10	0
Pohang Steelers (loan)	2019	K League 1	15	1	—		—		—		15	1
Pohang Steelers	2020	K League 1	2	0	—		—		—		2	0
Pohang Steelers	2022	K League 1	30	10	2	4	—		—		32	14
Pohang Steelers	2024	K League 1	0	0	0	0	0	0	—		0	0
Pohang Steelers	Total		47	11	2	4	0	0	—		49	15
Sangju Sangmu / Gimcheon Sangmu (army)	2020	K League 1	2	0	2	1	—		—		4	1
Sangju Sangmu / Gimcheon Sangmu (army)	2021	K League 2	18	7	0	0	—		—		18	7
Sangju Sangmu / Gimcheon Sangmu (army)	Total		20	7	2	1	—		—		22	8
Vegalta Sendai (loan)	2023	J2 League	26	5	1	0	—		—		27	5
Career total			189	39	12	6	0	0	0	0	201	45

== Honours ==
South Korea U20

- AFC U-19 Championship: 2012
