= Ricardo Peres =

Portuguese football manager

Personal information
- Full name: Ricardo Martin Peres
- Date of birth: 3 April 1976 (age 50)
- Place of birth: Portugal

Team information
- Current team: United Arab Emirates (scout)

Managerial career
- Years: Team
- 2004–2009: Sporting CP (goalkeeping coach)
- 2010–2014: Portugal (goalkeeping coach)
- 2016: Cruzeiro (assistant)
- 2016: Cruzeiro (interim)
- 2016–2017: Olympiacos (assistant)
- 2018–2019: Olympiacos U19
- 2019–2020: Casa Pia
- 2020–2022: Busan IPark
- 2023–: United Arab Emirates (scout)

Ricardo Martins Peres (born 3 April 1976) is a Portuguese football manager.

== Managerial career ==
=== Cruzeiro ===
On 1 June 2016, Peres replaced Paulo Bento, of whom he was assistant, in a game of the Campeonato Brasileiro Série A, against Botafogo. Paulo Bento was suspended for this game. Cruzeiro won by 1–0.

=== Casa Pia ===
On 20 December 2019, he was appointed as new manager of Casa Pia.

=== Busan IPark ===
On 25 November 2020, he was appointed as new manager of Busan IPark.

On 31 May 2021, he resigned as manager of Busan IPark.
