= Lee Hyeon-sik =

South Korean footballer

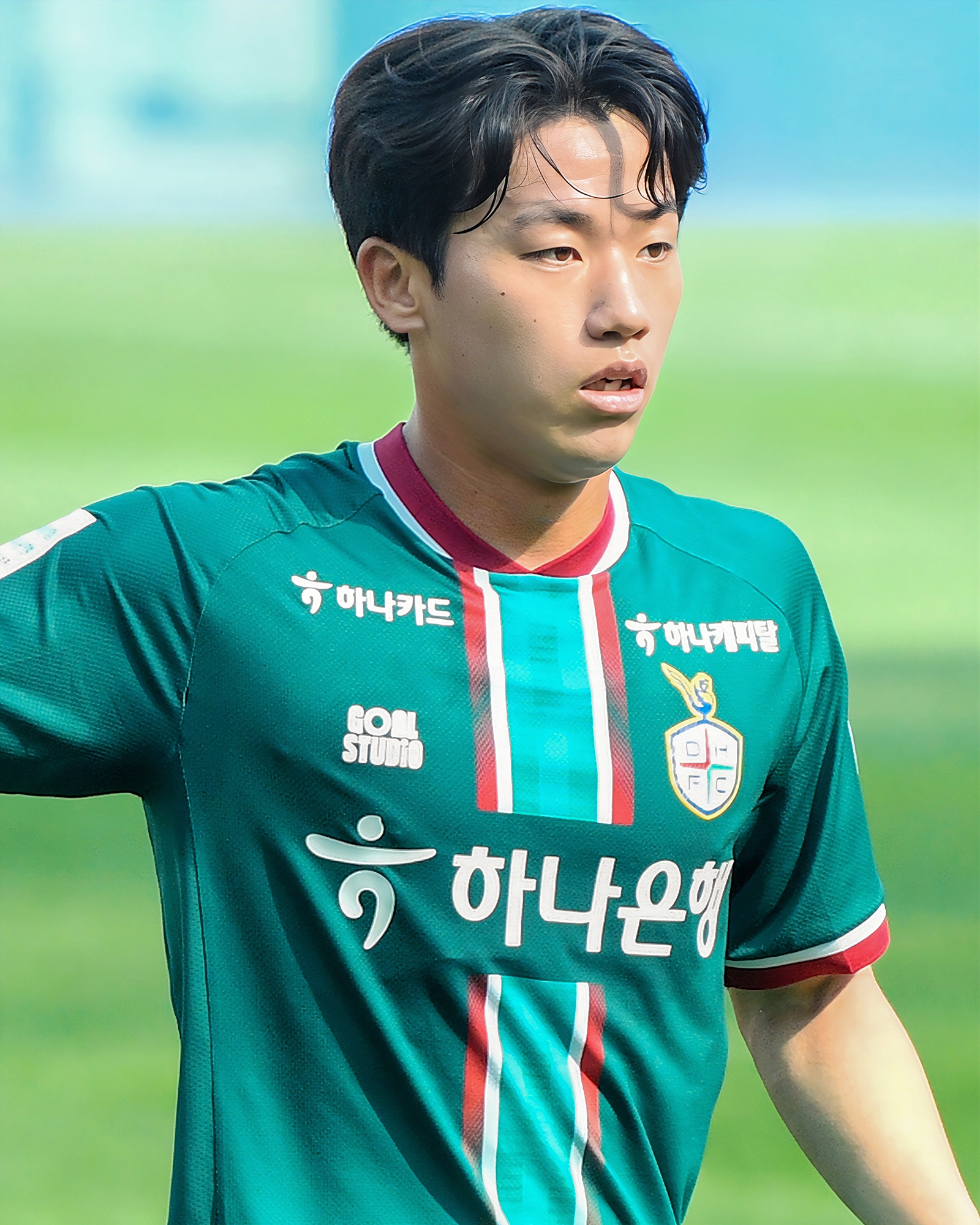
- Lee in 2026

Personal information
- Full name: Lee Hyeon-sik
- Date of birth: 21 March 1996 (age 30)
- Place of birth: South Korea
- Height: 1.75 m (5 ft 9 in)
- Position: Midfielder

Team information
- Current team: Daejeon Hana Citizen
- Number: 20

Youth career
- 2015–2017: Yongin University

Senior career*
Years	Team	Apps	(Gls)
2018–2020	Gangwon FC	79	(7)
2021–	Daejeon Hana Citizen	113	(9)
2025	Gimcheon Sangmu (loan)	1	(0)

International career^{‡}
2017	South Korea Universiade	4	(2)
2020–	South Korea	0	(0)
- * Club domestic league appearances and goals as of 3 August 2026 ‡ National team caps and goals as of 4 October 2020

Lee Hyeon-sik (Korean: 이현식; born 21 March 1996) is a South Korean footballer who plays as midfielder for Daejeon Hana Citizen.

== Career ==
Lee joined K League 1 side Gangwon FC before 2018 season starts.

== Club ==
As of 29 May 2021

Club performance			League		Cup		Continental		Total	
Season	Club	League	Apps	Goals	Apps	Goals	Apps	Goals	Apps	Goals
2018	Gangwon FC	K League 1	27	0	1	0	—		28	0
2019	Gangwon FC	K League 1	32	6	1	1	—		33	7
2020	Gangwon FC	K League 1	20	1	2	1	—		22	2
2021	Daejeon Hana Citizen	K League 2	14	1	1	0	—		15	1
Career total			93	8	5	2	—		98	10
