= Hwang Jun-ho (footballer) =

Korean association football player

Personal information
- Date of birth: 4 May 1998 (age 28)
- Place of birth: South Korea
- Height: 1.90 m (6 ft 3 in)
- Position: Defender

Team information
- Current team: Busan IPark
- Number: 45

Senior career*
Years	Team	Apps	(Gls)
2019–	Busan IPark	66	(4)
Medal record
Men's football
Representing South Korea
FIFA U-20 World Cup
Runner-up	2019 Poland
- * Club domestic league appearances and goals as of 13 December 2023 ‡ National team caps and goals as of 20 February 2021

Hwang Jun-ho (Korean: 황준호; born 4 May 1998) is a South Korean footballer currently playing as a defender for Busan IPark.

== Career statistics ==
=== Club ===
As of 13 December 2023.

Club	Season	League			Cup		Other		Total	
Club	Season	Division	Apps	Goals	Apps	Goals	Apps	Goals	Apps	Goals
Busan IPark	2019	K League 2	15	0	1	0	0	0	16	0
Busan IPark	2020	K League 1	0	0	3	1	0	0	3	1
Busan IPark	2021	K League 2	25	2	2	0	0	0	27	2
Busan IPark	2022	K League 2	19	1	1	0	0	0	20	1
Busan IPark	2023	K League 2	2	1	1	0	0	0	3	1
Career total			61	4	8	1	0	0	69	5
