= Joo Hyeon-woo =

South Korean footballer

Personal information
- Date of birth: 12 September 1990 (age 36)
- Place of birth: South Korea
- Height: 1.73 m (5 ft 8 in)
- Position: Midfielder

Team information
- Current team: FC Anyang
- Number: 99

Youth career
- 2009–2010: Dongshin University
- 2012–2014: Dongshin University

Senior career*
Years	Team	Apps	(Gls)
2015–2017	Gwangju FC	73	(3)
2018–2020	Seongnam FC	61	(3)
2021-	FC Anyang	170	(4)
- * Club domestic league appearances and goals as of 5 January 2026

Joo Hyeon-woo (Korean: 주현우; born 3 November 1990) is a South Korean footballer who plays as midfielder for FC Anyang in K League 1.

== Career ==
He was selected by Gwangju FC in the 2015 K League draft.
