= Samuel Pungi =

Angolan footballer (born 2001)

Personal information
- Full name: Samuel Muanda Mpaka Pungi
- Date of birth: 12 March 2001 (age 25)
- Place of birth: Luanda, Angola
- Height: 1.85 m (6 ft 1 in)
- Position: Centre back

Team information
- Current team: Paju Citizen FC

Youth career
- 2014: Pyeongtaek United FC
- 2015-2017: Chungdam Middle School
- 2018-2020: Cheongdam High School

Senior career*
Years	Team	Apps	(Gls)
2021	Pohang Steelers	0	(0)
2022-	Paju Citizen FC		
- * Club domestic league appearances and goals as of 11 February 2022

Samuel Muanda Mpaka Pungi (born 12 March 2001), is an Angolan footballer who plays for Paju Citizen FC as a centre back.

== Youth career ==
Samuel started playing football in 2007 at Pyeongtaek United. He began his career as a professional football player at Chungdam Middle school in the same city.

Since his high school year, he went to Jinju high school football team, which is a youth team of Gyeongnam FC. However, he later returned to Pyeongtaek and joined Chungdam high school football team.

== Club career ==
Samuel joined Pohang Steelers of K League 1 on 4 December 2020. However, he was not able to play for the official matches as his naturalisation process kept being delayed.

For the 2022 season, he left Pohang Steelers and joined Paju Citizen FC of K3 League.

== Personal life ==
Samuel immigrated from Angola to South Korea with his family in 2007 as a refugee. He took naturalisation test in 2021, but the result announcement has been delayed due to COVID-19 pandemic.
