= Kim Tae-wan =

South Korean footballer (born 1971)

Personal information
- Date of birth: 1 June 1971 (age 55)
- Place of birth: Busan, South Korea
- Position: Defender

Team information
- Current team: Gimcheon Sangmu (manager)

Youth career
- 1990–1993: Hongik University

Senior career*
Years	Team	Apps	(Gls)
1994	Hanil Bank		
1995–1996	Sangmu		
1997–2001	Daejeon Citizen	116	(5)

Managerial career
- 2002: Sangmu (fitness coach)
- 2003–2015: Gwangju Sangmu (first team coach)
- 2011: Sangju Sangmu (caretaker)
- 2016: Sangju Sangmu (assistant)
- 2017–2020: Sangju Sangmu
- 2021–: Gimcheon Sangmu
- * Club domestic league appearances and goals as of 1 January 2017

Kim Tae-wan (Korean: 김태완; Hanja: 金泰完; born 1 June 1971) is a retired South Korean footballer and currently manager. He is a manager of Sangju Sangmu in K League 1.

== Career ==
Kim Tae-wan was promoted to the manager of Sangju Sangmu from assistant manager after the former manager Cho Jin-ho left the team.
