= Han Kook-young =

South Korean footballer (born 1990)

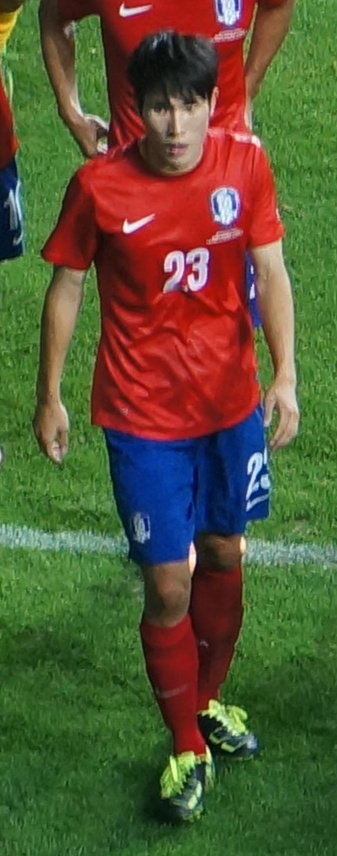
- 대한민국 (Rep. of Korea) vs. 아이티 (Haiti) 2013.09.06

Personal information
- Date of birth: 19 April 1990 (age 36)
- Place of birth: Seoul, South Korea
- Height: 1.83 m (6 ft 0 in)
- Position: Defensive midfielder

Team information
- Current team: Daegu FC
- Number: 8

Youth career
- 2009: Soongsil University

Senior career*
Years	Team	Apps	(Gls)
2010–2013	Shonan Bellmare	106	(0)
2014	Kashiwa Reysol	9	(0)
2014–2016	Qatar SC	47	(8)
2016–2017	Al-Gharafa	26	(2)
2017–2024	Gangwon FC	154	(6)
2024–2025	Jeonbuk Hyundai Motors	38	(0)
2026–	Daegu FC	8	(0)

International career^{‡}
2007	South Korea U-17	5	(0)
2011–2012	South Korea U-23	9	(0)
2013–2017	South Korea	41	(0)
Medal record
Men's football
Representing South Korea
AFC Asian Cup
Runner-up	2015 Australia
- * Club domestic league appearances and goals as of 5 August 2026 ‡ National team caps and goals as of 14 June 2017

- Han Kook-young
- Hangul: 한국영
- Hanja: 韓國榮
- RR: Han Gukyeong
- MR: Han Kugyŏng

Han Kook-young (Korean: 한국영; Hanja: 韓國榮; Korean pronunciation: [han.ɡu.ɡjʌŋ] or [han] [ku.ɡjʌŋ]; born 19 April 1990) is a South Korean football player who plays for Daegu FC.

== Club statistics ==
As of 1 November 2014

Club performance			League		Cup		League Cup		Continental		Other		Total	
Season	Club	League	Apps	Goals	Apps	Goals	Apps	Goals	Apps	Goals	Apps	Goals	Apps	Goals
Japan			League		Emperor's Cup		J.League Cup		Asia		Other		Total	
2010	Shonan Bellmare	J1 League	19	0	—		5	0	—		—		24	0
2011	Shonan Bellmare	J2 League	30	0	2	0	—		—		—		32	0
2012	Shonan Bellmare	J2 League	27	0	1	0	—		—		—		28	0
2013	Shonan Bellmare	J1 League	30	0	0	0	2	0	—		—		32	0
2014	Kashiwa Reysol	J1 League	9	0	0	0	2	0	—		—		11	0
Qatar			League		Emir of Qatar Cup		Qatari Stars Cup		Asia		Other^{1}		Total	
2014–15	Qatar SC	Qatar Stars League	21	4	0	0	0	0	—		—		21	4
2015–16	Qatar SC	Qatar Stars League	26	4	0	0	0	0	—		—		26	4
Totals	Japan		115	0	3	0	9	0	—	—	—	—	127	0
Totals	Qatar		47	8	0	0	0	0	—	—	—	—	47	8
Career totals			162	8	3	0	9	0	—	—	—	—	174	8

^{1}Other tournaments include Sheikh Jassem Cup and Qatar Crown Prince Cup
