= Masatoshi Ishida (footballer) =

Japanese association football player

Masatoshi Ishida 石田 雅俊
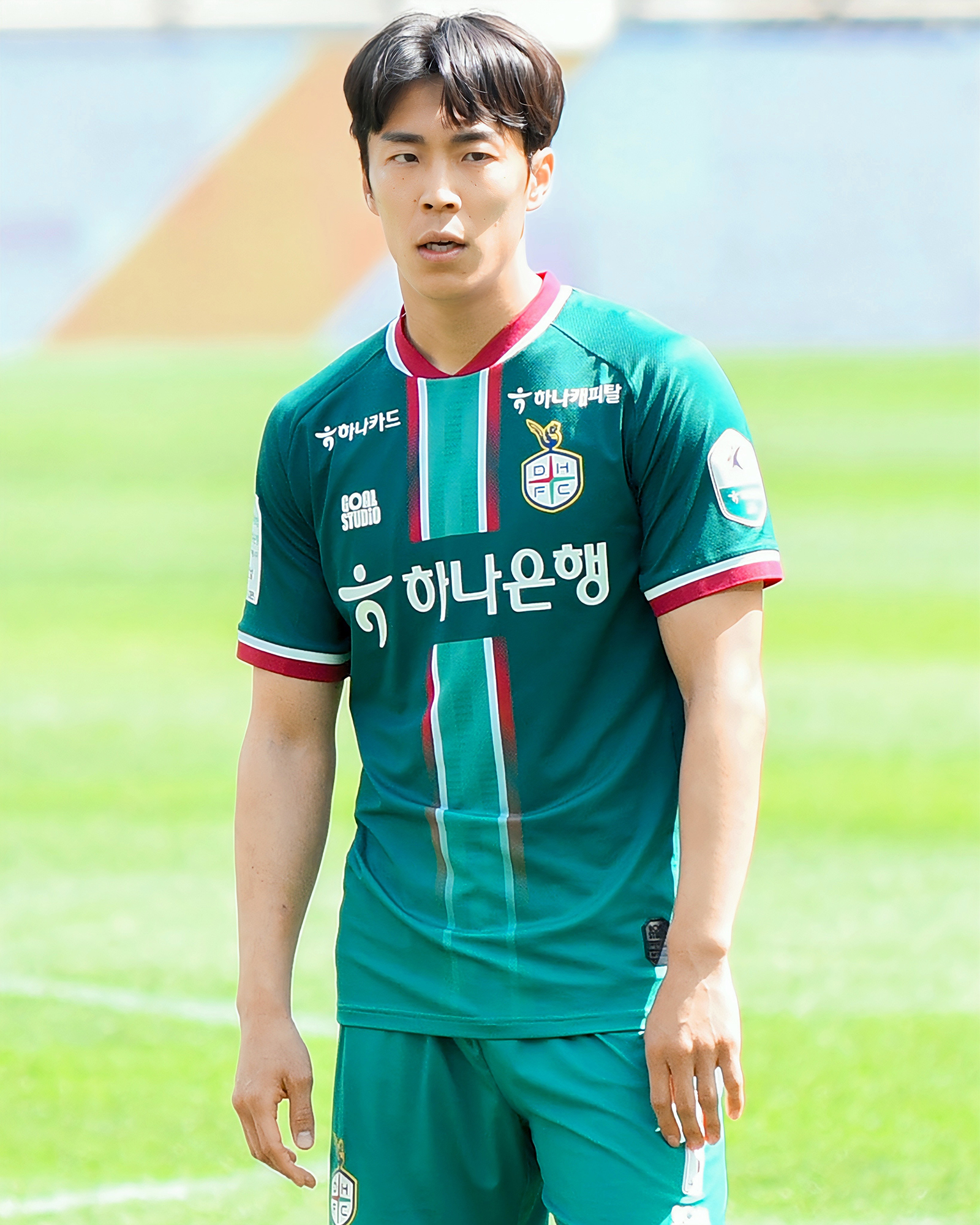
- Ishida in 2026

Personal information
- Full name: Masatoshi Ishida
- Date of birth: May 4, 1995 (age 31)
- Place of birth: Narashino, Japan
- Height: 1.78 m (5 ft 10 in)
- Position: Midfielder

Team information
- Current team: Daejeon Hana Citizen
- Number: 7

Youth career
- Vivaio Funabashi
- –2007: Aichi FC
- 2008–2010: Nagoya Grampus
- 2011–2013: Ichiritsu Funabashi High School

Senior career*
Years	Team	Apps	(Gls)
2014–2018	Kyoto Sanga	19	(2)
2014–2015	→ J. League U-22 (loan)	12	(2)
2016	→ SC Sagamihara (loan)	8	(0)
2017	→ Thespakusatsu Gunma (loan)	26	(0)
2018	→ Azul Claro Numazu (loan)	13	(1)
2019	Ansan Greeners	24	(9)
2020	Suwon FC	27	(10)
2021	Gangwon FC	9	(0)
2021	→ Daejeon Hana Citizen (loan)	15	(9)
2022–2023	Daejeon Hana Citizen	58	(16)
2024	Jubilo Iwata	3	(0)
2024–	Daejeon Hana Citizen	51	(15)
- * Club domestic league appearances and goals as of 3 August 2026

Masatoshi Ishida (石田 雅俊, Ishida Masatoshi; born May 4, 1995) is a Japanese footballer who plays for Daejeon Hana Citizen as a midfielder.

== Career ==
=== Kyoto Sanga ===
Ishida made his league debut against Hokkaido Consadole Sapporo on 10 August 2014.

=== Loan to Thespakusatsu Gunma ===
Ishida made his league debut against Shonan Bellmare on 4 March 2017.

=== Loan to Azul Claro Numazu ===
Ishida made his league debut against Gainare Tottori on 25 August 2018.

=== Suwon FC ===
On 7 February 2020, Ishida was announced at Suwon.

=== Gangwon FC ===
On 7 January 2021, Ishida was announced at Gangwon FC.

=== Loan to Daejeon Hana Citizen ===
On 25 June 2021, Ishida was announced at Daejeon Hana Citizen. He suffered a ligament rupture that kept him out for 6 weeks. Ishida scored his first professional hattrick against Ansan Greeners on 10 October 2021.

At the end of the season, Ishida was part of the Best Eleven team.

=== Second spell at Daejeon Hana Citizen ===
Ishida made his league debut against Gwangju FC on 27 February 2022.

=== Jubilo Iwata ===
On 5 January 2024, Ishida was announced at Jubilo Iwata.

=== Third spell at Daejeon Hana Citizen ===
On 27 June 2024, Ishida was announced at Daejeon Hana Citizen.

== Style of play ==
He prefers to play as a central attacking midfielder, but he can also play as a left winger or a second striker.

== Club statistics ==
As of 23 February 2018.

Appearances and goals by club, season and competition
Club performance			League		National cup		Total	
Season	Club	League	Apps	Goals	Apps	Goals	Apps	Goals
Japan			League		Emperor's Cup		Total	
2014	Kyoto Sanga	J2 League	7	2	1	0	8	2
2015	Kyoto Sanga	J2 League	5	0	1	0	6	0
2016	Kyoto Sanga	J2 League	7	0	0	0	7	0
2016	SC Sagamihara	J3 League	8	0	0	0	8	0
2017	Thespakusatsu Gunma	J2 League	26	0	2	1	28	1
Total			53	2	4	1	57	3
