= Daejeon Hana Citizen =

- Full name: Daejeon Hana Citizen Football Club 대전 하나 시티즌 축구단
- Short name: DHFC
- Founded: 1997; 29 years ago
- Ground: Daejeon World Cup Stadium
- Capacity: 40,535
- Owner: Hana Financial Group Football Club Foundation
- Chairman: Jeong Tae-hee
- Manager: Hwang Sun-hong
- League: K League 1
- 2025: K League 1, 2nd of 12
- Website: www.dhcfc.kr
| Home colours | Away colours |

Daejeon Hana Citizen FC (Korean: 대전 하나 시티즌 FC) is a South Korean professional football team based in Daejeon, competing in K League 1, the top tier of the South Korean football league system. At the time of its foundation in 1997, Daejeon was the first community-owned club in South Korea, not being owned by any company. The club first entered the K League in the 1997 season, finishing in seventh place. In spite of a limited budget, Daejeon won the 2001 Korean FA Cup. It has not achieved sustained success in the K League, historically occupying the middle and lower reaches of the standings each season and spending long spells in the second-tier K League 2.

On 24 December 2019, Hana Financial Group bought the club's operating rights and gave the club its current name.

== History ==
=== First steps into the K League (1997) ===
Following the foundation of the professional football league (the Korean Super League, reorganized as the K League in 1998) in Korea, there were few league matches held in Daejeon, and such matches that were held were played by visiting clubs. The absence of a local team in the league made it difficult for the citizens of Daejeon to identify with any particular team. However, in 1996 a plan to establish 'Daejeon Citizen' – their own local community club – was unveiled, which meant the citizens of Daejeon would have their own team to support in the league. Daejeon was the first club that did not belong to a major company, and would play in the Daejeon Hanbat Stadium.

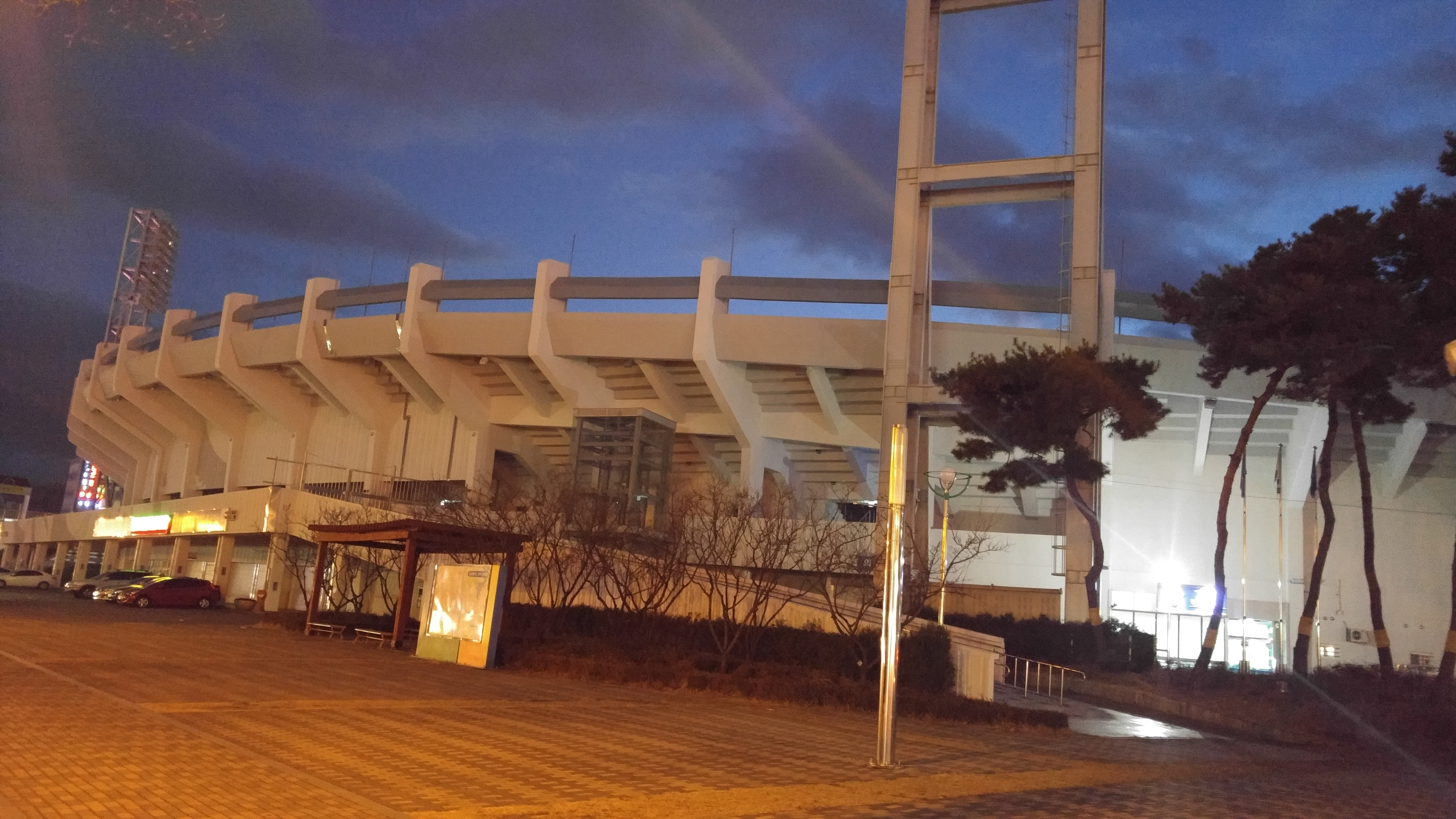
The Hanbat Football Stadium, where Daejeon Citizen played its games upon founding

Kim Ki-bok was appointed the first manager of Daejeon Citizen. With high expectations, Daejeon took their first step in the K League in 1997, opening their season with a match vs. Ulsan Hyundai Horang-i. However, the results achieved in their first season did not live up to expectations. Although the club placed seventh in the league, ahead of Cheonan Ilhwa Chunma, Anyang LG Cheetahs, and Bucheon SK, they won only three matches out of 18 games.

=== The IMF Crisis (1998–2000) ===
In 1998, a major economic crisis hit the South Korean economy. Daejeon Citizen did not escape this crisis unscathed. The main board of Daejeon consisted of 4 groups – Kyeryong Construction Industrial, Dong-A Construction, DongYang Department Store and Chungcheong Bank. But as a consequence of the IMF crisis, three of the four groups went bankrupt, leaving Kyeryong as the only survivor of the original board. There was a subsequent impact on the level of financial and management support provided to the club. This made for a particularly difficult 1998 season. Daejeon once again won only three games, placing ninth.

In the following season, 1999, Daejeon improved their winning record to six victories. However, changes in the K League structure since the previous year meant that an extra 9 games were played, 27 in total, from the previous season. There were a total of 18 losses, the worst in the league. Despite this, Daejeon improved to eighth place. For the 2000 season, Daejeon maintained its eighth place standing in the league.

=== On the verge of disappearing (2001–2002) ===
For the 2001 season, Lee Tae-ho was appointed manager, and promptly took Daejeon Citizen's first piece of silverware, leading Daejeon to victory in the season's FA Cup. The decisive goal of the FA Cup final came from Kim Eun-jung, which gave the team a one-nil victory over the Pohang Steelers. Due to this win, Daejeon also qualified for the 2002–03 AFC Champions League for the first time. This helped compensate for their poor performance in the K League, in which they finished last.

South Korea was a co-host of the 2002 FIFA World Cup, with Daejeon as one of the host cities. The city constructed a brand new stadium for the World Cup, and following the conclusion of the tournament, Daejeon Citizen changed stadiums. The shift from their former stadium, Daejeon Hanbat Stadium, to Daejeon World Cup Stadium, meant the club not only benefited from the new facilities, but also the greater capacity of the stadium. Daejeon's poor league performance from the previous year was carried into the 2002 season, and the club finished last again with only a single victory. Lee Tae-ho eventually resigned taking responsibility for the poor results. However, more creditable results were achieved in the AFC Champions League. Although they did not proceed beyond the group phase, they did finish second in the group, defeating both Shanghai Shenhua and Kashima Antlers. Their only loss was to the eventual group winner and overall runner-up, Thai club BEC Tero Sasana.

In other changes for 2002, the key financial supporter of the club – Kyeryong, which with their support ensured that Daejeon Citizen would survive the IMF crisis – declared that they would withdraw from the club's board. Daejeon City Hall decided to give financial support to the club. This ensured the club would survive to participate in the 2003 season.

=== Football Special City (2003–2008) ===
The 2003 season proved to be memorable for Daejeon fans. Choi Yun-kyum, previously coach at Bucheon SK, was appointed manager to replace Lee Tae-ho who had resigned in the wake of the club's 2002 season. Choi promptly inspired the team and completely changed its dynamics by implementing the 4–3–3 formation. The outcome was a near miraculous recovery from 2002, and he, together with Daejeon Citizen, coined the catchphrase "Miracle 2003". Daejeon Citizen finished the season in sixth place, its best finish ever in the league, having won 18 out of 44 games. Its sixth place was even more meritorious as the K League had expanded to twelve teams, with Daegu FC and Gwangju Sangmu Phoenix entering the competition for the first time.

The club's popularity flourished at this time, leading the city of Daejeon to be called "Football Special City" (축구특별시). Its home game attendance rose to 19,000, and a record home attendance of nearly 44,000 was set.

It proved difficult for the club to maintain its performance into 2004. A lack of striking power at the attacking end of the field left the club with the worst offensive record of all the clubs in the K League, scoring 18 goals in 24 games. Daejeon slipped to eleventh place out of thirteen teams. However, they did make it to the semi-finals of the FA Cup, going down to eventual runners-up, Bucheon SK. Daejeon also finished as runners-up in the Hauzen Cup, behind only Seongnam Ilhwa Chunma.

The lack of penetration continued to be problematic into the 2005 season, with the club maintaining its record as the worst offensive side in the league, with only 19 goals scored in 24 games. However, superb defence saw only 20 goals conceded (best defensive record in the league) ensuring that Daejeon finished seventh in the regular season, having lost only six games. In the 2005 cup competitions, the FA Cup and the League Cup, Daejeon failed to progress to the quarter-final stage. Despite early success, the club had once again had a poor showing in 2006.

In the 2007 season, Daejeon achieved a highly unlikely qualification for the playoff phase of the K League following a 1–0 win over Suwon Samsung Bluewings which ensured a superior goal difference to FC Seoul, with whom Daejeon finished equal on points. The win over Suwon was Daejeon's fifth consecutive victory and ultimately enabled them to qualify for the championship playoffs for the first time in their history. When Kim Ho took over from previous manager Choi Yun-kyum in the mid-season, Daejeon were sitting in eleventh place. However, under the guidance of their coach, and with good performances from Denilson, who scored 14 goals, and one of Korea's best technical players, Ko Jong-soo, they eventually qualified for the play-offs. They were ultimately beaten by Ulsan Hyundai in the first phase of the play-offs.

The club finished the 2008 season second from last, heralding the end of its golden period.

=== Instability and decline (2009–2019) ===
Daejeon continued with mediocre to poor league results in the 2009 and 2010 seasons, finishing 9th and 13th, respectively. The club briefly topped the league in 2011 with striker Wagner Querino in great form. However, the K League match-fixing scandal hit hard, with multiple players resigning or being banned and manager Wang Sun-jae resigning. Former South Korean national team midfielder Yoo Sang-chul became head coach to help stabilize the club and avoid last place. The team continued to struggle in the following seasons, finishing 13th in 2012 and last in 2013, resulting in relegation.

Daejeon won promotion back to the top tier, winning the 2014 K League Challenge. However, the club was immediately relegated back to the second division after finishing last in the 2015 K League Classic. The club would spend the next several seasons in K League Challenge/K League 2 while failing to advance past the round of 16 in the FA Cup.

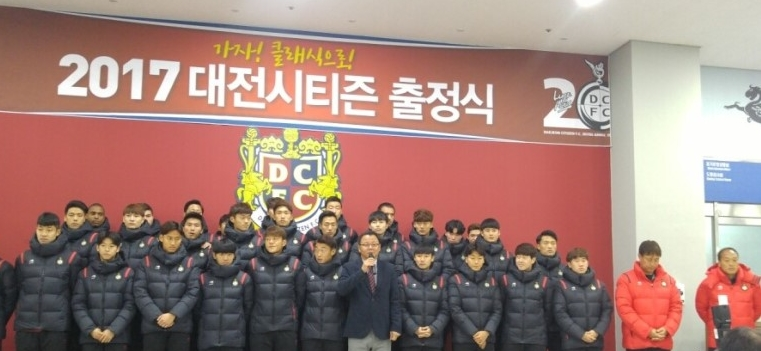
Daejeon Citizen players in 2017

=== Hana takeover (2019–present) ===
In late 2019, Hana Financial Group officially acquired the club, transitioning Daejeon Citizen from a public to a corporate club and renaming it Daejeon Hana Citizen. Hana's investment into the team led to improved results, with the newly renamed DHFC winning promotion to K League 1 after a runners-up finish in the 2022 K League 2. Attendance soared in their first season back in top flight, with the club recording an average attendance of nearly 13000 in the 2023 K League 1 season thanks to the effects of promotion, removal of COVID-19 restrictions, and the bright performances of new stars such as Bae Jun-ho, who would eventually transfer to EFL Championship side Stoke City.

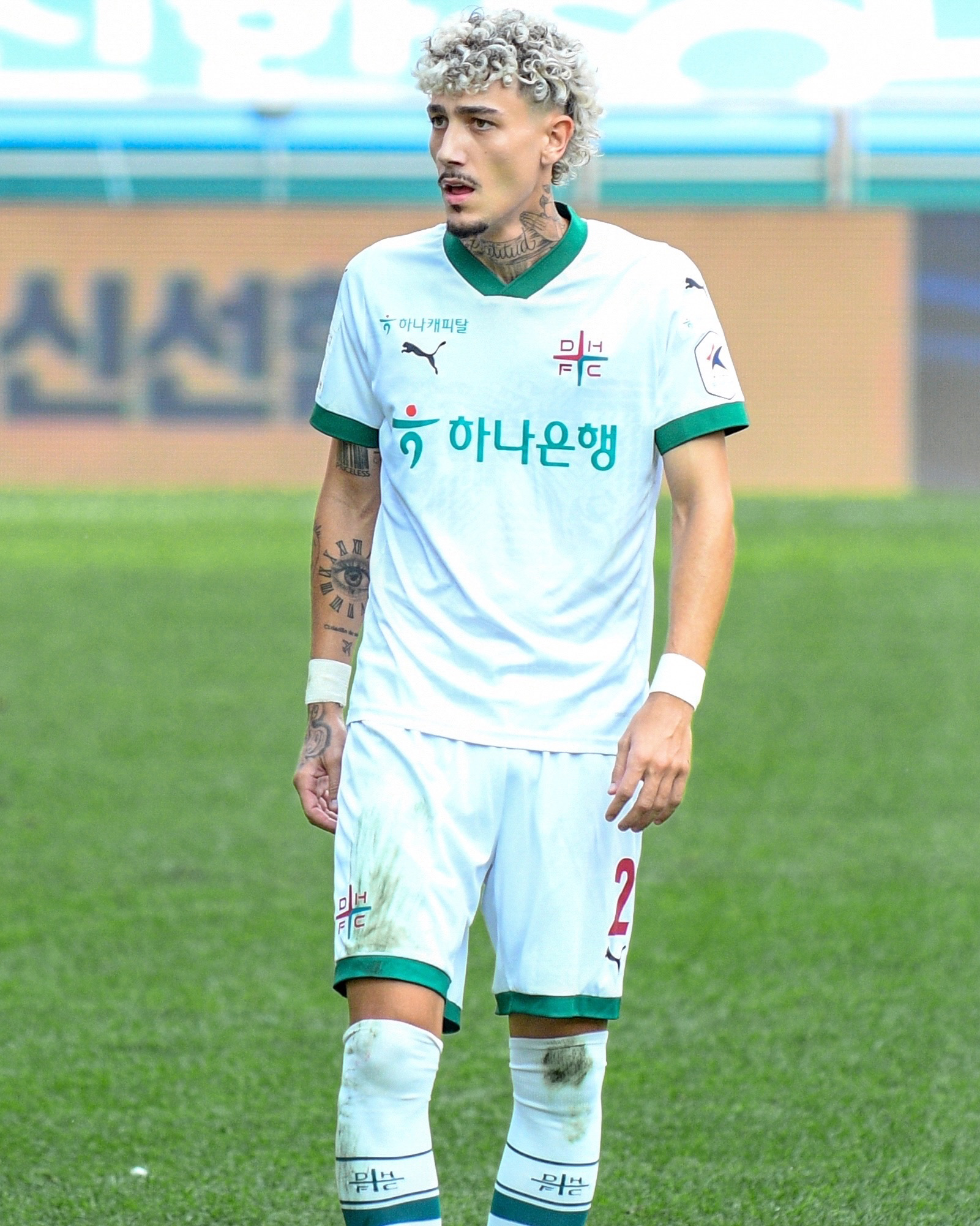
Daejeon's Victor Bobsin in a match against FC Seoul in 2024

In the 2024 K League 1 season, former South Korean national team striker Hwang Sun-hong was appointed head coach, and the club managed to avoid relegation play-offs. After a busy winter transfer market, they began the 2025 season very strongly, being first in the league with 23 points after 11 matches with a particularly good showing by newly acquired striker Joo Min-kyu. The club's young attacker Yoon Do-young signed a transfer agreement to join Premier League side Brighton & Hove Albion in the summer for a club record fee of 3.8 billion won. Under Hwang, Daejeon finished as runners-up behind Jeonbuk Hyundai Motors in 2025, the club's highest-ever finish.

== Stadium ==
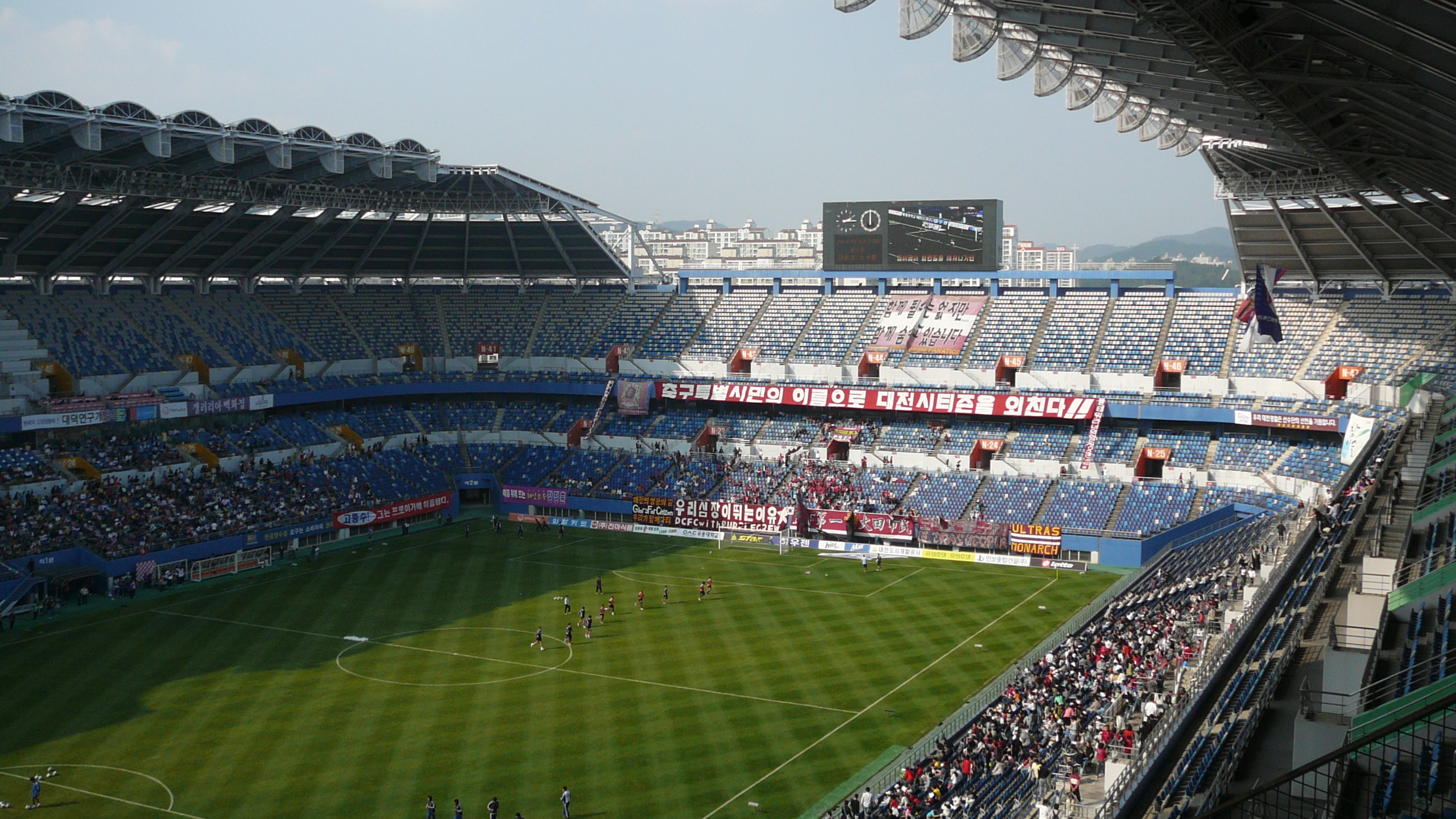
View of the Daejeon World Cup Stadium

Since the 2002 K League season, which kicked off within a few weeks of the conclusion of the 2002 FIFA Football World Cup, Daejeon Hana Citizen have played their home games at Daejeon World Cup Stadium, completed in 2001 and nicknamed the "Purple Arena". The stadium hosted two group games of the World Cup, as well as the round of 16 match between South Korea and Italy. It has a seating capacity of 40,535, making it one of the largest stadiums in the country.

The last four home games of the 2014 season were played at the club's previous stadium, the Daejeon Hanbat Stadium, while maintenance work was carried out at the World Cup Stadium. The club returned to the World Cup Stadium in the 2015 season.

The team's club house (training center) is the Deogam Football Center, based in the city's Daedeok District.

== Club culture ==
Daejeon Lovers (대전 러버스) are DHFC's largest supporters' group. The club's anthem is called "Son of Daejeon" (대전의 아들). Daejeon supporters take special pride in the successful overseas talent produced by the club, such as Daejeon native Hwang In-beom of Feyenoord and Bae Jun-ho of Stoke City.

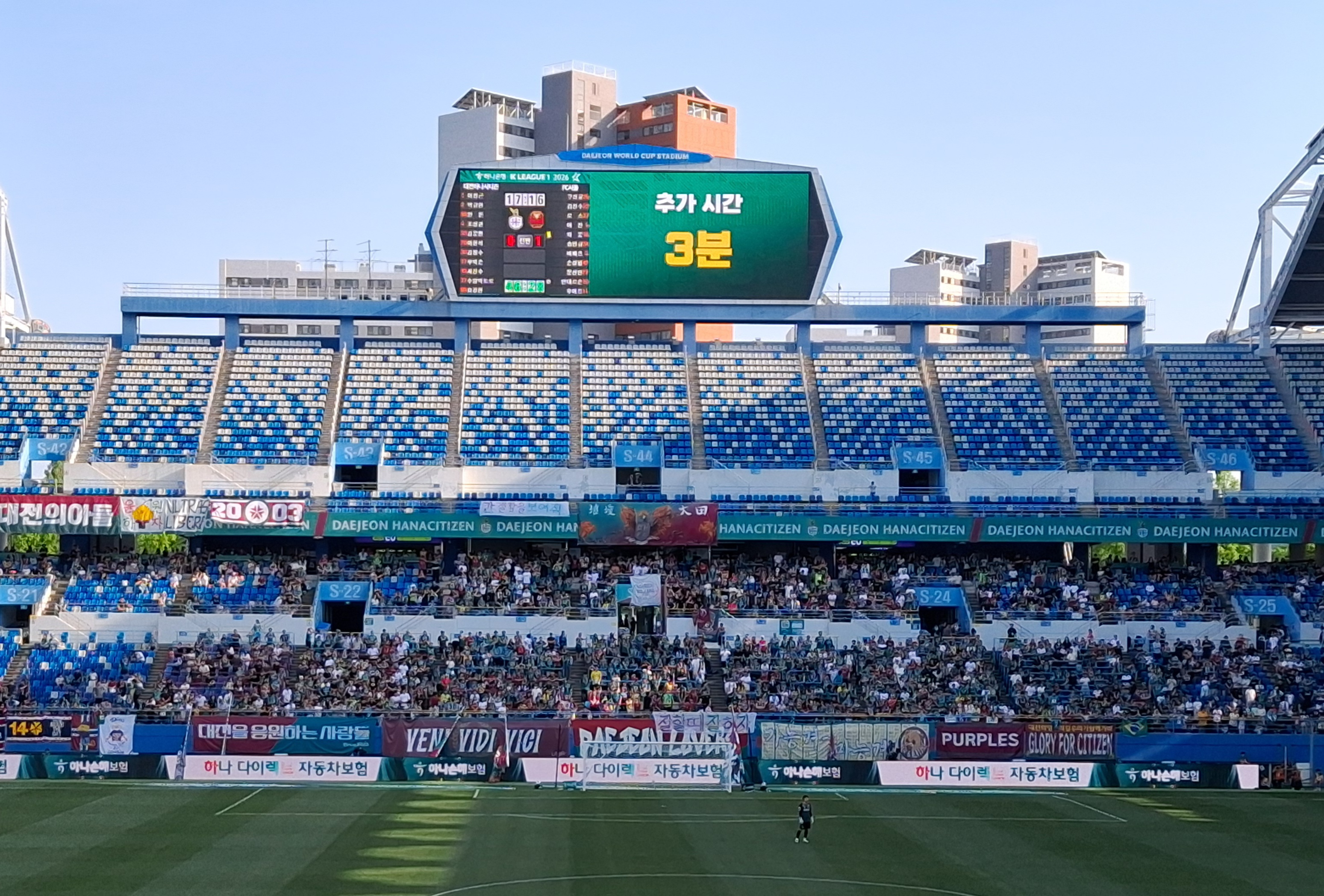
Daejeon supporters at the Daejeon World Cup Stadium

In the opening match of the 2025 K League 1 season, supporters of both Daejeon and Pohang Steelers paid tribute at the Pohang Steel Yard to Kim Ha-neul, a young Daejeon Lovers member who was recently murdered.

DHFC shares strong rivalries with Suwon Samsung Bluewings and Incheon United.

== Players ==
=== Current squad ===
As of 12 November 2026

Note: Flags indicate national team as defined under FIFA eligibility rules; some limited exceptions apply. Players may hold more than one non-FIFA nationality.

| No. | Pos. | Nation | Player |
|---|---|---|---|
| 1 | GK | KOR | Lee Chang-geun |
| 2 | DF | KOR | Park Kyu-hyun |
| 3 | DF | KOR | Kim Min-deok |
| 4 | DF | KOR | Cho Sung-gwon |
| 5 | DF | KOR | Lim Jong-eun |
| 6 | DF | KOR | Kang Yoon-sung |
| 7 | FW | JPN | Masatoshi Ishida |
| 8 | MF | BRA | Victor Bobsin |
| 9 | FW | BRA | Diogo |
| 10 | FW | KOR | Joo Min-kyu (captain) |
| 11 | MF | KOR | Um Won-sang |
| 13 | DF | KOR | Kim Jin-ya |
| 14 | MF | KOR | Kim Jun-beom |
| 16 | DF | KOR | Lee Myung-jae |
| 17 | MF | SWE | Gustav Ludwigson |
| 19 | FW | KOR | Seo Jin-su |
| 20 | MF | KOR | Lee Hyeon-sik |
| 22 | DF | KOR | Oh Jae-suk |

| No. | Pos. | Nation | Player |
|---|---|---|---|
| 23 | DF | KOR | Seo Young-jae |
| 25 | GK | KOR | Lee Joon-seo |
| 26 | DF | KOR | Lee Jung-taek |
| 27 | FW | KOR | Jeong Jae-hee |
| 29 | FW | KOR | Moon Geon-ho |
| 30 | MF | KOR | Kim Bong-soo |
| 31 | GK | KOR | Kim Min-soo |
| 33 | DF | KOR | Kim Moon-hwan |
| 37 | FW | KOR | Koo Hun-min |
| 40 | GK | KOR | Lee Kyung-tae |
| 41 | MF | KOR | Park Byung-chan |
| 42 | DF | KOR | Lim Yoo-seok |
| 44 | MF | KOR | Lee Soon-min (vice-captain) |
| 45 | DF | KOR | Ha Chang-rae (vice-captain) |
| 70 | MF | KOR | Kim Hyeon-ug |
| 77 | FW | BRA | João Victor |
| 98 | DF | AZE | Anton Kryvotsyuk (vice-captain) |
| 99 | FW | KOR | Yu Kang-hyun |

=== Out on loan ===
Note: Flags indicate national team as defined under FIFA eligibility rules; some limited exceptions apply. Players may hold more than one non-FIFA nationality.

| No. | Pos. | Nation | Player |
|---|---|---|---|
| — | DF | KOR | Kim Hyun-woo (at Gimcheon Sangmu for military service) |
| — | DF | KOR | Kim Min-woo (at Suwon Samsung Bluewings) |
| — | DF | KOR | Lim Dug-keun (at Gimcheon Sangmu for military service) |
| — | DF | KOR | Park Jin-seong (at Gimcheon Sangmu for military service) |
| — | DF | KOR | Yeo Seung-won (at Incheon United) |

| No. | Pos. | Nation | Player |
|---|---|---|---|
| — | MF | KOR | Kim Gyeong-hwan (at Namyangju FC for military service) |
| — | MF | KOR | Kim Han-seo (at Yongin FC) |
| — | MF | KOR | Lee Jun-gyu (at Gimhae FC 2008) |
| — | FW | KOR | Kim Hyeon-oh (at Gyeongnam FC) |
| — | FW | KOR | Kim In-gyun (at Gimcheon Sangmu for military service) |

=== Retired numbers ===
18 – Kim Eun-jung
21 – Choi Eun-sung

== Managers ==
| No. | Name | From | To | Season(s) |
|---|---|---|---|---|
| 1 | (South Korea) Kim Ki-bok | 1996/11/21 | 2000/10/25 | 1997–2000 |
| 2 | (South Korea) Lee Tae-ho | 2000/10/26 | 2002/12/30 | 2001–2002 |
| 3 | (South Korea) Choi Yun-kyum | 2003/01/08 | 2007/06/30 | 2003–2007 |
| 4 | (South Korea) Kim Ho | 2007/07/13 | 2009/06/26 | 2007–2009 |
| C | (South Korea) Wang Sun-Jae | 2009/06/27 | 2009/10/26 | 2009 |
| 5 | (South Korea) Wang Sun-Jae | 2009/10/27 | 2011/07/02 | 2009–2011 |
| C | (South Korea) Shin Jin-won | 2011/07/03 | 2011/07/16 | 2011 |
| 6 | (South Korea) Yoo Sang-chul | 2011/07/20 | 2012/12/01 | 2011–2012 |
| 7 | (South Korea) Kim In-wan | 2012/12/05 | 2013/10/02 | 2013 |
| C | (South Korea) Cho Jin-ho | 2013/10/03 | 2014/05/08 | 2013–2014 |
| 8 | (South Korea) Cho Jin-ho | 2014/05/08 | 2015/05/20 | 2014–2015 |
| C | (Canada) Michael Kim | 2015/05/21 | 2015/05/31 | 2015 |
| 9 | (South Korea) Choi Moon-sik | 2015/05/28 | 2016/10/30 | 2015–2016 |
| 10 | (South Korea) Lee Young-ik | 2016/11/17 | 2017/08/31 | 2017 |
| C | (South Korea) Kim Jong-hyun | 2017/08/31 | 2017/10/29 | 2017 |
| 11 | (South Korea) Ko Jong-soo | 2017/12/01 | 2019/05/23 | 2018–2019 |
| C | (South Korea) Park Chul | 2019/05/23 | 2019/06/30 | 2019 |
| 12 | (South Korea) Lee Heung-sil | 2019/07/02 | 2019/12/16 | 2019 |
| 13 | (South Korea) Hwang Sun-hong | 2020/01/04 | 2020/09/08 | 2020 |
| C | (South Korea) Kang Chul | 2020/09/08 | 2020/09/17 | 2020 |
| C | (South Korea) Cho Min-kook | 2020/09/18 | 2020/11/25 | 2020 |
| 14 | (South Korea) Lee Min-sung | 2020/12/09 | 2024/05/21 | 2021–2024 |
| C | (South Korea) Jung Kwang-seok | 2024/05/21 | 2024/06/02 | 2024 |
| 15 | (South Korea) Hwang Sun-hong | 2024/06/03 | present | 2024– |

== Honours ==
=== League ===
- K League 1
  - Runners-up: 2025
- K League 2
  - Winners: 2014
  - Runners-up: 2021, 2022

=== Cups ===
- Korean FA Cup
  - Winners: 2001
- Korean League Cup
  - Runners-up: 2004
- K League Super Cup
  - Runners-up: 2002, 2026

== Season-by-season records ==
=== Domestic record ===
| Season | Division | Tms. | Pos. | Korea Cup |
|---|---|---|---|---|
| 1997 | 1 | 10 | 7 | Round of 16 |
| 1998 | 1 | 10 | 9 | Round of 16 |
| 1999 | 1 | 10 | 8 | Round of 16 |
| 2000 | 1 | 10 | 8 | First round |
| 2001 | 1 | 10 | 10 | Winners |
| 2002 | 1 | 10 | 10 | Semi-finals |
| 2003 | 1 | 12 | 6 | Quarter-finals |
| 2004 | 1 | 13 | 11 | Semi-finals |
| 2005 | 1 | 13 | 8 | Round of 16 |
| 2006 | 1 | 14 | 10 | Round of 16 |
| 2007 | 1 | 14 | 6 | Round of 16 |
| 2008 | 1 | 14 | 13 | Round of 32 |
| 2009 | 1 | 15 | 9 | Semi-finals |
| 2010 | 1 | 15 | 13 | Semi-finals |
| 2011 | 1 | 16 | 15 | Round of 16 |
| 2012 | 1 | 16 | 13 | Quarter-finals |
| 2013 | 1 | 14 | 14 ↓ | Round of 32 |
| 2014 | 2 | 10 | 1 ↑ | Round of 32 |
| 2015 | 1 | 12 | 12 ↓ | Round of 16 |
| 2016 | 2 | 11 | 7 | Round of 16 |
| 2017 | 2 | 10 | 10 | Round of 16 |
| 2018 | 2 | 10 | 4 | Third round |
| 2019 | 2 | 10 | 9 | Third round |
| 2020 | 2 | 10 | 4 | Round of 16 |
| 2021 | 2 | 10 | 3 | Third round |
| 2022 | 2 | 11 | 2 ↑ | Second round |
| 2023 | 1 | 12 | 8 | Round of 16 |
| 2024 | 1 | 12 | 8 | Round of 16 |
| 2025 | 1 | 12 | 2 | Round of 16 |

Colour key

| Winners | Runners-up | Promoted ↑ | Relegated ↓ |

=== Continental record ===
All results list Daejeon's goal tally first.

==== AFC Champions League ====
| Season | Round | Opposition | Home | Away | Agg. |
|---|---|---|---|---|---|
| 2003 | Third qualifying round | (Macau) Monte Carlo | 3–0 | 5–1 | 8–1 |
| 2003 | Fourth qualifying round | (India) Mohun Bagan | 6–0 | 2–1 | 8–1 |
| 2003 | Group A | (China) Shanghai Shenhua | 2–1 (Note: Played at a neutral venue.) | | 2nd |
| 2003 | Group A | (Thailand) BEC Tero Sasana | 0–2 | | 2nd |
| 2003 | Group A | (Japan) Kashima Antlers | 1–0 | | 2nd |

==== AFC Champions League Elite ====
| Season | Round | Opposition | Home | Away | Agg. |
|---|---|---|---|---|---|
| 2026–27 | League stage | (Japan) Kyoto Sanga | 1–0 | —N/a | |
| 2026–27 | League stage | (China) Shanghai Port | —N/a | 1–1 | |
| 2026–27 | League stage | (Japan) Vissel Kobe | 0–1 | —N/a | |
| 2026–27 | League stage | (Japan) Kashiwa Reysol | —N/a | 0–2 | |
| 2026–27 | League stage | (China) Beijing Guoan | | —N/a | |
| 2026–27 | League stage | (Malaysia) Johor Darul Ta'zim | —N/a | | |
| 2026–27 | League stage | (Japan) Kashima Antlers | | —N/a | |
| 2026–27 | League stage | (Japan) Gamba Osaka | —N/a | | |
