= 2020 in South Korean football =

Football in South Korea
- Season: 2020

Men's football
- K League 1: Jeonbuk Hyundai Motors
- K League 2: Jeju United
- K3 League: Gimhae FC
- K4 League: Paju Citizen
- Korean FA Cup: Jeonbuk Hyundai Motors

Women's football
- WK League: Incheon Hyundai Steel Red Angels

This article shows a summary of the 2020 football season in South Korea. It started in May 2020 due to the COVID-19 pandemic. K League was scheduled to begin on February 29, but the season was suspended until the pandemic slowed. Players must be tested before each match, and are restricted from talking to other players.

== National teams ==
=== AFC U-23 Championship ===
9 January Group C	South Korea	1–0	China	Songkhla, Thailand
20:15	Lee Dong-jun 90+3'	Report		Stadium: Tinsulanon Stadium; Attendance: 6,000; Referee: Mohammed Abdulla Hassan Mohamed (United Arab Emirates)

12 January Group C	Iran	1–2	South Korea	Songkhla, Thailand
17:15	Shekari 54'	Report	Lee Dong-jun 22'; Cho Gue-sung 35'	Stadium: Tinsulanon Stadium; Attendance: 5,855; Referee: Adham Makhadmeh (Jordan)

15 January Group C	Uzbekistan	1–2	South Korea	Rangsit, Thailand
17:15	Abdixolikov 21'	Report	Oh Se-hun 5', 71'	Stadium: Thammasat Stadium; Referee: Hiroyuki Kimura (Japan)

Group C table
Pos	Team	Pld	W	D	L	GF	GA	GD	Pts	Qualification
1	South Korea	3	3	0	0	5	2	+3	9	Advance to knockout stage
2	Uzbekistan	3	1	1	1	4	3	+1	4	Advance to knockout stage
3	Iran	3	1	1	1	3	3	0	4	
4	China	3	0	0	3	0	4	−4	0	

Source: AFC
Rules for classification: Group stage tiebreakers

19 January Quarter-finals	South Korea	2–1	Jordan	Rangsit, Thailand
17:15	Cho Gue-sung 15'; Lee Dong-gyeong 90+5'	Report	Al-Naimat 75'	Stadium: Thammasat Stadium; Referee: Abdulrahman Al-Jassim (Qatar)

22 January Semi-finals	Australia	0–2	South Korea	Rangsit, Thailand
20:15		Report	Kim Dae-won 56'; Lee Dong-gyeong 76'	Stadium: Thammasat Stadium; Referee: Nawaf Shukralla (Bahrain)

26 January Final	South Korea	1–0 (a.e.t.)	Saudi Arabia	Bangkok, Thailand
19:30	Jeong Tae-wook 114'	Report		Stadium: Rajamangala Stadium; Referee: Chris Beath (Australia)

=== Friendlies ===
==== Senior team ====
14 November	Mexico	3–2	South Korea	Wiener Neustadt, Austria
21:00 UTC+1	Jiménez 67'; Antuna 69'; Salcedo 70'	Report	Hwang Ui-jo 20'; Kwon Kyung-won 87'	Stadium: Stadion Wiener Neustadt; Attendance: 0 Referee: Harald Lechner (Austria)

17 November	South Korea	2–1	Qatar	Maria Enzersdorf, Austria
14:00 UTC+1	Hwang Hee-chan 1'; Hwang Ui-jo 36'	Report	Ali 9'	Stadium: BSFZ-Arena; Attendance: 0 Referee: Julian Weinberger (Austria)

==== Under-23 team ====
12 November	Egypt	0–0	South Korea	Cairo, Egypt
20:00 UTC+2		Report		Stadium: Cairo International Stadium; Referee: Mahmoud El Banna (Egypt)

14 November	Brazil	3–1	South Korea	Cairo, Egypt
15:00 UTC+2	Cunha 42'; Rodrygo 61'; Neres 73'	Report	Lee Dong-gyeong 7'	Stadium: Cairo International Stadium; Referee: Ibrahim Nour El Din (Egypt)

== Leagues ==
=== K League 1 ===
Pos	Team	Pld	W	D	L	GF	GA	GD	Pts	Qualification or relegation (Note: Teams are split into two groups (Final A and Final B) after each have played 22 matches.)
1	Jeonbuk Hyundai Motors (C)	27	19	3	5	46	21	+25	60	Qualification for Champions League group stage
2	Ulsan Hyundai	27	17	6	4	54	23	+31	57	Qualification for Champions League group stage
3	Pohang Steelers	27	15	5	7	56	35	+21	50	Qualification for Champions League group stage
4	Sangju Sangmu (Note: Sangju Sangmu were a military team and were not eligible to represent South Korea in the AFC club competitions. Additionally, they were relegated to K League 2 regardless of their final position by moving their stronghold the next season.) (R)	27	13	5	9	34	36	−2	44	Relegation to K League 2
5	Daegu FC	27	10	8	9	43	39	+4	38	Qualification for Champions League group stage
6	Gwangju FC	27	6	7	14	32	46	−14	25	
7	Gangwon FC	27	9	7	11	36	41	−5	34	
8	Suwon Samsung Bluewings	27	8	7	12	27	30	−3	31	
9	FC Seoul	27	8	5	14	23	44	−21	29	
10	Seongnam FC	27	7	7	13	24	37	−13	28	
11	Incheon United	27	7	6	14	25	35	−10	27	
12	Busan IPark (R)	27	5	10	12	25	38	−13	25	Relegation to K League 2

Source: K League
Rules for classification: 1) Points; 2) Goals scored; 3) Goal difference; 4) Wins; 5) Head-to-head points
(C) Champions; (R) Relegated

=== K League 2 ===
==== Regular season ====
Pos	Team	Pld	W	D	L	GF	GA	GD	Pts	Promotion or qualification
1	Jeju United (C, P)	27	18	6	3	50	23	+27	60	Promotion to K League 1
2	Suwon FC (O, P)	27	17	3	7	52	28	+24	54	Qualification for promotion play-offs final
3	Gyeongnam FC	27	10	9	8	40	37	+3	39	Qualification for promotion play-offs first round
4	Daejeon Hana Citizen	27	11	6	10	36	35	+1	39	Qualification for promotion play-offs first round
5	Seoul E-Land	27	11	6	10	33	30	+3	39	
6	Jeonnam Dragons	27	8	14	5	31	25	+6	38	
7	Ansan Greeners	27	7	7	13	18	34	−16	28	
8	Bucheon FC 1995	27	7	5	15	19	36	−17	26	
9	FC Anyang	27	6	7	14	27	38	−11	25	
10	Chungnam Asan	27	5	7	15	20	40	−20	22	

Source: K League Soccerway
Rules for classification: 1) Points; 2) Goals scored; 3) Goal difference; 4) Wins; 5) Head-to-head points
(C) Champions; (O) Play-off winners; (P) Promoted

==== Promotion play-offs ====
First round			Final
			2	Suwon FC	1
3	Gyeongnam FC	1	3	Gyeongnam FC	1
4	Daejeon Hana Citizen	1

=== K3 League ===
==== Regular season ====
Pos	Team	Pld	W	D	L	GF	GA	GD	Pts	Qualification or relegation
1	Gimhae FC (C)	22	15	4	3	39	18	+21	49	Qualification for Championship final
2	Gyeongju KHNP	22	12	6	4	38	20	+18	42	Qualification for Championship semi-final
3	Gangneung City	22	13	3	6	30	15	+15	42	Qualification for Championship first round
4	Busan Transportation Corporation	22	12	5	5	36	17	+19	41	Qualification for Championship first round
5	Mokpo City	22	10	3	9	39	30	+9	33	
6	Hwaseong FC	22	9	6	7	29	27	+2	33	
7	Daejeon Korail	22	8	8	6	30	18	+12	32	
8	Gimpo Citizen	22	6	8	8	27	27	0	26	
9	Changwon City	22	9	7	6	33	25	+8	34	
10	Cheongju FC	22	9	7	6	25	25	0	34	
11	Cheonan City	22	9	6	7	27	25	+2	33	
12	Pyeongtaek Citizen	22	6	5	11	24	40	−16	23	
13	Yangju Citizen	22	6	2	14	17	45	−28	20	
14	Gyeongju Citizen (O)	22	3	6	13	16	36	−20	15	Qualification for relegation play-off
15	Chuncheon Citizen (R)	22	2	8	12	21	43	−22	14	Relegation to K4 League
16	Jeonju Citizen (R)	22	3	4	15	19	39	−20	13	Relegation to K4 League

Source: Soccerway Flashscore
Rules for classification: 1) Points; 2) Goal difference; 3) Goals scored; 4) Wins
(C) Champions; (O) Play-off winners; (R) Relegated

==== Championship play-offs ====
First round
3	Gangneung City	0
4	Busan Transportation Corporation	0

Semi-final
2	Gyeongju KHNP	1
3	Gangneung City	0

Final
1	Gimhae FC	1	1	2
2	Gyeongju KHNP	0	1	1

=== K4 League ===
==== Regular season ====
Pos	Team	Pld	W	D	L	GF	GA	GD	Pts	Qualification
1	Paju Citizen (C, P)	24	16	5	3	42	27	+15	53	Promotion to K3 League
2	Ulsan Citizen (P)	24	16	3	5	50	29	+21	51	Promotion to K3 League
3	Jinju Citizen	24	15	5	4	46	25	+21	50	Qualification for promotion play-offs
4	Pocheon Citizen	24	15	4	5	58	26	+32	49	Qualification for promotion play-offs
5	FC Namdong	24	13	2	9	46	27	+19	41	
6	Yeoju Citizen	24	12	3	9	37	36	+1	39	
7	Yangpyeong FC	24	11	3	10	28	28	0	36	
8	Siheung Citizen	24	8	5	11	35	31	+4	29	
9	Icheon Citizen	24	7	6	11	29	40	−11	27	
10	Chungju Citizen	24	5	4	15	24	45	−21	19	
11	Goyang Citizen	24	5	4	15	33	65	−32	19	
12	Seoul Nowon United	24	4	5	15	32	46	−14	17	
13	Seoul Jungnang	24	2	5	17	22	57	−35	11	

Source: Soccerway Official Instagram
Rules for classification: 1) Points; 2) Goal difference; 3) Head-to-head points; 4) Goals scored; 5) Wins
(C) Champions; (P) Promoted

==== Promotion play-offs ====
First round			Final
			K3	Gyeongju Citizen	2
3	Jinju Citizen	w/o	K4	Jinju Citizen	2
4	Pocheon Citizen	—

=== WK League ===
==== Regular season ====
Pos	Team	Pld	W	D	L	GF	GA	GD	Pts	Qualification
1	Incheon Hyundai Steel Red Angels (C)	21	18	1	2	60	11	+49	55	Qualification for play-offs final
2	Gyeongju KHNP	21	17	3	1	43	13	+30	54	Qualification for play-offs semi-final
3	Suwon UDC	21	11	0	10	34	24	+10	33	Qualification for play-offs semi-final
4	Hwacheon KSPO	21	9	5	7	24	31	−7	32	
5	Changnyeong WFC	21	7	5	9	33	41	−8	26	
6	Sejong Sportstoto	21	6	3	12	27	41	−14	21	
7	Seoul WFC	21	3	4	14	20	49	−29	13	
8	Boeun Sangmu	21	2	1	18	21	52	−31	7	

Source: Soccerway
(C) Champions

==== Championship play-offs ====
Semi-final			Final
			1	Incheon Hyundai Steel Red Angels	0	2	2
2	Gyeongju KHNP	1		Gyeongju KHNP	0	0	0
3	Suwon UDC	0

== Domestic cups ==
=== Korean FA Cup ===
Round of 16 (Fourth round)
Ulsan Hyundai	2
Gyeongju KHNP	0
Gangwon FC	4
Gwangju FC	2
Pohang Steelers (a.e.t.)	3
Sangju Sangmu	2
FC Seoul (p)	1 (4)
Daejeon Hana Citizen	1 (2)
Jeonbuk Hyundai Motors (a.e.t.)	3
Jeonnam Dragons	2
Busan IPark	1
Suwon FC	0
Seongnam FC (p)	1 (4)
Daegu FC	1 (2)
Suwon Samsung Bluewings (a.e.t.)	1
Jeju United	0

Quarter-finals (Fifth round)
Ulsan Hyundai	3
Gangwon FC	0
Pohang Steelers	5
FC Seoul	1
Jeonbuk Hyundai Motors	5
Busan IPark	1
Seongnam FC	1
Suwon Samsung Bluewings	0

Semi-finals (Sixth round)
Ulsan Hyundai (p)	1 (4)
Pohang Steelers	1 (3)
Jeonbuk Hyundai Motors	1
Seongnam FC	0

Final (Seventh round)
Ulsan Hyundai	1	1	2
Jeonbuk Hyundai Motors	1	2	3

== International cups ==
=== AFC Champions League ===
Team	Result	Round	Aggregate	Score	Opponent
FC Seoul	Group stage	Qualifying play-offs	4–1	4–1	(Malaysia) Kedah
FC Seoul	Group stage	Group E	Third place	1–0	(Australia) Melbourne Victory
FC Seoul	Group stage	Group E	Third place	1–2	(Australia) Melbourne Victory
FC Seoul	Group stage	Group E	Third place	1–2	(China) Beijing Guoan
FC Seoul	Group stage	Group E	Third place	1–3	(China) Beijing Guoan
FC Seoul	Group stage	Group E	Third place	5–0	(Thailand) Chiangrai United
FC Seoul	Group stage	Group E	Third place	1–2	(Thailand) Chiangrai United
Jeonbuk Hyundai Motors	Group stage	Group H	Third place	1–2	(Japan) Yokohama F. Marinos
Jeonbuk Hyundai Motors	Group stage	Group H	Third place	1–4	(Japan) Yokohama F. Marinos
Jeonbuk Hyundai Motors	Group stage	Group H	Third place	1–2	(China) Shanghai SIPG
Jeonbuk Hyundai Motors	Group stage	Group H	Third place	2–0	(China) Shanghai SIPG
Jeonbuk Hyundai Motors	Group stage	Group H	Third place	1–0	(Australia) Sydney FC
Jeonbuk Hyundai Motors	Group stage	Group H	Third place	2–2	(Australia) Sydney FC
Suwon Samsung Bluewings	Quarter-finals	Group G	Runners-up	0–1	(Japan) Vissel Kobe
Suwon Samsung Bluewings	Quarter-finals	Group G	Runners-up	2–0	(Japan) Vissel Kobe
Suwon Samsung Bluewings	Quarter-finals	Group G	Runners-up	0–0	(China) Guangzhou Evergrande
Suwon Samsung Bluewings	Quarter-finals	Group G	Runners-up	1–1	(China) Guangzhou Evergrande
Suwon Samsung Bluewings	Quarter-finals	Round of 16	3–2	3–2	(Japan) Yokohama F. Marinos
Suwon Samsung Bluewings	Quarter-finals	Quarter-finals	1–1 (6–7 p)	1–1 (a.e.t.)	(Japan) Vissel Kobe
Ulsan Hyundai	Champions	Group F	Winners	1–1	(Japan) FC Tokyo
Ulsan Hyundai	Champions	Group F	Winners	2–1	(Japan) FC Tokyo
Ulsan Hyundai	Champions	Group F	Winners	3–1	(China) Shanghai Shenhua
Ulsan Hyundai	Champions	Group F	Winners	4–1	(China) Shanghai Shenhua
Ulsan Hyundai	Champions	Group F	Winners	2–1	(Australia) Perth Glory
Ulsan Hyundai	Champions	Group F	Winners	2–0	(Australia) Perth Glory
Ulsan Hyundai	Champions	Round of 16	3–0	3–0	(Australia) Melbourne Victory
Ulsan Hyundai	Champions	Quarter-finals	2–0	2–0	(China) Beijing Guoan
Ulsan Hyundai	Champions	Semi-finals	2–1	2–1 (a.e.t.)	(Japan) Vissel Kobe
Ulsan Hyundai	Champions	Final	2–1	2–1	(Iran) Persepolis

== See also ==
- Football in South Korea
