= 2019 in South Korean football =

Football in South Korea
- Season: 2019

Men's football
- K League 1: Jeonbuk Hyundai Motors
- K League 2: Gwangju FC
- National League: Gangneung City
- K3 League Advanced: Hwaseong FC
- K3 League Basic: Ulsan Citizen
- Korean FA Cup: Suwon Samsung Bluewings

Women's football
- WK League: Incheon Hyundai Steel Red Angels

This article shows a summary of the 2019 football season in South Korea.

== National teams ==
=== AFC Asian Cup ===
| 7 January Group C | South Korea | 1–0 | Philippines | Dubai, United Arab Emirates |
| 17:30 | Hwang Ui-jo 67' | Report | | Stadium: Al Maktoum Stadium; Attendance: 3,185; Referee: Nawaf Shukralla (Bahrain) |

| 11 January Group C | Kyrgyzstan | 0–1 | South Korea | Al Ain, United Arab Emirates |
| 20:00 | | Report | Kim Min-jae 41' | Stadium: Hazza bin Zayed Stadium; Attendance: 4,893; Referee: Khamis Al-Marri (Qatar) |

| 16 January Group C | South Korea | 2–0 | China | Abu Dhabi, United Arab Emirates |
| 17:30 | Hwang Ui-jo 14' (pen.); Kim Min-jae 51' | Report | | Stadium: Al Nahyan Stadium; Attendance: 13,579; Referee: Abdulrahman Al-Jassim (Qatar) |

Group C table
| Pos | Team | Pld | W | D | L | GF | GA | GD | Pts | Qualification |
|---|---|---|---|---|---|---|---|---|---|---|
| 1 | South Korea | 3 | 3 | 0 | 0 | 4 | 0 | +4 | 9 | Advance to knockout stage |
| 2 | China | 3 | 2 | 0 | 1 | 5 | 3 | +2 | 6 | Advance to knockout stage |
| 3 | Kyrgyzstan | 3 | 1 | 0 | 2 | 4 | 4 | 0 | 3 | |
| 4 | Philippines | 3 | 0 | 0 | 3 | 1 | 7 | −6 | 0 | |

| 22 January Round of 16 | South Korea | 2–1 (a.e.t.) | Bahrain | Dubai, United Arab Emirates |
| 17:00 | Hwang Hee-chan 43'; Kim Jin-su 105+2' | Report | Al Romaihi 77' | Stadium: Rashid Stadium; Attendance: 7,658; Referee: Ryuji Sato (Japan) |

| 25 January Quarter-finals | South Korea | 0–1 | Qatar | Abu Dhabi, United Arab Emirates |
| 17:00 | | Report | Hatem 78' | Stadium: Zayed Sports City Stadium; Attendance: 13,791; Referee: Ravshan Irmatov (Uzbekistan) |

=== FIFA World Cup qualification ===
| 10 September AFC second round, Group H | Turkmenistan | 0–2 | South Korea | Ashgabat, Turkmenistan |
| 19:00 UTC+5 | | Report | Na Sang-ho 13'; Jung Woo-young 82' | Stadium: Köpetdag Stadium; Attendance: 26,000; Referee: Ammar Al-Jeneibi (United Arab Emirates); MVP: Na Sang-ho (South Korea) |

| 10 October AFC second round, Group H | South Korea | 8–0 | Sri Lanka | Hwaseong, South Korea |
| 20:00 UTC+9 | Son Heung-min 10', 45+5' (pen.); Kim Shin-wook 17', 30', 54', 64'; Hwang Hee-chan 20'; Kwon Chang-hoon 76' | Report | | Stadium: Hwaseong Stadium; Attendance: 23,522; Referee: Hasan Akrami (Iran); MVP: Kim Shin-wook (South Korea) |

| 15 October AFC second round, Group H | North Korea | 0–0 | South Korea | Pyongyang, North Korea |
| 17:30 UTC+9 | | Report | | Stadium: Kim Il-sung Stadium; Attendance: 100; Referee: Abdulrahman Al-Jassim (Qatar); MVP: An Tae-song (North Korea) |

| 14 November AFC second round, Group H | Lebanon | 0–0 | South Korea | Beirut, Lebanon |
| 15:00 UTC+2 | | Report | | Stadium: Camille Chamoun Sports City Stadium; Attendance: 170; Referee: Mohanad Qasim (Iraq); MVP: Bassel Jradi (Lebanon) |

=== EAFF Championship ===
| 11 December | South Korea | 2–0 | Hong Kong | Busan, South Korea |
| 19:30 UTC+9 | Hwang In-beom 45+1'; Na Sang-ho 82' | Report | | Stadium: Busan Asiad Main Stadium; Attendance: 1,070; Referee: Shaun Evans (Australia) |

| 15 December | South Korea | 1–0 | China | Busan, South Korea |
| 19:30 UTC+9 | Kim Min-jae 13' | Report | | Stadium: Busan Asiad Main Stadium; Attendance: 7,916; Referee: Muhammad Taqi (Singapore) |

| 18 December | South Korea | 1–0 | Japan | Busan, South Korea |
| 19:30 UTC+9 | Hwang In-beom 28' | Report | | Stadium: Busan Asiad Main Stadium; Attendance: 29,252; Referee: Ilgiz Tantashev (Uzbekistan) |

| Pos | Team | Pld | W | D | L | GF | GA | GD | Pts |
|---|---|---|---|---|---|---|---|---|---|
| 1 | South Korea (C, H) | 3 | 3 | 0 | 0 | 4 | 0 | +4 | 9 |
| 2 | Japan | 3 | 2 | 0 | 1 | 7 | 2 | +5 | 6 |
| 3 | China | 3 | 1 | 0 | 2 | 3 | 3 | 0 | 3 |
| 4 | Hong Kong | 3 | 0 | 0 | 3 | 0 | 9 | −9 | 0 |

Source: EAFF
(C) Champions; (H) Hosts

=== AFC U-23 Championship qualification ===
| 22 March Group H | South Korea | 8–0 | Chinese Taipei | Phnom Penh, Cambodia |
| 17:00 (UTC+7) | Lee Dong-jun 14' (pen.), 33'; Seo Gyeong-ju 39'; Lee Si-heon 68'; Cho Young-wook 69'; Lee Dong-gyeong 72', 73', 85' | Report | | Stadium: Phnom Penh Olympic Stadium; Attendance: 1,113; Referee: Sultan Al-Marzooqi (United Arab Emirates) |

| 24 March Group H | Cambodia | 1–6 | South Korea | Phnom Penh, Cambodia |
| 20:00 (UTC+7) | N. Kakada 60' | Report | Han Chan-hee 4'; Jang Min-gyu 8'; Kim Bo-sub 57'; Sovann 80' (o.g.); Lee Dong-gyeong 84', 90+3' | Stadium: Phnom Penh Olympic Stadium; Attendance: 1,328; Referee: Mohammed Al-Hoish (Saudi Arabia) |

| 26 March Group H | South Korea | 2–2 | Australia | Phnom Penh, Cambodia |
| 17:00 (UTC+7) | Cho Young-wook 26'; Lee Dong-gyeong 63' | Report | D'Agostino 16', 24' | Stadium: Phnom Penh Olympic Stadium; Attendance: 455; Referee: Yaqoob Abdul Baki (Oman) |

| Pos | Team | Pld | W | D | L | GF | GA | GD | Pts | Qualification |
|---|---|---|---|---|---|---|---|---|---|---|
| 1 | South Korea | 3 | 2 | 1 | 0 | 16 | 3 | +13 | 7 | Final tournament |
| 2 | Australia | 3 | 2 | 1 | 0 | 14 | 2 | +12 | 7 | Final tournament |
| 3 | Cambodia (H) | 3 | 0 | 1 | 2 | 2 | 13 | −11 | 1 | |
| 4 | Chinese Taipei | 3 | 0 | 1 | 2 | 1 | 15 | −14 | 1 | |

Source: AFC
Rules for classification: Qualification tiebreakers
(H) Hosts

=== FIFA Women's World Cup ===
Coming off an improved showing at the previous one, South Korea qualified for the 2019 FIFA Women's World Cup and were put in Group A with France, Norway and Nigeria. However, they could not repeat their prior success in 2015 and lost all three games and exited the tournament in the group stage, only scoring one goal in their entire run and even an own goal.

| 7 June Group A | France | 4–0 | South Korea | Paris, France |
| 21:00 | Le Sommer 9'; Renard 35', 45+2'; Henry 85' | Report | | Stadium: Parc des Princes; Attendance: 45,261; Referee: Claudia Umpiérrez (Uruguay) |

| 12 June Group A | Nigeria | 2–0 | South Korea | Grenoble, France |
| 15:00 | Kim Do-yeon 29' (o.g.); Oshoala 75' | Report | | Stadium: Stade des Alpes; Attendance: 11,252; Referee: Anastasia Pustovoitova (Russia) |

| 17 June Group A | South Korea | 1–2 | Norway | Reims, France |
| 21:00 | Yeo Min-ji 78' | Report | Graham Hansen 5' (pen.); Herlovsen 51' (pen.) | Stadium: Stade Auguste-Delaune; Attendance: 13,034; Referee: Marie-Soleil Beaudoin (Canada) |

Group A table
| Pos | Team | Pld | W | D | L | GF | GA | GD | Pts | Qualification |
|---|---|---|---|---|---|---|---|---|---|---|
| 1 | France | 3 | 3 | 0 | 0 | 7 | 1 | +6 | 9 | Advance to knockout stage |
| 2 | Norway | 3 | 2 | 0 | 1 | 6 | 3 | +3 | 6 | Advance to knockout stage |
| 3 | Nigeria | 3 | 1 | 0 | 2 | 2 | 4 | −2 | 3 | |
| 4 | South Korea | 3 | 0 | 0 | 3 | 1 | 8 | −7 | 0 | |

=== Friendlies ===
==== Senior team ====
| 22 March | South Korea | 1–0 | Bolivia | Ulsan, South Korea |
| 20:00 UTC+9 | Lee Chung-yong 86' | Report | | Stadium: Ulsan Munsu Football Stadium; Attendance: 41,117; Referee: Khamis Al-Marri (Qatar) |

| 26 March | South Korea | 2–1 | Colombia | Seoul, South Korea |
| 20:00 UTC+9 | Son Heung-min 16'; Lee Jae-sung 58' | Report | Díaz 48' | Stadium: Seoul World Cup Stadium; Attendance: 64,388; Referee: Abdulrahman Al-Jassim (Qatar) |

| 7 June | South Korea | 1–0 | Australia | Busan, South Korea |
| 20:00 UTC+9 | Hwang Ui-jo 76' | Report | | Stadium: Busan Asiad Main Stadium; Attendance: 52,213; Referee: Minoru Tōjō (Japan) |

| 11 June | South Korea | 1–1 | Iran | Seoul, South Korea |
| 20:00 UTC+9 | Hwang Ui-jo 57' | Report | Kim Young-gwon 62' (o.g.) | Stadium: Seoul World Cup Stadium; Attendance: 60,213; Referee: Ryuji Sato (Japan) |

| 5 September | South Korea | 2–2 | Georgia | Istanbul, Turkey |
| 16:30 UTC+3 | Hwang Ui-jo 48', 85' | Report | Ananidze 40'; Kvilitaia 90' | Stadium: Başakşehir Fatih Terim Stadium; Attendance: 750; Referee: Hüseyin Göçek (Turkey) |

| 19 November | South Korea | 0–3 | Brazil | Abu Dhabi, United Arab Emirates |
| 17:30 UTC+4 | | Report | Paquetá 9'; Coutinho 36'; Danilo 60' | Stadium: Mohammed bin Zayed Stadium; Attendance: 9,000; Referee: Ammar Al-Jeneibi (United Arab Emirates) |

==== Under-23 team ====
| 11 October | South Korea | 3–1 | Uzbekistan | Hwaseong, South Korea |
| 20:35 (UTC+9) | Kim Jae-woo 37'; Oh Se-hun 71'; Kim Jin-kyu 75' | Report | Yakhshiboev 20' | Stadium: Hwaseong Stadium; Attendance: 6,539; Referee: Yin Hao Shen (China) |

| 14 October | South Korea | 1–2 | Uzbekistan | Cheonan, South Korea |
| 20:00 (UTC+9) | Jeong Woo-yeong 30' | Report | Abdixolikov 49'; Yakhshiboev 81' | Stadium: Cheonan Baekseok Stadium; Attendance: 7,305; Referee: Liu Kwok Man (Hong Kong) |

| 13 November | South Korea | 2–0 | Saudi Arabia | Dubai, United Arab Emirates |
| 16:00 (UTC+4) | Lee Dong-jun 55'; Cho Gue-sung 77' | Report |

| 15 November | South Korea | 3–0 | Bahrain | Dubai, United Arab Emirates |
| 16:00 (UTC+4) | Oh Se-hun 48', 56'; Kim Dae-won 90+5' | Report |

| 17 November | South Korea | 3–3 | Iraq | Dubai, United Arab Emirates |
| 16:00 (UTC+4) | Jarir 45' (o.g.); Kim Dae-won 56'; Lee Dong-jun 80' | Report | Lee Sang-min 72' (o.g.); Al-Ammari 90' (pen.); Nassif 95+5' (pen.) |

| 19 November | United Arab Emirates | 1–1 | South Korea | Dubai, United Arab Emirates |
| 16:00 (UTC+4) | Jumaa 45+3' | Report | Nasser 47' (o.g.) |

== Leagues ==
=== K League 1 ===
| Pos | Team | Pld | W | D | L | GF | GA | GD | Pts | Qualification or relegation (Note: Teams are split into two groups (Final A and Final B) after each have played 33 matches.) |
|---|---|---|---|---|---|---|---|---|---|---|
| 1 | Jeonbuk Hyundai Motors (C) | 38 | 22 | 13 | 3 | 72 | 32 | +40 | 79 | Qualification for Champions League group stage |
| 2 | Ulsan Hyundai | 38 | 23 | 10 | 5 | 71 | 39 | +32 | 79 | Qualification for Champions League group stage |
| 3 | FC Seoul | 38 | 15 | 11 | 12 | 53 | 49 | +4 | 56 | Qualification for Champions League play-off round |
| 4 | Pohang Steelers | 38 | 16 | 8 | 14 | 49 | 49 | 0 | 56 | |
| 5 | Daegu FC | 38 | 13 | 16 | 9 | 46 | 37 | +9 | 55 | |
| 6 | Gangwon FC | 38 | 14 | 8 | 16 | 56 | 58 | −2 | 50 | |
| 7 | Sangju Sangmu | 38 | 16 | 7 | 15 | 49 | 53 | −4 | 55 | |
| 8 | Suwon Samsung Bluewings | 38 | 12 | 12 | 14 | 46 | 49 | −3 | 48 | Qualification for Champions League group stage (Note: Qualified as champions of FA Cup.) |
| 9 | Seongnam FC | 38 | 12 | 9 | 17 | 30 | 40 | −10 | 45 | |
| 10 | Incheon United | 38 | 7 | 13 | 18 | 33 | 54 | −21 | 34 | |
| 11 | Gyeongnam FC (R) | 38 | 6 | 15 | 17 | 43 | 61 | −18 | 33 | Qualification for relegation play-offs |
| 12 | Jeju United (R) | 38 | 5 | 12 | 21 | 45 | 72 | −27 | 27 | Relegation to K League 2 |

Source: K League
Rules for classification: 1) Points; 2) Goals scored; 3) Goal difference; 4) Wins; 5) Head-to-head points
(C) Champions; (R) Relegated

=== K League 2 ===
==== Regular season ====
| Pos | Team | Pld | W | D | L | GF | GA | GD | Pts | Promotion or qualification |
|---|---|---|---|---|---|---|---|---|---|---|
| 1 | Gwangju FC (C, P) | 36 | 21 | 10 | 5 | 59 | 31 | +28 | 73 | Promotion to K League 1 |
| 2 | Busan IPark (O, P) | 36 | 18 | 13 | 5 | 72 | 47 | +25 | 67 | Qualification for promotion playoffs semi-final |
| 3 | FC Anyang | 36 | 15 | 10 | 11 | 63 | 50 | +13 | 55 | Qualification for promotion playoffs first round |
| 4 | Bucheon FC 1995 | 36 | 14 | 9 | 13 | 49 | 51 | −2 | 51 | Qualification for promotion playoffs first round |
| 5 | Ansan Greeners | 36 | 14 | 8 | 14 | 46 | 42 | +4 | 50 | |
| 6 | Jeonnam Dragons | 36 | 13 | 9 | 14 | 43 | 47 | −4 | 48 | |
| 7 | Asan Mugunghwa | 36 | 12 | 8 | 16 | 42 | 56 | −14 | 44 | |
| 8 | Suwon FC | 36 | 11 | 10 | 15 | 49 | 55 | −6 | 43 | |
| 9 | Daejeon Citizen | 36 | 8 | 11 | 17 | 31 | 47 | −16 | 35 | |
| 10 | Seoul E-Land | 36 | 5 | 10 | 21 | 43 | 71 | −28 | 25 | |

Source: K League Soccerway
Rules for classification: 1) Points; 2) Goals scored; 3) Goal difference; 4) Wins; 5) Head-to-head points
(C) Champions; (O) Play-off winners; (P) Promoted

==== Promotion playoffs ====
When the first round or semi-final match was finished as a draw, its winners were decided on the regular season rankings without extra time and the penalty shoot-out. Busan IPark won 2–0 on aggregate and were promoted to the K League 1, while Gyeongnam FC were relegated to the K League 2.

First round
3 | FC Anyang | 1
4 | Bucheon FC 1995 | 1

Semi-final
2 | Busan IPark | 1
3 | FC Anyang | 0

Final
Busan IPark | 0 | 2 | 2
Gyeongnam FC | 0 | 0 | 0

=== Korea National League ===
==== Regular season ====
| Pos | Team | Pld | W | D | L | GF | GA | GD | Pts | Qualification or relegation |
|---|---|---|---|---|---|---|---|---|---|---|
| 1 | Gangneung City (C) | 28 | 19 | 4 | 5 | 50 | 26 | +24 | 61 | Qualification for playoffs final |
| 2 | Cheonan City | 28 | 12 | 8 | 8 | 32 | 33 | −1 | 44 | Qualification for playoffs semi-final |
| 3 | Gyeongju KHNP | 28 | 10 | 11 | 7 | 35 | 28 | +7 | 41 | Qualification for playoffs semi-final |
| 4 | Daejeon Korail | 28 | 10 | 9 | 9 | 38 | 36 | +2 | 39 | |
| 5 | Busan Transportation Corporation | 28 | 9 | 11 | 8 | 37 | 32 | +5 | 38 | |
| 6 | Mokpo City | 28 | 7 | 8 | 13 | 26 | 35 | −9 | 29 | |
| 7 | Gimhae FC | 28 | 7 | 7 | 14 | 26 | 29 | −3 | 28 | |
| 8 | Changwon City | 28 | 5 | 8 | 15 | 23 | 48 | −25 | 23 | |

Source: Korea National League
Rules for classification: 1) Points; 2) Goal difference; 3) Goals scored
(C) Champions

==== Championship playoffs ====
| Semi-final | | | | | Final |
| | | | | | 1 | Gangneung City | 0 | 2 | 2 |
| 2 | Cheonan City | 0 | 2 | 2 | SF | Gyeongju KHNP | 0 | 0 | 0 |
| 3 | Gyeongju KHNP | 2 | 2 | 4 |

=== K3 League Advanced ===
==== Regular season ====
| Pos | Team | Pld | W | D | L | GF | GA | GD | Pts | Qualification |
|---|---|---|---|---|---|---|---|---|---|---|
| 1 | Hwaseong FC (C) | 22 | 16 | 2 | 4 | 44 | 19 | +25 | 50 | Qualification for Championship final |
| 2 | Gyeongju Citizen | 22 | 14 | 4 | 4 | 36 | 21 | +15 | 46 | Qualification for Championship first round |
| 3 | Gimpo Citizen | 22 | 12 | 6 | 4 | 28 | 19 | +9 | 42 | Qualification for Championship first round |
| 4 | Yangpyeong FC | 22 | 13 | 2 | 7 | 42 | 30 | +12 | 41 | Qualification for Championship first round and K4 League (Note: Qualified after getting a license for K4 League.) |
| 5 | Pocheon Citizen | 22 | 12 | 3 | 7 | 30 | 21 | +9 | 39 | Qualification for Championship first round and K4 League |
| 6 | Paju Citizen | 22 | 11 | 2 | 9 | 30 | 26 | +4 | 35 | Qualification for K4 League (Note: Qualified after getting a license for K4 League.) |
| 7 | Siheung Citizen | 22 | 8 | 5 | 9 | 22 | 25 | −3 | 29 | Qualification for K4 League |
| 8 | Cheongju FC | 22 | 8 | 4 | 10 | 29 | 32 | −3 | 28 | |
| 9 | Icheon Citizen | 22 | 7 | 6 | 9 | 27 | 33 | −6 | 27 | Qualification for K4 League |
| 10 | Chuncheon FC | 22 | 4 | 3 | 15 | 23 | 38 | −15 | 15 | |
| 11 | Pyeongtaek Citizen | 22 | 3 | 2 | 17 | 23 | 47 | −24 | 11 | |
| 12 | Chungju Citizen (Note: Chungju Citizen was deducted 10 points.) | 22 | 3 | 3 | 16 | 17 | 40 | −23 | 2 | Qualification for K4 League |

Source: Soccerway KFA
Rules for classification: 1) Points; 2) Goal difference; 3) Goals scored
(C) Champions

==== Championship playoffs ====
When the first round and semi-final matches were finished as draws, their winners were decided on the regular season rankings without extra time and the penalty shoot-out.

First round
Gyeongju Citizen | 1
Pocheon Citizen | 3
Gimpo Citizen | 0
Yangpyeong FC | 1

Semi-final
Yangpyeong FC | 3
Pocheon Citizen | 0

Final
Hwaseong FC | 1 | 1 | 2
Yangpyeong FC | 0 | 0 | 0

=== K3 League Basic ===
| Pos | Team | Pld | W | D | L | GF | GA | GD | Pts | Qualification |
|---|---|---|---|---|---|---|---|---|---|---|
| 1 | Ulsan Citizen (C) | 21 | 15 | 5 | 1 | 44 | 12 | +32 | 50 | |
| 2 | Jeonju Citizen | 21 | 15 | 4 | 2 | 56 | 22 | +34 | 49 | Qualification for K3 League (Note: Qualified after getting a license for K3 League.) |
| 3 | Yangju Citizen | 21 | 14 | 6 | 1 | 62 | 19 | +43 | 48 | Qualification for K3 League |
| 4 | Yeoju Sejong | 21 | 12 | 2 | 7 | 58 | 25 | +33 | 38 | |
| 5 | Seoul Jungnang | 21 | 6 | 1 | 14 | 25 | 41 | −16 | 19 | |
| 6 | Goyang Citizen | 21 | 4 | 2 | 15 | 23 | 58 | −35 | 14 | |
| 7 | Pyeongchang FC | 21 | 2 | 4 | 15 | 23 | 66 | −43 | 10 | |
| 8 | Seoul Nowon United (Note: Seoul Nowon United was deducted 10 points.) | 21 | 3 | 2 | 16 | 33 | 81 | −48 | 1 | |

Source: 7m.com KFA
Rules for classification: 1) Points; 2) Goal difference; 3) Goals scored
(C) Champions

=== WK League ===
==== Regular season ====
| Pos | Team | Pld | W | D | L | GF | GA | GD | Pts | Qualification |
|---|---|---|---|---|---|---|---|---|---|---|
| 1 | Incheon Hyundai Steel Red Angels (C) | 28 | 24 | 4 | 0 | 82 | 19 | +63 | 76 | Qualification for playoffs final |
| 2 | Gyeongju KHNP | 28 | 14 | 7 | 7 | 62 | 35 | +27 | 49 | Qualification for playoffs semi-final |
| 3 | Suwon UDC | 28 | 13 | 10 | 5 | 52 | 42 | +10 | 49 | Qualification for playoffs semi-final |
| 4 | Hwacheon KSPO | 28 | 12 | 8 | 8 | 49 | 39 | +10 | 44 | |
| 5 | Gumi Sportstoto | 28 | 9 | 9 | 10 | 37 | 40 | −3 | 36 | |
| 6 | Boeun Sangmu | 28 | 8 | 6 | 14 | 22 | 36 | −14 | 30 | |
| 7 | Seoul WFC | 28 | 3 | 6 | 19 | 26 | 63 | −37 | 15 | |
| 8 | Changnyeong WFC | 28 | 1 | 6 | 21 | 15 | 71 | −56 | 9 | |

Source: Soccerway
(C) Champions

==== Championship playoffs ====
| Semi-final | | | Final |
| | | | 1 | Incheon Hyundai Steel Red Angels | 0 | 1 | 1 |
| 2 | Gyeongju KHNP | 0 | | Suwon UDC | 0 | 0 | 0 |
| 3 | Suwon UDC | 2 |

== Domestic cups ==
=== Korean FA Cup ===
Round of 32
Suwon Samsung Bluewings | 1
Pohang Steelers | 0
Gwangju FC (p) | 2 (4)
Andong Science College | 2 (3)
Gyeongju KHNP | 2
Gimpo Citizen | 1
Incheon United | 0
Cheongju FC | 1
Suwon FC | 1
Daegu FC | 2
Gyeongnam FC | 2
Pocheon Citizen | 1
Hwaseong FC | 5
Yangpyeong FC | 2
Cheonan City (a.e.t.) | 1
Mokpo City | 0
Sangju Sangmu (p) | 0 (10)
Seongnam FC | 0 (9)
Jeju United (p) | 1 (4)
Gangneung City | 1 (2)
Jeonbuk Hyundai Motors | 0
FC Anyang | 1
Changwon City | 2
Yeungnam University | 1
Gangwon FC | 3
FC Seoul | 2
Paju Citizen | 2
Dankook University | 0
Seoul E-Land | 1
Honam University | 0
Ulsan Hyundai | 0
Daejeon Korail | 2

Round of 16
Suwon Samsung Bluewings | 3
Gwangju FC | 0
Gyeongju KHNP | 2
Cheongju FC | 0
Daegu FC | 0
Gyeongnam FC | 2
Hwaseong FC (p) | 2 (4)
Cheonan City | 2 (3)
Sangju Sangmu (p) | 1 (13)
Jeju United | 1 (12)
FC Anyang | 1
Changwon City (a.e.t.) | 2
Gangwon FC | 2
Paju Citizen | 0
Seoul E-Land | 0
Daejeon Korail | 2

Quarter-finals
Suwon Samsung Bluewings (p) | 2 (3)
Gyeongju KHNP | 2 (1)
Gyeongnam FC | 1
Hwaseong FC | 2
Sangju Sangmu | 2
Changwon City | 1
Gangwon FC | 0
Daejeon Korail | 2

Semi-finals
18 September, 2 October
Suwon Samsung Bluewings (a.e.t.) | 0 | 3 | 3
Hwaseong FC | 1 | 0 | 1
18 September, 2 October
Sangju Sangmu | 1 | 2 | 3 (2)
Daejeon Korail (p) | 1 | 2 | 3 (4)

Final
6, 10 November
Suwon Samsung Bluewings | 0 | 4 | 4
Daejeon Korail | 0 | 0 | 0

=== Korea National League Championship ===
==== Group stage ====
Group A
| Pos | Team | Pld | Pts |
|---|---|---|---|
| 1 | Daejeon Korail | 3 | 4 |
| 2 | Busan Transportation Corporation | 3 | 4 |
| 3 | Gimhae City | 3 | 4 |
| 4 | Cheonan City | 3 | 4 |

Group B
| Pos | Team | Pld | Pts |
|---|---|---|---|
| 1 | Gangneung City | 3 | 7 |
| 2 | Gyeongju KHNP | 3 | 6 |
| 3 | Changwon City | 3 | 2 |
| 4 | Mokpo City | 3 | 1 |

==== Knockout stage ====
Semi-finals
A1 | Daejeon Korail | 0
B2 | Gyeongju KHNP | 2
B1 | Gangneung City | 3
A2 | Busan Transportation Corporation | 1

Final
Gyeongju KHNP | 2
Gangneung City | 0

== International cups ==
=== AFC Champions League ===
| Team | Result | Round | Aggregate | Score | Venue | Opponent |
|---|---|---|---|---|---|---|
| Daegu FC | Group stage | Group F | Third place | 3–1 | Away | (Australia) Melbourne Victory |
| Daegu FC | Group stage | Group F | Third place | 4–0 | Home | (Australia) Melbourne Victory |
| Daegu FC | Group stage | Group F | Third place | 3–1 | Home | (China) Guangzhou Evergrande |
| Daegu FC | Group stage | Group F | Third place | 0–1 | Away | (China) Guangzhou Evergrande |
| Daegu FC | Group stage | Group F | Third place | 0–2 | Away | (Japan) Sanfrecce Hiroshima |
| Daegu FC | Group stage | Group F | Third place | 0–1 | Home | (Japan) Sanfrecce Hiroshima |
| Gyeongnam FC | Group stage | Group E | Third place | 2–2 | Home | (China) Shandong Luneng |
| Gyeongnam FC | Group stage | Group E | Third place | 1–2 | Away | (China) Shandong Luneng |
| Gyeongnam FC | Group stage | Group E | Third place | 1–1 | Away | (Malaysia) Johor Darul Ta'zim |
| Gyeongnam FC | Group stage | Group E | Third place | 2–0 | Home | (Malaysia) Johor Darul Ta'zim |
| Gyeongnam FC | Group stage | Group E | Third place | 2–3 | Home | (Japan) Kashima Antlers |
| Gyeongnam FC | Group stage | Group E | Third place | 1–0 | Away | (Japan) Kashima Antlers |
| Jeonbuk Hyundai Motors | Round of 16 | Group G | Winners | 3–1 | Home | (China) Beijing Guoan |
| Jeonbuk Hyundai Motors | Round of 16 | Group G | Winners | 1–0 | Away | (China) Beijing Guoan |
| Jeonbuk Hyundai Motors | Round of 16 | Group G | Winners | 0–1 | Away | (Thailand) Buriram United |
| Jeonbuk Hyundai Motors | Round of 16 | Group G | Winners | 0–0 | Home | (Thailand) Buriram United |
| Jeonbuk Hyundai Motors | Round of 16 | Group G | Winners | 1–0 | Away | (Japan) Urawa Red Diamonds |
| Jeonbuk Hyundai Motors | Round of 16 | Group G | Winners | 2–1 | Home | (Japan) Urawa Red Diamonds |
| Jeonbuk Hyundai Motors | Round of 16 | Round of 16 | 2–2 (3–5 p) | 1–1 | Away | (China) Shanghai SIPG |
| Jeonbuk Hyundai Motors | Round of 16 | Round of 16 | 2–2 (3–5 p) | 1–1 (a.e.t.) | Home | (China) Shanghai SIPG |
| Ulsan Hyundai | Round of 16 | Qualifying play-offs | 5–1 | 5–1 | — | (Malaysia) Perak |
| Ulsan Hyundai | Round of 16 | Group H | Winners | 0–0 | Away | (Australia) Sydney FC |
| Ulsan Hyundai | Round of 16 | Group H | Winners | 1–0 | Home | (Australia) Sydney FC |
| Ulsan Hyundai | Round of 16 | Group H | Winners | 1–0 | Home | (China) Shanghai SIPG |
| Ulsan Hyundai | Round of 16 | Group H | Winners | 0–5 | Away | (China) Shanghai SIPG |
| Ulsan Hyundai | Round of 16 | Group H | Winners | 1–0 | Home | (Japan) Kawasaki Frontale |
| Ulsan Hyundai | Round of 16 | Group H | Winners | 2–2 | Away | (Japan) Kawasaki Frontale |
| Ulsan Hyundai | Round of 16 | Round of 16 | 2–4 | 2–1 | Away | (Japan) Urawa Red Diamonds |
| Ulsan Hyundai | Round of 16 | Round of 16 | 2–4 | 0–3 | Home | (Japan) Urawa Red Diamonds |

== See also ==
- Football in South Korea
