= 2019 K3 League Basic =

K3 League Basic
- Season: 2019
- Dates: 24 March – 13 October 2019
- Champions: Ulsan Citizen (1st title)
- Promoted: Jeonju Citizen; Yangju Citizen
- Matches: 84
- Goals: 314 (3.74 per match)
- Best player: Gu Jong-wook
- Top goalscorer: Patrick Allan (14 goals)

The 2019 K3 League Basic was the third and last season of the K3 League Basic. After the 2019 season, amateur K3 Leagues were relaunched as semi-professional leagues in the name of K3 League and K4 League.

== Teams ==
=== Team changes ===
Relegated from K3 League Advanced

- Jeonju Citizen
- Seoul Jungnang

Promoted to K3 League Advanced

- Chungju Citizen
- Paju Citizen
- Siheung Citizen

Withdrawn

- Busan FC
- Buyeo FC
- FC Uijeongbu

Newly joined

- Ulsan Citizen

=== General information ===
Club	City	Stadium	Capacity	Manager
Goyang Citizen	Goyang	Goyang Sports Complex	41,311	(South Korea) Kim Jin-ok
Pyeongchang FC	Pyeongchang	Pyeongchang Sports Complex	6,000	(South Korea) An Hong-min
Seoul Nowon United	Seoul	Nowon Madeul Stadium	446	(South Korea) Jo Dong-hyun
Yangju Citizen	Pyeongtaek	Yangju Godeok Stadium	15,000	(South Korea) Kim Seong-il
Yeoju Sejong	Yeoju	Yeoju Sports Complex	21,600	(South Korea) Oh Ju-po
Ulsan Citizen	Ulsan	Ulsan Stadium	19,471	(South Korea) Yoon Kyun-sang
Jeonju Citizen	Jeonju	Jeonju Stadium	30,000	(South Korea) Jung Jin-hyuk
Seoul Jungnang	Seoul	Jungnang Public Ground	400	(South Korea) Kim Sang-hwa

=== Foreign players ===
In this year, the number of foreign players limition is changed. Restricting the number of foreign players strictly to four per team, including a slot for a player from AFC countries. A team could use four foreign players on the field each game including at least one player from the AFC confederation.

Players name in bold indicates the player is registered during the mid-season transfer window.

Club	Player 1	Player 2	Player 3	Asian Player
Goyang Citizen	(South Sudan) Martin Sawi	(South Sudan) **Paul Puk Kun Pal**		(China) Cao Hanchen
Pyeongchang FC				
Seoul Nowon United				
Yangju Citizen	(Serbia) Lazar Djurovic			
Yeoju Sejong	(Brazil) Patrick Allan			
Ulsan Citizen				
Jeonju Citizen				
Seoul Jungnang				

== League table ==
Pos	Team	Pld	W	D	L	GF	GA	GD	Pts	Qualification
1	Ulsan Citizen (C)	21	15	5	1	44	12	+32	50	
2	Jeonju Citizen	21	15	4	2	56	22	+34	49	Qualification for K3 League (Note: Qualified after getting a license for K3 League.)
3	Yangju Citizen	21	14	6	1	62	19	+43	48	Qualification for K3 League
4	Yeoju Sejong	21	12	2	7	58	25	+33	38	
5	Seoul Jungnang	21	6	1	14	25	41	−16	19	
6	Goyang Citizen	21	4	2	15	23	58	−35	14	
7	Pyeongchang FC	21	2	4	15	23	66	−43	10	
8	Seoul Nowon United (Note: Seoul Nowon United was deducted 10 points.)	21	3	2	16	33	81	−48	1	

Source: 7m.com KFA
Rules for classification: 1) Points; 2) Goal difference; 3) Goals scored
(C) Champions

== Results ==
=== Matches 1–14 ===
Home \ Away	ULC	JC	YC	YSF	SJ	GC	SU	PFC
Ulsan Citizen	—	3–0	1–1	2–1	2–1	1–0	5–2	2–1
Jeonju Citizen	0–0	—	1–0	3–1	1–2	2–1	7–0	7–1
Yangju Citizen	1–1	1–1	—	1–1	4–1	8–0	5–2	11–0
Yeoju Sejong	0–1	1–2	0–2	—	1–0	6–0	5–1	6–1
Seoul Jungnang	0–1	1–7	0–1	2–3	—	3–1	1–3	2–1
Goyang Citizen	0–3	1–2	2–3	1–5	1–3	—	5–0	1–0
Seoul Nowon United	0–8	2–3	1–2	1–6	4–1	7–1	—	3–3
Pyeongchang FC	0–1	0–4	0–1	1–5	0–0	1–2	3–2	—

Source: JoinKFA
Legend: Blue = home team win; Yellow = draw; Red = away team win.

=== Matches 15–21 ===
Home \ Away	ULC	JC	YC	YSF	SJ	GC	SU	PFC
Ulsan Citizen	—	—	0–1	1–1	—	—	—	3–1
Jeonju Citizen	1–1	—	—	2–1	—	—	3–1	2–1
Yangju Citizen	—	3–3	—	—	—	4–2	8–0	—
Yeoju Sejong	—	—	1–2	—	3–1	—	—	6–0
Seoul Jungnang	0–2	0–1	0–1	—	—	—	4–2	—
Goyang Citizen	1–2	1–4	—	0–2	1–0	—	—	—
Seoul Nowon United	0–4	—	—	1–3	—	0–0	—	1–4
Pyeongchang FC	—	—	2–2	—	1–3	2–2	—	—

Source: JoinKFA
Legend: Blue = home team win; Yellow = draw; Red = away team win.

== Promotion playoffs ==
The promotion-relegation playoff was contested between winners of Basic league playoff (semi-final) and 10th-placed team of Advanced league, but the match became meaningless after Korea Football Association decided to examine every K3 League club for qualification for newly-founded K3 League or K4 League.

Semi-final
Yangju Citizen	3
Yeoju Sejong	0
Chuncheon FC	bye
—	—

Final
Yangju Citizen	0
Chuncheon FC	0

== Top scorers ==
Rank	Player	Club	Goals
1	(Brazil) Patrick Allan	Yeoju Sejong	14
2	(South Korea) Kim Sang-min	Jeonju Citizen	12
2	(South Korea) Oh Tae-hwan	Jeonju Citizen	12
2	(South Korea) Hwang Jung-hyun	Yangju Citizen	12
5	(Serbia) Lazar Djurovic	Yangju Citizen	11
5	(South Sudan) Martin Sawi	Goyang Citizen	11

== See also ==
- 2019 in South Korean football
- 2019 Korean FA Cup
