= 2025 K3 League =

South Korean football league season

K3 League
- Season: 2025
- Dates: 1 March – 8 November 2025
- Champions: Gimhae FC 2008 (2nd title)
- Promoted: Gimhae FC 2008; Paju Citizen
- Best Player: Lee Jae-gun
- Top goalscorer: Lee Rae-jun (15 goals)

The 2025 K3 League is the sixth season of the semi-professional K3 League, the third-highest league of men's football in South Korea.

On 11 August 2025, Gimhae FC 2008 and Paju Citizen were approved to join the K League 2 for the 2026 season after switching to professional teams at the fourth meeting of the K League Federation. This season was their last season in semi-professional leagues.

== Competition format ==
The pre-season winter transfer window opened between 1 January 2025 and 24 March 2025, and the summer transfer window opened between 20 June 2025 and 31 July 2025.

The 2025 season was held from 1 March to 8 November, and consisted of 30 rounds, with each team playing 28 matches. One team took a rest in each round as the number of participating teams was an odd number.

While fifteen teams competed in the 2025 season, each of them had to include at least three under-23 players in the matchday squad, and at least one of those players had to include in the starting line-up.

The 15th-placed team advanced to the relegation play-off, where they played runners-up of the 2025 K4 League.

== Teams ==
=== Team changes ===
There was generally no promotion or relegation between the K3 League and the K League 2, but Hwaseong FC qualified for the K League 2 after succeeding to turn professional at the end of 2024 season.

Previously known as Jeonbuk Hyundai Motors B, Jeonbuk Hyundai Motors N participated after winning the 2024 K4 League. Daegu FC B were directly relegated as the lowest-ranked team of the 2024 season.

Promoted to K League 2

- Hwaseong FC

Promoted from K4 League

- Jeonbuk Hyundai Motors N

Relegated to K4 League

- Daegu FC B

=== Stadiums and locations ===
Locations of the 2025 K3 League teams

| Team | City | Stadium | Capacity |
|---|---|---|---|
| Busan Transportation Corporation | Busan | Gudeok Stadium | 4,549 |
| Changwon FC | Changwon | Changwon Sports Park | 27,085 |
| Chuncheon FC | Chuncheon | Chuncheon Songam Sports Town Auxiliary Stadium | 500 |
| Daejeon Korail | Daejeon | Daejeon World Cup Stadium Auxiliary Pitch | 478 |
| Gangneung Citizen | Gangneung | Gangneung Stadium | 3,000 |
| Gyeongju KHNP | Gyeongju | Gyeongju Civic Stadium | 12,199 |
| Gimhae FC 2008 | Gimhae | Gimhae Sports Complex | 15,066 |
| Jeonbuk Hyundai Motors N | Wanju | Wanju Public Stadium | 3,377 |
| FC Mokpo | Mokpo | Mokpo International Football Center | 9,132 |
| Paju Citizen | Paju | Paju Stadium | 25,000 |
| Pocheon Citizen | Pocheon | Pocheon Sports Complex | 7,000 |
| Siheung Citizen | Siheung | Jeongwang Stadium | 1,000 |
| Ulsan Citizen | Ulsan | Ulsan Stadium | 19,431 |
| Yangpyeong FC | Yangpyeong | Yangpyeong Sports Complex | 6,300 |
| Yeoju FC | Yeoju | Yeoju Sports Complex | 10,180 |

=== Foreign players ===
The number of foreign players was restricted to three per team, or four per team if one player was from an AFC country.

| Club | Player 1 | Player 2 | Player 3 | AFC player | Former player(s) |
|---|---|---|---|---|---|
| Busan Transportation Corporation | (Germany) Jan Rabens | | | | |
| Changwon FC | (Brazil) Felipe Fonseca | | | | |
| Chuncheon FC | (Brazil) Felipe Machado | (Brazil) Klysman | (South Sudan) Martin Sawi | (Japan) Reo Nishiguchi | |
| FC Mokpo | (Nigeria) Uzo Michael | | | | |
| Gangneung Citizen | (Brazil) Lucão | (Brazil) Careca | | | |
| Gimhae FC 2008 | (Japan) Kaisei Ishii | | | | |
| Gyeongju KHNP | (Brazil) Victor Ribeiro | (Brazil) Denzel | (Brazil) Camilo | | |
| Paju Citizen | (Nigeria) Yuri | (Nigeria) Matheus Devellard | | | |
| Siheung Citizen | (Brazil) Sandy | | | (Japan) Haruto Tanaka | |
| Yangpyeong FC | (Brazil) Richard Luca | (Brazil) Joaninha | | | |

== League table ==
| Pos | Team | Pld | W | D | L | GF | GA | GD | Pts | Promotion or relegation |
|---|---|---|---|---|---|---|---|---|---|---|
| 1 | Gimhae FC 2008 (C, P) | 28 | 18 | 7 | 3 | 48 | 20 | +28 | 61 | Promotion to K League 2 (Note: Promoted after getting a license for K League 2.) |
| 2 | Siheung Citizen | 28 | 17 | 6 | 5 | 45 | 25 | +20 | 57 | |
| 3 | Pocheon Citizen | 28 | 16 | 7 | 5 | 47 | 28 | +19 | 55 | |
| 4 | Daejeon Korail | 28 | 14 | 7 | 7 | 48 | 32 | +16 | 49 | |
| 5 | Gyeongju KHNP | 28 | 12 | 9 | 7 | 34 | 29 | +5 | 45 | |
| 6 | Busan Transportation Corporation | 28 | 14 | 2 | 12 | 35 | 34 | +1 | 44 | |
| 7 | Changwon FC | 28 | 12 | 7 | 9 | 31 | 23 | +8 | 43 | |
| 8 | Yangpyeong FC | 28 | 13 | 4 | 11 | 27 | 24 | +3 | 43 | |
| 9 | Yeoju FC | 28 | 10 | 6 | 12 | 31 | 35 | −4 | 36 | |
| 10 | Paju Citizen (P) | 28 | 10 | 6 | 12 | 27 | 32 | −5 | 36 | Promotion to K League 2 |
| 11 | Gangneung Citizen | 28 | 8 | 7 | 13 | 38 | 45 | −7 | 31 | |
| 12 | Chuncheon FC | 28 | 9 | 3 | 16 | 27 | 37 | −10 | 30 | |
| 13 | Ulsan Citizen | 28 | 5 | 6 | 17 | 20 | 38 | −18 | 21 | |
| 14 | Jeonbuk Hyundai Motors N | 28 | 5 | 5 | 18 | 28 | 51 | −23 | 20 | |
| 15 | FC Mokpo (O) | 28 | 4 | 4 | 20 | 18 | 51 | −33 | 16 | Qualification for relegation play-off |

Source: JoinKFA Sofascore
Rules for classification: 1) Points; 2) Goal difference; 3) Goals scored; 4) Wins
(C) Champions; (O) Play-off winners; (P) Promoted

== Results ==
| Home \ Away | BTC | CW | CC | DJK | GNC | GH | GJK | JBH | MP | PJC | PCC | SHC | USC | YP | YJ |
|---|---|---|---|---|---|---|---|---|---|---|---|---|---|---|---|
| Busan Transportation Corporation | — | 2–1 | 0–1 | 1–2 | 2–0 | 0–1 | 2–1 | 2–1 | 2–1 | 1–2 | 2–1 | 0–1 | 2–1 | 0–0 | 1–1 |
| Changwon FC | 3–0 | — | 2–1 | 0–0 | 2–1 | 0–1 | 0–0 | 3–1 | 0–0 | 0–1 | 1–2 | 1–2 | 2–1 | 1–0 | 2–1 |
| Chuncheon FC | 0–3 | 2–4 | — | 0–1 | 1–2 | 0–1 | 1–0 | 3–1 | 3–2 | 0–3 | 0–1 | 1–2 | 0–0 | 1–0 | 1–2 |
| Daejeon Korail | 2–0 | 1–1 | 0–1 | — | 1–1 | 0–0 | 2–0 | 2–1 | 0–1 | 2–0 | 2–0 | 2–3 | 3–0 | 1–0 | 3–3 |
| Gangneung Citizen | 2–1 | 1–0 | 2–4 | 4–3 | — | 1–1 | 1–3 | 3–1 | 3–1 | 1–1 | 0–1 | 2–2 | 2–2 | 3–1 | 1–1 |
| Gimhae FC 2008 | 5–1 | 2–1 | 3–1 | 3–0 | 2–0 | — | 1–3 | 2–2 | 4–0 | 2–0 | 1–2 | 1–1 | 0–0 | 3–0 | 1–1 |
| Gyeongju KHNP | 1–0 | 0–0 | 0–0 | 2–1 | 2–1 | 3–1 | — | 2–1 | 2–0 | 1–1 | 0–3 | 2–3 | 2–2 | 0–0 | 0–1 |
| Jeonbuk Hyundai Motors N | 0–1 | 0–2 | 2–1 | 2–2 | 2–1 | 1–2 | 0–1 | — | 1–3 | 1–1 | 1–3 | 0–3 | 0–1 | 2–1 | 2–4 |
| FC Mokpo | 1–3 | 0–2 | 1–0 | 3–2 | 2–1 | 0–1 | 0–1 | 1–1 | — | 0–2 | 0–0 | 0–4 | 1–2 | 0–2 | 0–3 |
| Paju Citizen | 0–1 | 0–0 | 0–1 | 1–2 | 2–1 | 1–2 | 0–0 | 4–0 | 2–0 | — | 0–4 | 0–4 | 1–1 | 0–1 | 2–0 |
| Pocheon Citizen | 3–1 | 1–0 | 1–0 | 2–6 | 3–1 | 1–1 | 3–3 | 1–1 | 1–1 | 3–0 | — | 2–3 | 0–0 | 1–0 | 2–0 |
| Siheung Citizen | 0–3 | 2–0 | 1–0 | 1–1 | 0–1 | 1–2 | 0–0 | 1–0 | 3–1 | 2–0 | 1–1 | — | 2–1 | 0–0 | 0–1 |
| Ulsan Citizen | 0–1 | 0–1 | 1–3 | 1–2 | 1–0 | 0–1 | 3–4 | 0–3 | 1–0 | 0–1 | 1–2 | 0–1 | — | 0–1 | 0–1 |
| Yangpyeong FC | 2–0 | 0–0 | 2–1 | 1–2 | 2–1 | 0–2 | 0–1 | 2–1 | 2–1 | 3–1 | 1–2 | 2–0 | 2–0 | — | 1–0 |
| Yeoju FC | 1–3 | 1–2 | 0–0 | 0–3 | 1–1 | 0–2 | 1–0 | 2–0 | 3–1 | 0–2 | 1–0 | 1–2 | 1–2 | 0–1 | — |

Source: JoinKFA Sofascore
Legend: Blue = home team win; Yellow = draw; Red = away team win.

== Relegation play-off ==
The relegation play-off was contested between the 15th-placed team of K3 League and the runners-up of K4 League.

22 November 2025
14:00 UTC+9

| FC Mokpo | 1–0 | Namyangju FC |
|---|---|---|
| Ryu Yeon-joon 63' | Report |

Mokpo International Football Center, Mokpo

== See also ==
- 2025 in South Korean football
- 2025 K League 2
- 2025 K4 League
- 2025 Korea Cup
