= Gun (Korean name) =

- Hangul: 건
- RR: Geon
- MR: Kŏn
- IPA: [kʌn]

Gun, also spelled Geon, Kŏn, Keon, Gon, Kuhn, or Kun, is a Korean given name. Notable people with the name include:

- Yi Geon (1909–1990), Korean prince
- Kang Kon (1918–1950), Korean military leader
- Goh Kun (born 1938), South Korean politician
- Shin Kuhn (1941–2015), South Korean lawyer and politician
- Cui Jian (born 1961), Chinese musician
- Yoo Gun (born Jo Jeong-ik, 1983), American-born South Korean actor
- Heo Keon (born 1988), South Korean football player
- Park Gon (born 1990), South Korean football player
- Lee Geon (footballer) (born 1996), South Korean football player
- So Geon (born 2006), member of idol group NEXZ

== See also ==
- Gun, a character from the horror comic series Witch Creek Road
- List of Korean given names
