= Lee Rae-jun =

South Korean footballer (born 1997)

Personal information
- Date of birth: 19 March 1997 (age 29)
- Place of birth: Busan, South Korea
- Height: 1.92 m (6 ft 4 in)
- Position: Midfielder

Team information
- Current team: Hwaseong
- Number: 97

Youth career
- 2013–2015: Dongnae HS

Senior career*
Years	Team	Apps	(Gls)
2016–2018	Pohang Steelers	7	(0)
2019	Tochigi SC	4	(0)
2020	Ansan Greeners	9	(1)
2020–2022	Busan IPark	17	(0)
2022	Daejeon Korail	5	(1)
2023	Yeoju FC	27	(12)
2024–2025	Jinju Citizen	20	(10)
2025	Siheung Citizen	22	(15)
2026	Gimhae FC	14	(2)
2026–	Hwaseong	2	(0)
- * Club domestic league appearances and goals as of 5 August 2026

- Lee Rae-jun
- Hangul: 이래준
- Hanja: 李來俊
- RR: I Raejun
- MR: I Raejun

Lee Rae-jun (Korean: 이래준; born 19 March 1997) is a South Korean footballer who currently play as a midfielder for K League 2 club, Hwaseong.

== Career ==
In 2025, Lee Rae-jun signed to K3 League club, Siheung Citizen. He was top scorer in 2025 season with 15 goals from 22 appearances.

On 1 January 2026, Lee Rae-jun was announce official transfer to K League 2 promoted club, Gimhae FC for 2026 season.

== Career statistics ==
=== Club ===
As of the start for 2026 season.

Club	Season	League			National Cup		League Cup		Other		Total	
Club	Season	Division	Apps	Goals	Apps	Goals	Apps	Goals	Apps	Goals	Apps	Goals
Pohang Steelers	2016	K League Classic	0	0	0	0	–		0	0	0	0
Pohang Steelers	2017	K League Classic	4	0	0	0	–		0	0	4	0
Pohang Steelers	2018	K League 1	3	0	1 (Note: Appearances in the Korean FA Cup)	0	–		0	0	4	0
Pohang Steelers	Total		7	0	1	0	0	0	0	0	8	0
Tochigi SC	2019	J3 League	4	0	0	0	–		0	0	4	0
Ansan Greeners	2020	K League 2	9	1	1	0	–		0	0	10	1
Busan IPark	2020	K League 1	0	0	0	0	–		0	0	0	0
Busan IPark	2021	K League 2	17	0	2	0	–		0	0	19	0
Busan IPark	Total		17	0	2	0	0	0	0	0	19	0
Daejeon Korail	2022	K3 League	5	1	0	0	–		0	0	5	1
Yeoju FC	2023	K4 League	27	12	1	0	–		0	0	28	12
Jinju Citizen	2024	K4 League	18	10	2	2	–		0	0	20	12
Jinju Citizen	2025	K4 League	2	0	2	1	–		0	0	4	1
Siheung Citizen	2025	K3 League	22	15	1	0	–		0	0	23	15
Gimhae FC	2026	K League 2	0	0	0	0	–		0	0	0	0
Career total			111	39	10	3	0	0	0	0	121	42

== Honours ==
- Yeoju FC
  - K4 League: 2023

=== Individual ===
- K3 League top scorer: 2025
