= Denzel (footballer) =

Brazilian footballer

Personal information
- Full name: Denzel Nogueira Damasceno
- Date of birth: 20 January 2003 (age 23)
- Place of birth: Taboão da Serra, Brazil
- Height: 1.91 m (6 ft 3 in)
- Position: Forward

Team information
- Current team: Yangpyeong
- Number: 90

Youth career
- 2013–2014: Santos
- 2016: Corinthians
- 2018: Internacional
- 2020–2022: São Paulo
- 2022: → Ituano (loan)
- 2023–2024: Goiás

Senior career*
Years	Team	Apps	(Gls)
2022	São Paulo	0	(0)
2022	→ Ituano (loan)	1	(0)
2023–2024	Goiás	4	(0)
2025–	Yangpyeong	11	(3)
- * Club domestic league appearances and goals as of 01:54, 28 July 2025 (UTC)

Denzel Nogueira Damasceno (born 20 January 2003), simply known as Denzel, is a Brazilian professional footballer who plays as a forward for K3 League club Yangpyeong FC.

== Club career ==
Born in Taboão da Serra, São Paulo, Denzel played for the youth sides of Santos, Corinthians, Internacional and São Paulo before joining Ituano's under-20 team in the 2022, on loan. He made his first team debut with the latter club on 11 June 2022, coming on as a late substitute for goalscorer Rafael Elias in a 1–0 Série B away win over Brusque.

In January 2023, Denzel joined Goiás and was initially assigned back to the under-20 squad. He made his first team – and Série A – debut on 20 September, replacing Matheus Babi in a 0–0 home draw against Flamengo.

== Career statistics ==
As of 27 July 2025

Club	Season	League			State League		Cup		Continental		Other		Total	
Club	Season	Division	Apps	Goals	Apps	Goals	Apps	Goals	Apps	Goals	Apps	Goals	Apps	Goals
Ituano	2022	Série B	1	0	—		—		—		—		1	0
Goiás	2023	Série A	1	0	0	0	0	0	0	0	—		1	0
Goiás	2024	Série B	1	0	2	0	0	0	—		0	0	3	0
Goiás	Total		2	0	2	0	0	0	0	0	0	0	4	0
Yangpyeong	2025	K3 League	11	3	—		1	0	—		—		12	3
Career total			14	3	2	0	1	0	0	0	0	0	17	3
