= Martin Sawi =

South Sudanese footballer (born 1999)

Personal information
- Full name: Martin Dominic Martin Hassan
- Date of birth: 16 September 1999 (age 27)
- Place of birth: Alexandria, Egypt
- Position: Midfielder

Team information
- Current team: Ulsan Citizen FC
- Number: 11

Youth career
- Young Stars
- 2016–2018: Ansan Greeners

Senior career*
Years	Team	Apps	(Gls)
2018–2019	Goyang Citizen	35	(19)
2020	Yangju Citizen	18	(4)
2021	Ulsan Citizen	1	(0)
2022	FC Namdong		
2023-	Pyeongchang United		

International career^{‡}
2018	South Sudan U23	1	(0)
2019–	South Sudan	3	(0)
- * Club domestic league appearances and goals as of 05:02, 8 June 2021 (UTC) ‡ National team caps and goals as of 19:00, 20 July 2024 (UTC)

Martin Dominic Martin Hassan (born 16 September 1999) is a South Sudanese footballer who plays as a midfielder for South Korean club Pyeongchang United FC and the South Sudan national team.

== Club career ==
Sawi began his career at the South Sudanese club Young Stars, before moving to South Korea in 2016 to sign for Ansan Greeners. In 2018, Sawi signed up as a Goyang Citizen. In January 2020, after scoring 19 goals in 35 appearances for Goyang, Sawi signed for K3 League club Yangju Citizen.

== International career ==
In November 2018, Sawi made an appearance for South Sudan's under-23 team against Uganda at Juba Stadium. On 17 November 2019, Sawi made his debut for South Sudan in a 2–1 loss against Burkina Faso.
