= 2019 Korean FA Cup =

2019 KEB Hana Bank FA Cup

Tournament details
- Country: South Korea
- Dates: 9 March – 10 November 2019
- Teams: 86

Final positions
- Champions: Suwon Samsung Bluewings (5th title)
- Runners-up: Daejeon Korail
- AFC Champions League: Suwon Samsung Bluewings

Tournament statistics
- Top goal scorer: Yeom Ki-hun (5 goals)

Awards
- Best player: Ko Seung-beom

The 2019 Korean FA Cup, known as the 2019 KEB Hana Bank FA Cup, was the 24th edition of the Korean FA Cup.

Daegu FC were the defending champions, but were eliminated in the round of 16 by Gyeongnam FC. Suwon Samsung Bluewings qualified for the group stage of the 2020 AFC Champions League after becoming eventual champions.

== Schedule ==
Round	Date	Matches	Clubs remaining	Clubs involved	New entries this round
First round	9–10 March	17	86	34	16 university teams 8 K3 League Basic teams 10 other amateur teams
Second round	14–16 March	17	69	17+17	10 university teams 7 K3 League Advanced teams
Third round	26–27 March	20	52	17+23	10 K League 2 teams 8 Korea National League teams 5 K3 League Advanced teams
Round of 32	17 April	16	32	20+12	12 K League 1 teams
Round of 16	15 May	8	16	16	None
Quarter-finals	2–3 July	4	8	8	None
Semi-finals	18 September – 2 October	4	4	4	None
Final	6–10 November	2	2	2	None

== Qualifying rounds ==
=== First round ===
9 March 2019	Hongik University	0–1	Dongguk University
12:00		Report

9 March 2019	Jungnang Chorus Mustang	0–1	SMC Engineering
13:00		Report

9 March 2019	Honam University	2–0	Byeoksan Players
14:00		Report

9 March 2019	Ajou University	3–0	Yangju Citizen
14:00		Report

9 March 2019	Mokpo Christian Hospital	1–0	Pyeongchang FC
14:00		Report

9 March 2019	Gimhae College	7–0	Ansan Gakgol
14:00		Report

9 March 2019	Goyang Citizen	2–3	Seoul United
14:00		Report

9 March 2019	Sangji University	2–1	Chodang University
14:00		Report

9 March 2019	Jeonju University	3–1	Kwangwoon University
15:00		Report

9 March 2019	Kyung Hee University	2–1	Gwangju Bukgu Marines
15:30		Report

9 March 2019	Dongducheon One Team	1–3	Dongwoo Fine-Chem
18:00		Report

9 March 2019	Ulsan Citizen	0–0 (a.e.t.) (4–5 p)	Yonsei University
19:00		Report

10 March 2019	Pai Chai University	1–3	Yeoju Sejong
13:00		Report

10 March 2019	Jeonju Citizen	2–1	Dongshin University
14:00		Report

10 March 2019	Yongin Citizen	0–2	Gwangju University
14:00		Report

10 March 2019	Songwol	1–3	Dong-Eui University
14:00		Report

10 March 2019	Daedeok Winnerstar	0–1	Andong Science College
16:00		Report

=== Second round ===
16 March 2019	SMC Engineering	1–3	Yong In University
		Report

16 March 2019	University of Ulsan	0–3	Yangpyeong FC
		Report

16 March 2019	Catholic Kwandong University	0–1	Jeonju University
		Report

16 March 2019	Yeoju Sejong	0–2	Andong Science College
		Report

16 March 2019	Dongwoo Fine-Chem	0–5	Chungju Citizen
		Report

16 March 2019	Siheung Citizen	0–1	Jeonju Citizen
		Report

14 March 2019	Ajou University	1–0	Cheongju University
		Report

16 March 2019	Yonsei University	3–1	Dongguk University
		Report

16 March 2019	Seoul United	1–3 (a.e.t.)	Soongsil University
		Report

16 March 2019	Mokpo Christian Hospital	1–6	Hwaseong FC
		Report

16 March 2019	Chung-Ang University	0–3	Cheongju FC
		Report

16 March 2019	Pyeongtaek Citizen	1–1 (a.e.t.) (4–5 p)	Honam University
		Report

15 March 2019	Sangji University	1–1 (a.e.t.) (3–5 p)	Dankook University
		Report

16 March 2019	Kyung Hee University	0–1 (a.e.t.)	Incheon National University
		Report

16 March 2019	Gimhae College	1–2	Yeungnam University
		Report

16 March 2019	Gwangju University	1–3	Paju Citizen
		Report

16 March 2019	Hanyang University	3–2	Dong-Eui University
		Report

=== Third round ===
27 March 2019	Yangpyeong FC	0–0 (a.e.t.) (5–4 p)	Asan Mugunghwa
		Report

27 March 2019	Busan IPark	0–1	Cheonan City
		Report

27 March 2019	Gwangju FC	1–0	Jeonnam Dragons
		Report

27 March 2019	Gimpo Citizen	4–0	Yonsei University
		Report

27 March 2019	Soongsil University	0–0 (a.e.t.) (7–8 p)	Yeungnam University
		Report

27 March 2019	Paju Citizen	4–0	Ajou University
		Report

26 March 2019	Andong Science College	2–2 (a.e.t.) (4–3 p)	Yong In University
		Report

27 March 2019	Jeonju Citizen	0–1	Mokpo City
		Report

27 March 2019	Chungju Citizen	0–6	Suwon FC
		Report

27 March 2019	Gyeongju KHNP	3–2 (a.e.t.)	Busan Transportation Corporation
		Report

27 March 2019	Cheongju FC	1–0	Incheon National University
		Report

27 March 2019	Daejeon Korail	2–1 (a.e.t.)	Jeonju University
		Report

27 March 2019	Dankook University	0–0 (a.e.t.) (4–3 p)	Daejeon Citizen
		Report

27 March 2019	Changwon City	3–0	Hanyang University
		Report

27 March 2019	FC Anyang	5–1	Icheon Citizen
		Report

27 March 2019	Hwaseong FC	3–2	Ansan Greeners
		Report

27 March 2019	Pocheon Citizen	1–1 (a.e.t.) (2–1 p)	Gimhae FC
		Report

27 March 2019	Gyeongju Citizen	0–1 (a.e.t.)	Gangneung City
		Report

27 March 2019	Bucheon FC 1995	1–3 (a.e.t.)	Seoul E-Land
		Report

27 March 2019	Honam University	1–0	Chuncheon FC
		Report

== Final rounds ==
The draw was held on 4 April 2019.

=== Bracket ===
Round of 32
Suwon Samsung Bluewings	1
Pohang Steelers	0
Gwangju FC (p)	2 (4)
Andong Science College	2 (3)
Gyeongju KHNP	2
Gimpo Citizen	1
Incheon United	0
Cheongju FC	1
Suwon FC	1
Daegu FC	2
Gyeongnam FC	2
Pocheon Citizen	1
Hwaseong FC	5
Yangpyeong FC	2
Cheonan City (a.e.t.)	1
Mokpo City	0
Sangju Sangmu (p)	0 (10)
Seongnam FC	0 (9)
Jeju United (p)	1 (4)
Gangneung City	1 (2)
Jeonbuk Hyundai Motors	0
FC Anyang	1
Changwon City	2
Yeungnam University	1
Gangwon FC	3
FC Seoul	2
Paju Citizen	2
Dankook University	0
Seoul E-Land	1
Honam University	0
Ulsan Hyundai	0
Daejeon Korail	2

Round of 16
Suwon Samsung Bluewings	3
Gwangju FC	0
Gyeongju KHNP	2
Cheongju FC	0
Daegu FC	0
Gyeongnam FC	2
Hwaseong FC (p)	2 (4)
Cheonan City	2 (3)
Sangju Sangmu (p)	1 (13)
Jeju United	1 (12)
FC Anyang	1
Changwon City (a.e.t.)	2
Gangwon FC	2
Paju Citizen	0
Seoul E-Land	0
Daejeon Korail	2

Quarter-finals
Suwon Samsung Bluewings (p)	2 (3)
Gyeongju KHNP	2 (1)
Gyeongnam FC	1
Hwaseong FC	2
Sangju Sangmu	2
Changwon City	1
Gangwon FC	0
Daejeon Korail	2

Semi-finals
18 September, 2 October
Suwon Samsung Bluewings (a.e.t.)	0	3	3
Hwaseong FC	1	0	1
18 September, 2 October
Sangju Sangmu	1	2	3 (2)
Daejeon Korail (p)	1	2	3 (4)

Final
6, 10 November
Suwon Samsung Bluewings	0	4	4
Daejeon Korail	0	0	0

=== Round of 32 ===
17 April 2019	Gwangju FC	2–2 (a.e.t.) (4–3 p)	Andong Science College	Gwangju World Cup Stadium, Gwangju
		Report

17 April 2019	Cheonan City	1–0 (a.e.t.)	Mokpo City	Cheonan Football Center, Cheonan
		Report

17 April 2019	Gyeongju KHNP	2–1	Gimpo Citizen	Gyeongju Civic Stadium, Gyeongju
		Report

17 April 2019	Suwon Samsung Bluewings	1–0	Pohang Steelers	Suwon World Cup Stadium, Suwon
		Report

17 April 2019	Paju Citizen	2–0	Dankook University	Paju Public Stadium, Paju
		Report

17 April 2019	Gangwon FC	3–2	FC Seoul	Chuncheon Songam Leports Town, Chuncheon
		Report

17 April 2019	Daejeon Korail	2–0	Ulsan Hyundai	Daejeon Hanbat Sports Complex, Daejeon
		Report

17 April 2019	Hwaseong FC	5–2	Yangpyeong FC	Hwaseong Stadium, Hwaseong
		Report

17 April 2019	Sangju Sangmu	0–0 (a.e.t.) (10–9 p)	Seongnam FC	Sangju Civic Stadium, Sangju
		Report

17 April 2019	Changwon City	2–1	Yeungnam University	Changwon Sports Park, Changwon
		Report

17 April 2019	Incheon United	0–1	Cheongju FC	Incheon Football Stadium, Incheon
		Report

17 April 2019	Gangneung City	1–1 (a.e.t.) (2–4 p)	Jeju United	Gangneung Stadium, Gangneung
		Report

17 April 2019	Suwon FC	1–2	Daegu FC	Suwon Sports Complex, Suwon
		Report

17 April 2019	Jeonbuk Hyundai Motors	0–1	FC Anyang	Jeonju World Cup Stadium, Jeonju
		Report	Manuel Palacios 80'

17 April 2019	Gyeongnam FC	2–1	Pocheon Citizen	Changwon Football Center, Changwon
		Report

17 April 2019	Honam University	0–1	Seoul E-Land	Honam University Stadium, Gwangju
		Report

=== Round of 16 ===
15 May 2019	Gangwon FC	2–0	Paju Citizen	Chuncheon Songam Leports Town, Chuncheon
19:00 UTC+9		Report

15 May 2019	FC Anyang	1–2 (a.e.t.)	Changwon City	Anyang Stadium, Anyang
19:30 UTC+9		Report

15 May 2019	Gyeongju KHNP	2–0	Cheongju FC	Gyeongju Civic Stadium, Gyeongju
19:00 UTC+9		Report

15 May 2019	Daejeon Korail	2–0	Seoul E-Land	Daejeon Hanbat Sports Complex, Daejeon
19:00 UTC+9		Report

15 May 2019	Sangju Sangmu	1–1 (a.e.t.) (13–12 p)	Jeju United FC	Sangju Civic Stadium, Sangju
19:00 UTC+9	? 89'	Report	? 51'

15 May 2019	Suwon Samsung Bluewings	3–0	Gwangju FC	Suwon World Cup Stadium, Suwon
19:30 UTC+9	Shin Se-gye 42'; Sarić 48'; Han Eui-kwon 86'	Report

15 May 2019	Hwaseong FC	2–2 (a.e.t.) (4–3 p)	Cheonan City	Hwaseong Stadium, Hwaseong
19:00 UTC+9		Report

15 May 2019	Gyeongnam FC	2–0	Daegu FC	Changwon Football Center, Changwon
19:00 UTC+9		Report

=== Quarter-finals ===
2 July 2019	Changwon City	1–2	Sangju Sangmu	Changwon Football Center, Changwon
	Jung Gi-woon 90+2' (pen.)	Report	Jin Seong-uk 54'; Sin Chang-moo 88' (pen.)

3 July 2019	Gyeongnam FC	1–2	Hwaseong FC	Changwon Football Center, Changwon
	Kim Seung-jun 60' (pen.)	Report	Yoo Byung-soo 19'; Moon Jun-ho 49'

3 July 2019	Suwon Samsung Bluewings	2–2 (a.e.t.) (3–1 p)	Gyeongju KHNP	Suwon World Cup Stadium, Suwon
	Taggart 12'; Ko Myeong-seok 112'	Report	Lim Seong-taek 45+1'; Kim Min-kyu 102'

3 July 2019	Daejeon Korail	2–0	Gangwon FC	Daejeon Hanbat Stadium, Daejeon
	Lee Keun-won 67'; Lee Gwang-pyo 90+2'	Report

=== Semi-finals ===
18 September 2019 First leg	Daejeon Korail	1–1	Sangju Sangmu	Daejeon Hanbat Stadium, Daejeon
19:00	Lee Keun-won 90+3'	Report	Ryu Seung-woo 68'

18 September 2019 First leg	Hwaseong FC	1–0	Suwon Samsung Bluewings	Hwaseong Stadium, Hwaseong
19:00	Moon Jun-ho 24'	Report

2 October 2019 Second leg	Sangju Sangmu	2–2 (a.e.t.) (3–3 agg.) (2–4 p)	Daejeon Korail	Sangju Civic Stadium, Sangju
19:00	Kim Jin-hyeok 90+2'; Kang Sang-woo 102' (pen.)	Report	Jang Won-seok 89'; Lee Kyung-min 106'	Attendance: 519
	Penalties
	Kim Geon-hee (penalty missed); Lee Chan-dong (penalty scored); Goh Tae-won (penalty scored); Kim Gyeong-joong (penalty missed)		Jang Won-seok (penalty scored); Gwak Cheol-ho (penalty scored); Lee Geun-won (penalty scored); Kim Sang-kyun (penalty missed); Lee Gwang-pyo (penalty scored)

2 October 2019 Second leg	Suwon Samsung Bluewings	3–0 (a.e.t.) (3–1 agg.)	Hwaseong FC	Suwon World Cup Stadium, Suwon
19:30	Yeom Ki-hun 59', 107', 110' (pen.)	Report		Attendance: 4,358

=== Final ===
6 November 2019 First leg	Daejeon Korail	0–0	Suwon Samsung Bluewings	Daejeon Hanbat Stadium, Daejeon
19:00				Referee: Kim Hee-gon

10 November 2019 Second leg	Suwon Samsung Bluewings	4–0 (4–0 agg.)	Daejeon Korail	Suwon World Cup Stadium, Suwon
14:10				Referee: Park Byung-jin

== See also ==
- 2019 in South Korean football
- 2019 K League 1
- 2019 K League 2
- 2019 Korea National League
- 2019 K3 League Advanced
- 2019 K3 League Basic
