= 2019 K3 League Advanced =

K3 League Advanced
- Season: 2019
- Dates: 23 March – November 2019
- Champions: Hwaseong FC (2nd title)
- Matches: 132
- Goals: 351 (2.66 per match)
- Best player: Moon Joon-ho
- Top goalscorer: Bae Chun-suk

The 2019 K3 League Advanced was the 13th and last season of the amateur K3 League. After the end of the 2019 season, the K3 League was relaunched as a semi-professional league by the Korea Football Association (KFA).

Icheon Citizen abandoned the last three matches of the regular season to avoid the spread of the African swine fever virus, which could damage pig farms in Icheon.

== Teams ==
Club	City	Stadium	Capacity	Manager
Cheongju FC	Cheongju	Cheongju Stadium	17,264	(South Korea) Kwon Oh-gyu
Chuncheon FC	Chuncheon	Chuncheon Stadium	20,000	(South Korea) Kim Yong-ho
Chungju Citizen	Chungju	Chungju Stadium	15,000	(South Korea) Gong Mun-bae
Gimpo Citizen	Gimpo	Gimpo Sports Complex	5,068	(South Korea) Oh Jong-yeol
Gyeongju Citizen	Gyeongju	Gyeongju Civic Stadium	12,199	(South Korea) Kim Dae-geon
Hwaseong FC	Hwaseong	Hwaseong Stadium	35,270	(South Korea) Kim Seong-nam
Icheon Citizen	Icheon	Icheon Stadium	20,305	(South Korea) Lee Yeong-gi
Paju Citizen	Paju	Paju Public Stadium	22,000	(South Korea) Oh Won-jae
Pocheon Citizen	Pocheon	Pocheon Stadium	7,000	(South Korea) Kim Jae-hyeong
Pyeongtaek Citizen	Pyeongtaek	Sosabeol Reports Town	15,000	(South Korea) Lee Seong-gyun
Siheung Citizen	Siheung	Jeongwang Sports Park		(South Korea) Jung Sun-woo
Yangpyeong FC	Yangpyeong	Yongmun Sports Park	400	(South Korea) Kim Gyeong-bum

== League table ==
Pos	Team	Pld	W	D	L	GF	GA	GD	Pts	Qualification
1	Hwaseong FC (C)	22	16	2	4	44	19	+25	50	Qualification for Championship final
2	Gyeongju Citizen	22	14	4	4	36	21	+15	46	Qualification for Championship first round
3	Gimpo Citizen	22	12	6	4	28	19	+9	42	Qualification for Championship first round
4	Yangpyeong FC	22	13	2	7	42	30	+12	41	Qualification for Championship first round and K4 League (Note: Qualified after getting a license for K4 League.)
5	Pocheon Citizen	22	12	3	7	30	21	+9	39	Qualification for Championship first round and K4 League
6	Paju Citizen	22	11	2	9	30	26	+4	35	Qualification for K4 League (Note: Qualified after getting a license for K4 League.)
7	Siheung Citizen	22	8	5	9	22	25	−3	29	Qualification for K4 League
8	Cheongju FC	22	8	4	10	29	32	−3	28	
9	Icheon Citizen	22	7	6	9	27	33	−6	27	Qualification for K4 League
10	Chuncheon FC	22	4	3	15	23	38	−15	15	
11	Pyeongtaek Citizen	22	3	2	17	23	47	−24	11	
12	Chungju Citizen (Note: Chungju Citizen was deducted 10 points.)	22	3	3	16	17	40	−23	2	Qualification for K4 League

Source: Soccerway KFA
Rules for classification: 1) Points; 2) Goal difference; 3) Goals scored
(C) Champions

== Relegation playoff ==
The promotion-relegation playoff was contested between winners of Basic league playoff and 10th-placed team of Advanced league, but the match became meaningless after Korea Football Association decided to examine every K3 League club for qualification for newly-founded K3 League or K4 League.

3 November 2019
14:00 KST

Chuncheon FC	0–0	Yangju Citizen
	Report

Gongjicheon Football Field
Attendance: 234
Referee: Park Young-rok

== Championship playoffs ==
When the first round and semi-final matches were finished as draws, their winners were decided on the regular season rankings without extra time and the penalty shoot-out.

=== Bracket ===
First round
Gyeongju Citizen	1
Pocheon Citizen	3
Gimpo Citizen	0
Yangpyeong FC	1

Semi-final
Yangpyeong FC	3
Pocheon Citizen	0

Final
Hwaseong FC	1	1	2
Yangpyeong FC	0	0	0

=== First round ===
26 October 2019
14:00 KST

Gyeongju Citizen	1–3	Pocheon Citizen
Kim Jin-yung 20'	Report	Lee Soon-min 6'; Kim Seul-ki 16'; Kim Kung-hoon 60'

Gyeongju Civic Stadium
Attendance: 655
Referee: Choi Kyu-hyun

26 October 2019
14:00 KST

Gimpo Citizen	0–1	Yangpyeong FC
	Report	Oh Dong-kyu 61'

Gimpo Sports Complex
Attendance: 359
Referee: Kim Jae-hong

=== Semi-final ===
2 November 2019
14:00 KST

Yangpyeong FC	3–0	Pocheon Citizen
Yoo Dong-kyu 12', 41'; Kim Tae-kung 18'	Report

Yongmun Sports Park
Attendance: 288
Referee: Woo Bung-hun

=== Final ===
9 November 2019
11:00 KST

Yangpyeong FC	0–1	Hwaseong FC
	Report	Park Jun-tae 77'

Yongmun Sports Park
Attendance: 657
Referee: Park Jin-ho

16 November 2019
11:00

Hwaseong FC	1–0	Yangpyeong FC
Moon Jun-tae 71'	Report

Hwaseong Stadium
Attendance: 827
Referee: Lee Huk-jae

Hwaseong FC won 2–0 on aggregate.

== See also ==
- 2019 in South Korean football
- 2019 Korean FA Cup
