= 2020 K4 League =

K4 League
- Season: 2020
- Dates: 16 May – 22 November 2020
- Champions: Paju Citizen (1st title)
- Promoted: Paju Citizen; Ulsan Citizen
- Matches played: 157
- Goals scored: 482 (3.07 per match)
- Best Player: Heo Keon
- Top goalscorer: Yoo Dong-gyu (15 goals)

The 2020 K4 League is the first season of the K4 League. The K4 League was regarded as the successor to the K3 League Basic, which was abolished in 2019.

Five K3 League Advanced teams, six K3 League Basic teams and two newly-founded teams entered in the inaugural season. The 13 participating teams played each other twice. The top two teams could be directly promoted to the relaunched K3 League, and the third and fourth-placed teams qualified for the promotion play-offs.

== Teams ==
=== Stadiums and locations ===
Club	City	Stadium	Capacity
Chungju Citizen	Chungju	Chungju Tangeum Stadium	3,000
Goyang Citizen	Goyang	Eoulimnuri Byeolmuri Ground	2,500
Icheon Citizen	Icheon	Icheon City Stadium	20,305
Jinju Citizen	Jinju	Jinju Stadium	20,116
FC Namdong	Incheon	Namdong Industrial Complex Park	2,500
Paju Citizen	Paju	Paju Public Stadium	23,000
Pocheon Citizen	Pocheon	Pocheon Stadium	7,000
Seoul Jungnang	Seoul	Jungnang Public Ground	
Seoul Nowon United	Seoul	Nowon Madeul Stadium	446
Siheung Citizen	Siheung	Jeongwang Sports Park	1,500
Ulsan Citizen	Ulsan	Ulsan Stadium	19,471
Yangpyeong FC	Yangpyeong	Yongmun Sports Park	
Yeoju Citizen	Yeoju	Yeoju Stadium	16,000

=== Personnel ===
Club	Manager
Chungju Citizen	(South Korea) Gong Mun-bae
Goyang Citizen	(South Korea) Kim Young-ho
Icheon Citizen	(South Korea) Lee Cheon-hong
Jinju Citizen	(South Korea) Choi Cheong-il
FC Namdong	(South Korea) Kim Jeong-jae
Paju Citizen	(South Korea) Oh Won-jae
Pocheon Citizen	(South Korea) Cho Man-geun
Seoul Jungnang	(South Korea) Kim Sang-hwa
Seoul Nowon United	(South Korea) Lee Jeong-jae
Siheung Citizen	(South Korea) Jeong Seon-woo
Ulsan Citizen	(South Korea) Jung Jin-hyuk
Yangpyeong FC	(South Korea) Kim Chang-yoon
Yeoju Citizen	(South Korea) Shim Bong-seop

== League table ==
Pos	Team	Pld	W	D	L	GF	GA	GD	Pts	Qualification
1	Paju Citizen (C, P)	24	16	5	3	42	27	+15	53	Promotion to K3 League
2	Ulsan Citizen (P)	24	16	3	5	50	29	+21	51	Promotion to K3 League
3	Jinju Citizen	24	15	5	4	46	25	+21	50	Qualification for promotion play-offs
4	Pocheon Citizen	24	15	4	5	58	26	+32	49	Qualification for promotion play-offs
5	FC Namdong	24	13	2	9	46	27	+19	41	
6	Yeoju Citizen	24	12	3	9	37	36	+1	39	
7	Yangpyeong FC	24	11	3	10	28	28	0	36	
8	Siheung Citizen	24	8	5	11	35	31	+4	29	
9	Icheon Citizen	24	7	6	11	29	40	−11	27	
10	Chungju Citizen	24	5	4	15	24	45	−21	19	
11	Goyang Citizen	24	5	4	15	33	65	−32	19	
12	Seoul Nowon United	24	4	5	15	32	46	−14	17	
13	Seoul Jungnang	24	2	5	17	22	57	−35	11	

Source: Soccerway Official Instagram
Rules for classification: 1) Points; 2) Goal difference; 3) Head-to-head points; 4) Goals scored; 5) Wins
(C) Champions; (P) Promoted

== Results ==
Home \ Away	CHU	GC	ICH	JC	NAM	PC	POC	SJU	SNU	SC	ULC	YPY	YEO
Chungju Citizen	—	2–2	0–2	0–3	1–2	1–2	1–1	3–1	0–0	0–1	1–5	3–1	0–1
Goyang Citizen	0–1	—	3–4	1–3	0–4	0–3	3–0	1–1	3–4	2–0	1–3	1–2	3–2
Icheon Citizen	1–0	1–1	—	2–2	1–0	0–2	1–1	3–1	2–1	2–1	1–1	0–1	1–2
Jinju Citizen	2–0	4–1	3–2	—	4–1	0–1	0–0	1–0	1–1	1–1	2–3	1–0	1–2
FC Namdong	1–0	5–1	3–1	1–2	—	2–0	2–4	2–1	4–0	0–0	0–2	1–2	1–0
Paju Citizen	2–1	4–1	1–1	1–1	0–6	—	1–0	3–1	1–1	1–0	2–1	1–1	5–3
Pocheon Citizen	5–2	7–0	6–0	0–1	2–2	1–2	—	4–0	3–1	1–0	2–0	3–1	2–1
Seoul Jungnang	1–1	1–2	1–1		1–4	0–1	1–1	—	0–3	0–6	2–3	0–3	0–2
Seoul Nowon United	2–1	2–3	4–1	0–1	0–2	1–3	2–3	2–2	—	1–1	1–2	0–1	2–2
Siheung Citizen	3–4	5–0	1–1	1–2	0–2	3–2	2–1	4–2	1–1	—	1–2	1–0	0–1
Ulsan Citizen	4–1	3–2	1–0	1–3	3–1	1–2	0–2	2–0	3–1	2–0	—	0–0	4–2
Yangpyeong FC	2–0	3–1	2–1	1–3	1–0	0–1	1–4	2–2	2–1	1–0	0–1	—	0–1
Yeoju Citizen	0–1	1–1	1–0	3–2	1–0	1–1	1–3	1–2	2–1	0–0	2–2	2–1	—

Source: JoinKFA
Legend: Blue = home team win; Yellow = draw; Red = away team win.

== Promotion play-offs ==
=== Bracket ===
First round			Final
			K3	Gyeongju Citizen	2
3	Jinju Citizen	w/o	K4	Jinju Citizen	2
4	Pocheon Citizen	—

=== First round ===
The first round of promotion play-offs was contested between the third and fourth-placed teams, and its winners played the 14th-placed team of K3 League in the final (K3 League relegation play-off). Pocheon Citizen withdrew from the play-offs and so Jinju Citizen advanced to the final.

29 November 2020
14:00 KST

Jinju Citizen	Walkover	~~Pocheon Citizen~~

Venue Jinju Sports Complex
Attendance: 0
Referee: Park Myung-ho

=== Final ===
When the match was finished as a draw, both clubs remained in their respective leagues.

21 November 2020
14:00 KST

Gyeongju Citizen	2–2	Jinju Citizen
Min Jae-kwon 26'; Seong Jun-jeong 57' (pen.)		Cho Seong-wook 78'; Jun Beom-byun 90+1'

Gyeongju Civic Stadium
Attendance: 0
Referee: Choi Ki-chang

== See also ==
- 2020 in South Korean football
- 2020 Korean FA Cup
