= Heo Keon =

South Korean footballer

Personal information
- Full name: Heo Keon
- Date of birth: 3 January 1988 (age 38)
- Place of birth: South Korea
- Height: 1.84 m (6 ft 1/2 in)
- Position: Midfielder

Team information
- Current team: Bucheon FC
- Number: 25

Youth career
- Kwandong University

Senior career*
Years	Team	Apps	(Gls)
2009	Hongcheon Idu FC	11	(2)
2010	Yongin City	3	(0)
2011–2012	Cheonan City	32	(2)
2012–	Bucheon FC	18	(5)
- * Club domestic league appearances and goals as of 28 November 2014

Heo Keon (Korean: 허건; born 3 January 1988) is a South Korean footballer who played as midfielder for Bucheon FC 1995 in K League Challenge.

== Career ==
He joined Hongcheon Idu FC in 2009.

He made his debut goal in professional league at the opening match of 2013 K League Challenge against Suwon FC.
