= FC Namdong =

South Korean football club

FC Namdong FC 남동
- Full name: Football Club Namdong; FC 남동구민축구단
- Founded: 5 July 2019; 6 years ago
- Dissolved: 1 August 2022; 3 years ago
- Ground: Namdong Industrial Complex Park
- Capacity: 2,500
- Owner: Lee Kang-ho
- Manager: Kim Jeong-jae
- League: K4 League
- 2021: K4 League, 9th
- Website: http://www.fcnamdong.com/index.html

FC Namdong was a South Korean football club based in the district of Namdong-gu in the city of Incheon. The team was founded in 2019 and last played in the K4 League, a semi-professional league and the fourth tier of football in South Korea. In 2022, the club dissolved.

== History ==
On August 1, 2022, the club was dissolved.

However, they were not able to withstand the public opinion and headed towards disbanding the club as a result.

After inquiring about the disbandment with the Football Association and FC Namdong on August 16, the Football Association was expected to make a final decision. On August 19, 2022, the Football Association disqualified Namdong from its league membership, effectively confirming the dissolution of Namdong. At the same time, the club registration was canceled, allowing the transfer of 30 players at the time of disbandment.

== Season-by-season records ==
Season	Teams	League	Position	Pld	W	D	L	GF	GA	GD	Pts	FA Cup
2020	13	K4 League	5th	24	13	2	9	46	27	+19	41	DNQ
2021	16	K4 League	9th	30	11	3	16	39	47	–8	36	First round
2022	18	K4 League		34								First round

== See also ==
- List of football clubs in South Korea
