= Yeoju FC =

Association football club in South Korea

- Full name: Yeoju Football Club 여주 축구단
- Founded: September 10, 2017; 9 years ago, as Yeoju Citizen FC
- Ground: Yeoju Stadium
- Capacity: 16,000
- Manager: Shim Bong-Seop
- League: K3 League
- 2025: 9th or 10th of 15
Home colours	Away colours

Yeoju Football Club (Korean: 여주 FC) is a South Korean football club based in the city of Yeoju. The club is a member of the K3 League, the third tier of South Korean football as semi-professional.

== Current squad ==
As of 25 April 2024

Note: Flags indicate national team as defined under FIFA eligibility rules; some limited exceptions apply. Players may hold more than one non-FIFA nationality.

No.	Pos.	Nation	Player
1	GK	KOR	Gang Cha
2	DF	KOR	Lim Tae-seong
3	MF	KOR	Lee Jong-min
4	MF	KOR	Kim Ki-chan
5	DF	KOR	Ho-chang Choi
6	DF	KOR	Lee Dong-geon
7	MF	KOR	Lee Tae-hyung
8	MF	KOR	Hwang Sin-young
9	FW	BRA	Lucas Prati
10	FW	KOR	Kim Jae-cheol
11	FW	KOR	Lee Yu-chan
12	DF	KOR	Kim Seong-hyun
13	DF	KOR	Jang Won-jae
14	DF	KOR	Hyung-soo Kim
15	DF	KOR	Kim Min-kyeong
16	GK	KOR	Jun-seong Seo

No.	Pos.	Nation	Player
17	MF	KOR	Jeong Seo-woon
18	FW	KOR	Min-young Son
19	MF	KOR	Lee Yeong-chan
20	DF	KOR	Kim Jin-sung
21	DF	KOR	Lee Seung-jun
22	MF	KOR	Ji-man Ahn
23	MF	KOR	Kim Jin-cheol
24	FW	KOR	Kim Yu-seong
25	MF	KOR	Kim Won-sik
27	FW	KOR	Kim Ha-jun
28	MF	KOR	Lee Seung-min
30	MF	KOR	Choi Hyeong-woo
33	FW	KOR	Yoon Bo-ram
37	DF	KOR	Kim Jun-seop
66	DF	KOR	Kang Tae-uk
77	GK	KOR	Sang-jae Kim
90	FW	KOR	Lee Ho-jong
94	DF	KOR	Cho Sang-beom
99	FW	KOR	Oh Seong-ju

== Season-by-season records ==
Season	Teams	Tier	Placement	Pld	W	D	L	GF	GA	GD	Pts	FA Cup	Manager
2018	11	K3 League Basic	6th	20	11	1	8	50	29	+21	34	Third round	Oh Ju-po
2019	8	K3 League Basic	4th	21	12	2	7	57	25	+32	38	Second round	Oh Ju-po
2020	13	K4 League	6th	24	12	3	9	37	36	+1	39	Second round	Shim Bong-seop
2021	16	K4 League	12th	30	8	6	16	34	58	-24	30	First round	Shim Bong-seop
2022	16	K4 League	16th	32	8	3	21	36	57	-21	27	First round	Shim Bong-seop
2023	16	K4 League	1st	30	20	3	7	63	44	+19	63	Second round	Shim Bong-seop
2024	16	K3 League	11th	30	9	8	13	26	42	-16	35	Second round	Shim Bong-seop
2025	15	K3 League	9th/10th	28	10	6	12	31	35	-4	35	Second round	Shim Bong-seop
2026	14	K3 League										TBD round	Shim Bong-seop

== See also ==
- List of football clubs in South Korea
