= Ulsan Citizen FC =

South Korean football club

Ulsan Citizen
- Full name: Ulsan Citizen Football Club 울산 시민 축구단
- Short name: UCFC
- Founded: 22 December 2018; 7 years ago
- Ground: Ulsan Stadium
- Capacity: 19,471
- Owner: Mayor of Ulsan (Song Cheol-ho)
- Chairman: Chairman of Ulsan Football Association (Chung Tae-suk)
- Manager: Yoon Kyun-sang
- League: K3 League
- Website: http://www.ulsancitizen.com
Home colours	Away colours

Ulsan Citizen Football Club (Korean: 울산 시민 축구단) is a South Korean football club based in the city of Ulsan. The club plays in the K3 League, the third tier of associated football in South Korea. Following the club's foundation in 2018, it joined the K3 League Basic in the 2019 season, and was promoted to the rebranded K3 League in 2020 after finishing as runners-up in the inaugural season of the K4 League.

== Honours ==
- K3 League Basic
  - Winners (1): 2019
- K4 League
  - Winners (0):
  - Runner-up (1): 2020

== Season-by-season records ==
Season	Teams	League	Position	Pld	W	D	L	GF	GA	GD	Pts	FA Cup	Manager
2019	8	K3 League Basic	Champions↑	21	15	5	1	44	12	+32	50	First round	Yoon Kyun-sang
2020	13	K4 League	Runner-up↑	24	16	3	5	50	29	+21	51	Third round	Yoon Kyun-sang
2021	15	K3 League	7th	28	9	11	8	32	24	+8	38	First round	Yoon Kyun-sang
2022	16	K3 League	15th	30	6	10	14	29	48	-11	28	Round of 16	Yoon Kyun-sang
2023	15	K3 League	4th	30	13	8	7	36	29	+7	47	First round	
2024	16	K3 League	12th	30	9	7	4	30	43	-13	34	Second round	

== See also ==
- List of football clubs in South Korea
