= 2011 Sangju Sangmu Phoenix season =

Sangju Sangmu Phoenix
2011 season
- Manager: Lee Soo-Chul (until July 11, 2011); Kim Tae-Wan (since July 12, 2011)
- K-League: 14th
- Korean FA Cup: Round of 16
- League Cup: Group Round
- Top goalscorer: League: Kim Jung-Woo (15); All: Kim Jung-Woo (19)
- Highest home attendance: 16,400 vs Incheon (March 5)
- Lowest home attendance: 4,765 vs Jeonbuk (June 25)
- Average home league attendance: 8,295
Home colours	Away colours

The 2011 season was Sangju Sangmu Phoenix's tenth season in the K-League in South Korea. Sangju Sangmu Phoenix was competing in K-League, League Cup and Korean FA Cup.

== Current squad ==
Note: Flags indicate national team as defined under FIFA eligibility rules; some limited exceptions apply. Players may hold more than one non-FIFA nationality.

No.	Pos.	Nation	Player
2	DF	KOR	Choi Hyo-Jin
7	MF	KOR	Kim Chi-Woo
8	DF	KOR	Lee Jong-min
12	FW	KOR	Yoo Chang-Hyun
14	MF	KOR	Kim Cheol-Ho
19	MF	KOR	Ko Cha-Won
21	GK	KOR	Kwon Sun-Tae
22	DF	KOR	Kim Chi-Gon (captain)
24	FW	KOR	Kim Min-Soo
26	FW	KOR	Oh Won-Jong

No.	Pos.	Nation	Player
33	MF	KOR	Kim Yong-Tae
35	FW	KOR	Lee Sung-Jae
36	DF	KOR	Lee Jong-Chan
37	MF	KOR	Oh Bong-Jin
38	DF	KOR	Kang Min-Woo
39	DF	KOR	Lee Yoon-Eui
40	MF	KOR	Kim Beom-Jun
42	MF	KOR	Hwang Byung-In
43	GK	KOR	Lee Sang-Ki

== Match results ==
=== K-League ===
Date Round	Home	Score	Away	Location

5 March 1	Sangju Sangmu Phoenix	2–0	Incheon United	Sangju, Gyeongbuk
15:00 UTC+9	Kim Jung-Woo 5' (pen.), 50'	Report		Stadium: Sangju Stadium; Attendance: 16,400; Referee: Ahn Yong-Hee

13 March 2	Busan I'Park	3–3	Sangju Sangmu Phoenix	Yeonje-gu, Busan
15:00 UTC+9	Han Sang-Woon 5'; Fyfe 82'; Lee Won-Gyu 90+4'	Report	Cho Yong-Tae 28'; Choi Hyo-Jin 37'; Kim Jung-Woo 86'	Stadium: Busan Asiad Stadium; Attendance: 29,267; Referee: Hong Jin-Ho

20 March 3	Seongnam Ilhwa Chunma	2–3	Sangju Sangmu Phoenix	Seongnam, Gyeonggi
15:00 UTC+9	Song Ho-Young 4'; Ognenovski 88' (pen.)	Report	Jang Nam-Seok 65', 66'; Kim Jung-Woo 68'	Stadium: Tancheon Sports Complex; Attendance: 2,893; Referee: Kim Dong-Jin

2 April 4	Jeju United	3–3	Sangju Sangmu Phoenix	Seogwipo, Jeju
15:00 UTC+9	Kim In-Ho 24'; Santos 32'; Kang Su-Il 90+1'	Report	Kim Jung-Woo 2', 39' (pen.); Ko Cha-Won 84'	Stadium: Jeju World Cup Stadium; Attendance: 2,054; Referee: Ryu Hee-Seon

9 April 5	Gwangju	0–0	Sangju Sangmu Phoenix	Seo-gu, Gwangju
15:00 UTC+9		Report		Stadium: Gwangju World Cup Stadium; Attendance: 7,253; Referee: Lee Sam-Ho

16 April 6	Sangju Sangmu Phoenix	0–0	Daejeon Citizen	Sangju, Gyeongbuk
15:00 UTC+9		Report		Stadium: Sangju Stadium; Attendance: 7,624; Referee: Choi Kwang-Bo

23 April 7	Chunnam Dragons	0–1	Sangju Sangmu Phoenix	Gwangyang, Jeonnam
17:00 UTC+9		Report	Kim Jung-Woo 3'	Stadium: Gwangyang Stadium; Attendance: 7,809; Referee: Ko Keum-Bok

30 April 8	Sangju Sangmu Phoenix	1–0	Suwon Samsung Bluewings	Sangju, Gyeongbuk
15:00 UTC+9	Ko Cha-Won 70'	Report		Stadium: Sangju Stadium; Attendance: 5,948; Referee: Lee Sam-Ho

8 May 9	Sangju Sangmu Phoenix	3–4	FC Seoul	Sangju, Gyeongbuk
19:30 UTC+9	Park Yong-Ho 18' (o.g.); Choi Hyo-Jin 46'; Kim Young-Sam (yellow card) 56' (yellow-red card) 82'; Kim Jung-Woo 74'; Yoon Yeo-San (yellow card) 85' (red card) 90+3'	Report	Dejan 9', 35', 73'; Hyun Young-Min 87'	Stadium: Sangju Stadium; Attendance: 9,170; Referee: Lee Sang-Yong

14 May 10	Daegu	Postponed	Sangju Sangmu Phoenix	Buk-gu, Daegu
19:00 UTC+9				Stadium: Daegu Civil Stadium

21 May 11	Gyeongnam	0–1	Sangju Sangmu Phoenix	Changwon, Gyeongnam
19:00 UTC+9		Report	Yoo Chang-Hyun (yellow card) 77' (yellow-red card) 85'; Kim In-Han 81' (o.g.)	Stadium: Changwon Football Center; Attendance: 8,247; Referee: Choi Kwang-Bo

28 May 12	Sangju Sangmu Phoenix	0–0	Gangwon	Sangju, Gyeongbuk
19:00 UTC+9		Report		Stadium: Sangju Stadium; Attendance: 11,324; Referee: Ko Keum-Bok

5 June Re-10	Daegu	0–0	Sangju Sangmu Phoenix	Buk-gu, Daegu
19:00 UTC+9		Report		Stadium: Daegu Civil Stadium; Attendance: 3,053; Referee: Lee Min-Hu

11 June 13	Sangju Sangmu Phoenix	1–2	Ulsan Hyundai	Sangju, Gyeongbuk
19:00 UTC+9	Kim Jung-Woo 11'	Report	Go Seul-Ki 13'; Lee Jae-Seong 87'	Stadium: Sangju Stadium; Attendance: 10,573; Referee: Ryu Hee-Seon

18 June 14	Pohang Steelers	4–3	Sangju Sangmu Phoenix	Pohang, Gyeongbuk
19:00 UTC+9	Ko Mu-Yeol 48'; Kim Tae-Su 72'; Mota 76' (pen.); Asamoah 87'	Report	Kim Jung-Woo 13' (pen.); Jang Nam-Seok 37'; Ko Cha-Won 45+4'	Stadium: Steelyard Stadium; Attendance: 12,254; Referee: Lee Jong-Guk

25 June 15	Sangju Sangmu Phoenix	0–3	Jeonbuk Hyundai Motors	Sangju, Gyeongbuk
19:00 UTC+9		Report	Cho Sung-Hwan 18'; Luiz 32'; Lee Seung-Hyun 86'	Stadium: Sangju Stadium; Attendance: 4,765; Referee: Lee Sam-Ho

2 July 16	Sangju Sangmu Phoenix	1–2	Daegu	Sangju, Gyeongbuk
19:00 UTC+9	Kim Jung-Woo 9'; Kwon Sun-Tae (yellow card) 21' (yellow-red card) 68'	Report	Kim Min-Koo 29'; Kim Hyun-Sung 32'; Quirino (yellow card) 75' (yellow-red card) 90'	Stadium: Sangju Stadium; Attendance: 11,635; Referee: Ko Keum-Bok

9 July 17	FC Seoul	3–2	Sangju Sangmu Phoenix	Mapo-gu, Seoul
20:00 UTC+9	Damjanović 54', 65'; Bang Seung-Hwan 90+3'	Report	Kim Jung-Woo 33' (pen.); Kim Min-Soo 84'	Stadium: Seoul World Cup Stadium; Attendance: 28,034; Referee: Kim Dong-Jin

16 July 18	Sangju Sangmu Phoenix	1–2	Busan I'Park	Sangju, Gyeongbuk
19:00 UTC+9	Kim Cheol-Ho 34'	Report	Han Ji-Ho 38'; Park Tae-Min 74'	Stadium: Sangju Stadium; Attendance: 8,352; Referee: Kim Sung-Ho

23 July 19	Sangju Sangmu Phoenix	1–1	Jeju United	Sangju, Gyeongbuk
19:00 UTC+9	Kim Jung-Woo 59'	Report	Kim Eun-Jung 88'	Stadium: Sangju Stadium; Attendance: 8,451; Referee: Lee Dong-Jun

6 August 20	Sangju Sangmu Phoenix	1–3	Seongnam Ilhwa Chunma	Sangju, Gyeongbuk
19:30 UTC+9	Kim Jung-Woo 74'	Report	Namgung Do 28'; Radončić 63'; Éverton Santos 86'	Stadium: Sangju Stadium; Attendance: 8,867; Referee: Choi Myung-Yong

13 August 21	Sangju Sangmu Phoenix	2–0	Gwangju	Sangju, Gyeongbuk
19:30 UTC+9	Yoo Chang-Hyun 14'; Kim Jung-Woo 90+2'	Report		Stadium: Sangju Stadium; Attendance: 6,735; Referee: Ko Hyung-Jin

20 August 22	Suwon Samsung Bluewings	3–0	Sangju Sangmu Phoenix	Suwon, Gyeonggi
18:00 UTC+9	Yeom Ki-Hun 19' (pen.); Ristić 30'; Lee Sang-ho 90' (pen.)	Report		Stadium: Suwon World Cup Stadium; Attendance: 26,989; Referee: Lee Min-Hu

27 August 23	Sangju Sangmu Phoenix	0–1	Chunnam Dragons	Sangju, Gyeongbuk
19:30 UTC+9		Report	Lee Hyun-Seung 62'	Stadium: Sangju Stadium; Attendance: 9,153; Referee: Yoo Seon-Ho

10 September 24	Gangwon	2–0	Sangju Sangmu Phoenix	Gangneung, Gangwon
19:00 UTC+9	Seo Dong-Hyun 1'; Jung Sung-Min 81'	Report		Stadium: Gangneung Stadium; Attendance: 3,360; Referee: Lee Sang-Yong

17 September 25	Ulsan Hyundai	3–1	Sangju Sangmu Phoenix	Nam-gu, Ulsan
17:00 UTC+9	Lee Jin-Ho 29'; Kwak Tae-Hwi 70'; Park Seung-Il 78'	Report	Lee Sung-Jae 56'	Stadium: Munsu Cup Stadium; Attendance: 6,573; Referee: Hong Jin-Ho

25 September 26	Sangju Sangmu Phoenix	1–3	Pohang Steelers	Sangju, Gyeongbuk
15:00 UTC+9	Kim Yong-Tae 73'	Report	Adriano Chuva 22'; Mota 43'; Shin Hyung-Min 87'	Stadium: Sangju Stadium; Attendance: 4,352; Referee: Ahn Yong-Hee

3 October 27	Jeonbuk Hyundai Motors	5–1	Sangju Sangmu Phoenix	Jeonju, Jeonbuk
15:00 UTC+9	Lee Dong-Gook 27', 87'; Lee Seung-Hyun 45+1', 59'; Eninho 65'	Report	Kim Chi-Gon (red card) 41'; Lee Sung-Jae 53'	Stadium: Jeonju World Cup Stadium; Attendance: 11,609; Referee: Hong Jin-Ho

16 October 28	Daejeon Citizen	1–3	Sangju Sangmu Phoenix	Yuseong-gu, Daejeon
15:00 UTC+9	Park Sung-Ho 6'	Report	Ko Cha-Won 27'; Kim Chi-Woo 32'; Kim Min-Soo 36'	Stadium: Daejeon World Cup Stadium; Attendance: 8,591; Referee: Lee Sang-Yong

22 October 29	Sangju Sangmu Phoenix	1–3	Gyeongnam	Sangju, Gyeongbuk
15:00 UTC+9	Yoo Chang-Hyun 84'	Report	Yoon Bit-Garam 30'; Seo Sang-Min 47'; Kim Joo-Young 68'	Stadium: Sangju Stadium; Attendance: 3,245; Referee: Ko Keum-Bok

30 October 30	Incheon United	0–0	Sangju Sangmu Phoenix	Seo-gu, Incheon
15:00 UTC+9		Report		Stadium: Incheon Munhak Stadium; Attendance: 4,331; Referee: Woo Sang-Il

==== League table ====
Pos	Team	Pld	W	D	L	GF	GA	GD	Pts
12	Daegu FC	30	8	9	13	35	46	−11	33
13	Incheon United	30	6	14	10	31	40	−9	32
14	Sangju Sangmu Phoenix	30	7	8	15	36	53	−17	29
15	Daejeon Citizen	30	6	9	15	31	59	−28	27
16	Gangwon FC	30	3	6	21	14	45	−31	15

Source: K League
Rules for classification: 1) Points; 2) Goal difference; 3) Goals scored

Pos	Team	Qualification
1	Jeonbuk Hyundai Motors (C)	Qualification for the Champions League group stage
2	Ulsan Hyundai	Qualification for the Champions League group stage
3	Pohang Steelers	Qualification for the Champions League playoff round
4	Suwon Samsung Bluewings	
5	FC Seoul	
6	Busan IPark	

Source: RSSSF
(C) Champions

==== Results summary ====
Overall								Home						Away					
Pld	W	D	L	GF	GA	GD	Pts	W	D	L	GF	GA	GD	W	D	L	GF	GA	GD
30	7	8	15	36	53	−17	29	3	3	9	15	24	−9	4	5	6	21	29	−8

==== Results by round ====
Round	1	2	3	4	5	6	7	8	9	10	11	12	13	14	15	16	17	18	19	20	21	22	23	24	25	26	27	28	29	30
Ground	H	A	A	A	A	H	A	H	H	A	H	A	H	A	H	H	A	H	H	H	H	A	H	A	A	H	A	A	H	A
Result	W	D	W	D	D	D	W	W	L	W	D	D	L	L	L	L	L	L	D	L	W	L	L	L	L	L	L	W	L	D
Position	1	3	1	5	5	6	3	3	3	4	3	3	4	4	6	9	13	13	13	13	11	11	12	13	14	14	14	14	14	14

Updated to match(es) played on 30 October 2011. Source: League Fixtures and Results
A = Away; H = Home; W = Win; D = Draw; L = Loss

=== Korean FA Cup ===
18 May Round of 32	Gangneung City	1–2 (a.e.t.)	Sangju Sangmu Phoenix	Gangneung, Gangwon
19:00 UTC+9	Lee Jung-Woon 13'		Kim Cheol-Ho 66', 117'	Stadium: Gangneung Stadium; Attendance: 2,000

15 June Round of 16	Ulsan Hyundai	2–1 (a.e.t.)	Sangju Sangmu Phoenix	Nam-gu, Ulsan
19:00 UTC+9	Lee Ho 31'; Go Seul-Ki 113'		Kim Jung-Woo 24'	Stadium: Munsu Cup Stadium; Attendance: 1,385

=== League Cup ===
16 March Group round	Chunnam Dragons	1–0	Sangju Sangmu Phoenix	Gwangyang, Jeonnam
19:00 UTC+9	Lee Hyun-Seung 20'	Report		Stadium: Gwangyang Stadium; Attendance: 1,143; Referee: Kim Sung-Ho

6 April Group round	Ulsan Hyundai	2–1	Sangju Sangmu Phoenix	Nam-gu, Ulsan
19:00 UTC+9	Lee Jin-Ho 11', 53'	Report	Kim Jung-Woo 82'	Stadium: Munsu Cup Stadium; Attendance: 3,323; Referee: Kim Dong-Jin

20 April Group round	Busan I'Park	2–1	Sangju Sangmu Phoenix	Yeonje-gu, Busan
19:00 UTC+9	Han Ji-Ho 30'; Kim Han-Yoon 54'	Report	Jung Kyung-ho (yellow card) 49' (yellow-red card) 83'; Kim Chi-Woo 90+2'	Stadium: Busan Asiad Stadium; Attendance: 1,038; Referee: Woo Sang-Il

5 May Group round	Sangju Sangmu Phoenix	2–3	Gwangju	Sangju, Gyeongbuk
15:00 UTC+9	Kim Dong-hyun 23'; Kim Jung-Woo 61'	Report	Kim Sung-Min 12'; Yoo Dong-Min 58'; Kim Sung-Min 90+1'	Stadium: Sangju Stadium; Attendance: 8,972; Referee: Choi Kwang-Bo

11 May Group round	Sangju Sangmu Phoenix	2–1	Gangwon	Sangju, Gyeongbuk
15:00 UTC+9	Kim Dong-hyun 51'; Kim Jung-Woo 88'	Report	Ha Jung-Heon 5'	Stadium: Sangju Stadium; Attendance: 5,445; Referee: Ko Hyung-Jin

== Squad statistics ==
=== Appearances and goals ===
Statistics accurate as of match played 30 October 2011
Numbers in parentheses denote appearances as substitute.

No.	Nat.	Pos.	Name	League		FA Cup		League Cup		Total	
No.	Nat.	Pos.	Name	Apps	Goals	Apps	Goals	Apps	Goals	Apps	Goals
2	KOR	DF	Choi Hyo-Jin	25	2	2	0	2 (3)	0	29 (3)	2
7	KOR	MF	Kim Chi-Woo	26	1	1	0	1 (1)	1	28 (1)	2
8	KOR	DF	Lee Jong-min	15 (6)	0	0	0	2	0	17 (6)	0
12	KOR	FW	Yoo Chang-Hyun	12 (5)	2	1	0	2 (1)	0	15 (6)	2
14	KOR	MF	Kim Cheol-Ho	27	1	2	2	2	0	31 (0)	3
19	KOR	MF	Ko Cha-Won	18 (10)	4	0 (2)	0	4 (1)	0	22 (13)	4
21	KOR	GK	Kwon Sun-Tae	15	0	1	0	2	0	18 (0)	0
22	KOR	DF	Kim Chi-Gon	18	0	0	0	1	0	19 (0)	0
24	KOR	FW	Kim Min-Soo	7 (8)	2	0 (1)	0	1	0	8 (9)	2
26	KOR	FW	Oh Won-Jong	0 (3)	0	0	0	2	0	2 (3)	0
33	KOR	MF	Kim Yong-Tae	15 (2)	1	0	0	1	0	16 (2)	1
35	KOR	FW	Lee Sung-Jae	6 (3)	2	0 (1)	0	2	0	8 (4)	2
36	KOR	DF	Lee Jong-Chan	5	0	0	0	0	0	5 (0)	0
37	KOR	MF	Oh Bong-Jin	0 (1)	0	0	0	1	0	1 (1)	0
38	KOR	DF	Kang Min-Woo	0 (2)	0	0	0	0	0	0 (2)	0
39	KOR	DF	Lee Yoon-Eui	1 (2)	0	0	0	0 (1)	0	1 (3)	0
40	KOR	MF	Kim Beom-Jun	4 (6)	0	0 (1)	0	0	0	4 (7)	0
42	KOR	MF	Hwang Byung-In	3	0	0	0	0	0	3 (0)	0
43	KOR	GK	Lee Sang-Ki	3 (1)	0	0	0	0	0	3 (1)	0
1	KOR	GK	Kim Jee-Hyuk (out)	11	0	1	0	0	0	12 (0)	0
3	KOR	DF	Oh Chang-Sik (out)	1	0	0	0	1 (1)	0	2 (1)	0
4	KOR	MF	Kim Young-Sam (out)	13	0	2	0	2 (1)	0	17 (1)	0
5	KOR	DF	Yoon Yeo-San (out)	11	0	2	0	1	0	14 (0)	0
6	KOR	MF	Kim Min-O (out)	9	0	0	0	1	0	10 (0)	0
9	KOR	FW	Jang Nam-Seok (out)	15	3	2	0	1	0	18 (0)	3
10	KOR	MF	Kim Jung-Woo (out)	20 (1)	15	2	1	2 (3)	3	24 (4)	19
11	KOR	FW	Cho Yong-Tae (out)	7 (1)	1	0 (1)	0	1 (3)	0	8 (5)	1
13	KOR	MF	Jung Kyung-ho (out)	9	0	1	0	2	0	12 (0)	0
15	KOR	DF	Kim Sun-Woo (out)	5 (2)	0	0	0	0	0	5 (2)	0
16	KOR	FW	Ju Kwang-Youn (out)	2 (1)	0	0	0	1	0	3 (1)	0
17	KOR	MF	Byun Woong (out)	1 (4)	0	0 (1)	0	4	0	5 (5)	0
18	KOR	FW	Kim Dong-hyun (out)	1 (5)	0	1	0	4	2	6 (5)	2
20	KOR	DF	Hwang Ji-Yoon (out)	0 (1)	0	0 (1)	0	0	0	0 (2)	0
23	KOR	FW	Lee Jun-Young (out)	0	0	0	0	0	0	0	0
25	KOR	MF	Kim Ji-min (out)	4 (2)	0	1	0	2	0	7 (2)	0
27	KOR	DF	Park Jung-Sik (out)	0	0	0	0	0	0	0	0
28	KOR	DF	Cho Jae-Yong (out)	0	0	1	0	1	0	2 (0)	0
29	KOR	DF	Kim Ju-Hwan (out)	7	0	1	0	2	0	10 (0)	0
30	KOR	DF	Yoon Sin-Young (out)	7 (6)	0	1	0	4	0	12 (6)	0
31	KOR	GK	Park Sang-Cheol (out)	0	0	0	0	2	0	2 (0)	0
32	KOR	FW	Lee Je-Kyu (out)	4 (4)	0	0	0	0	0	4 (4)	0
34	KOR	FW	Kwak Chul-Ho (out)	2 (5)	0	0	0	0	0	2 (5)	0
41	KOR	GK	Lim In-Sung (out)	0	0	0	0	1	0	1 (0)	0

=== Top scorers ===
Rank	Nation	Number	Name	K-League	KFA Cup	League Cup	Total
1	(South Korea)	10	Kim Jung-Woo	15	1	3	19
2	(South Korea)	19	Ko Cha-Won	4	0	0	4
3	(South Korea)	9	Jang Nam-Seok	3	0	0	3
=	(South Korea)	14	Kim Cheol-Ho	1	2	0	3
4	(South Korea)	2	Choi Hyo-Jin	2	0	0	2
=	(South Korea)	12	Yoo Chang-Hyun	2	0	0	2
=	(South Korea)	24	Kim Min-Soo	2	0	0	2
=	(South Korea)	35	Lee Sung-Jae	2	0	0	2
=	(South Korea)	7	Kim Chi-Woo	1	0	1	2
=	(South Korea)	18	Kim Dong-hyun	0	0	2	2
5	(South Korea)	11	Cho Yong-Tae	1	0	0	1
=	(South Korea)	33	Kim Yong-Tae	1	0	0	1
/	/	/	Own Goals	2	0	0	2
/	/	/	TOTALS	36	3	6	45

=== Top assistors ===
Rank	Nation	Number	Name	K-League	KFA Cup	League Cup	Total
1	(South Korea)	14	Kim Cheol-Ho	4	0	0	4
=	(South Korea)	9	Jang Nam-Seok	3	0	1	4
2	(South Korea)	24	Kim Min-Soo	3	0	0	3
3	(South Korea)	12	Yoo Chang-Hyun	2	0	0	2
=	(South Korea)	2	Choi Hyo-Jin	1	0	1	2
=	(South Korea)	13	Jung Kyung-ho	1	0	1	2
=	(South Korea)	18	Kim Dong-hyun	0	0	2	2
4	(South Korea)	8	Lee Jong-min	1	0	0	1
=	(South Korea)	10	Kim Jung-Woo	1	0	0	1
=	(South Korea)	16	Ju Kwang-Youn	1	0	0	1
=	(South Korea)	19	Ko Cha-Won	1	0	0	1
=	(South Korea)	34	Kwak Chul-Ho	1	0	0	1
=	(South Korea)	11	Cho Yong-Tae	0	1	0	1
/	/	/	TOTALS	19	1	5	25

=== Discipline ===
Position	Nation	Number	Name	K-League		KFA Cup		League Cup		Total	
Position	Nation	Number	Name	Booked	Sent off (straight red)	Booked	Sent off (straight red)	Booked	Sent off (straight red)	Booked	Sent off (straight red)
GK	(South Korea)	1	Kim Jee-Hyuk	2	0	0	0	0	0	2	0
DF	(South Korea)	2	Choi Hyo-Jin	3	0	0	0	0	0	3	0
DF	(South Korea)	3	Oh Chang-Sik	0	0	0	0	1	0	1	0
DF	(South Korea)	4	Kim Young-Sam	3	1	0	0	0	0	3	1
DF	(South Korea)	5	Yoon Yeo-San	6	1	2	0	0	0	8	1
MF	(South Korea)	6	Kim Min-O	2	0	0	0	0	0	2	0
MF	(South Korea)	7	Kim Chi-Woo	5	0	0	0	0	0	5	0
DF	(South Korea)	8	Lee Jong-min	2	0	0	0	0	0	2	0
FW	(South Korea)	9	Jang Nam-Seok	0	0	1	0	1	0	2	0
MF	(South Korea)	10	Kim Jung-Woo	4	0	1	0	0	0	5	0
MF	(South Korea)	12	Yoo Chang-Hyun	4	1	0	0	0	0	4	1
MF	(South Korea)	13	Jung Kyung-ho	0	0	0	0	3	1	3	1
MF	(South Korea)	14	Kim Cheol-Ho	4	0	1	0	0	0	5	0
DF	(South Korea)	15	Kim Sun-Woo	2	0	0	0	0	0	2	0
FW	(South Korea)	18	Kim Dong-hyun	1	0	0	0	0	0	1	0
FW	(South Korea)	19	Ko Cha-Won	2	0	1	0	0	0	3	0
GK	(South Korea)	21	Kwon Sun-Tae	3	1	0	0	0	0	3	1
DF	(South Korea)	22	Kim Chi-Gon	3	1	0	0	0	0	3	1
FW	(South Korea)	24	Kim Min-Soo	2	0	0	0	1	0	3	0
MF	(South Korea)	25	Kim Ji-min	2	0	0	0	0	0	2	0
MF	(South Korea)	26	Oh Won-Jong	0	0	0	0	1	0	1	0
DF	(South Korea)	28	Cho Jae-Yong	0	0	1	0	0	0	1	0
MF	(South Korea)	29	Kim Ju-Hwan	2	0	1	0	1	0	4	0
DF	(South Korea)	30	Yoon Sin-Young	2	0	0	0	2	0	4	0
GK	(South Korea)	31	Park Sang-Cheol	0	0	0	0	1	0	1	0
FW	(South Korea)	32	Lee Je-Kyu	2	0	0	0	0	0	2	0
MF	(South Korea)	33	Kim Yong-Tae	2	0	0	0	0	0	2	0
MF	(South Korea)	34	Kwak Chul-Ho	1	0	0	0	0	0	1	0
FW	(South Korea)	35	Lee Sung-Jae	2	0	0	0	1	0	3	0
/	/	/	TOTALS	61	5	8	0	12	1	81	6

== Transfer ==
=== In ===
Date	Pos.	Name	From	Source
29 November 2010	GK	(South Korea) Park Sang-Cheol	(South Korea) Chunnam Dragons	
29 November 2010	MF	(South Korea) Ko Cha-Won	(South Korea) Chunnam Dragons	
29 November 2010	DF	(South Korea) Hwang Byung-In	(South Korea) Gyeongnam FC	
29 November 2010	DF	(South Korea) Lee Yoon-Eui	(South Korea) Gangwon FC	
29 November 2010	DF	(South Korea) Kang Min-Woo	(South Korea) Gangwon FC	
29 November 2010	FW	(South Korea) Oh Won-Jong	(South Korea) Gangwon FC	
29 November 2010	DF	(South Korea) Hwang Ji-Yoon	(South Korea) Daejeon Citizen	
29 November 2010	DF	(South Korea) Lee Jong-Chan	(South Korea) Daejeon Citizen	
29 November 2010	FW	(South Korea) Lee Sung-Jae	(South Korea) Pohang Steelers	
29 November 2010	MF	(South Korea) Kim Beom-Jun	(South Korea) Pohang Steelers	
29 November 2010	FW	(South Korea) Yoo Chang-Hyun	(South Korea) Pohang Steelers	
29 November 2010	MF	(South Korea) Oh Bong-Jin	(South Korea) Jeju United FC	
29 November 2010	MF	(South Korea) Kim Yong-Tae	(South Korea) Ulsan Hyundai FC	
29 November 2010	FW	(South Korea) Kim Min-Soo	(South Korea) Incheon United FC	
29 November 2010	FW	(South Korea) Lee Jun-Young	(South Korea) Incheon United FC	
29 November 2010	FW	(South Korea) Jang Nam-Seok	(South Korea) Daegu FC	
6 December 2010	DF	(South Korea) Kim Chi-Gon	(South Korea) Ulsan Hyundai FC	
6 December 2010	GK	(South Korea) Kwon Sun-Tae	(South Korea) Jeonbuk Hyundai Motors	
6 December 2010	MF	(South Korea) Kim Cheol-Ho	(South Korea) Seongnam Ilhwa Chunma	
6 December 2010	DF	(South Korea) Lee Jong-min	(South Korea) FC Seoul	
6 December 2010	DF	(South Korea) Choi Hyo-Jin	(South Korea) FC Seoul	
6 December 2010	MF	(South Korea) Kim Chi-Woo	(South Korea) FC Seoul	

- 26 July 2011 – (South Korea) Lee Sang-Ki – Suwon Samsung Bluewings

=== Out ===
- 17 June 2011 – (South Korea) Kim Dong-hyun – Released (termination of contract)
- 7 July 2011 – (South Korea) Kim Jee-Hyuk – Released (under arrest)
- 7 July 2011 – (South Korea) Park Sang-Cheol – Released (under arrest)
- 7 July 2011 – (South Korea) Ju Kwang-Youn – Released (under arrest)
- 7 July 2011 – (South Korea) Yoon Yeo-San – Released (under indictment)
- 7 July 2011 – (South Korea) Jang Nam-Seok – Released (under indictment)
- 7 July 2011 – (South Korea) Hwang Ji-Yoon – Released (under indictment)
- 7 July 2011 – (South Korea) Lee Jun-Young – Released (under indictment)
- 7 July 2011 – (South Korea) Lim In-Sung – Released (under indictment)
- 21 September 2011 – (South Korea) Kim Jung-Woo – Seongnam Ilhwa Chunma (discharge from the army)
- 21 September 2011 – (South Korea) Cho Jae-Yong – Gyeongnam FC (discharge from the army)
- 21 September 2011 – (South Korea) Jung Kyung-ho – Chunnam Dragons (discharge from the army)
- 21 September 2011 – (South Korea) Cho Yong-Tae – Suwon Samsung Bluewings (discharge from the army)
- 21 September 2011 – (South Korea) Kim Sun-Woo – Incheon United (discharge from the army)
- 21 September 2011 – (South Korea) Park Jung-Sik – Daegu FC (discharge from the army)
- 21 September 2011 – (South Korea) Kim Ju-Hwan – Daegu FC (discharge from the army)
- 21 September 2011 – (South Korea) Kim Ji-min – Daejeon Citizen (discharge from the army)
- 21 September 2011 – (South Korea) Yoon Sin-Young – Daejeon Citizen (discharge from the army)
- 21 September 2011 – (South Korea) Lee Je-Kyu – Daejeon Citizen (discharge from the army)
- 21 September 2011 – (South Korea) Kwak Chul-Ho – Daejeon Citizen (discharge from the army)
- 21 September 2011 – (South Korea) Oh Chang-Sik – Ulsan Hyundai (discharge from the army)
- 21 September 2011 – (South Korea) Kim Young-Sam – Ulsan Hyundai (discharge from the army)
- 21 September 2011 – (South Korea) Kim Min-O – Ulsan Hyundai (discharge from the army)
- 21 September 2011 – (South Korea) Byun Woong – Ulsan Hyundai (discharge from the army)
