= 2010 Gwangju Sangmu FC season =

Gwangju Sangmu FC
2010 season
- Chairman: Park Gwang-Tae (mayor)
- Manager: Lee Kang-Jo
- K-League: 14th
- Korean FA Cup: Quarterfinal
- League Cup: Group Round
- Top goalscorer: League: Choi Sung-Kuk (4); All: Choi Sung-Kuk (5)
- Highest home attendance: 21,360 vs Pohang (14 March)
- Lowest home attendance: 200 vs Pohang (21 July)
- Average home league attendance: 3,300
Home colours	Away colours

The 2010 season was Gwangju Sangmu FC's ninth season in the K-League in South Korea. Gwangju Sangmu FC will be competing in the K-League, League Cup and Korean FA Cup.

== Current squad ==
Note: Flags indicate national team as defined under FIFA eligibility rules; some limited exceptions apply. Players may hold more than one non-FIFA nationality.

No.	Pos.	Nation	Player
1	GK	KOR	Seong Kyung-Il
2	DF	KOR	Oh Chang-Sik
3	DF	KOR	Park Byung-Gyu
4	MF	KOR	Kim Young-Sam
5	DF	KOR	Bae Hyo-Sung
6	DF	KOR	Hwang Sun-Pil
7	DF	KOR	Park Won-Hong
8	MF	KOR	Park Seung-Min
9	MF	KOR	Park Sang-Uk
10	FW	KOR	Choi Sung-Kuk
11	MF	KOR	Jeon Kwang-Hwan
12	MF	KOR	Kim Bum-Soo
13	DF	KOR	Choi Won-Kwon
14	MF	KOR	Kim Jung-Woo
15	DF	KOR	Jeong Ho-Jin
16	MF	KOR	Seo Min-Gook
17	DF	KOR	Kim Soo-Yeon
18	MF	KOR	Kang Gu-Nam
19	MF	KOR	Park Jin-Ok
20	MF	KOR	Kim Tae-Min
21	GK	KOR	Lim In-Sung

No.	Pos.	Nation	Player
22	DF	KOR	Jang Hyun-Kyu
23	MF	KOR	Kim Young-Jun
24	DF	KOR	Park Jung-Sik
25	FW	KOR	Cho Yong-Tae
26	MF	KOR	Jung Kyung-Ho
27	FW	KOR	Ju Kwang-Youn
28	FW	KOR	Kim Dong-Hyun
29	MF	KOR	Chun Je-Hun
30	DF	KOR	Yoon Yeo-San
31	GK	KOR	Kim Jee-Hyuk
32	FW	KOR	Lee Je-Kyu
33	MF	KOR	Kim Min-O
34	MF	KOR	Kwon Hyuk-Jin
35	DF	KOR	Cho Jae-Yong
36	DF	KOR	Yoon Sin-Young
37	MF	KOR	Kim Ji-Min
38	MF	KOR	Byun Woong
39	DF	KOR	Kim Ju-Hwan
40	DF	KOR	Kim Sun-Woo
42	FW	KOR	Byun Yoon-Cheol

== K-League ==
Date	Opponents	H / A	Result F – A	Scorers	Attendance	League position
27 February	Daegu FC	A	2–1	Choi Sung-Kuk 32', 66'	3,532	4th
7 March	Incheon United	A	0–2		10,072	10th
14 March	Pohang Steelers	H	1–1	Choi Won-Kwon 90+4'	21,360	10th
21 March	Busan I'Park	A	0–2		3,405	12th
28 March	Jeju United	H	0–0		2,532	12th
3 April	Daejeon Citizen	H	1–1	Choi Won-Kwon 69'(pen)	1,532	11th
10 April	Chunnam Dragons	A	3–2	Choi Sung-Kuk 14', Kim Jung-Woo 45+1', Cho Yong-Tae 84'	8,980	8th
18 April	Jeonbuk Hyundai Motors	H	0–1		1,907	9th
24 April	Seongnam Ilhwa Chunma	H	0–2		3,572	9th
1 May	Ulsan Hyundai FC	A	2–2	Kim Jung-Woo 28', Kim Dong-hyun 33'	9,372	9th
9 May	Gangwon FC	H	1–0	Kim Dong-hyun 53'	2,367	9th
17 July	Gyeongnam FC	A	0–1		10,458	9th
24 July	FC Seoul	H	0–2		6,215	10th
31 July	Suwon Samsung Bluewings	A	0–2		22,326	11th
8 August	Jeju United	A	0–4		4,155	12th
14 August	Busan I'Park	H	1–1	Kim Dong-hyun 57'	5,611	12th
28 August	Gyeongnam FC	H	1–1	Kim Jung-Woo 22'	1,255	13th
4 September	FC Seoul	A	0–3		21,329	13th
12 September	Incheon United	H	1–1	Park Won-Hong 90'	1,318	13th
19 September	Daejeon Citizen	A	0–3		4,788	14th
26 September	Suwon Samsung Bluewings	H	1–1	Choi Sung-Kuk 80'(pen)	1,756	14th
2 October	Jeonbuk Hyundai Motors	A	0–0		4,142	14th
9 October	Pohang Steelers	A	0–1		8,115	14th
16 October	Daegu FC	H	0–3		1,118	15th
27 October	Gangwon FC	A	0–1		4,721	15th
30 October	Seongnam Ilhwa Chunma	A	2–2	Kim Soo-Yeon 15', Choi Won-Kwon 60'	2,039	15th
3 November	Chunnam Dragons	H	0–1		1,019	14th
7 November	Ulsan Hyundai FC	H	1–2	Cho Yong-Tae 10'	1,379	14th

Pos	Team	Pld	W	D	L	GF	GA	GD	Pts
11	Incheon United	28	8	7	13	42	51	−9	31
12	Gangwon FC	28	8	6	14	36	50	−14	30
13	Daejeon Citizen	28	5	7	16	27	50	−23	22
14	Gwangju Sangmu	28	3	10	15	17	43	−26	19
15	Daegu FC	28	5	4	19	28	57	−29	19

Source: K League (in Korean)
Rules for classification: 1) Points; 2) Goal difference; 3) Goals scored

Pos	Team	Qualification
1	FC Seoul (C)	Qualification for the Champions League
2	Jeju United	Qualification for the Champions League
3	Jeonbuk Hyundai Motors	Qualification for the Champions League
4	Seongnam Ilhwa Chunma	
5	Ulsan Hyundai	
6	Gyeongnam FC	

Source: RSSSF
(C) Champions

== Korean FA Cup ==
Date	Round	Opponents	H / A	Result F – A	Scorers	Attendance
21 April	Round of 32	Ulsan Mipo Dockyard	H	3–0	Kim Dong-hyun 24', Jeon Kwang-Hwan 40', Cho Yong-Tae 55'	500
21 July	Round of 16	Pohang Steelers	H	2–1	Choi Won-Kwon 45+2', Park Won-Hong 108'	200
18 August	Quarterfinal	Chunnam Dragons	A	1–2	Choi Sung-Kuk 26'	6,534

== League Cup ==
=== Group stage ===
Date	Opponents	H / A	Result F – A	Scorers	Attendance	Group position
23 May	FC Seoul	H	0–0		4,219	3rd
26 May	Jeju United	A	0–2		578	5th
2 June	Seongnam Ilhwa Chunma	H	1–1	Cho Yong-Tae 10'	1,538	5th
6 June	Ulsan Hyundai FC	A	0–2		4,752	5th

Pos	Team	Pld	W	D	L	GF	GA	GD	Pts	SEO	JJU	USH	SIC	GWJ
1	FC Seoul	4	2	2	0	8	2	+6	8	—	5–1	—	2–0	—
2	Jeju United	4	2	1	1	7	7	0	7	—	—	3–1	—	2–0
3	Ulsan Hyundai	4	1	2	1	7	7	0	5	1–1	—	—	—	2–0
4	Seongnam Ilhwa Chunma	4	0	3	1	5	7	−2	3	—	1–1	3–3	—	—
5	Gwangju Sangmu	4	0	2	2	1	5	−4	2	0–0	—	—	1–1	—

Source: RSSSF

== Squad statistics ==
=== Appearances and goals ===
Statistics accurate as of match played 7 November 2010

No.	Nat.	Pos.	Name	League		FA Cup		League Cup		Appearances		Goals
No.	Nat.	Pos.	Name	Apps	Goals	Apps	Goals	Apps	Goals	App (sub)	Total	Goals
1	(South Korea)	GK	Seong Kyung-Il	2	0	0	0	4	0	6 (0)	6	0
2	(South Korea)	DF	Oh Chang-Sik	2	0	0	0	0	0	2 (0)	2	0
3	(South Korea)	DF	Park Byung-Gyu	23	0	3	0	3	0	29 (0)	29	0
4	(South Korea)	MF	Kim Young-Sam	14 (1)	0	2	0	4	0	20 (1)	21	0
5	(South Korea)	DF	Bae Hyo-Sung	22	0	2	0	4	0	28 (0)	28	0
6	(South Korea)	MF	Hwang Sun-Pil	8 (2)	0	0 (2)	0	3	0	11 (4)	15	0
7	(South Korea)	MF	Park Won-Hong	0 (5)	1	0 (1)	1	0 (3)	0	0 (9)	9	2
8	(South Korea)	MF	Park Seung-Min	1 (6)	0	0 (2)	0	3 (1)	0	4 (9)	13	0
9	(South Korea)	MF	Park Sang-Wook	1	0	0	0	0	0	1 (0)	1	0
10	(South Korea)	FW	Choi Sung-Kuk	21 (1)	4	3	1	2	0	26 (1)	27	5
11	(South Korea)	MF	Jeon Kwang-Hwan	23 (2)	0	3	1	1	0	27 (2)	29	1
12	(South Korea)	MF	Kim Bum-Soo	2 (3)	0	0	0	0	0	2 (3)	5	0
13	(South Korea)	DF	Choi Won-Kwon	20	3	2	1	4	0	26 (0)	26	4
14	(South Korea)	MF	Kim Jung-Woo	18 (1)	3	1 (1)	0	0	0	19 (2)	21	3
15	(South Korea)	DF	Jeong Ho-Jin	0	0	0	0	0	0	0	0	0
16	(South Korea)	MF	Seo Min-Gook	8 (11)	0	2 (1)	0	3 (1)	0	13 (13)	26	0
17	(South Korea)	DF	Kim Soo-Yeon	2 (1)	1	0	0	0	0	2 (1)	3	1
18	(South Korea)	MF	Kang Gu-Nam	3 (1)	0	0	0	0 (2)	0	3 (3)	6	0
19	(South Korea)	MF	Park Jin-Ok	5 (5)	0	0 (1)	0	0	0	5 (6)	11	0
20	(South Korea)	MF	Kim Tae-Min	9 (2)	0	1	0	0	0	10 (2)	12	0
21	(South Korea)	GK	Lim In-Sung	1	0	0	0	0	0	1 (0)	1	0
22	(South Korea)	DF	Jang Hyun-Kyu	20 (1)	0	2	0	0	0	22 (1)	23	0
23	(South Korea)	MF	Kim Young-jun	0	0	0	0	0	0	0	0	0
24	(South Korea)	DF	Park Jung-Sik	0	0	0	0	0	0	0	0	0
25	(South Korea)	FW	Cho Yong-Tae	9 (3)	2	1 (1)	1	3	1	13 (4)	17	4
26	(South Korea)	MF	Jung Kyung-ho	19 (3)	0	1	0	1 (2)	0	21 (5)	26	0
27	(South Korea)	FW	Ju Kwang-Youn	11 (4)	0	1	0	1	0	13 (4)	17	0
28	(South Korea)	FW	Kim Dong-hyun	13 (3)	3	3	1	3	0	19 (3)	22	4
29	(South Korea)	MF	Chun Je-Hun	0 (1)	0	0	0	0	0	0 (1)	1	0
30	(South Korea)	DF	Yoon Yeo-San	8 (4)	0	1 (1)	0	4	0	13 (5)	18	0
31	(South Korea)	GK	Kim Jee-Hyuk	25 (1)	0	3	0	0	0	28 (1)	29	0
32	(South Korea)	FW	Lee Je-Kyu	0	0	0	0	0	0	0	0	0
33	(South Korea)	MF	Kim Min-O	4	0	1	0	0	0	5 (0)	5	0
34	(South Korea)	MF	Kwak Chul-Ho	0 (1)	0	0	0	0	0	0 (1)	1	0
35	(South Korea)	DF	Cho Jae-Yong	2 (1)	0	0	0	0	0	2 (1)	3	0
36	(South Korea)	DF	Yoon Sin-Young	0	0	0	0	0 (2)	0	0 (2)	2	0
37	(South Korea)	MF	Kim Ji-min	2	0	0	0	0	0	2 (0)	2	0
38	(South Korea)	MF	Byun Woong	6 (4)	0	1	0	0	0	7 (4)	11	0
39	(South Korea)	DF	Kim Ju-Hwan	0 (1)	0	0	0	0	0	0 (1)	1	0
40	(South Korea)	DF	Kim Sun-Woo	4 (2)	0	0	0	0	0	4 (2)	6	0
42	(South Korea)	FW	Byun Yoon-Cheol	0	0	0	0	0	0	0	0	0

=== Top scorers ===
Position	Nation	Number	Name	K-League	KFA Cup	League Cup	Total
1	(South Korea)	10	Choi Sung-Kuk	4	1	0	5
2	(South Korea)	13	Choi Won-Kwon	3	1	0	4
=	(South Korea)	28	Kim Dong-hyun	3	1	0	4
=	(South Korea)	25	Cho Yong-Tae	2	1	1	4
3	(South Korea)	14	Kim Jung-Woo	3	0	0	3
4	(South Korea)	7	Park Won-Hong	1	1	0	2
5	(South Korea)	11	Jeon Kwang-Hwan	0	1	0	1
=	(South Korea)	17	Kim Soo-Yeon	1	0	0	1
/	/	/	Own Goals	0	0	0	0
			TOTALS	17	6	1	24

=== Discipline ===
Position	Nation	Number	Name	K-League		KFA Cup		League Cup		Total	
Position	Nation	Number	Name	Booked	Sent off (straight red)	Booked	Sent off (straight red)	Booked	Sent off (straight red)	Booked	Sent off (straight red)
GK	(South Korea)	1	Seong Kyung-Il	0	1	0	0	1	0	1	1
DF	(South Korea)	3	Park Byung-Gyu	3	0	0	0	0	0	3	0
MF	(South Korea)	4	Kim Young-Sam	2	0	0	0	1	0	3	0
DF	(South Korea)	5	Bae Hyo-Sung	5	0	2	0	1	0	8	0
MF	(South Korea)	6	Hwang Sun-Pil	4	0	1	0	0	0	5	0
FW	(South Korea)	10	Choi Sung-Kuk	5	1	0	0	0	0	5	1
MF	(South Korea)	11	Jeon Kwang-Hwan	1	0	1	0	0	0	2	0
MF	(South Korea)	12	Kim Bum-Soo	1	0	0	0	0	0	1	0
MF	(South Korea)	13	Choi Won-Kwon	4	1	0	0	2	0	6	1
MF	(South Korea)	14	Kim Jung-Woo	3	0	0	0	0	0	3	0
MF	(South Korea)	16	Seo Min-Gook	1	0	0	0	0	0	1	0
DF	(South Korea)	17	Kim Soo-Yeon	1	0	0	0	0	0	1	0
MF	(South Korea)	20	Kim Tae-Min	3	0	0	0	0	0	3	0
DF	(South Korea)	22	Jang Hyun-Kyu	1	0	2	0	0	0	3	0
MF	(South Korea)	26	Jung Kyung-ho	3	0	0	0	0	0	3	0
FW	(South Korea)	27	Ju Kwang-Youn	4	2	0	0	0	0	4	2
FW	(South Korea)	28	Kim Dong-hyun	4	0	0	0	1	0	5	0
DF	(South Korea)	30	Yoon Yeo-San	6	0	0	0	1	0	7	0
GK	(South Korea)	31	Kim Jee-Hyuk	2	0	0	0	0	0	2	0
/	/	/	TOTALS	53	5	6	0	7	0	66	5

== Transfer ==
=== In ===
Date	Pos.	Name	From	Source
18 January 2010	MF	(South Korea) Kim Jung-Woo	(South Korea) Seongnam Ilhwa Chunma	
18 January 2010	FW	(South Korea) Kim Dong-hyun	(South Korea) Gyeongnam FC	
18 January 2010	DF	(South Korea) Cho Jae-Yong	(South Korea) Gyeongnam FC	
18 January 2010	FW	(South Korea) Ju Kwang-Youn	(South Korea) Chunnam Dragons	
18 January 2010	MF	(South Korea) Jung Kyung-ho	(South Korea) Chunnam Dragons	
18 January 2010	MF	(South Korea) Kim Young-Sam	(South Korea) Ulsan Hyundai FC	
18 January 2010	MF	(South Korea) Byun Woong	(South Korea) Ulsan Hyundai FC	
18 January 2010	DF	(South Korea) Oh Chang-Sik	(South Korea) Ulsan Hyundai FC	
18 January 2010	MF	(South Korea) Kim Min-O	(South Korea) Ulsan Hyundai FC	
18 January 2010	GK	(South Korea) Kim Jee-Hyuk	(South Korea) Pohang Steelers	
18 January 2010	DF	(South Korea) Yoon Yeo-San	(South Korea) Daegu FC	
18 January 2010	DF	(South Korea) Kim Ju-Hwan	(South Korea) Daegu FC	
18 January 2010	DF	(South Korea) Park Jung-Sik	(South Korea) Daegu FC	
18 January 2010	FW	(South Korea) Cho Yong-Tae	(South Korea) Suwon Samsung Bluewings	
18 January 2010	FW	(South Korea) Lee Je-Kyu	(South Korea) Daejeon Citizen	
18 January 2010	FW	(South Korea) Kwak Chul-Ho	(South Korea) Daejeon Citizen	
18 January 2010	MF	(South Korea) Kim Ji-min	(South Korea) Daejeon Citizen	
18 January 2010	DF	(South Korea) Yoon Sin-Young	(South Korea) Daejeon Citizen	
18 January 2010	GK	(South Korea) Lim In-Sung	(South Korea) Incheon United	
18 January 2010	DF	(South Korea) Kim Sun-Woo	(South Korea) Incheon United	

=== Out ===
Date	Pos.	Name	To	Source
30 October 2010	DF	(South Korea) Bae Hyo-Sung	(South Korea) Busan I'Park	
30 October 2010	DF	(South Korea) Jeong Ho-Jin	(South Korea) Busan Kyotong	
30 October 2010	DF	(South Korea) Hwang Sun-Pil	(South Korea) Daegu FC	
30 October 2010	MF	(South Korea) Kwon Hyuk-Jin	(South Korea) Daejeon Citizen	
30 October 2010	MF	(South Korea) Kang Gu-Nam	(South Korea) Daejeon Citizen	
30 October 2010	DF	(South Korea) Choi Won-Kwon	(South Korea) FC Seoul	
30 October 2010	MF	(South Korea) Chun Je-Hun	(South Korea) FC Seoul	
30 October 2010	GK	(South Korea) Seong Kyung-Il	(South Korea) Gyeongnam FC	
30 October 2010	MF	(South Korea) Park Seung-Min	(South Korea) Incheon United FC	
30 October 2010	MF	(South Korea) Seo Min-Gook	(South Korea) Incheon United FC	
30 October 2010	FW	(South Korea) Byun Yoon-Cheol	(South Korea) Incheon United FC	
30 October 2010	MF	(South Korea) Park Jin-Ok	(South Korea) Jeju United FC	
30 October 2010	MF	(South Korea) Kim Tae-Min	(South Korea) Jeju United FC	
30 October 2010	MF	(South Korea) Jeon Kwang-Hwan	(South Korea) Jeonbuk Hyundai Motors	
30 October 2010	DF	(South Korea) Jang Hyun-Kyu	(South Korea) Pohang Steelers	
30 October 2010	DF	(South Korea) Kim Soo-Yeon	(South Korea) Pohang Steelers	
30 October 2010	MF	(South Korea) Kim Bum-Soo	(South Korea) Seongnam Ilhwa Chunma	
30 October 2010	FW	(South Korea) Choi Sung-Kuk	(South Korea) Seongnam Ilhwa Chunma	
30 October 2010	DF	(South Korea) Park Byung-Gyu	(South Korea) Ulsan Hyundai FC	
30 October 2010	MF	(South Korea) Park Won-Hong	(South Korea) Ulsan Hyundai FC	
30 October 2010	MF	(South Korea) Park Sang-Uk	(South Korea) Ulsan Hyundai FC	
30 October 2010	MF	(South Korea) Kim Young-jun	(South Korea) Ulsan Hyundai FC	
