= 2009 Korean FA Cup =

2009 Hana Bank FA Cup

Tournament details
- Country: South Korea

Final positions
- Champions: Suwon Samsung Bluewings (2nd title)
- Runners-up: Seongnam Ilhwa Chunma

Tournament statistics
- Top goal scorer: Stevica Ristić (5 goals)

Awards
- Best player: Lee Woon-jae

The 2009 Korean FA Cup, known as the 2009 Hana Bank FA Cup, was the 14th edition of the Korean FA Cup. It began on 1 March 2009, and ended on 8 November 2009. Suwon Samsung Bluewings won their second title, and qualified for the 2010 AFC Champions League.

== Qualifying rounds ==
=== First round ===
1 March 2009	Hanyang University	1–0	Dongguk University	Cheonan Football Center
	Ju Min-kyu 75'

1 March 2009	Cheongju Jikji	2–2 (7–6 p)	Samcheok Shinwoo Electronics	Cheonan Football Center
	Lee Ki-dong 80', 90'		Ko Hwa-seop; Jeong Jun-ho

1 March 2009	Seoul United	1–0	Yongin FC	Cheonan Football Center
	Kang Hyun-jin 44'

1 March 2009	Chung-Ang University	7–1	A-hyun FC	Cheonan Football Center
	Kim Pyung-rae 25'; Lee Ji-hoon 29'; Lee Hyo-min 31', 52'; Yoo Seung-chul 72'; Kim Sung-joon 79'; Choi Yeon-ho 87'		Kwon Woo-jin 62'

1 March 2009	Gumi Siltron	2–1	Gwangju Gwangsan	Gimcheon Stadium
	Woo Min-hyuk 9'; Jeon Jun-yeon 72'		Kim Byung-woon 59'

1 March 2009	Sun Moon University	1–0	Yangju FC	Gimcheon Stadium
	Lee Haeng-soo 22'

=== Second round ===
7 March 2009	Kyung Hee University	1–1 (5–4 p)	Hanyang University	Cheonan Football Center
	Lee Dong-hyun 90'		Jeong Da-seul 75'

7 March 2009	Jeonju University	0–1	Seoul United	Cheonan Football Center
			Shin Jin-won 65'

7 March 2009	Korea University	1–1 (5–4 p)	Cheongju Jikji	Cheonan Football Center
	Lee Yong 75'		Sung Hwan-woong 50'

7 March 2009	Hongik University	0–1	Chung-Ang University	Cheonan Football Center
			Lee Nam-yong 34'

7 March 2009	Yonsei University	0–2	Gumi Siltron	Gimcheon Stadium
			Kim Young-jun 4'; Woo Min-hyuk 56'

7 March 2009	Soongsil University	0–1	Sun Moon University	Gimcheon Stadium
			Kim Jung-min 24'

=== Third round ===
8 March 2009	Kyung Hee University	1–1 (4–3 p)	Seoul United	Cheonan Football Center
	Kang Joo-ho 78'		Kim Dong-hae 72'

8 March 2009	Korea University	1–1 (4–5 p)	Chung-Ang University	Cheonan Football Center
	Park Hee-sung 58'		Sim Jae-myung 39'

8 March 2009	Gumi Siltron	2–2 (1–4 p)	Sun Moon University	Gimcheon Stadium
	Park Jin-han 55'; Jeong Jun-yeon 78'		Lee Haeng-soo 59', 70'

== Final rounds ==
=== Bracket ===
Round of 32
Gyeongnam FC	1
Ansan Hallelujah	0
Daegu FC	3
Suwon City	1
Daejeon Citizen	2
Cheonan City	0
Incheon United	0
Kyung Hee University	1
Seongnam Ilhwa Chunma	5
Busan Transportation Corporation	2
Sun Moon University	0 (2)
Chung-Ang University (p)	0 (4)
Ulsan Hyundai	1 (5)
Goyang KB Kookmin Bank (p)	1 (7)
Pohang Steelers	7
Hongcheon Idu	1
Busan IPark	2
Hyundai Mipo Dockyard	1
Suwon Samsung Bluewings	1
Nowon Hummel Korea	0
Jeonnam Dragons	2
Daejeon KHNP	1
Gangwon FC (p)	2 (4)
Incheon Korail	2 (3)
Jeju United (p)	0 (5)
Gangneung City	0 (3)
Yesan FC	0
Gwangju Sangmu	5
Jeonbuk Hyundai Motors	1
Changwon City	0
FC Seoul	2
Gimhae City	0

Round of 16
Gyeongnam FC	0 (4)
Daegu FC (p)	0 (5)
Daejeon Citizen	2
Kyung Hee University	1
Seongnam Ilhwa Chunma	1
Chung-Ang University	0
Goyang KB Kookmin Bank	0
Pohang Steelers	4
Busan IPark	0
Suwon Samsung Bluewings	1
Jeonnam Dragons	1
Gangwon FC	0
Jeju United (p)	1 (4)
Gwangju Sangmu	1 (3)
Jeonbuk Hyundai Motors	3
FC Seoul	1

Quarter-finals
Daegu FC	1 (3)
Daejeon Citizen (p)	1 (5)
Seongnam Ilhwa Chunma	2
Pohang Steelers	1
Suwon Samsung Bluewings	3
Jeonnam Dragons	0
Jeju United	2
Jeonbuk Hyundai Motors	5

Semi-finals
7 October – Daejeon
Daejeon Citizen	0
Seongnam Ilhwa Chunma	1
7 October – Suwon
Suwon Samsung Bluewings	3
Jeonbuk Hyundai Motors	0

Final
8 November – Seongnam
Seongnam Ilhwa Chunma	1 (2)
Suwon Samsung Bluewings (p)	1 (4)

=== Round of 32 ===
13 May 2009	Gyeongnam FC	1–0	Ansan Hallelujah	Changwon Civil Stadium
17:00 UTC+9	Índio 68'

13 May 2009	Sun Moon University	0–0 (2–4 p)	Chung-Ang University
17:00 UTC+9

13 May 2009	Pohang Steelers	7–1	Hongcheon Idu	Steelyard Stadium
19:00 UTC+9	Cho Chan-ho 12'; Ristić 13', 38', 89'; Noh Byung-joon 19', 59'; Lee Seon-hoo 28' (o.g.)		Lee Seon-hoo 51'

13 May 2009	Incheon United	0–1	Kyung Hee University	Incheon Munhak Stadium
19:00 UTC+9			Yoon Dong-min 90'

13 May 2009	Ulsan Hyundai	1–1 (5–7 p)	Goyang KB Kookmin Bank	Ulsan Munsu Football Stadium
19:00 UTC+9	Kim Shin-wook 74'		Kang Seok-koo 43'
	Penalties
	Yoo Ho-joon (penalty scored); Lee Sang-don (penalty scored); Lee Won-jae (penalty scored); Hyun Young-min (penalty scored); Lee Dong-won (penalty scored); Park Joon-tae (penalty missed)		(penalty scored) Park Seong-jin; (penalty scored) Han Soo-bin; (penalty scored) Kim Hyeon-gi; (penalty scored) Sin Seung-pil; (penalty scored) Ryu Byung-hoon; (penalty scored) Yun Sang-hyeok; (penalty scored) Park Byeong-won

13 May 2009	Jeju United	0–0 (5–3 p)	Gangneung City	Jeju World Cup Stadium
19:00 UTC+9
	Penalties
	Ricardinho (penalty scored); Chun Jae-woon (penalty scored); Shim Young-sung (penalty scored); Gu Ja-cheol (penalty scored); Jóbson (penalty scored)		(penalty scored) Go Min-gi; (penalty missed) Kim Yong-hee; (penalty scored) Park Gyung-sam; (penalty scored) Na Il-gyun

13 May 2009	Daejeon Citizen	2–0	Cheonan City	Daejeon World Cup Stadium
19:00 UTC+9	Ko Chang-hyun 27'; Lee Kyung-hwan 89'

13 May 2009	Daegu FC	3–1	Suwon City	Daegu Stadium
19:00 UTC+9	Cho Hyung-ik 59'; Popović 61'; Lee Hyun-chang 68'		Park Jong-chan 51'

13 May 2009	Jeonnam Dragons	2–1	Daejeon KHNP	Gwangyang Football Stadium
19:00 UTC+9	Kim Myung-woon 19'; Adriano Chuva 88'		Kim Jeong-gyeom 32'

13 May 2009	Gangwon FC	2–2 (4–3 p)	Incheon Korail	Gangneung Stadium
19:30 UTC+9	Lee Se-in 27' 47'		Kim Hyung-woon 24'; Huh Shin-young 59'
	Penalties
	Park Jong-jin (penalty missed); Kwon Soon-hyung (penalty scored); Lee Sung-min (penalty missed); Caion (penalty scored); Lee Se-in (penalty scored); Jung Chul-woon (penalty scored)		(penalty scored) Kim Heung-seop; (penalty missed) Han Byung-yong; (penalty scored) Bae Seul-ki; (penalty scored) Kang Hyun-woo; (penalty missed) Woo Ju-young; (penalty missed) Lee Kyung-min

13 May 2009	Seongnam Ilhwa Chunma	5–2	Busan Transportation Corporation	Tancheon Sports Complex
19:30 UTC+9	Mota 4', 56', 78'; Han Dong-won 49'; Cho Dong-geon 79'		Ha Tae-keun 24'; Jang Ji-soo 83'

13 May 2009	Jeonbuk Hyundai Motors	1–0	Changwon City	Jeonju World Cup Stadium
19:30 UTC+9	Jin Kyung-sun 69'

13 May 2009	Suwon Samsung Bluewings	1–0	Nowon Hummel Korea	Suwon World Cup Stadium
19:30 UTC+9	Li Weifeng 69'

13 May 2009	Busan IPark	2–1	Hyundai Mipo Dockyard	Busan Asiad Main Stadium
20:00 UTC+9	Park Hee-do 70'; Yang Dong-hyun 71'		Kim Kyung-ryeol 79'

13 May 2009	Yesan FC	0–5	Gwangju Sangmu	Asan Stadium
20:00 UTC+9			Park Won-hong 17', 48'; Choi Jae-soo 47'; Seo Min-gook 55', 65'

13 May 2009	FC Seoul	2–0	Gimhae City	Seoul World Cup Stadium
20:00 UTC+9	Kim Chi-gon 56'; Lee Sang-hyup 80'

=== Round of 16 ===
1 July 2009	Busan IPark	0–1	Suwon Samsung Bluewings	Busan Asiad Main Stadium
			Baek Ji-hoon 28'

1 July 2009	Goyang KB Kookmin Bank	0–4	Pohang Steelers	Goyang Stadium
			Ristić 40', 54'; Kim Gi-dong 49', 65'

1 July 2009	Jeju United	1–1 (a.e.t.) (4–3 p)	Gwangju Sangmu	Jeju World Cup Stadium
	Bang Seung-hwan 66'		Bae Hyo-sung 90'
	Penalties
	Ricardinho (penalty missed); Shim Young-sung (penalty scored); Jóbson (penalty scored); Cho Yong-hyung (penalty scored); Choi Hyun-youn (penalty missed); Esquerdinha (penalty scored)		(penalty missed) Choi Won-kwon; (penalty scored) Kim Tae-min; (penalty scored) Park Jin-ok; (penalty scored) Park Won-hong; (penalty missed) Seo Min-gook; (penalty missed) Bae Hyo-sung

1 July 2009	Daejeon Citizen	2–1 (a.e.t.)	Kyung Hee University	Daejeon World Cup Stadium
	Hwang Ji-yoon 36'; Lee Je-kyu 92'		Kim Hyung-pil 61'

1 July 2009	Jeonnam Dragons	1–0	Gangwon FC	Gwangyang Football Stadium
	Baek Seung-min 52'

1 July 2009	Jeonbuk Hyundai Motors	3–1	FC Seoul	Jeonju World Cup Stadium
	Lee Hyun-seung 20'; Lee Dong-gook 55', 80'		Jung Jo-gook 90+1'

1 July 2009	Gyeongnam FC	0–0 (a.e.t.) (4–5 p)	Daegu FC	Changwon Civil Stadium
	Penalties
	Kim Dong-chan (penalty scored); Lee Hun (penalty scored); Song Ho-young (penalty scored); Kazuyuki Toda (penalty scored); Lee Jae-il (penalty missed); Cho Jae-yong (penalty missed)		(penalty scored) Lee Seul-ki; (penalty missed) Kim Ju-hwan; (penalty scored) Kim Min-kyun; (penalty scored) Bang Dae-jong; (penalty scored) Kim Chang-hee; (penalty scored) Choi Jong-hyuk

1 July 2009	Seongnam Ilhwa Chunma	1–0	Chung-Ang University	Seongnam 2 Stadium
	Kim Jung-woo 90+1'

=== Quarter-finals ===
15 July 2009	Daegu FC	1–1 (a.e.t.) (3–5 p)	Daejeon Citizen	Daegu Stadium
UTC+9 19:00	Lee Seul-gi 49'		Na Kwang-hyun 72'
	Penalties
	Lee Seul-gi (penalty scored); Bang Dae-jong (penalty missed); Valdeir (penalty scored); Kim Chang-hee (penalty scored)		(penalty scored) Kwon Jip; (penalty scored) Kim Ji-min; (penalty scored) Hwang Ji-yoon; (penalty scored) Lee Je-kyu; (penalty scored) Račić

15 July 2009	Suwon Samsung Bluewings	3–0	Jeonnam Dragons	Suwon World Cup Stadium
UTC+9 19:30	Lee Sang-ho 21'; Yang Sang-min 70'; Hong Soon-hak 90'

15 July 2009	Seongnam Ilhwa Chunma	2–1	Pohang Steelers	Seongnam 2 Stadium
UTC+9 19:30	Radončić 7'; Kim Jin-yong 65'		Park Hee-chul 37'

15 July 2009	Jeju United	2–5 (a.e.t.)	Jeonbuk Hyundai Motors	Jeju World Cup Stadium
UTC+9 19:00	Koo Ja-cheol 65'; Jóbson 78'		Ha Dae-sung 13'; Lee Hyun-seung 59'; Lee Dong-gook 98', 102'; Eninho 115'

=== Semi-finals ===
7 October 2009	Suwon Samsung Bluewings	3–0	Jeonbuk Hyundai Motors	Suwon World Cup Stadium
UTC+9 19:30	Tiago 35'; Kim Do-heon 53'; Wan Houliang 90+3' (o.g.)

7 October 2009	Daejeon Citizen	0–1	Seongnam Ilhwa Chunma	Daejeon World Cup Stadium
UTC+9 19:30			Molina 30'

=== Final ===
8 November 2009	Seongnam Ilhwa Chunma	1–1 (a.e.t.) (2–4 p)	Suwon Samsung Bluewings	Seongnam Stadium
UTC+9 14:00	Radončić 27'		Edu 87' (pen.)	Referee: Choi Gwang-bo
	Penalties
	Ognenovski (penalty scored); Radončić (penalty scored); Kim Sung-hwan (penalty missed); Jeon Kwang-jin (penalty missed)		Edu (penalty scored); Yang Sang-min (penalty scored); Tiago (penalty missed); Kim Do-heon (penalty scored); Kim Dae-eui (penalty scored)

== Awards ==
=== Main awards ===
Award	Winner	Team
Most Valuable Player	(South Korea) Lee Woon-jae	Suwon Samsung Bluewings
Top goalscorer	(North Macedonia) Stevica Ristić	Pohang Steelers
Best Manager	(South Korea) Cha Bum-kun	Suwon Samsung Bluewings
Fair Play Award	Daejeon Citizen	

=== Man of the Round ===
Round	Winner	Team
Round of 32	(Brazil) Mota	Seongnam Ilhwa Chunma
Round of 16	(South Korea) Kwon Sun-tae	Jeonbuk Hyundai Motors
Quarter-finals	(South Korea) Lee Dong-gook	Jeonbuk Hyundai Motors
Semi-finals	(South Korea) Kim Do-heon	Suwon Samsung Bluewings

== See also ==
- 2009 in South Korean football
- 2009 K League
- 2009 Korea National League
- 2009 K3 League
- 2009 U-League
- 2009 Korean League Cup
