= 2011 South Korean football match-fixing scandal =

Large-scale coordinated match-fixing scandal

The 2011 South Korean football match-fixing scandal was a large-scale match-fixing scandal, which occurred in K League and Korean League Cup since 2010 and was revealed in 2011. A total of 57 footballers were charged with the scandal and 55 players among them were punished.

== Background ==
The match-fixing scandals in South Korean football began between amateur players in 2008.

K3 League club Seoul Pabal was shut down by the Korean FA after a significant number of its players were convicted of dealing with a Chinese betting site, and four Korea National League players were also prosecuted for their involvement.

The inception of this scandal was the alleged suicide of Incheon United player Yoon Ki-won on 6 May 2011: his suicide was amplified with the match-fixing allegations via media and football fans. The press heard from staffs of K League clubs that brokers and gangsters had made approaches to players in the previous year.

After an arrest warrant was issued for two football players on 25 May by the Supreme Prosecutors' Office of the Republic of Korea, the K League's match-fixing case began to surface.

The prosecutors arrested two brokers and were investigating ten players, including former national team member Kim Dong-hyun.

== First investigation ==
The reports of the arrests of two footballers by the South Korean media led to the exposure of the initial match-fixing scandals in the K League. The arrested footballers were Park Sang-wook of Daejeon Citizen and Sung Kyung-mo of Gwangju FC.

On 27 May, four players of Daejeon Citizen were also arrested and more extensive investigations were held into match fixing.

On 30 May, former footballer Jung Jong-kwan, who played for Jeonbuk Hyundai Motors was found dead in an apparent suicide. In his suicide note, he said "I'm ashamed of myself as a person involved in the match-fixing scandal. Those under investigation are all my friends and they haven't blown my name because of friendship. All is my fault and I got them involved."

On 17 June, the Changwon branch of Supreme Prosecutors' Office announced an investigation result of match fixing. Ten football players were banned from playing in the South Korean football permanently. Pohang Steelers player Kim Jung-kyum did not directly come in with match fixing, but was banned for five years in South Korean football, because he made unfair profits from the knowledge of match fixing. Daejeon Citizen's dividend of Sports Toto was reduced by 30% for the 2011 season, and Gwangju FC and Sangju Sangmu Phoenix were reduced by 10% each. (Sports Toto was a legal betting business of South Korean government.)

== Second investigation ==
After the end of the first investigation focused on Daejeon Citizen, Changwon branch of Supreme Prosecutors' Office and the military prosecution broadened the scope of their investigation against Jeonnam Dragons' players. Players who turned themselves in to the prosecutor also appeared, while the number of players summoned by the prosecutor was increasing.

On 29 June, another South Korean international Choi Sung-kuk voluntarily confessed that he attended a conspiracy, but did not participate in match fixing.

On 7 July, Changwon Prosecutors' Office announced that ten players including retired players were arrested on suspicion of match fixing, 33 players including retired players were under indictment, and three players were summarily indicted. Choi Sung-kuk was also indicted for participating in match fixing.

On 12 July, Sangju Sangmu Phoenix manager Lee Soo-chul was arrested for accepting bribes and intimidation charges in 2010 season. One of the indicted players, Do Hwa-sung, was running his private betting site, and it was discovered by investigators.

On 3 August, Changwon Prosecutors' Office lastly announced four more indicted players.

On 25 August, K League Federation announced that 40 of the 46 indicted players in the second investigation were banned for life from football. However, it gave 25 players who had confessed to police the possibility to reduce their punishment.

== Affected matches ==
The Changwon branch of Supreme Prosecutors' Office concluded that nineteen matches in the 2010 season and two matches in the 2011 season were fixed.

Clubs in bold had players involved in match fixing.

Competition	Date	Home	Result	Away	Match-fixing result
2010 Korean League Cup	2 June 2010	**Gwangju Sangmu**	1–1	Seongnam Ilhwa Chunma	Failure
2010 Korean League Cup	6 June 2010	Ulsan Hyundai	2–0	**Gwangju Sangmu**	Success
2010 Korean League Cup	6 June 2010	FC Seoul	5–1	**Gwangju Sangmu**	Success
2010 K League	17 July 2010	**Daejeon Citizen**	0–4	Jeonbuk Hyundai Motors	Success
2010 K League	18 July 2010	**Daegu FC**	1–3	Suwon Samsung Bluewings	Success
2010 K League	24 July 2010	**Incheon United**	2–3	Jeju United	Success
2010 K League	25 July 2010	**Daegu FC**	1–1	Gyeongnam FC	Failure
2010 K League	31 July 2010	Gyeongnam FC	3–2	**Incheon United**	Success
2010 K League	7 August 2010	**Daegu FC**	1–3	Daejeon Citizen	Success
2010 K League	7 August 2010	Jeju United	4–0	**Gwangju Sangmu**	Success
2010 K League	28 August 2010	**Gwangju Sangmu**	1–1	Gyeongnam FC	Success
2010 K League	29 August 2010	Busan IPark	5–3	**Jeonnam Dragons**	Success
2010 K League	4 September 2010	Jeonnam Dragons	3–0	**Daejeon Citizen**	Success
2010 K League	18 September 2010	Ulsan Hyundai	3–0	**Jeonnam Dragons**	Success
2010 K League	19 September 2010	Daejeon Citizen	3–0	**Gwangju Sangmu**	Success
2010 K League	9 October 2010	FC Seoul	3–2	**Gyeongnam FC**	Success
2010 K League	27 October 2010	**Busan IPark**	0–1	Suwon Samsung Bluewings	Success
2010 K League	27 October 2010	**Jeju United**	1–1	FC Seoul	Failure
2010 K League	3 November 2010	**Gwangju Sangmu**	0–1	Jeonnam Dragons	Success
2011 Korean League Cup	6 April 2011	Busan IPark	1–0	**Gwangju FC**	Success
2011 Korean League Cup	6 April 2011	**Daejeon Citizen**	0–3	Pohang Steelers	Success

== Indicted players ==
Match fixers (47)
Daejeon Citizen (13)	Gwangju Sangmu (10)	Jeonnam Dragons (7)	Daegu FC (6)	Incheon United (5)
Hwang Ji-yoon; Kang Gu-nam; Kim Ba-woo; Kwak Chang-hee; Kwon Jip; Lee Jung-won; Lee Kyung-hwan; Lee Myeong-cheol; Ou Kyoung-jun; Park Jung-hye; Park Sang-wook; Sin Jun-bae; Yang Jung-min	Choi Sung-kuk; Chun Je-hun; Jang Hyun-kyu; Kim Beom-su; Kim Dong-hyun; Kim Soo-yeon; Park Byung-gyu; Seo Min-gook; Seong Kyung-il; Yoon Yeo-san	Baek Seung-min; Jung Yoon-sung; Kim Hyung-ho; Lee Sang-hong; Park Ji-yong; Song Jung-hyun; Yeom Dong-gyun	An Sung-min; Cho Hyung-ik; Jang Nam-seok; Lee Sang-duk; Oh Ju-hyun; Yang Seung-won	Ahn Hyun-sik; Do Hwa-sung; Lee Jun-young; Lee Se-ju; Park Chang-heon
Hwang Ji-yoon; Kang Gu-nam; Kim Ba-woo; Kwak Chang-hee; Kwon Jip; Lee Jung-won; Lee Kyung-hwan; Lee Myeong-cheol; Ou Kyoung-jun; Park Jung-hye; Park Sang-wook; Sin Jun-bae; Yang Jung-min	Choi Sung-kuk; Chun Je-hun; Jang Hyun-kyu; Kim Beom-su; Kim Dong-hyun; Kim Soo-yeon; Park Byung-gyu; Seo Min-gook; Seong Kyung-il; Yoon Yeo-san	Jeju United (3)	Gyeongnam FC (2)	Gwangju FC (1)
Hwang Ji-yoon; Kang Gu-nam; Kim Ba-woo; Kwak Chang-hee; Kwon Jip; Lee Jung-won; Lee Kyung-hwan; Lee Myeong-cheol; Ou Kyoung-jun; Park Jung-hye; Park Sang-wook; Sin Jun-bae; Yang Jung-min	Choi Sung-kuk; Chun Je-hun; Jang Hyun-kyu; Kim Beom-su; Kim Dong-hyun; Kim Soo-yeon; Park Byung-gyu; Seo Min-gook; Seong Kyung-il; Yoon Yeo-san	Choi Sung-hyun; Kim In-ho; Kim Myeong-hwan	Kim Tae-wook; Lee Hun	Sung Kyung-mo

Bettor of fixed match (1)

- Kim Jung-kyum (Pohang Steelers)

Bribed players uninvolved in match fixing (7)

- Hong Seong-yo (Busan IPark)
- Kim Eung-jin (Busan IPark)
- Lee Jung-ho (Busan IPark)
- Ju Kwang-youn (Gwangju Sangmu)
- Kim Jee-hyuk (Gwangju Sangmu)
- Lim In-sung (Gwangju Sangmu)
- Park Sang-cheol (Jeonnam Dragons)

Acquitted players (2)

- Kim Seung-hyun (Jeonnam Dragons)
- On Byung-hoon (Daegu FC)
