= Cheonan Football Center =

Football stadium and training ground in South Korea

Cheonan Football Center 천안축구센터
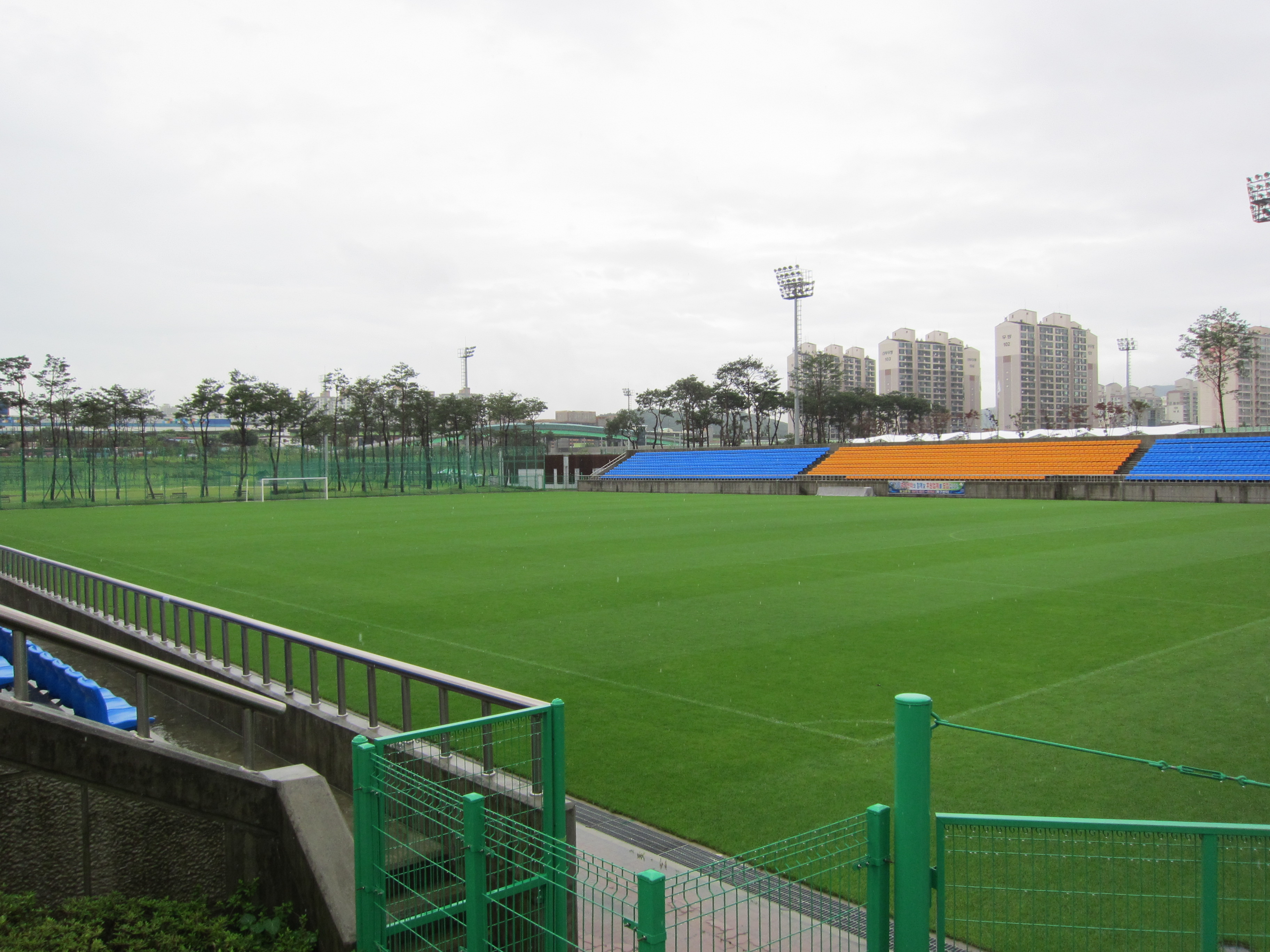
- Interactive map of Cheonan Football Center 천안축구센터
- Location: Cheonan, South Chungcheong Province, South Korea
- Coordinates: 36.8217°N 127.147°E
- Operator: Cheonan City Facilities Management Corporation
- Capacity: 2,881
- Field size: 116 by 79 metres (127 by 86 yards)

Construction
- Groundbreaking: March 2006; 20 years ago
- Opened: October 2008; 17 years ago

Tenants
- Cheonan FC (2008–2015); Cheonan City FC (2008–2019, 2022)

The Cheonan Football Center Stadium (Korean: 천안축구센터) is a football-specific stadium and training ground in Cheonan, South Korea. The stadium holds 2,881 spectators. It was built in 2008.

It is the former home of the Korea National League side Cheonan FC and the K3 League side Cheonan City FC.
