= Lee Kyung-hwan =

South Korean footballer

Lee Kyung-Hwan
Personal information
- Full name: Lee Kyung-Hwan
- Date of birth: March 21, 1988
- Place of birth: South Korea
- Date of death: April 14, 2012 (aged 24)
- Place of death: Incheon, South Korea
- Height: 1.74 m (5 ft 9 in)
- Position: Midfielder

Youth career
- 2007–2008: Myoungsin University

Senior career*
Years	Team	Apps	(Gls)
2009–2010	Daejeon Citizen	32	(1)
2011	Suwon Bluewings	1	(0)
- * Club domestic league appearances and goals as of 25 July 2011

Lee Kyung-Hwan (March 21, 1988 – April 14, 2012) was a South Korean football player. He played for Daejeon Citizen and Suwon Bluewings.

Lee was involved in match-fixing scandal while playing for Daejeon Citizen. On the basis of the prosecution's investigation, it was confirmed in August 2011 that he would be banned from playing in the all football leagues in South Korea.

He committed suicide in Incheon on 14 April 2012, at age 24, after jumping off an apartment building. Lee was pronounced dead on the way to the hospital.
