= Kim Beom-jun =

South Korean footballer (born 1988)

Kim Beom-Jun
Personal information
- Full name: Kim Beom-Jun
- Date of birth: 14 July 1988 (age 38)
- Place of birth: South Korea
- Height: 1.84 m (6 ft 1/2 in)
- Position: Midfielder

Team information
- Current team: Pohang Steelers

Youth career
- Kyunghee University

Senior career*
Years	Team	Apps	(Gls)
2009–	Pohang Steelers	0	(0)
2011–2012	→ Sangju Sangmu (Army)	10	(0)
- * Club domestic league appearances and goals as of 4 December 2013

Kim Beom-Jun (Korean: 김범준; born 14 July 1988) is a South Korean footballer who plays as a midfielder for Pohang Steelers in the K-League.
