= Kang Min-woo (footballer, born 1987) =

Korean association football player

Personal information
- Date of birth: 26 March 1987 (age 39)
- Place of birth: Namhae, South Korea
- Height: 1.78 m (5 ft 10 in)
- Position: Defender

Youth career
- 2003–2005: Tongyeong High School
- 2006–2009: Dongguk University

Senior career*
| Years | Team | Apps | (Gls) |
| 2010 | Gangwon | 0 | (0) |
| 2011–2012 | Sangju Sangmu Phoenix | 3 | (0) |
| 2013–2014 | Vitória Setúbal | 0 | (0) |
| 2014 | Sertanense | 1 | (0) |
| 2018 | Jeonju Citizen | | |
- * Club domestic league appearances and goals

- Kang Min-woo
- Hangul: 강민우
- Hanja: 姜民右
- RR: Gang Minu
- MR: Kang Minu

Kang Min-woo (Korean: 강민우; born 26 March 1987) is a South Korean former footballer.

== Career statistics ==
=== Club ===
| Club | Season | League | | | Cup | | Other | | Total | |
| Club | Season | Division | Apps | Goals | Apps | Goals | Apps | Goals | Apps | Goals |
|---|---|---|---|---|---|---|---|---|---|---|
| Gangwon | 2010 | K-League | 0 | 0 | 0 | 0 | 0 | 0 | 0 | 0 |
| Sangju Sangmu Phoenix | 2011 | K-League | 3 | 0 | 0 | 0 | 0 | 0 | 3 | 0 |
| Sangju Sangmu Phoenix | 2012 | K-League | 0 | 0 | 0 | 0 | 0 | 0 | 0 | 0 |
| Sangju Sangmu Phoenix | Total | | 3 | 0 | 0 | 0 | 0 | 0 | 3 | 0 |
| Vitória Setúbal | 2013–14 | Primeira Liga | 0 | 0 | 0 | 0 | 0 | 0 | 0 | 0 |
| Sertanense | 2013–14 | Campeonato Nacional de Seniores | 1 | 0 | 0 | 0 | 0 | 0 | 1 | 0 |
| Jeonju Citizen | 2018 | K3 League Advanced | – | | 2 (Note: Appearances in the Korean FA Cup) | 1 | 0 | 0 | 2 | 1 |
| Career total | | | 4 | 0 | 2 | 1 | 0 | 0 | 6 | 1 |
