= Kim Min-soo (footballer, born 1984) =

South Korean footballer (born 1984)

Kim Min-Soo 김민수
Personal information
- Full name: Kim Min-Soo
- Date of birth: 14 December 1984 (age 41)
- Place of birth: South Korea
- Height: 1.78 m (5 ft 10 in)
- Position: Forward

Team information
- Current team: Gwangju FC
- Number: 7

Youth career
- 2003–2006: Hannam University

Senior career*
Years	Team	Apps	(Gls)
2007	Incheon Korail	19	(8)
2008	Daejeon Citizen	13	(1)
2009–2012	Incheon United	19	(2)
2011–2012	→ Sangju Sangmu Phoenix (army)	25	(2)
2013	Gyeongnam FC	16	(0)
2014–	Gwangju FC	19	(2)
- * Club domestic league appearances and goals as of 23 November 2014

Kim Min-Soo (Korean: 김민수; born 14 December 1984) is a South Korean football player who is currently playing for Gwangju FC.

Kim began his football career with National League side Incheon Korail in 2007, and was drafted by K-League side Daejeon Citizen ahead of the 2008 season. He was a bit-part player throughout the year making just 13 appearances, and moved to Incheon United prior to the start of the 2009 season. On 29 November 2010, he moved to Sangju Sangmu Phoenix for military duty.
