= Ko Cha-won =

South Korean footballer

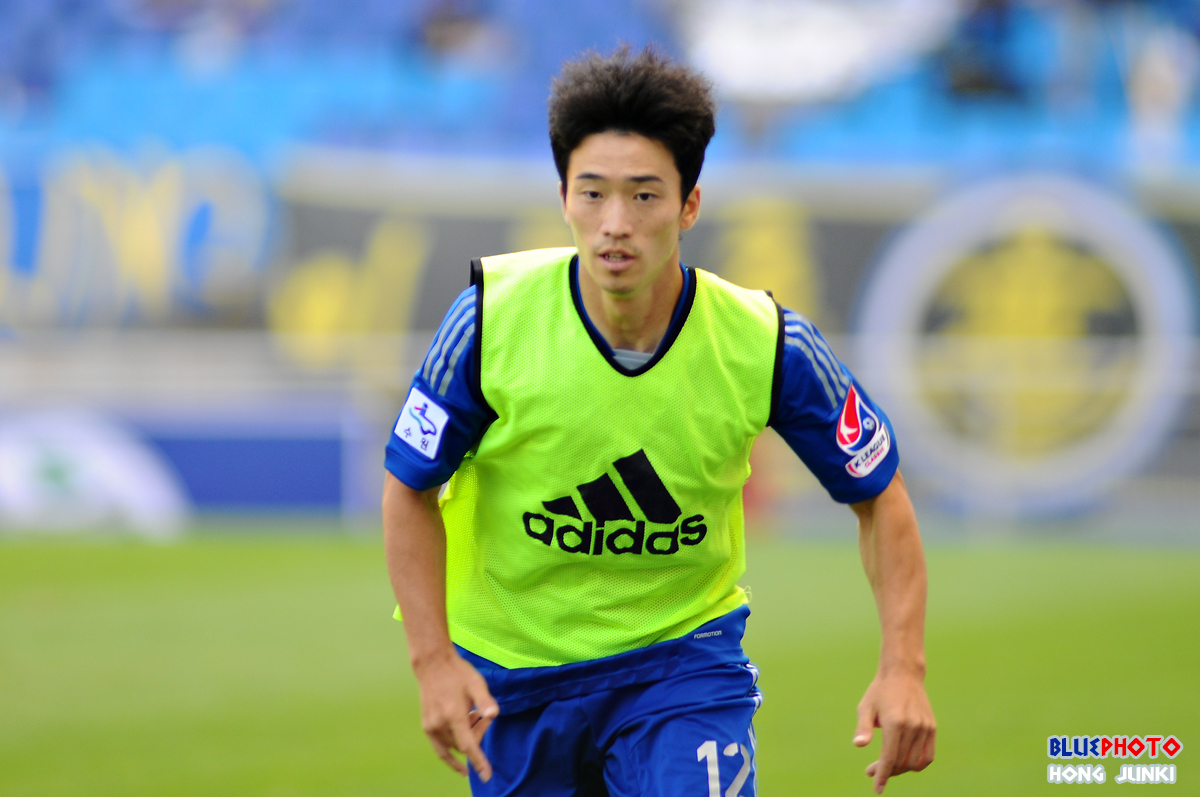

Personal information
- Full name: Ko Cha-won
- Date of birth: 30 April 1986 (age 40)
- Place of birth: Seoul, South Korea
- Height: 1.69 m (5 ft 7 in)
- Position: Midfielder

Team information
- Current team: Cheonan City

Youth career
- Ajou University

Senior career*
Years	Team	Apps	(Gls)
2009–2013	Chunnam Dragons	32	(1)
2011–2012	→ Sangju Sangmu (army)	46	(7)
2013–2017	Suwon Samsung Bluewings	64	(3)
2018	Seoul E-Land	10	(1)
2019–	Cheonan City	0	(0)
- * Club domestic league appearances and goals as of 1 January 2019

Ko Cha-won (Korean: 고차원; born 30 April 1986) is a South Korean football player who plays for Cheonan City.
