= Jang Hyun-kyu =

South Korean footballer (1981–2012)

Jang Hyun-Kyu
Personal information
- Date of birth: 22 August 1981
- Place of birth: Ulsan, South Korea
- Date of death: 16 August 2012 (aged 30)
- Place of death: Ulsan, South Korea
- Height: 1.87 m (6 ft 2 in)
- Position: Defender

Youth career
- 2000–2003: University of Ulsan

Senior career*
Years	Team	Apps	(Gls)
2004–2007	Daejeon Citizen	69	(2)
2008–2011	Pohang Steelers	23	(1)
2009–2010	→ Gwangju Sangmu (army)	47	(3)
Total		139	(6)
- * Club domestic league appearances and goals as of 16 August 2012

- Jang Hyun-kyu
- Hangul: 장현규
- Hanja: 張鉉奎
- RR: Jang Hyeongyu
- MR: Chang Hyŏn'gyu

Jang Hyun-Kyu (Korean: 장현규; 22 August 1981 – 16 August 2012) was a South Korean footballer.

He was involved in the 2011 South Korean football betting scandal.

He died of a suspected heart attack at his home in Ulsan on 16 August 2012.
