= Park Jung-sik =

South Korean football player (born 1983)

Personal information
- Date of birth: 7 March 1983 (age 43)
- Place of birth: South Korea
- Height: 1.80 m (5 ft 11 in)
- Position: Defender

Youth career
- 2002–2005: Honam University

Senior career*
Years	Team	Apps	(Gls)
2006–2011	Daegu FC	43	(1)
2010–2011	→ Sangju Sangmu (army)	0	(0)
- * Club domestic league appearances and goals as of 21 September 2011

- Park Jung-sik
- Hangul: 박정식
- Hanja: 朴正植
- RR: Bak Jeongsik
- MR: Pak Chŏngsik

Park Jung-sik (Korean: 박정식; Hanja: 朴正植; born 7 March 1983) is a South Korean football player who currently plays as defender.

== Club career ==
Park made his professional debut with Daegu FC, joining the club for the 2006 season from Honam University. Having established himself as a member of the senior men's squad (although not a regular starter), he has since joined Sangmu while he completes his military obligations.

== Career statistics ==
As of 21 September 2011

Club performance			League		Cup		League Cup		Continental		Total	
Season	Club	League	Apps	Goals	Apps	Goals	Apps	Goals	Apps	Goals	Apps	Goals
South Korea			League		KFA Cup		League Cup		Asia		Total	
2006	Daegu FC	K-League	4	0	0	0	7	0	–		11	0
2007	Daegu FC	K-League	15	1	2	0	3	0	–		20	1
2008	Daegu FC	K-League	14	0	3	0	7	0	–		24	0
2009	Daegu FC	K-League	10	0	2	0	2	0	–		14	0
2010	Sangju Sangmu	K-League	0	0	0	0	0	0	–		0	0
2011	Sangju Sangmu	K-League	0	0	0	0	0	0	–		0	0
2011	Daegu FC	K-League			0	0	0	0	–			
Career total			43	1	7	0	19	0	–		69	1
