= Cho Yong-tae =

South Korean footballer (born 1986)

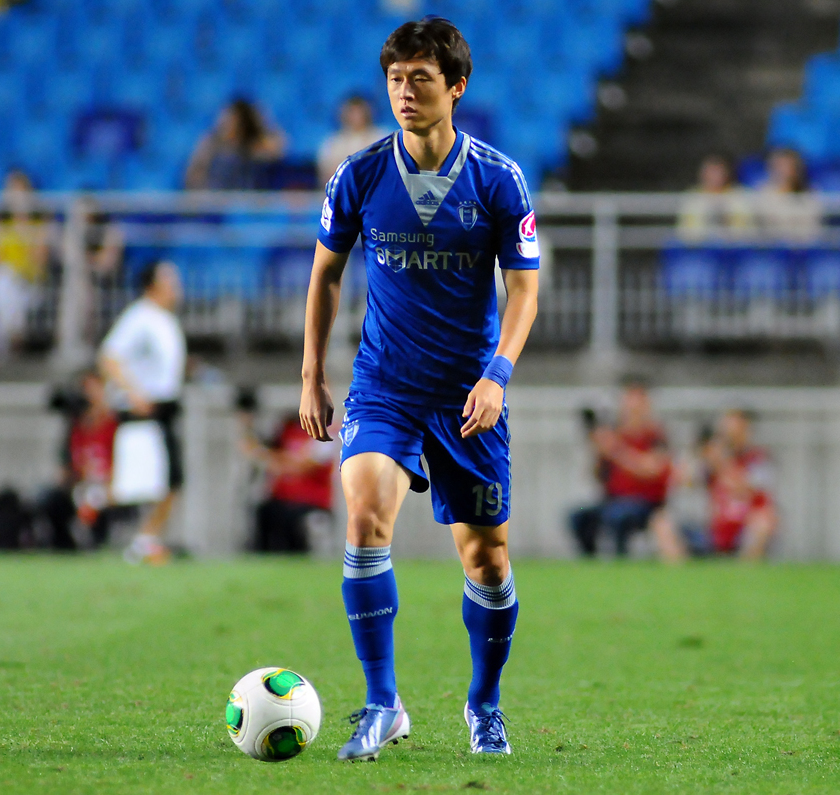

Personal information
- Date of birth: 31 March 1986 (age 40)
- Place of birth: Suncheon, South Jeolla, South Korea
- Height: 1.80 m (5 ft 11 in)
- Position: Forward

Youth career
- 2002–2004: Gwangyang Jecheol High School
- 2005–2007: Suwon Bluewings

Senior career*
Years	Team	Apps	(Gls)
2008–2013	Suwon Bluewings	48	(4)
2010–2011	→ Sangju Sangmu Phoenix (army)	20	(3)
2014	Gyeongnam FC	1	(0)
2014–2016	Gwangju FC	47	(4)
2017–2018	Seoul E-Land	15	(0)
- * Club domestic league appearances and goals as of 7 January 2019

- Cho Yong-tae
- Hangul: 조용태
- Hanja: 趙容泰
- RR: Jo Yongtae
- MR: Cho Yongt'ae

Cho Yong-tae (Korean: 조용태; born 31 March 1986) is a South Korean football player who plays as a forward.

== Club career ==
Cho first started playing football when he was nine years old. He turned down the chance to join his hometown club, Incheon United, choosing instead to sign for Suwon Bluewings in 2005, aged 19.

He spent three two years playing for Suwon's youth team before making the step-up to senior level in 2008, at the age of 21. Cho made 20 league appearances for Suwon across two seasons (2008 and 2009), scoring twice. In January 2010 he moved to Gwangju Sangmu for the two-year army service.

== Career statistics ==
- Correct as of 14 November 2011

Club performance			League		Cup		League Cup		Continental		Total	
Season	Club	League	Apps	Goals	Apps	Goals	Apps	Goals	Apps	Goals	Apps	Goals
Korea Republic			League		FA Cup		K-League Cup		Asia		Total	
2008	Suwon Bluewings	K League	11	1	0	0	6	1	—		17	2
2009	Suwon Bluewings	K League	9	1	1	0	0	0	4	0	14	1
2010	Sangju Sangmu	K League	12	2	2	1	3	1	—		17	4
2011	Sangju Sangmu	K League	8	1	1	0	4	0	—		13	1
2011	Suwon Bluewings	K League	2	0	0	0	—		0	0	2	0
Country	Korea Republic		42	5	4	1	13	2	4	0	63	8
Total			42	5	4	1	13	2	4	0	63	8
