= Seong Kyung-il =

South Korean footballer (born 1983)

Seong Kyung-Il
Personal information
- Full name: Seong Kyung-Il
- Date of birth: 1 March 1983 (age 43)
- Place of birth: South Korea
- Height: 1.87 m (6 ft 2 in)
- Position: Goalkeeper

Youth career
- Konkuk University

Senior career*
Years	Team	Apps	(Gls)
2004–2007	Jeonbuk Hyundai Motors	13	(0)
2008–2011	Gyeongnam FC	1	(0)
2009–2010	Gwangju Sangmu (army)	4	(0)

International career
- South Korea U-23
- * Club domestic league appearances and goals as of 25 July 2011

Seong Kyung-Il (Korean: 성경일; born 1 March 1983) is a South Korean football player who currently plays as goalkeeper.
