= Yoon Yeo-san =

South Korean footballer (born 1982)

Yoon Yeo-San
Personal information
- Full name: Yoon Yeo-San
- Date of birth: 9 July 1982 (age 44)
- Place of birth: South Korea
- Height: 1.85 m (6 ft 1 in)
- Position: Defender

Team information
- Current team: Tianjin Songjiang

Youth career
- Hannam University

Senior career*
Years	Team	Apps	(Gls)
2004–2005	Incheon United	0	(0)
2006–2011	Daegu FC	50	(1)
2010–2011	→ Sangju Sangmu (army)	13	(0)
2014–	Tianjin Songjiang	0	(0)
- * Club domestic league appearances and goals as of 25 July 2011

- Yoon Yeo-san
- Hangul: 윤여산
- Hanja: 尹如山
- RR: Yun Yeosan
- MR: Yun Yŏsan

Yoon Yeo-San (Korean: 윤여산; born 9 July 1982) is a South Korean footballer who currently plays as a defender.

== Club career ==
Yoon began his professional career with Incheon United, joining the club as a foundation squad member when it entered the K-League in 2004. However, in a two-year spell with the club, he made only a single appearance, in a 2005 FA Cup match.

Yoon then moved to Daegu FC. Initially, he did not play a significant on-field role, although over time he has become a regular starter, playing 26 games in total for the 2009 season. In November 2009, he moved to Sangju Sangmu while he completed his two-year military obligations.

In July 2011, he related 2011 South Korean football betting scandal.

== Career statistics ==
As of 25 July 2011

Club performance			League		Cup		League Cup		Continental		Total	
Season	Club	League	Apps	Goals	Apps	Goals	Apps	Goals	Apps	Goals	Apps	Goals
South Korea			League		KFA Cup		League Cup		Asia		Total	
2004	Incheon United	K-League	0	0	0	0	0	0	–		0	0
2005	Incheon United	K-League	0	0	1	0	0	0	–		1	0
2006	Daegu FC	K-League	5	0	1	0	6	0	–		12	0
2007	Daegu FC	K-League	15	0	1	0	3	0	–		19	0
2008	Daegu FC	K-League	10	1	2	0	3	0	–		15	1
2009	Daegu FC	K-League	20	0	2	0	4	0	–		26	0
2010	Sangju Sangmu	K-League	12	0	2	0	4	0	–		18	0
2011	Sangju Sangmu	K-League	11	0	2	0	1	0	–		14	0
Career total			73	1	11	0	21	0	–		105	1
