= Byun Woong =

South Korean footballer

Personal information
- Full name: Byun Woong
- Date of birth: 7 May 1986 (age 40)
- Place of birth: South Korea
- Height: 1.75 m (5 ft 9 in)
- Position: Midfielder

Team information
- Current team: Ulsan Hyundai Mipo
- Number: 16

Youth career
- University of Ulsan

Senior career*
| Years | Team | Apps | (Gls) |
| 2009–2013 | Ulsan Hyundai | 0 | (0) |
| 2010–2011 | → Sangju Sangmu (army) | 15 | (0) |
| 2012 | → Ulsan Hyundai Mipo (loan) | 9 | (1) |
| 2014–2015 | Chungju Hummel | 16 | (1) |
| 2016–2017? | Ulsan Hyundai Mipo (loan) | 0 | (0) |
- * Club domestic league appearances and goals as of 1 January 2013

Byun Woong (Korean: 변웅; born 7 May 1986) is a South Korean footballer who played as a midfielder for Chungju Hummel.
