= Choi Won-kwon =

South Korean footballer (born 1982)

Choi Won-kwon 최원권
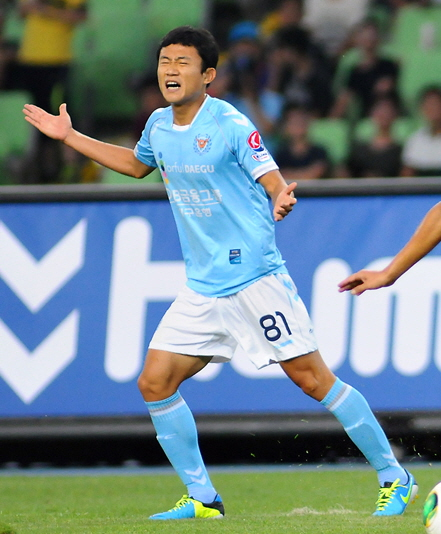
- Choi Won-Kwon, playing for Daegu FC in 2013

Personal information
- Full name: Choi Won-kwon
- Date of birth: 8 November 1982 (age 43)
- Place of birth: Seoul, South Korea
- Height: 1.76 m (5 ft 9 1/2 in)
- Positions: Right back; midfielder

Senior career*
| Years | Team | Apps | (Gls) |
| 2000–2010 | Anyang LG Cheetahs / FC Seoul | 124 | (3) |
| 2009–2010 | → Gwangju Sangmu (Military service) | 46 | (8) |
| 2011–2013 | Jeju United | 44 | (0) |
| 2013 | → Daegu (loan) | 12 | (0) |
| 2014 | Gyeongju KH&NP | 3 | (0) |
| 2014–2016 | Daegu FC | 17 | (1) |

International career
| 2003–2004 | South Korea U-23 | 27 | (0) |
| 2003–2004 | South Korea | 4 | (0) |

Managerial career
- 2022–2024: Daegu
- 2024–2025: Vietnam (assistant)
- 2025: Dong A Thanh Hoa
- * Club domestic league appearances and goals as of 10 July 2025

- Choi Won-kwon
- Hangul: 최원권
- Hanja: 崔源權
- RR: Choe Wongwon
- MR: Ch'oe Wŏn'gwŏn

Choi Won-kwon (Korean: 최원권; Hanja: 崔源權; born 8 November 1982) is a South Korean former football player.

== Playing career ==
=== Club ===
He was played for FC Seoul, Jeju United, Daegu FC

=== International ===
He was part of the South Korea U-23 team in the 2004 Summer Olympics that finished second in Group A, making it through to the next round before being defeated by the eventual silver medalists, Paraguay.

== Coaching career ==
After his retirement, Choi became a manager. He was appointed as the head coach of his former team Daegu in 2022 and remained there until 2024. He then worked as assistant coach for Kim Sang-sik at the Vietnam national team. On 14 July 2025, he was appointed as the head coach of V.League 1 club Dong A Thanh Hoa.

== Career statistics ==
=== Club ===
As of 31 December 2013

※ Checking 7 matches in 2001–02 Asian Club Championship now.

| Club performance | | | League | | Cup | | League Cup | | Continental | | Total | |
| Season | Club | League | Apps | Goals | Apps | Goals | Apps | Goals | Apps | Goals | Apps | Goals |
| South Korea | | | League | | KFA Cup | | League Cup | | Asia | | Total | |
|---|---|---|---|---|---|---|---|---|---|---|---|---|
| 2000 | Anyang LG Cheetahs | K-League | 1 | 0 | 0 | 0 | 3 | 0 | 0 | 0 | | |
| 2001 | Anyang LG Cheetahs | K-League | 14 | 0 | 1 | 0 | 8 | 0 | ? | 0 | 4+? | 0 |
| 2002 | Anyang LG Cheetahs | K-League | 11 | 0 | 1 | 0 | 9 | 0 | ? | 0 | 21+? | 0 |
| 2003 | Anyang LG Cheetahs | K-League | 25 | 2 | 1 | 0 | - | | - | | 26 | 2 |
| 2004 | FC Seoul | K-League | 19 | 1 | 2 | 0 | 0 | 0 | - | | 21 | 1 |
| 2005 | FC Seoul | K-League | 5 | 0 | 0 | 0 | 6 | 0 | - | | 11 | 0 |
| 2006 | FC Seoul | K-League | 13 | 0 | 0 | 0 | 1 | 0 | - | | 14 | 0 |
| 2007 | FC Seoul | K-League | 23 | 0 | 3 | 0 | 10 | 0 | - | | 36 | 0 |
| 2008 | FC Seoul | K-League | 13 | 0 | 0 | 0 | 7 | 0 | - | | 20 | 0 |
| 2009 | Gwangju Sangmu | K-League | 26 | 5 | 1 | 0 | 0 | 0 | - | | 27 | 5 |
| 2010 | Gwangju Sangmu | K-League | 20 | 3 | 2 | 1 | 4 | 0 | - | | 26 | 4 |
| 2011 | Jeju United | K-League | 15 | 0 | 1 | 0 | 0 | 0 | 3 | 0 | 19 | 0 |
| 2012 | Jeju United | K-League | 27 | 0 | 2 | 0 | - | | - | | 29 | 0 |
| 2013 | Jeju United | K League Classic | 2 | 0 | 0 | 0 | - | | - | | 2 | 0 |
| 2014 | Daegu FC | K League Classic | 12 | 0 | 0 | 0 | - | | - | | 12 | 0 |
| Career total | | | 226 | 11 | 14 | 11 | 48 | 0 | 3+? | 0 | 291+? | 12 |

=== International ===
Appearances and goals by national team and year
| National team | Year | Apps | Goals |
|---|---|---|---|
| South Korea | 2003 | 3 | 0 |
| South Korea | 2004 | 1 | 0 |
| Total | | 4 | 0 |

=== Managerial ===
Managerial record by team and tenure
| Team | From | To | Record | | | | |
| Team | From | To | P | W | D | L | Win % |
|---|---|---|---|---|---|---|---|
| Daegu (Caretaker) | 15 August 2022 | 7 November 2022 | 13 | 5 | 4 | 4 | 38.5 |
| Daegu | 7 November 2022 | 19 April 2024 | 48 | 15 | 17 | 16 | 31.3 |
| Dong A Thanh Hoa | 10 July 2025 | 15 November 2025 | 11 | 1 | 5 | 5 | 9.1 |
| Total | | | 72 | 21 | 26 | 25 | 29.2 |

== See also ==
- South Korea national football team

Sporting positions
| Preceded by Park Jong-Jin | Gwangju Sangmu FC captain 2010 | Succeeded by Kim Jung-Woo |
| Preceded by Kim Eun-Jung | Jeju United captain 2012 | Succeeded by Oh Seung-Bum |
