= Park Sang-cheol =

South Korean footballer

Park Sang-Cheol
Personal information
- Full name: Park Sang-Cheol
- Date of birth: February 3, 1984 (age 42)
- Place of birth: South Korea
- Height: 1.86 m (6 ft 1 in)
- Position: Goalkeeper

Senior career*
Years	Team	Apps	(Gls)
2004–2007	Seongnam Ilhwa Chunma	8	(0)
2008–2011	Chunnam Dragons	18	(0)
2011	→ Sangju Sangmu Phoenix (military service)	0	(0)
- * Club domestic league appearances and goals as of 14 July 2011

Park Sang-Cheol (Korean: 박상철; born February 3, 1984) is a South Korean football player. He previous played for Seongnam Ilhwa Chunma, Chunnam Dragons and Sangju Sangmu Phoenix.

He was arrested on the charge connected with the match fixing allegations on 7 July 2011.
