= Jung Kyung-ho (footballer, born 1987) =

South Korean footballer

Personal information
- Full name: Jung Kyung-ho
- Date of birth: January 12, 1987 (age 39)
- Place of birth: Chilgok, Gyeongbuk, South Korea
- Height: 1.68 m (5 ft 6 in)
- Position: Midfielder

Team information
- Current team: Ansan Greeners
- Number: 18

Senior career*
Years	Team	Apps	(Gls)
2006–2008	Gyeongnam FC	39	(1)
2009–2011	Chunnam Dragons	6	(1)
2010–2011	→ Sangju Sangmu (army)	31	(0)
2012	Jeju United	5	(0)
2013	Gwangju FC	17	(0)
2014–2016	Ulsan Hyundai Mipo Dolphin	71	(3)
2017–	Ansan Greeners	23	(3)

International career
2006–2007	South Korea U20	13	(0)
- * Club domestic league appearances and goals as of 7 January 2018

Jung Kyung-ho (Korean: 정경호; born 12 January 1987) is a South Korean footballer who plays for Ansan Greeners.

He was a member of South Korea U20 team at the 2007 FIFA U-20 World Cup.

== Club career statistics ==
Club performance			League		Cup		League Cup		Continental		Total	
Season	Club	League	Apps	Goals	Apps	Goals	Apps	Goals	Apps	Goals	Apps	Goals
Korea Republic			League		FA Cup		K-League Cup		Asia		Total	
2006	Gyeongnam FC	K League	18	1	0	0	5	0	—		23	1
2007	Gyeongnam FC	K League	21	0	1	0	9	0	—		31	0
2008	Chunnam Dragons	K League	0	0	0	0	0	0	0	0	0	0
2009	Chunnam Dragons	K League	6	1	0	0	3	0	—		9	1
2010	Sangju Sangmu	K League	22	0	1	0	3	0	—		25	0
2011	Sangju Sangmu	K League	9	0	1	0	2	0	—		12	0
2011	Chunnam Dragons	K League			0	0	0	0	—			
Country	Korea Republic		76	2	3	0	22	0	0	0	101	2
Total			76	2	3	0	22	0	0	0	101	2
