= Baek Seung-min =

South Korean footballer

Baek Seung-Min
Personal information
- Date of birth: March 12, 1986 (age 40)
- Place of birth: Seoul, South Korea
- Height: 1.72 m (5 ft 8 in)
- Position: Midfielder

Youth career
- 2005: Yonsei University

Senior career*
Years	Team	Apps	(Gls)
2006–2011	Jeonnam Dragons	60	(3)

International career
2003	South Korea U-17		
2003–2005	South Korea U-20	31	(1)
2007	South Korea U-23	4	(0)
- * Club domestic league appearances and goals as of 1 July 2011

Baek Seung-Min (born March 12, 1986) is a South Korean football player.

Baek has played for the South Korea national football team in the 2003 FIFA U-17 World Championship and 2005 FIFA World Youth Championship.

He was permanently released from domestic football league system for his involvement in a match-fixing scandal during 2010 season.

== Club career statistics ==
Club performance			League		Cup		League Cup		Continental		Total	
Season	Club	League	Apps	Goals	Apps	Goals	Apps	Goals	Apps	Goals	Apps	Goals
South Korea			League		KFA Cup		League Cup		Asia		Total	
2006	Chunnam Dragons	K-League	9	0	2	1	9	0	-		20	1
2007	Chunnam Dragons	K-League	15	0	4	0	1	0	?	?		
2008	Chunnam Dragons	K-League	14	0	1	0	3	0	2	0	20	0
2009	Chunnam Dragons	K-League							-			
Total	South Korea		38	0	7	1	13	0				
Career total			38	0	7	1	13	0				
