= Kim Min-o =

South Korean footballer (born 1983)

Kim Min-O
Personal information
- Full name: Kim Min-O (김민오)
- Date of birth: May 8, 1983 (age 43)
- Place of birth: South Korea
- Height: 1.83 m (6 ft 0 in)
- Position: Defensive midfielder

Youth career
- Ulsan University

Senior career*
Years	Team	Apps	(Gls)
2006–2011	Ulsan Hyundai	45	(0)
2010–2011	→ Sangju Sangmu (army)	13	(0)
2012–2015	Yongin City		
- * Club domestic league appearances and goals as of 30 September 2011

Kim Min-O (born May 8, 1983) is a South Korean football player.
