= Park Won-hong =

South Korean footballer

Park Won-Hong
Personal information
- Full name: Park Won-Hong (박원홍)
- Date of birth: April 7, 1984 (age 42)
- Place of birth: Ulsan, South Korea
- Height: 1.75 m (5 ft 9 in)
- Position: Midfielder

Senior career*
Years	Team	Apps	(Gls)
2005–2011	Ulsan Hyundai	21	(3)
2009–2010	→ Gwangju Sangmu (army)	11	(1)
2011–2012	Persipura Jayapura	8	(0)
2012–2013	Incheon Korail	12	(0)
- * Club domestic league appearances and goals

Park Won-Hong (Korean: 박원홍; born April 7, 1984) is a South Korean former football player.

== Club career ==
Park joined Ulsan Hyundai in 2006. In 2008, he moved to Gwangju Sangmu, the military's football club, to fulfill his military obligations. On 12 September 2010, late in the second half of a match against Incheon United, he scored his first professional goal ensuring a 1 - 1 draw. Following the completion of his military service, Park briefly returned to Ulsan Hyundai but then moved offshore to Indonesia to continue his professional football career.
