= Kim Dong-hyun (footballer, born 1984) =

South Korean footballer

Personal information
- Date of birth: 20 May 1984 (age 42)
- Place of birth: Busan, South Korea
- Height: 1.88 m (6 ft 2 in)
- Position: Forward

College career
Years	Team	Apps	(Gls)
- Hanyang University

Senior career*
Years	Team	Apps	(Gls)
2003	Oita Trinita	1	(0)
2004–2005	Suwon Samsung Bluewings	41	(7)
2005–2006	Braga	13	(1)
2006	→ Rubin Kazan (loan)	4	(1)
2007–2008	Seongnam Ilhwa Chunma	46	(6)
2009–2011	Gyeongnam FC	12	(1)
2010–2011	→ Sangju Sangmu Phoenix (draft)	22	(3)
Total		139	(19)

International career
2002–2003	South Korea U20	23 (Note: Includes one appearance and one goal against another KFA team.)	(10)
2003–2006	South Korea U23	13 (Note: Includes one appearance against non-national team.)	(3)
2004–2006	South Korea	6	(1)
Medal record
Representing South Korea
Men's football
AFC Youth Championship
Winner	2002 Qatar
- * Club domestic league appearances and goals

- Kim Dong-hyun
- Hangul: 김동현
- Hanja: 金洞眩
- RR: Gim Donghyeon
- MR: Kim Tonghyŏn

Kim Dong-hyun (born 20 May 1984) is a former South Korean footballer. He was banned from all football-related activities because of his involvement in match fixing.

== Playing career ==
Nicknamed the "Korean Vieri", Kim was expected to became a main member of the next generation at the South Korea national team after leading the national under-20 team to the AFC Youth Championship title in 2002. He had dropped out of university to join J1 League club Oita Trinita in 2003, but was not regarded as a regular at the club. He joined K League club Suwon Samsung Bluewings after being released from Oita in 2004. He had 10 goals and 6 assists in 55 matches for two years, helping Suwon win a K League title and a Korean League Cup title. He received an offer from Primeira Liga club Braga in December 2005. He made 13 appearances at 2005–06 Primeira Liga and scored a goal against Rio Ave. His performance dissatisfied Braga, and he returned to K League the next year after being on loan to Russian club Rubin Kazan for half a year. He played at Seongnam Ilhwa Chunma for two years, but continuously did not make an impression. Released by Seongnam, he moved to Gyeongnam FC in 2009 and enlisted in military team Sangju Sangmu Phoenix the next year.

On 1 June 2011, Kim was arrested on charges of accepting bribes from brokers and attempting to fix their games in the middle of his mandatory military service at Sangmu. He was in the center of the 2011 South Korean football match-fixing scandal, introducing brokers to other players. On 17 June 2011, his activity as a footballer was banned by the K League Federation.

== Personal life ==
On 25 May 2012, Kim and former baseball player Yun Chan-soo kidnapped a woman and stole her car. On 17 January 2013, Kim was sentenced to three years in prison.

== Career statistics ==
=== Club ===
Appearances and goals by club, season and competition
Club	Season	League			National cup		League cup		Continental		Total	
Club	Season	Division	Apps	Goals	Apps	Goals	Apps	Goals	Apps	Goals	Apps	Goals
Oita Trinita	2003	J1 League	1	0	0	0	0	0	—		1	0
Suwon Samsung Bluewings	2004	K League	24	3	0	0	2	1	—		26	4
Suwon Samsung Bluewings	2005	K League	17	4	3	0	12	2	6	1	38	7
Suwon Samsung Bluewings	Total		41	7	3	0	14	3	6	1	64	11
Braga	2005–06	Primeira Liga	13	1	1	0	—		0	0	14	1
Rubin Kazan (loan)	2006	Russian Premier League	4	1	0	0	—		2	0	6	1
Seongnam Ilhwa Chunma	2007	K League	25	5	1	0	1	0	10	5	37	10
Seongnam Ilhwa Chunma	2008	K League	21	1	3	0	9	3	—		33	4
Seongnam Ilhwa Chunma	Total		46	6	4	0	10	3	10	5	70	14
Gyeongnam FC	2009	K League	12	1	0	0	3	0	—		15	1
Sangju Sangmu Phoenix (draft)	2010	K League	16	3	3	1	3	0	—		22	4
Sangju Sangmu Phoenix (draft)	2011	K League	6	0	1	0	4	2	—		11	2
Sangju Sangmu Phoenix (draft)	Total		22	3	4	1	7	2	—		33	6
Career total			139	19	12	1	34	8	18	6	203	34

=== International ===
Appearances and goals by national team and year
National team	Year	Apps	Goals
South Korea	2004	1	0
South Korea	2005	3	0
South Korea	2006	2	1
Career total		6	1

Results list South Korea's goal tally first.

List of international goals scored by Kim Dong-hyun
No.	Date	Venue	Opponent	Score	Result	Competition
1	8 October 2006	Seoul, South Korea	Ghana	1–2	1–3	Friendly

== Honours ==
Suwon Samsung Bluewings

- K League 1: 2004
- Korean League Cup: 2005
- Korean Super Cup: 2005
- A3 Champions Cup: 2005

South Korea U20

- AFC Youth Championship: 2002

Individual

- AFC Youth Championship Most Valuable Player: 2002
