= Kim Tae-min =

South Korean footballer (born 1982)

Kim Tae-Min
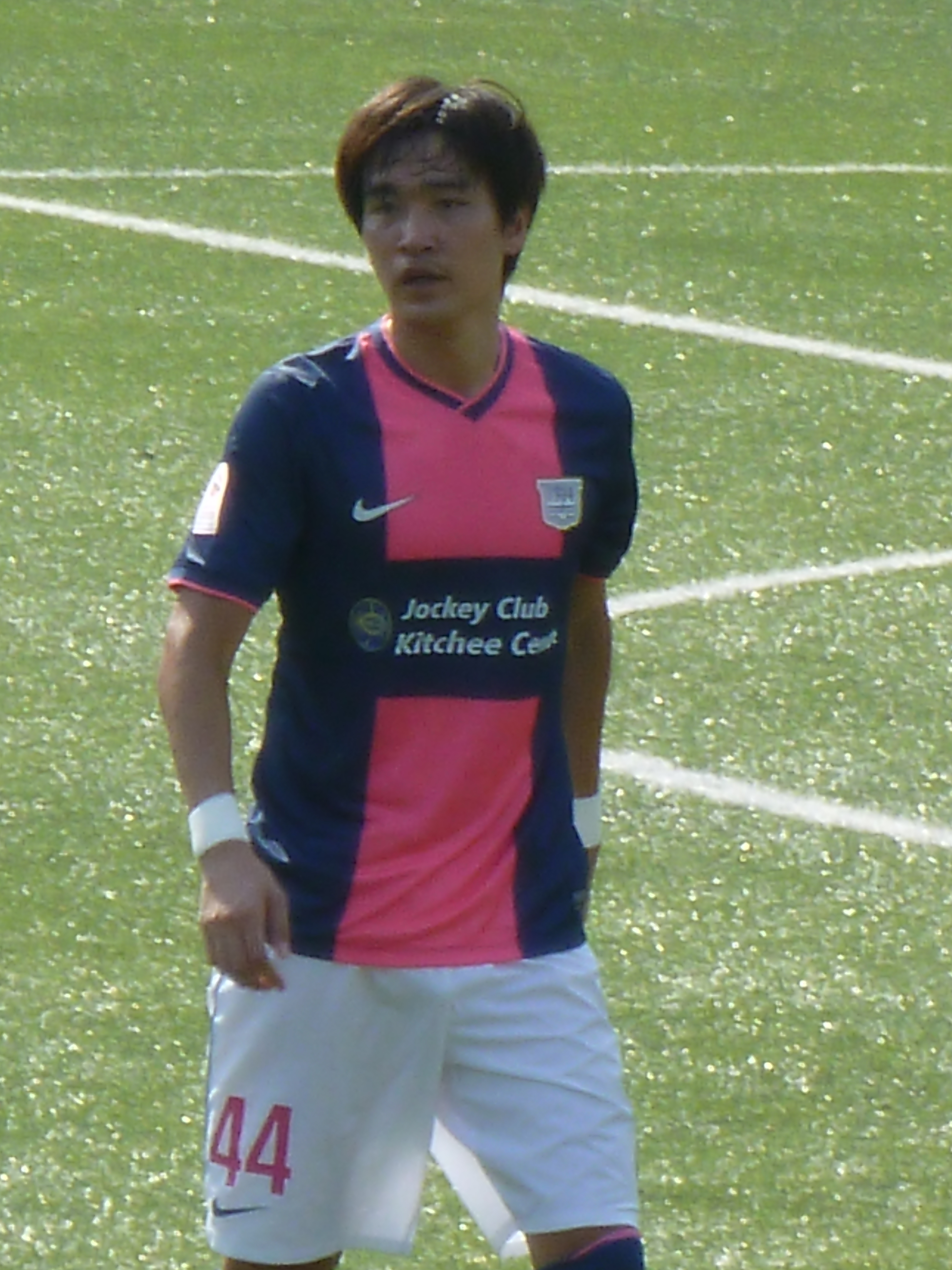

Personal information
- Full name: Kim Tae-Min
- Date of birth: 25 May 1982 (age 44)
- Place of birth: South Korea
- Height: 1.85 m (6 ft 1 in)
- Positions: Midfielder; defender

Team information
- Current team: Suwon FC (head coach)

Senior career*
Years	Team	Apps	(Gls)
2001–2007	Busan I'Park	95	(2)
2008–2011	Jeju United	15	(0)
2009–2010	→ Gwangju Sangmu (army)	28	(0)
2012	Gangwon FC	26	(0)
2013	Chongqing F.C.	28	(1)
2014	Police United	20	(1)
2014–2016	Kitchee	19	(0)

International career
2003–2004	South Korea U-23	5	(0)
- * Club domestic league appearances and goals as of 31 May 2016

Kim Tae-Min (Korean: 김태민; born 25 May 1982) is a South Korean football coach and former player, He currently head coach of K League 2 club Suwon FC.

== Summary ==
Kim was known as the fastest Korean player He was the symbol of the 'Diligence' in K-league based on his experience. He played for Gangwon F.C. which valued his experience and diligence highly and they considered him to be the replacement for Lee Eul-Yong, the legend player of South Korea National Team . He is a defensive midfielder.

Kim transferred to China League One side Chongqing F.C. in February 2013.

== Career statistics ==
As of 31 October 2011

Club performance			League		Cup		League Cup		Continental		Total	
Season	Club	League	Apps	Goals	Apps	Goals	Apps	Goals	Apps	Goals	Apps	Goals
Korea Republic			League		FA Cup		K-League Cup		Asia		Total	
2001	Busan I'cons / Busan I'Park	K-League	0	0		0	0	0	-			0
2002	Busan I'cons / Busan I'Park	K-League	0	0		0	0	0	-			0
2003	Busan I'cons / Busan I'Park	K-League	35	1	1	0	-		-		36	1
2004	Busan I'cons / Busan I'Park	K-League	19	0	5	0	9	1	-		33	1
2005	Busan I'cons / Busan I'Park	K-League	16	1	0	0	11	1		1		3
2006	Busan I'cons / Busan I'Park	K-League	13	0	1	0	7	0	-		21	0
2007	Busan I'cons / Busan I'Park	K-League	12	0	2	0	8	0	-		22	0
2008	Jeju United	K-League	12	0	0	0	4	0	-		16	0
2009	Gwangju Sangmu	K-League	16	0	2	0	4	2	-		22	2
2010	Gwangju Sangmu	K-League	12	0	1	0	0	0	-		13	0
2010	Jeju United	K-League	0	0	0	0	0	0	-		0	0
2011	Jeju United	K-League	3	0	0	0	1	0	3	0	7	0
2012	Gangwon FC	K-League					-		-			
Total			138	2			44	4				
