= Yoon Shin-young =

South Korean footballer

Yoon Shin-Young

Personal information
- Full name: Yoon Shin-Young
- Date of birth: 22 May 1987 (age 39)
- Place of birth: South Korea
- Height: 1.83 m (6 ft 0 in)
- Position: Defender

Youth career
- 2006–2008: Kyonggi University

Senior career*
Years	Team	Apps	(Gls)
2009–2011	Daejeon Citizen	4	(0)
2010–2011	→ Sangju Sangmu (army)	13	(0)
2012–2013	Gyeongnam FC	63	(2)
2014	Jiangsu Sainty	14	(0)
2015	Daejeon Citizen	15	(0)
2016	Renofa Yamaguchi	27	(0)
2017–2020	Daejeon Citizen	59	(0)
2020	Bucheon FC 1995	6	(0)
Total		201	(2)

International career
2008	Korea Republic Beach Soccer		
- * Club domestic league appearances and goals as of 19 September 2020

Yoon Shin-Young (Korean: 윤신영; born 22 May 1987) is a South Korean former football player who plays as a defender.

== Club career ==
Yoon was selected by Daejeon Citizen as a draft player for the 2009 K-League season. After the season was completed, he moved to Sangju Sangmu Phoenix (formerly Gwangju Sangmu FC), the sports division of the Military of South Korea, in order to fulfill his compulsory two-year military service. Yoon had limited appearances for his new club during the 2010 K-League season, but saw more regular game time in 2011.

Having completed his two-year stint with Sangju, Yoon returned to Daejeon on 21 September 2011. After the 2011 campaign, Yoon left Daejeon as a free agent and joined Gyeongnam FC in January 2012.

On 7 February 2014, Yoon transferred to Chinese Super League side Jiangsu Sainty.

On 20 January 2015, Yoon transferred to K-League side Daejeon Citizen.

On 1 February 2016, Yoon transferred to J2 League side Renofa Yamaguchi FC.

== Club career statistics ==
As of 19 September 2020

Appearances and goals by club, season and competition
Club	Season	League			Cup		League Cup		Other		Total	
Club	Season	Division	Apps	Goals	Apps	Goals	Apps	Goals	Apps	Goals	Apps	Goals
Daejeon Citizen	2009	K-League	4	0	0	0	2	0	—		6	0
Daejeon Citizen	2011	K-League	0	0	0	0	0	0	—		0	0
Daejeon Citizen	Total		4	0	0	0	2	0	—		6	2
Sangju Sangmu (army)	2010	K-League	0	0	0	0	2	0	—		2	0
Sangju Sangmu (army)	2011	K-League	13	0	1	0	4	0	—		18	0
Sangju Sangmu (army)	Total		13	0	1	0	6	0	—		20	0
Gyeongnam FC	2012	K-League	31	0	4	0	—		—		35	0
Gyeongnam FC	2013	K League Classic	32	2	0	0	—		—		32	2
Gyeongnam FC	Total		63	2	4	0	—		—		67	2
Jiangsu Sainty	2014	Chinese Super League	14	0	3	0	—		—		17	0
Daejeon Hana Citizen	2015	K League Classic	15	0	1	0	—		—		16	0
Renofa Yamaguchi	2016	J2 League	27	0	1	0	—		—		28	0
Daejeon Hana Citizen	2017	K League Challenge	21	0	0	0	—		—		21	0
Daejeon Hana Citizen	2018	K League 2	16	0	1	0	—		1	0	18	0
Daejeon Hana Citizen	2019	K League 2	22	0	0	0	—		—		22	0
Daejeon Hana Citizen	Total		59	0	1	0	—		1	0	61	0
Bucheon FC 1995	2020	K League 2	6	0	0	0	—		—		6	0
Career total			201	2	11	0	8	0	1	0	221	2
