= Kwak Chul-ho =

South Korean footballer (born 1986)

Kwak Chul-Ho
Personal information
- Full name: Kwak Chul-Ho (곽철호)
- Date of birth: May 8, 1986 (age 40)
- Place of birth: South Korea
- Height: 1.86 m (6 ft 1 in)
- Position: Forward

Team information
- Current team: Daejeon Korail
- Number: 20

Senior career*
Years	Team	Apps	(Gls)
2008–2011	Daejeon Citizen	14	(0)
2010–2011	→ Sangju Sangmu (army)	8	(0)
2012–2015	Changwon City	92	(37)
2016–	Daejeon Korail		
- * Club domestic league appearances and goals as of 1 January 2014

Kwak Chul-Ho (born May 8, 1986) is a South Korean football player who currently plays for Daejeon Korail in the Korea National League. He formerly played for Daejeon Citizen in the K-League.
