= Park Byung-gyu =

South Korean footballer

Personal information
- Date of birth: March 1, 1982 (age 44)
- Place of birth: South Korea
- Height: 1.78 m (5 ft 10 in)
- Position: Defender

Youth career
- 1998–2000: Bupyeong High School
- 2001–2004: Korea University

Senior career*
Years	Team	Apps	(Gls)
2005–2011	Ulsan Hyundai	91	(0)
2009–2010	→ Gwangju Sangmu (army)	31	(0)
- * Club domestic league appearances and goals as of 25 July 2011

- Park Byung-gyu
- Hangul: 박병규
- Hanja: 朴炳圭
- RR: Bak Byeonggyu
- MR: Pak Pyŏnggyu

Park Byung-gyu (born March 1, 1982) is a South Korean football player. He played for Ulsan Hyundai FC and Gwangju Sangmu FC previously.
