= Lee Soo-chul =

South Korean footballer (1966–2011)

Lee Soo-Chul
Personal information
- Full name: Lee Soo-Chul
- Date of birth: May 20, 1966
- Place of birth: South Korea
- Date of death: October 18, 2011 (aged 45)
- Position: Forward

Senior career*
Years	Team	Apps	(Gls)
1989–1995	Ulsan Hyundai FC	91	(9)

Managerial career
- 1996–2002: Sangmu FC (Coach)
- 2003–2010: Gwangju Sangmu FC (Coach)
- 2010–2011: Sangju Sangmu Phoenix
- * Club domestic league appearances and goals as of 17 July 2011 ‡ National team caps and goals as of 15 November 2007

- Lee Soo-chul
- Hangul: 이수철
- Hanja: 李壽澈
- RR: I Sucheol
- MR: I Such'ŏl

Lee Soo-Chul (Korean: 이수철; Hanja: 李壽澈; May 20, 1966 – October 18, 2011) was a South Korean footballer and football manager.

He played for Ulsan Hyundai FC as a forward, and was manager of Sangju Sangmu Phoenix at the time of his death.

Lee was found dead on October 18, 2011, in an apparent suicide. He was 45.
