= Hwang Ji-yoon =

South Korean footballer

Personal information
- Date of birth: May 28, 1983 (age 43)
- Place of birth: South Korea
- Height: 1.82 m (6 ft 0 in)
- Position: Defender

Youth career
- 1999–2001: Geoje High School
- 2003–2004: Ajou University

Senior career*
Years	Team	Apps	(Gls)
2005–2007	Bucheon SK / Jeju United	30	(2)
2008	Daegu FC	24	(2)
2009–2011	Daejeon Citizen	44	(2)
2011	→ Sangju Sangmu (army)	1	(0)
- * Club domestic league appearances and goals as of 25 July 2011

- Hwang Ji-yoon
- Hangul: 황지윤
- Hanja: 黃智允
- RR: Hwang Jiyun
- MR: Hwang Chiyun

Hwang Ji-yoon (born May 28, 1983) is a South Korean footballer. He previously played for Jeju United FC, Bucheon SK, Daegu FC, Daejeon Citizen and Sangju Sangmu.

Sporting positions
Preceded by Choi Eun-sung	Daejeon Citizen captain 2010	Succeeded by Park Sung-ho
