= Seo Min-gook =

South Korean footballer (born 1983)

Seo Min-Gook
Personal information
- Full name: Seo Min-Gook (서민국)
- Date of birth: November 23, 1983 (age 42)
- Place of birth: South Korea
- Height: 1.74 m (5 ft 9 in)
- Position: Midfielder

Senior career*
| Years | Team | Apps | (Gls) |
| 2006–2010 | Incheon United | 17 | (0) |
| 2009–2010 | → Gwangju Sangmu (army) | 23 | (0) |
| 2011 | Busan Transportation Corp. | 8 | (0) |
- * Club domestic league appearances and goals

Seo Min-Gook (born November 23, 1983) is a South Korean football player.
