= Kim Jee-hyuk =

South Korean footballer (born 1981)

Kim Jee-Hyuk 김지혁
Personal information
- Full name: Kim Jee-Hyuk
- Date of birth: October 26, 1981 (age 44)
- Place of birth: Busan, South Korea
- Height: 1.87 m (6 ft 1 1/2 in)
- Position: Goalkeeper

Senior career*
Years	Team	Apps	(Gls)
2001–2004	Busan I'cons	3	(0)
2005–2007	Ulsan Hyundai Horang-i	26	(0)
2008–2011	Pohang Steelers	28	(0)
2010–2011	→ Sangju Sangmu (army)	37	(0)

International career^{‡}
2003–2004	South Korea U-23	7	(0)
- * Club domestic league appearances and goals as of 19 December 2009 ‡ National team caps and goals as of 31 December 2004

- Kim Jee-hyuk
- Hangul: 김지혁
- Hanja: 金志赫
- RR: Gim Jihyeok
- MR: Kim Chihyŏk

Kim Jee-Hyuk (born October 26, 1981) is a South Korean football player who, as of 2010 is playing for Gwangju Sangmu.

He was part of the South Korea football team in 2004 Summer Olympics, who finished second in Group A, making it through to the next round, before being defeated by silver medal winners Paraguay.

He was arrested on the charge connected with the match fixing allegations on 7 July 2011.

== Club career statistics ==
Club performance			League		Cup		League Cup		Continental		Total	
Season	Club	League	Apps	Goals	Apps	Goals	Apps	Goals	Apps	Goals	Apps	Goals
South Korea			League		KFA Cup		League Cup		Asia		Total	
2001	Busan I'cons	K-League	3	0			0	0	-			
2002	Busan I'cons	K-League	0	0			0	0	-			
2003	Busan I'cons	K-League	0	0	0	0	-		-		0	0
2004	Busan I'cons	K-League	0	0	0	0	2	0				
2005	Ulsan Hyundai Horang-i	K-League	4	0	2	0	0	0	-		6	0
2006	Ulsan Hyundai Horang-i	K-League	19	0	1	0	10	0				
2007	Ulsan Hyundai Horang-i	K-League	3	0	0	0	2	0	-		5	0
2008	Pohang Steelers	K-League	19	0	3	0	2	0	0	0	24	0
2009	Pohang Steelers	K-League	9	0	2	0	1	0	0	0	12	0
2010	Gwangju Sangmu / Sangju Sangmu	K-League	26	0	3	0	0	0	-		29	0
2011	Gwangju Sangmu / Sangju Sangmu	K-League	11	0	1	0	0	0	-		12	0
Total	South Korea		94	0			17	0				
Career total			94	0			17	0				
