= Ju Kwang-youn =

South Korean footballer

Ju Kwang-Youn
Personal information
- Date of birth: October 23, 1982 (age 44)
- Place of birth: South Korea
- Height: 1.77 m (5 ft 10 in)
- Position: Forward

Youth career
- Korea University

Senior career*
Years	Team	Apps	(Gls)
2003–2011	Chunnam Dragons	100	(6)
2010–2011	→ Sangju Sangmu Phoenix (army)	18	(0)

International career
2000	South Korea U-20		
- * Club domestic league appearances and goals as of 14 July 2011

Ju Kwang-Youn (born May 13, 1985) is a South Korean footballer. He previous played for Chunnam Dragons and Sangju Sangmu Phoenix.

He was arrested on the charge connected with the match fixing allegations on 7 July 2011.

== Club career statistics ==
Club performance			League		Cup		League Cup		Continental		Total	
Season	Club	League	Apps	Goals	Apps	Goals	Apps	Goals	Apps	Goals	Apps	Goals
South Korea			League		KFA Cup		League Cup		Asia		Total	
2003	Chunnam Dragons	K-League	13	1	2	0	-		-		15	1
2004	Chunnam Dragons	K-League	6	0	3	1	1	0	-		10	1
2005	Chunnam Dragons	K-League	15	1	3	0	0	0	-		18	1
2006	Chunnam Dragons	K-League	18	0	3	1	13	5	-		34	6
2007	Chunnam Dragons	K-League	18	2	3	0	1	0	5	1	27	3
2008	Chunnam Dragons	K-League	15	0	1	0	3	0	5	0	24	0
2009	Chunnam Dragons	K-League	15	2	1	0	1	0	-		17	2
2010	Gwangju Sangmu / Sangju Sangmu	K-League	15	0	1	0	1	0	-		17	0
2011	Gwangju Sangmu / Sangju Sangmu	K-League	3	0	0	0	1	0	-		4	0
Total	South Korea		118	6	17	2	21	5	10	1	166	14
Career total			118	6	17	2	21	5	10	1	166	14
