= Kim Jung-woo (footballer) =

South Korean footballer (born 1982)

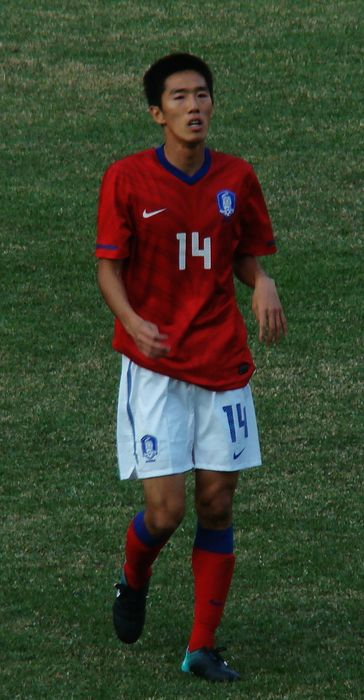
- Kim at the 2010 Asian Games

Personal information
- Date of birth: 9 May 1982 (age 44)
- Place of birth: Seoul, South Korea
- Height: 1.84 m (6 ft 0 in)
- Position: Central midfielder

College career
Years	Team	Apps	(Gls)
2000–2002	Korea University		

Senior career*
Years	Team	Apps	(Gls)
2003–2005	Ulsan Hyundai Horang-i	75	(1)
2006–2007	Nagoya Grampus Eight	52	(7)
2008–2011	Seongnam Ilhwa Chunma	52	(7)
2010–2011	→ Sangju Sangmu Phoenix (draft)	40	(18)
2012–2014	Jeonbuk Hyundai Motors	41	(5)
2013–2014	→ Al Sharjah (loan)	21	(1)
2014–2015	Baniyas	6	(0)
2016–2017	BEC Tero Sasana	3	(0)
Total		290	(39)

International career
2000	South Korea U20	2	(0)
2003–2010	South Korea U23	40 (Note: Includes one appearance and one goal against non-national team, and thirteen appearances and one goal as an overage player (three appearances in Summer Olympics, seven appearances and one goal in Asian Games, three appearances in friendlies).)	(3)
2001	South Korea B		
2003–2012	South Korea	71	(6)
Medal record
Representing South Korea
Men's football
AFC Asian Cup
Bronze medal – third place	2007 Indonesia/Malaysia /Thailand/Vietnam	Team
Asian Games
Bronze medal – third place	2010 Guangzhou	Team
EAFF Championship
Silver medal – second place	2010 Japan	Team
East Asian Games
Silver medal – second place	2001 Osaka	Team
- * Club domestic league appearances and goals

- Kim Jung-woo
- Hangul: 김정우
- Hanja: 金正友
- RR: Gim Jeongu
- MR: Kim Chŏngu

Kim Jung-woo (Korean: 김정우; Hanja: 金正友, born 9 May 1982) is a former South Korean footballer.

== Club career ==
Kim was playing for military team Sangju Sangmu Phoenix to perform compulsory military service when participating in the 2010 FIFA World Cup, and his low salary (₩0.95 million per year) during the military service was the talk of fans before the match against Argentina which had one of the highest earners Lionel Messi.

Kim became the highest-paid player in the K League after moving to Jeonbuk Hyundai Motors on a three-year deal in January 2012.

== International career ==
Kim was part of South Korean under-23 team in 2004 and 2008 Summer Olympics.

Kim represented South Korea in the 2007 AFC Asian Cup. He scored Korea's winning goal against Indonesia and converted the decisive spot-kick in Korea's quarter-final penalty shootout victory over Iran. However, his penalty miss in the shootout against Iraq meant that South Korea went out in the semi-finals stage.

In the 2010 FIFA World Cup, Kim played a pivotal role as a holding midfielder for the South Korean team's advance to the round of 16. Despite rising interests from European clubs, he left to continue serving his country in Gwangju Sangmu.

On 22 March 2019, Kim retired through an official retirement ceremony before the match between South Korea and Bolivia at Ulsan Munsu Football Stadium.

== Style of play ==
Kim was nicknamed "Bones" due to his skinny build, but he had good stamina and positional sense. He took charge of center midfield with Ki Sung-yueng in the national team under manager Huh Jung-moo. Kim showed great work rate and defense while Ki concentrated on passing.

== Career statistics ==
=== Club ===
Appearances and goals by club, season and competition
Club	Season	League			National cup		League cup		Continental		Total	
Club	Season	Division	Apps	Goals	Apps	Goals	Apps	Goals	Apps	Goals	Apps	Goals
Ulsan Hyundai Horang-i	2003	K League	34	1	4	0	—		—		38	1
Ulsan Hyundai Horang-i	2004	K League	18	0	4	0	0	0	—		22	0
Ulsan Hyundai Horang-i	2005	K League	23	0	1	0	9	0	—		33	0
Ulsan Hyundai Horang-i	Total		75	1	9	0	9	0	—		93	1
Nagoya Grampus Eight	2006	J1 League	25	3	1	0	4	0	—		30	3
Nagoya Grampus Eight	2007	J1 League	27	4	1	0	2	0	—		30	4
Nagoya Grampus Eight	Total		52	7	2	0	6	0	—		60	7
Seongnam Ilhwa Chunma	2008	K League	22	4	2	0	8	1	—		32	5
Seongnam Ilhwa Chunma	2009	K League	28	3	5	1	7	2	—		40	6
Seongnam Ilhwa Chunma	2011	K League	2	0	0	0	—		—		2	0
Seongnam Ilhwa Chunma	Total		52	7	7	1	15	3	—		74	11
Sangju Sangmu Phoenix (draft)	2010	K League	19	3	2	0	0	0	—		21	3
Sangju Sangmu Phoenix (draft)	2011	K League	21	15	2	1	5	3	—		28	19
Sangju Sangmu Phoenix (draft)	Total		40	18	4	1	5	3	—		49	22
Jeonbuk Hyundai Motors	2012	K League	33	5	2	0	—		5	0	40	5
Jeonbuk Hyundai Motors	2013	K League 1	8	0	0	0	—		6	1	14	1
Jeonbuk Hyundai Motors	Total		41	5	2	0	—		11	1	54	6
Al Sharjah (loan)	2013–14	UAE Pro League	21	1	0	0	6	0	—		27	1
Baniyas	2014–15	UAE Pro League	6	0	0	0	5	0	—		11	0
BEC Tero Sasana	2016	Thai League 1	3	0	?	?	?	?	—		3	0
Career total			290	39	24	2	46	6	11	1	371	48

=== International ===
Appearances and goals by national team and year
National team	Year	Apps	Goals
South Korea	2003	2	0
South Korea	2004	6	0
South Korea	2005	11	0
South Korea	2006	6	0
South Korea	2007	10	1
South Korea	2008	5	0
South Korea	2009	9	1
South Korea	2010	14	2
South Korea	2011	6	2
South Korea	2012	2	0
Career total		71	6

Results list South Korea's goal tally first.

List of international goals scored by Kim Jung-woo
No.	Date	Venue	Opponent	Score	Result	Competition
1	18 July 2007	Gelora Bung Karno Stadium, Jakarta, Indonesia	Indonesia	1–0	1–0	2007 AFC Asian Cup
2	4 February 2009	Maktoum Bin Rashid Al Maktoum Stadium, Dubai, United Arab Emirates	Bahrain	1–1	2–2	Friendly
3	9 January 2010	Rand Stadium, Johannesburg, South Africa	Zambia	1–2	2–4	Friendly
4	7 February 2010	National Stadium, Tokyo, Japan	Hong Kong	1–0	5–0	2010 EAFF Championship
5	25 March 2011	Seoul World Cup Stadium, Seoul, South Korea	Honduras	2–0	4–0	Friendly
6	2 September 2011	Goyang Stadium, Goyang, South Korea	Lebanon	5–0	6–0	2014 FIFA World Cup qualification

== Honours ==
Ulsan Hyundai Horang-i

- K League 1: 2005
- Korean League Cup runner-up: 2005

Seongnam Ilhwa Chunma

- Korean FA Cup: 2011

Jeonbuk Hyundai Motors

- Korean FA Cup runner-up: 2013

South Korea U23

- Asian Games bronze medal: 2010

South Korea B

- East Asian Games silver medal: 2001

South Korea

- AFC Asian Cup third place: 2007
- EAFF Championship runner-up: 2010

Individual

- K League All-Star: 2005, 2009, 2012
- K League 1 Best XI: 2009
- UAE Pro League Dream Team: 2013–14

== Notes ==
Sporting positions
Preceded by Choi Won-kwon	Sangju Sangmu Phoenix captain 2011	Succeeded by Kim Chi-gon
