= Cho Jae-yong =

South Korean footballer

Cho Jae-Yong
Personal information
- Full name: Cho Jae-Yong
- Date of birth: 21 April 1984 (age 42)
- Place of birth: South Korea
- Height: 1.83 m (6 ft 0 in)
- Position: Defender

Team information
- Current team: Busan TC

Youth career
- Yonsei University

Senior career*
Years	Team	Apps	(Gls)
2007–2013	Gyeongnam FC	16	(0)
2010–2011	→ Sangju Sangmu (army)	3	(0)
2014–	Busan TC	0	(0)
- * Club domestic league appearances and goals as of 4 December 2013

Cho Jae-Yong (Korean: 조재용; born 21 April 1984) is a South Korean footballer who played as a defender for Busan TC in the Korea National League.
