= Kim Ji-min (footballer, born 1984) =

South Korean footballer (born 1984)

Kim Ji-Min
Personal information
- Full name: Kim Ji-Min
- Date of birth: 27 November 1984 (age 41)
- Place of birth: South Korea
- Height: 1.75 m (5 ft 9 in)
- Position: Forward

Youth career
- 2003–2006: Hanyang University

Senior career*
Years	Team	Apps	(Gls)
2007	Ulsan Hyundai	0	(0)
2008	Pohang Steelers	1	(0)
2009–2011	Daejeon Citizen	6	(0)
2010–2011	→ Sangju Sangmu (army)	8	(0)
2013	Suwon FC	0	(0)
- * Club domestic league appearances and goals as of 18 December 2011

- Kim Ji-min
- Hangul: 김지민
- Hanja: 金智敏
- RR: Gim Jimin
- MR: Kim Chimin

Kim Ji-Min (Korean: 김지민; born 27 November 1984) is a South Korean footballer.

Kim was drafted in the 2009 K-League Draft by Ulsan Hyundai, but never appeared for either first team, and he moved to Pohang Steelers. After one of his less successful spells at Pohang he transferred to Daejeon Citizen in 2009 where he appeared in six games. In 2010, he joined Sangju Sangmu for military duty. Following discharge from the army, he returned to Daejeon in September 2011. After the 2011 season his contract with Daejeon was terminated by mutual consent.
