= Kim Ju-hwan (footballer, born 1982) =

South Korean footballer

Kim Ju-Hwan
Personal information
- Date of birth: 24 April 1982 (age 44)
- Place of birth: South Korea
- Height: 1.75 m (5 ft 9 in)
- Position: Midfielder

Youth career
- Ajou University

Senior career*
Years	Team	Apps	(Gls)
2005–2011	Daegu FC	59	(2)
2010–2011	→ Sangju Sangmu (army)	8	(0)
- * Club domestic league appearances and goals as of 21 September 2011

- Kim Ju-hwan
- Hangul: 김주환
- Hanja: 金周奐
- RR: Gim Juhwan
- MR: Kim Chuhwan

Kim Ju-Hwan (Korean: 김주환; born 24 April 1982) is a South Korean football midfielder who last played for Daegu FC.

== Club career ==
Kim was drafted to Daegu FC from Ajou University in Suwon in 2005, and established himself as a regular in the Daegu FC senior men's squad. For the 2010 season, Kim has joined Sangmu while he fulfills his compulsory two-year military service.

== Club career statistics ==
As of 21 September 2011

Club performance			League		Cup		League Cup		Continental		Total	
Season	Club	League	Apps	Goals	Apps	Goals	Apps	Goals	Apps	Goals	Apps	Goals
South Korea			League		KFA Cup		League Cup		Asia		Total	
2005	Daegu FC	K-League	15	1	3	0	0	0	-		18	1
2006	Daegu FC	K-League	12	0	0	0	7	0	-		19	0
2007	Daegu FC	K-League	13	0	1	0	9	1	-		23	1
2008	Daegu FC	K-League	6	0	1	0	4	2	-		11	2
2009	Daegu FC	K-League	13	1	2	0	4	0	-		19	1
2010	Sangju Sangmu	K-League	1	0	0	0	0	0	-		1	0
2011	Sangju Sangmu	K-League	7	0	1	0	2	0	-		10	0
2011	Daegu FC	K-League	0	0	-		-		-		0	0
Career total			67	2	8	0	26	3	-		101	5
