= Lee Je-kyu =

South Korean footballer

Lee Je-Kyu
Personal information
- Full name: Lee Je-Kyu
- Date of birth: 10 July 1986 (age 40)
- Place of birth: South Korea
- Height: 1.83 m (6 ft 0 in)
- Position: Striker

Team information
- Current team: Mokpo City

Youth career
- Cheongju University

Senior career*
Years	Team	Apps	(Gls)
2009–2011	Daejeon Citizen	12	(1)
2010–2011	→ Sangju Sangmu Phoenix (army)	8	(0)
2012	Suwon Bluewings	0	(0)
2013–	Mokpo City	0	(0)
- * Club domestic league appearances and goals as of 18 December 2011

Lee Je-Kyu (Korean: 이제규; born 10 July 1986) is a South Korean football player who plays for Mokpo City.
