= 2008 Daegu FC season =

Daegu F.C.
2008 season
- Chairman: Kim Bum-il (Mayor)
- Manager: Byun Byung-Joo
- K-League: 11th
- FA Cup: Semi final
- K-League Cup: Group B 5th
- Top goalscorer: League: Lee Keun-Ho (11); All: Eninho (18)
- Highest home attendance: 34,135 vs Chunnam Dragons (26 Oct 2008)
- Lowest home attendance: 1,231 vs Daejeon Citizen (28 Jun 2008)
Home colours	Away colours

The 2008 season was Daegu F.C.'s 6th season in South Korea's K-League.

== Season summary ==
Kim Hyun-Soo, centre back and captain from the previous season, retired from competitive football in the off-season, and was appointed manager of Daegu FC's under-18 team, established the previous season. The U-18 side was to compete in the U-18 Challenge League. As a replacement for Kim, Hwang Sun-Pil, an experienced defender brought into the club in 2004 as a draftee, was made captain.

In 2008, Daegu became famous with their extremely aggressive football, becoming the joint equal top-scoring team of the K-League, alongside Suwon. However, they also conceded the most goals in the league, with Baek Min-Cheol letting 58 goals into his goal. This was twelve goals more than the next worst team, Gwangju, which conceded "only" 46 goals. Nonetheless, because of their offensive approach, their style of play was nicknamed "Bullet Football", for its speedy and attacking focus. An eleventh place in the K-League standings was the eventual outcome, winning a reasonably impressive eight games, but drawing only two, both against Daejeon Citizen. Lee Keun-Ho played in all 26 regular season games, finding the net eleven times. Jang Nam-Seok scored ten goals, with Eninho the best of the imports, with eight.

For the first time in its history, Daegu reached the semi-finals of the Korean FA Cup, by defeating Ulsan in the quarterfinals, following a win in the round of 16 over Ansan Hallelujah. However, they then lost to their opponents Pohang Steelers in a 2–0 loss. The club placed fifth (out of six) in their group in the Samsung Hauzen Cup. Eninho averaged better than a goal a game in this particular competition, scoring nine from eight appearances.

== Squad ==
Note: Flags indicate national team as defined under FIFA eligibility rules; some limited exceptions apply. Players may hold more than one non-FIFA nationality.

No.	Pos.	Nation	Player
1	GK	KOR	Kim Young-Moo
2	MF	KOR	Baek Young-Cheol
3	DF	KOR	Jang Sang-Won
4	DF	KOR	Cho Hong-Kyu
5	DF	KOR	Hwang Sun-Pil (captain)
6	MF	KOR	Moon Joo-Won
7	MF	KOR	Ha Dae-Sung
9	FW	KOR	Jang Nam-Seok
10	FW	KOR	Lee Keun-Ho
11	MF	BRA	Eninho
12	FW	KOR	Jeon Sang-Dae
14	MF	KOR	Lee Tae-Woo
15	MF	KOR	Cho Hyung-Ik
16	DF	KOR	Bang Dae-Jong
17	MF	KOR	Jin Kyung-Sun
18	MF	KOR	Lim Hyun-Woo
19	MF	KOR	Choi Jong-Hyuk

No.	Pos.	Nation	Player
20	MF	KOR	Yoon Seong-Min
21	GK	KOR	Baek Min-Cheol
22	DF	KOR	Hwang Ji-Yoon
23	MF	KOR	Nam Hyun-Seong
24	DF	KOR	Park Jung-Sik
25	DF	KOR	Yoon Yeo-San
26	DF	KOR	Ahn Tae-Yoon
27	MF	KOR	Yoon Soo-Joon
28	MF	KOR	Kim Ju-Hwan
29	MF	KOR	Park Bo-Bae
30	DF	KOR	Yang Seung-Won
31	GK	KOR	Jo Young-Joon
34	DF	KOR	Lee Sung-Hwan
35	DF	BRA	Leandro
37	DF	KOR	Kim Jong-Kyung
85	FW	BRA	Geovane

== Players In/Out ==
=== In ===
15	MF	KOR	Cho Hyung-Ik (drafted from Myongji University)
16	DF	KOR	Bang Dae-Jong (drafted from Dong-A University)
20	MF	KOR	Yoon Seong-Min (drafted from Chung-Ang University)
23	MF	KOR	Nam Hyun-Seong (drafted from Sungkyunkwan University)
27	MF	KOR	Yoon Soo-Joon (drafted from Kyungil University)
30	DF	KOR	Yang Seung-Won (drafted from Daegu University)
32	DF	KOR	Choi Jong-Moon (drafted from Chosun University)
33	DF	KOR	Park Ki-Han (drafted from Hanyang University)
2	MF	KOR	Baek Young-Cheol (from Gyeongnam FC)
3	DF	KOR	Jang Sang-Won (from Ulsan Hyundai Horang-i)
8	FW	BRA	Alexsandro (from (Brazil) Coruripe)
12	FW	KOR	Jeon Sang-Dae (from Gyeongnam FC)
13	FW	BRA	Jou Silva (from (Brazil) ADAP)
22	DF	KOR	Hwang Ji-Yoon (from Jeju United FC)
35	DF	BRA	Leandro (from (Saudi Arabia) Al-Ahli)
37	DF	KOR	Kim Jong-Kyung (from Jeonbuk Hyundai Motors)
85	FW	BRA	Geovane (from (Brazil) América de Natal)

=== Out ===
2	MF	KOR	Na Hee-Keun (Released)
7	FW	BRA	Selmir (end of contract)
11	FW	BRA	Luizinho (to Ulsan Hyundai Horang-i)
15	DF	KOR	Kim Hyun-Soo (Retired)
16	FW	KOR	Hwang Yeon-Seok (to Goyang Kookmin Bank)
19	DF	KOR	Jung Ho-Jin (to Busan Kyotong)
24	DF	KOR	Park Jong-Jin (to Gwangju Sangmu)
26	MF	KOR	Kim Jae-Hong (end of contract)
27	MF	KOR	Lee Mun-Sun (to Korean Police Soccer Team)
29	MF	KOR	Song Jeong-Woo (end of contract)
32	DF	KOR	Park Yoon-Hwa (to Gyeongnam FC)
13	FW	BRA	Jou Silva (Released)
8	FW	BRA	Alexsandro (Released)
32	DF	KOR	Choi Jong-Moon (Released)
33	DF	KOR	Park Ki-Han (Released)

== Statistics ==
No.	Nat.	Pos.	Player	Total		K-League		Korean FA Cup		Hauzen Cup	
No.	Nat.	Pos.	Player	Apps	Goals	Apps	Goals	Apps	Goals	Apps	Goals
1	GK		Kim Young-Moo	0	0	0	0	0	0	0	0
2	MF		Baek Young-Cheol	39	0	26	0	3	0	10	0
3	DF		Jang Sang-Won	11	0	6	0	1	0	4	0
4	DF		Cho Hong-Kyu	6	0	5	0	0	0	1	0
5	DF		Hwang Sun-Pil	33	2	23	1	2	1	8	0
6	MF		Moon Joo-Won	27	2	17	2	1	0	9	0
7	MF		Ha Dae-Sung	34	6	24	4	3	1	7	1
9	FW		Jang Nam-Seok	32	11	24	10	3	0	5	1
10	FW		Lee Keun-Ho	35	15	26	11	3	2	6	2
11	FW		Eninho	30	19	19	8	3	2	8	9
12	FW		Jeon Sang-Dae	0	0	0	0	0	0	0	0
14	MF		Lee Tae-Woo	0	0	0	0	0	0	0	0
15	MF		Cho Hyung-Ik	35	1	22	1	3	0	10	0
16	DF		Bang Dae-Jong	8	0	3	0	1	0	4	0
17	MF		Jin Kyung-Sun	38	0	25	0	4	0	9	0
18	MF		Lim Hyun-Woo	22	0	14	0	2	0	6	0
19	MF		Choi Jong-Hyuk	20	0	9	0	4	0	7	0
20	MF		Yoon Seong-Min	0	0	0	0	0	0	0	0
21	GK		Baek Min-Cheol	40	-82	26	-58	4	-5	10	-19
22	DF		Hwang Ji-Yoon	35	2	24	2	4	0	7	0
23	MF		Nam Hyun-Seong	4	0	2	0	0	0	2	0
24	DF		Park Jung-Sik	24	0	14	0	3	0	7	0
25	DF		Yoon Yeo-San	15	1	10	1	2	0	3	0
26	DF		Ahn Tae-Yoon	0	0	0	0	0	0	0	0
27	MF		Yoon Soo-Jun	0	0	0	0	0	0	0	0
28	MF		Kim Ju-Hwan	11	2	6	0	1	0	4	2
29	MF		Park Bo-Bae	0	0	0	0	0	0	0	0
30	DF		Yang Seung-Won	10	1	7	1	0	0	3	0
31	GK		Jo Young-Joon	0	0	0	0	0	0	0	0
34	DF		Lee Sung-Hwan	0	0	0	0	0	0	0	0
35	DF		Leandro	16	0	11	0	3	0	2	0
37	DF		Kim Jong-Kyung	2	0	0	0	0	0	2	0
85	FW		Geovane	15	3	10	3	3	0	2	0
8	FW		Alexsandro	15	1	8	0	1	0	6	1
13	FW		Jou Silva	2	0	2	0	0	0	0	0
32	DF		Choi Jong-Moon	0	0	0	0	0	0	0	0
33	DF		Park Ki-Han	0	0	0	0	0	0	0	0

== K-League ==
=== Matches ===
Round	Date	Opponents	Ground	Score	Scorers	Attendance
1	9 March 2008	Gyeongnam FC	A	2 – 4	Yoon Yeo-San 45', Lee Keun-Ho 69'	23,415
2	16 March 2008	Busan I'Park	H	3 – 2	Hwang Ji-Yoon 5', 67', Lee Keun-Ho 86'	29,785
3	30 March 2008	FC Seoul	A	1 – 3	Eninho 32'	20,175
4	6 April 2008	Ulsan Hyundai Horang-i	H	3 – 1	Jang Nam-Seok 40^{sec}, 36', Moon Joo-Won 63'	21,675
5	12 April 2008	Jeonbuk Hyundai Motors	A	3 – 0	Yang Seung-Won 77', Lee Keun-Ho 87', Jang Nam-Seok 90'	7,238
6	19 April 2008	Pohang Steelers	A	0 – 3		7,517
7	27 April 2008	Incheon United	H	2 – 4	Jang Nam-Seok 34', 74'	15,439
8	5 May 2008	Gwangju Sangmu Phoenix	H	3 – 2	Eninho 6', Jang Nam-Seok 47', Lee Keun-Ho 85'	28,537
9	10 May 2008	Suwon Samsung Bluewings	A	2 – 3	Lee Keun-Ho 27', Eninho 30'	30,202
10	18 May 2008	Jeju United	H	2 – 4	Eninho 38', Hwang Sun-Pil 54'	18,702
11	25 May 2008	Chunnam Dragons	A	3 – 2	Lee Sang-Il 45' ^{(og)}, Jang Nam-Seok 68', Lee Keun-Ho 89'	15,700
12	28 June 2008	Daejeon Citizen	H	1 – 1	Jang Nam-Seok 36'	1,231
13	5 July 2008	Seongnam Ilhwa Chunma	A	1 – 4	Lee Keun-Ho 58'	4,552
14	12 July 2008	Gyeongnam FC	H	1 – 4	Lee Keun-Ho 29'	15,138
15	19 July 2008	Busan I'Park	A	4 – 0	Eninho 19', 89', Ha Dae-Sung 79', Cho Hyung-Ik 87'	3,527
16	23 August 2008	FC Seoul	H	1 – 2	Jang Nam-Seok 41'	16,737
17	30 August 2008	Ulsan Hyundai Horang-i	A	2 – 3	Eninho 44', Geovane 94'	6,127
18	13 September 2008	Pohang Steelers	H	1 – 4	Lee Keun-Ho 63'	7,285
19	20 September 2008	Incheon United	A	2 – 0	Ahn Hyun-Sik 15' ^{(og)}, Jang Nam-Seok 79'	5,767
20	29 September 2008	Gwangju Sangmu Phoenix	A	4 – 1	Lee Keun-Ho 11', 69', Eninho 67', Geovane 92'	5,312
21	5 October 2008	Suwon Samsung Bluewings	H	1 – 2	Ha Dae-Sung 74'	21,815
22	18 October 2008	Jeju United FC	A	2 – 3	Geovane 8', Ha Dae-Sung 28'	5,361
23	26 October 2008	Chunnam Dragons	H	1 – 2	Moon Joo-Won 49'	34,135
24	29 October 2008	Jeonbuk Hyundai Motors	H	1 – 3	Ha Dae-Sung 34'	2,013
25	1 November 2008	Daejeon Citizen	A	0 – 0		16,907
26	9 November 2008	Seongnam Ilhwa Chunma	H	0 – 1		9,131

=== Standings ===
Pos	Team	Pld	W	D	L	GF	GA	GD	Pts
10	Jeju United	26	7	7	12	23	31	−8	28
11	Daegu FC	26	8	2	16	46	58	−12	26
12	Busan IPark	26	5	7	14	30	39	−9	22

Source: RSSSF (in English), K League (in Korean)
Rules for classification: 1) Points; 2) Goal difference; 3) Goals scored

Pos	Team	Qualification
1	Suwon Samsung Bluewings (C)	Qualification for the Champions League
2	FC Seoul	Qualification for the Champions League
3	Ulsan Hyundai	Qualification for the Champions League
4	Jeonbuk Hyundai Motors	
5	Seongnam Ilhwa Chunma	
6	Pohang Steelers	Qualification for the Champions League (Note: Qualified as champions of the FA Cup.)

Source: RSSSF
(C) Champions

== Korean FA Cup ==
=== Matches ===
Round	Date	Opponents	Ground	Score	Scorers
Round of 16	20 August 2008	Ansan Hallelujah	A	3–1	Hwang Sun-Pil 5', Eninho 45+1', Ha Dae-Sung 62'
Quarterfinals	5 November 2008	Ulsan Hyundai Horang-i	H	2–1	Lee Keun-Ho 38', 76'
Semifinals	18 December 2008	Pohang Steelers	N	0–2

(N) = Neutral Ground

== Samsung Hauzen Cup ==
=== Matches ===
Round	Date	Opponents	Ground	Score	Scorers	Attendance
1	19 March 2008	Seongnam Ilhwa Chunma	H	2 – 1	Lee Keun-Ho 47', Ha Dae-Sung 87'	2,531
2	16 April 2008	Ulsan Hyundai Horang-i	A	0 – 1		1,321
3	30 April 2008	Jeonbuk Hyundai Motors	H	0 – 2		2,153
4	14 May 2008	Daejeon Citizen	A	1 – 4	Alexsandro 68'	3,732
5	18 June 2008	Gwangju Sangmu Phoenix	A	3 – 1	Eninho 5', 81', Jang Nam-Seok 42'	1,573
6	25 June 2008	Seongnam Ilhwa Chunma	A	3 – 4	Kim Ju-Hwan 1', Cho Hyung-Ik 7', Eninho 65'	9,242
7	2 July 2008	Gwangju Sangmu Phoenix	H	2 – 2	Kim Ju-Hwan 38', Eninho 85'	2,137
8	27 August 2008	Daejeon Citizen	H	3 – 1	Eninho 42', 58', 79'	8,131
9	6 September 2008	Jeonbuk Hyundai Motors	A	1 – 1	Eninho 71'	6,947
10	17 September 2008	Ulsan Hyundai Horang-i	H	1 – 2	Eninho 35'	3,351

=== Standings ===
Pos	Team	Pld	W	D	L	GF	GA	GD	Pts
4	Daejeon Citizen	10	4	2	4	15	14	+1	14
5	Daegu FC	10	3	2	5	16	19	−3	11
6	Gwangju Sangmu	10	0	3	7	5	17	−12	3

Source: RSSSF

Awards

- Hauzen Cup 2008 Top Scorer: Eninho (9 Goals)

== See also ==
- Daegu FC
