= 2009 Daegu FC season =

Daegu F.C.
2009 season
- Chairman: Kim Bum-il (Mayor)
- Manager: Byun Byung-Joo
- K-League: 15th
- FA Cup: Quarter finals
- Peace Cup Korea: Group A 3rd
- Top goalscorer: League: Léo (4); All: Cho Hyung-Ik (7)
- Highest home attendance: 32,250 vs Incheon United (6 Sep 2009)
- Lowest home attendance: 1,504 vs Seongnam Ilhwa Chunma (22 Apr 2009)
Home colours	Away colours

The 2009 season was Daegu F.C.'s 7th season in South Korea's K-League.

== Season summary ==
This season would transpire to be one of the worst, if not the worst, in the club's history. In a now expanded league of 15 clubs, thanks to new entrant Gangwon FC, Daegu would finish last. Jang Nam-Seok, who had played for the club since 2006 and has been a prolific scorer for the club, was appointed captain for the 2009 season. While defensively, there had been improvements, the club lost its attacking focus of the previous season. The leading scorer of the previous season, Lee Keun-Ho had completed his contract and moved to Japanese club Júbilo Iwata and Eninho, who had been one of the club's best performing imports, transferred to Jeonbuk Hyundai Motors. Their replacements, Émile Mbamba and Lazar Popović, were not of the same calibre, and would be released mid-season.

Only five games were won all season in the K-League. That even five games were won was fortunate, and this number is somewhat deceptive as it was as late as the 21st round that the club had but a single win. It was only a late season string of four consecutive wins that saved the club's blushes. This late season revival was far too late to lift the club from the foot of the table, from where it had been anchored since round 11 of the competition. An midseason incoming transfer, Leo would score four goals while midfielder draftee Lee Seul-Ki scored three goals from 25 games. That a midfielder playing as an occasional part-time forward would be the club's second highest scorer only highlighted the club's lack of offensive penetration.

In the FA Cup, Daegu made it to the quarterfinals, beating Gyeongnam FC in a penalty shootout in the round of 16. In the quarterfinal itself, against Daejeon Citizen, the game finished as a one all draw, Daegu's goal coming from Lee Seul-Ki. For the second consecutive match, the result would come down to a penalty shootout. This time, Daegu lost out. In the league cup, now known as the Peace Cup Korea 2009 finished third in their group, one point away from qualifying for the knockout phase of the cup. Cho Hyung-Ik, another midfielder, would be the club's highest scorer in the competition with three goals.

Off the field, Park Jong-Sun was elected as the third representative director of Daegu FC on 11 May 2009. Lee Dae-Sub and Choi Jong-Joon were the preceding representative directors. Daegu FC also signed a memorandum of understanding with the regionalised 4th level of Argentinian football Torneo Argentino B side Deportivo Coreano on 31 August 2009. It was hoped that this will lead to promising Argentinean players playing for the club.

The 2009 season also saw a change in the club's kit provider; Joma replaced previous supplier Lotto Sport Italia.

On December 22, 2009, Daegu FC appointed Lee Young-jin as manager to lead the club for the 2010 season. Lee, who has previously coached FC Seoul, replaced Byun Byung-Joo who had been manager since 2006. Byun resigned after being embroiled in a scandal involving a player's agent and payoffs for selecting specific players.

== Squad ==
Note: Flags indicate national team as defined under FIFA eligibility rules; some limited exceptions apply. Players may hold more than one non-FIFA nationality.

No.	Pos.	Nation	Player
1	GK	KOR	Cho Jun-Ho
2	MF	KOR	Baek Young-Cheol
3	DF	KOR	Choi Sang-Hyun
4	MF	KOR	Cho Han-Bum (on loan from Pohang Steelers)
5	DF	CHN	Feng Xiaoting
6	MF	KOR	Lee Seul-Ki
7	MF	BRA	Valdeir
8	MF	KOR	Kim Chang-hee
9	FW	KOR	Jang Nam-Seok (captain)
10	FW	BRA	Léo
11	MF	KOR	Kim Min-Kyun
12	MF	KOR	Jang Sang-Won
13	MF	KOR	Cho Hyung-Ik
14	MF	KOR	Choi Jong-Bum
15	MF	KOR	Kim Oh-Sung
16	DF	KOR	Bang Dae-Jong
17	MF	KOR	Han Jung-Hwa (on loan from Busan I'Park)

No.	Pos.	Nation	Player
18	MF	KOR	Lim Hyun-Woo
19	MF	KOR	Choi Jong-Hyuk
20	MF	KOR	Yoon Seong-Min
21	GK	KOR	Baek Min-Cheol
22	DF	KOR	Chong Woo-Sung
23	MF	KOR	Nam Hyun-Seong
24	DF	KOR	Park Jung-Sik
25	DF	KOR	Yoon Yeo-San (vice-captain)
26	DF	KOR	Lee Sang-Deok
27	MF	KOR	Lee Hyun-Chang
28	MF	KOR	Kim Ju-Hwan
29	DF	KOR	Kim Myung-Ryong
30	DF	KOR	Yang Seung-Won
31	GK	KOR	Cho Young-Joon
32	FW	KOR	Cha Jung-Min
33	DF	KOR	Kim Jong-Kyung
34	DF	KOR	Park Jong-Jin

== Players In/Out ==
=== In ===
Date	Pos.	No.	Player	From	Type	Source (in Korean)
20 November 2008	MF	6	(South Korea) Lee Seul-Ki	(South Korea) Dongguk University	Drafted	Daegu FC
20 November 2008	MF	8	(South Korea) Kim Chang-hee	(South Korea) Konkuk University	Drafted	Daegu FC
20 November 2008	DF	26	(South Korea) Lee Sang-Deok	(South Korea) Dong-A University	Drafted	Daegu FC
20 November 2008	MF	15	(South Korea) Kim Oh-Sung	(South Korea) Korea University	Drafted	Daegu FC
20 November 2008	DF	22	(South Korea) Chong Woo-Sung	(South Korea) Chungang University	Drafted	Daegu FC
20 November 2008	FW	11	(South Korea) Kim Min-Kyun	(South Korea) Myongji University	Drafted	Daegu FC
20 November 2008	FW	32	(South Korea) Cha Jung-Min	(South Korea) Ajou University	Drafted	Daegu FC
20 November 2008	DF	29	(South Korea) Kim Myung-Ryong	(South Korea) Myongji University	Drafted	Daegu FC
20 November 2008	MF	27	(South Korea) Lee Hyun-Chang	(South Korea) Yeungnam University	Drafted	Daegu FC
13 January 2009	GK	1	(South Korea) Cho Jun-Ho	(South Korea) Jeju United FC	Transferred	Daegu FC
13 January 2009	MF	17	(South Korea) Han Jung-Hwa	(South Korea) Busan I'Park	Loan	Daegu FC
24 February 2009	FW	7	(Cameroon) Émile Mbamba	(Indonesia) Arema Malang	Transferred	Daegu FC
24 February 2009	FW	10	(Serbia) Lazar Popović	(Serbia) FK Čukarički Stankom	Transferred	Daegu FC
2 March 2009	MF	14	(South Korea) Choi Jong-Bum	(South Korea) Pohang Steelers	Transferred	Daegu FC
2 March 2009	MF	3	(South Korea) Choi Sang-Hyun	(South Korea) Seongnam Ilhwa	Transferred	Daegu FC
1 July 2009	MF	7	(Brazil) Valdeir	(Brazil) Joinville-SC	Transferred	Daegu FC
3 July 2009	FW	10	(Brazil) Léo	(Poland) Górnik Zabrze	Transferred	Daegu FC
29 July 2009	MF	4	(South Korea) Cho Han-Bum	(South Korea) Pohang Steelers	Loan	Daegu FC
22 October 2009	DF	34	(South Korea) Park Jong-Jin	(South Korea) Gwangju Sangmu	Leave the army	Daegu FC

=== Out ===
Date	Pos.	No.	Player	To	Type	Source (in Korean)
10 December 2008	FW	5	(South Korea) Hwang Sun-Pil	(South Korea) Gwangju Sangmu Phoenix	Military service	Naver
1 January 2009	FW	35	(Brazil) Leandro	(Brazil) Paraná Clube	Contract expired	
1 January 2009	FW	85	(Brazil) Geovane	(Brazil) América de Natal	Released	
1 January 2009	FW	12	(South Korea) Jeon Sang-Dae		Contract expired	
1 January 2009	MF	14	(South Korea) Lee Tae-Woo		Contract expired	
1 January 2009	DF	34	(South Korea) Lee Sung-Hwan		Released	
8 January 2009	MF	6	(South Korea) Moon Joo-Won	(South Korea) Gangwon FC	Transferred	Naver
19 January 2009	FW	11	(Brazil) Eninho	(South Korea) Jeonbuk Hyundai Motors	Transferred	Jeonbuk Hyundai
28 January 2009	DF	4	(South Korea) Cho Hong-Kyu	(South Korea) Pohang Steelers	Transferred	Pohang Steelers
16 February 2009	DF	22	(South Korea) Hwang Ji-Yoon	(South Korea) Daejeon Citizen	Transferred	Daejeon Citizen
2 March 2009	MF	7	(South Korea) Ha Dae-Sung	(South Korea) Jeonbuk Hyundai Motors	Transferred	Jeonbuk Hyundai
2 March 2009	MF	17	(South Korea) Jin Kyung-Sun	(South Korea) Jeonbuk Hyundai Motors	Transferred	Jeonbuk Hyundai
2 April 2009	FW	10	(South Korea) Lee Keun-Ho	(Japan) Júbilo Iwata	Contract expired	Naver
30 June 2009	FW	7	(Cameroon) Émile Mbamba	(Bulgaria) Botev Plovdiv	Released	
30 June 2009	FW	10	(Serbia) Lazar Popović	(Bosnia and Herzegovina) FK Željezničar Sarajevo	Released	

== Statistics ==
Updated to games played 1 November 2009.

No.	Nat.	Pos.	Player	Total		K-League		Korean FA Cup		Pice Cup Korea	
No.	Nat.	Pos.	Player	Apps	Goals	Apps	Goals	Apps	Goals	Apps	Goals
1	GK	(South Korea) KOR	Cho Jun-Ho	14	-29	14	-29	0	0	0	0
2	MF	(South Korea) KOR	Baek Young-Cheol	27	1	21	1	2	0	4	0
3	DF	(South Korea) KOR	Choi Sang-Hyun	4	0	4	0	0	0	0	0
4	MF	(South Korea) KOR	Cho Han-Bum	5	0	5	0	0	0	0	0
5	DF	(China) CHN	Feng Xiaoting	22	0	19	0	2	0	1	0
6	MF	(South Korea) KOR	Lee Seul-Ki	31	4	25	3	2	1	4	0
7	MF	(Brazil) BRA	Valdeir	16	2	15	2	1	0	0	0
8	MF	(South Korea) KOR	Kim Chang-hee	15	0	11	0	3	0	1	0
9	FW	(South Korea) KOR	Jang Nam-Seok	17	0	14	0	2	0	1	0
10	MF	(Brazil) BRA	Léo	15	4	14	4	1	0	0	0
11	MF	(South Korea) KOR	Kim Min-Kyun	34	1	27	1	3	0	4	0
12	MF	(South Korea) KOR	Jang Sang-Won	2	0	2	0	0	0	0	0
13	MF	(South Korea) KOR	Cho Hyung-Ik	35	7	27	3	3	1	5	3
14	MF	(South Korea) KOR	Choi Jong-Bum	5	0	2	0	1	0	2	0
15	MF	(South Korea) KOR	Kim Oh-Sung	5	0	5	0	0	0	0	0
16	DF	(South Korea) KOR	Bang Dae-Jong	27	2	20	2	2	0	5	0
17	MF	(South Korea) KOR	Han Jung-Hwa	22	0	15	0	2	0	5	0
18	MF	(South Korea) KOR	Lim Hyun-Woo	3	0	2	0	0	0	1	0
19	MF	(South Korea) KOR	Choi Jong-Hyuk	21	0	13	0	3	0	5	0
20	MF	(South Korea) KOR	Yoon Seong-Min	0	0	0	0	0	0	0	0
21	GK	(South Korea) KOR	Baek Min-Cheol	23	-20	15	-13	3	-1	5	-6
22	DF	(South Korea) KOR	Chong Woo-Sung	0	0	0	0	0	0	0	0
23	MF	(South Korea) KOR	Nam Hyun-Seong	10	0	8	0	0	0	2	0
24	DF	(South Korea) KOR	Park Jung-Sik	15	0	10	0	3	0	2	0
25	DF	(South Korea) KOR	Yoon Yeo-San	26	0	20	0	2	0	4	0
26	DF	(South Korea) KOR	Lee Sang-Deok	7	3	5	1	0	0	2	2
27	MF	(South Korea) KOR	Lee Hyun-Chang	23	2	18	1	3	1	2	0
28	MF	(South Korea) KOR	Kim Ju-Hwan	20	1	14	1	2	0	4	0
29	DF	(South Korea) KOR	Kim Myung-Ryong	0	0	0	0	0	0	0	0
30	DF	(South Korea) KOR	Yang Seung-Won	23	0	18	0	3	0	2	0
31	GK	(South Korea) KOR	Cho Young-Joon	0	0	0	0	0	0	0	0
32	FW	(South Korea) KOR	Cha Jung-Min	0	0	0	0	0	0	0	0
33	DF	(South Korea) KOR	Kim Jong-Kyung	0	0	0	0	0	0	0	0
34	DF	(South Korea) KOR	Park Jong-Jin	1	0	1	0	0	0	0	0
	FW	(Cameroon) CMR	Émile Mbamba	8	0	5	0	0	0	3	0
	FW	(Serbia) SRB	Lazar Popović	14	3	9	1	1	1	4	1

== K-League ==
=== Matches ===
Match won	Match drawn	Match lost

Round	Date	Opponents	H / A	Score	Scorers	Attendance
1	8 March 2009	Seongnam Ilhwa	H	1 – 1	Cho Hyung-Ik 22'	15,429
2	15 March 2009	Jeonbuk Hyundai	A	0 – 2		11,043
3	22 March 2009	Pohang Steelers	H	2 – 2	Lee Sang-Deok 50', Lee Seul-Ki 71'	5,342
4	4 April 2009	Daejeon Citizen	A	0 – 2		4,724
5	12 April 2009	Jeju United	H	2 – 1	Kim Ju-Hwan 42', Bang Dae-Jong 83'	3,215
6	18 April 2009	FC Seoul	A	0 – 0		11,305
7	25 April 2009	Busan I'Park	A	0 – 1		4,590
8	2 May 2009	Incheon United	A	1 – 2	Lee Seul-Ki 12'	3,240
9	10 May 2009	Chunnam Dragons	H	1 – 2	Baek Young-Cheol 3'	4,396
10	16 May 2009	Gangwon FC	A	2 – 2	Kim Min-Kyun 46', Lazar Popović 91'	5,129
11	24 May 2009	Gwangju Sangmu	H	1 – 3	Cho Hyung-Ik 3'	4,396
12	20 June 2009	Suwon Bluewings	A	0 – 1		10,206
13	28 June 2009	Gyeongnam FC	H	1 – 3	Bang Dae-Jong 71'	13,375
14	12 July 2009	Ulsan Hyundai	A	1 – 3	Lee Seul-Ki 47'	10,572
15	18 July 2009	Jeonbuk Hyundai	H	0 – 3		7,333
16	25 July 2009	Pohang Steelers	A	0 – 3		10,220
17	1 August 2009	Daejeon Citizen	H	2 – 2	Lee Hyun-Chang 51', Valdeir 75'	10,059
18	15 August 2009	Jeju United	A	0 – 0		3,572
19	22 August 2009	FC Seoul	H	0 – 3		5,876
20	29 August 2009	Busan I'Park	H	1 – 1	Cho Hyung-Ik 78'	3,550
21	6 September 2009	Incheon United	H	0 – 0		32,250
22	12 September 2009	Chunnam Dragons	A	1 – 0	Léo 25'	1,1980
23	20 September 2009	Gangwon FC	H	2 – 1	Léo 1', 68'	3,414
24	27 September 2009	Gwangju Sangmu	A	1 – 0	Léo 91'	3,155
25	2 October 2009	Suwon Bluewings	H	1 – 0	Valdeir 24'	4,723
26	11 October 2009	Gyeongnam FC	A	0 – 3		15,821
27	25 October 2009	Ulsan Hyundai Horang-i	H	0 – 1		3,201
28	1 November 2009	Seongnam Ilhwa	A	0 – 3		4,355

=== Standings ===
Pos	Team	Pld	W	D	L	GF	GA	GD	Pts
13	Gangwon FC	28	7	7	14	42	57	−15	28
14	Jeju United	28	7	7	14	22	44	−22	28
15	Daegu FC	28	5	8	15	20	45	−25	23

Source: K League (in Korean)
Rules for classification: 1) Points; 2) Goal difference; 3) Goals scored

Pos	Team	Qualification
1	Jeonbuk Hyundai Motors (C)	Qualification for the Champions League
2	Seongnam Ilhwa Chunma	Qualification for the Champions League
3	Pohang Steelers	Qualification for the Champions League
4	Jeonnam Dragons	
5	FC Seoul	
6	Incheon United	

Source: RSSSF
(C) Champions

=== Results summary ===
Overall								Home						Away					
Pld	W	D	L	GF	GA	GD	Pts	W	D	L	GF	GA	GD	W	D	L	GF	GA	GD
28	5	8	15	20	45	−25	23	3	5	6	14	23	−9	2	3	9	6	22	−16

Last updated: 2009-11-01.
Source: kleaguei.com (in Korean)

=== Results by round ===
Round	1	2	3	4	5	6	7	8	9	10	11	12	13	14	15	16	17	18	19	20	21	22	23	24	25	26	27	28
Ground	H	A	H	A	H	A	A	A	H	A	H	A	H	A	H	A	H	A	H	H	H	A	H	A	H	A	H	A
Result	D	L	D	L	W	D	L	L	L	D	L	L	L	L	L	L	D	D	L	D	D	W	W	W	W	L	L	L
Position	6	13	11	13	11	11	12	14	14	14	15	15	15	15	15	15	15	15	15	15	15	15	15	15	14	15	15	15

Updated to match(es) played on 2009-11-01. Source: kleaguei.com (in Korean)
A = Away; H = Home; W = Win; D = Draw; L = Loss

== Korean FA Cup ==
=== Matches ===
Round	Date	Opponents	H / A	Score	Scorers
Round of 32	13 May 2009	Suwon City	H	3 – 1	Cho Hyung-Ik 59', Lazar Popović 61', Lee Hyun-Chang 68'
Round of 16	1 July 2009	Gyeongnam FC	A	0 – 0 ^{(a.e.t.); 4 PK 5}
Quarterfinals	15 July 2009	Daejeon Citizen	H	1 – 1 ^{(a.e.t.); 3 PK 5}	Lee Seul-Ki 49'

== Peace Cup Korea ==
=== Matches ===
Round	Date	Opponents	H / A	Score	Scorers	Attendance
1	8 March 2009	Chunnam Dragons	A	2 – 3	Lazar Popović 63', Lee Sang-Deok 69'	4,865
2	8 April 2009	Gangwon FC	H	2 – 1	Cho Hyung-Ik 17', Lee Sang-Deok 65'	3,077
3	22 April 2009	Seongnam Ilhwa Chunma	H	0 – 0		1,504
4	5 May 2009	Daejeon Citizen	A	0 – 2		12,335
5	27 May 2009	Incheon United	H	2 – 0	Cho Hyung-Ik 10', 50'	1,512

=== Standings ===
Pos	Team	Pld	W	D	L	GF	GA	GD	Pts	SIC	ICU	DGU	JND	DJC	GWN
2	Incheon United	5	2	2	1	6	6	0	8	—	—	—	—	1–0	3–2
3	Daegu FC	5	2	1	2	6	6	0	7	0–0	2–0	—	—	—	2–1
4	Jeonnam Dragons	5	2	1	2	8	10	−2	7	—	1–1	3–2	—	—	—

Source: RSSSF

== See also ==
- Daegu F.C.
