= Kim Young-mu =

South Korean footballer

Kim Young-Mu
Personal information
- Full name: Kim Young-Mu (김영무)
- Date of birth: September 3, 1984 (age 42)
- Place of birth: South Korea
- Height: 1.85 m (6 ft 1 in)
- Position: Goalkeeper

Youth career
- Soongsil University

Senior career*
Years	Team	Apps	(Gls)
2007–2008	Daegu FC	3	(0)
- * Club domestic league appearances and goals as of 6 October 2008

Kim Young-Mu (born September 3, 1984) is a South Korean football player who played for Daegu FC as a goalkeeper.

== Club career ==
Kim was drafted from Soongsil University for Daegu FC's 2007 season. Although Baek Min-Cheol was the first choice keeper for Daegu FC, Kim would play three games in 2007, conceding 11 goals. Kim remained on the roster for the 2008 season, but left the club without playing a game that season.

== Club career statistics ==
As of 10 June 2011

Club performance			League		Cup		League Cup		Total	
Season	Club	League	Apps	Goals	Apps	Goals	Apps	Goals	Apps	Goals
South Korea			League		KFA Cup		League Cup		Total	
2007	Daegu F.C.	K-League	3	0	0	0	0	0	3	0
2008	Daegu F.C.	K-League	0	0	0	0	0	0	0	0
Career total			3	0	0	0	0	0	3	0
