= Hyun-sung =

- Hangul: 현성
- RR: Hyeonseong
- MR: Hyŏnsŏng

Hyun-sung (Korean: 현성) is a Korean given name. As of 2026, the name ranked 164th out of 36,179 male names and 1,874th out of 28,726 female names. A total of 3,545 people, consisting of 3,494 are male and 51 are female, were born with the name from 2008 to 2026.

Notable people with the name include:

- Bae Hyun-sung, South Korean actor
- Jang Hyun-sung, South Korean actor
- Park Hyun-sung, South Korean mixed martial artist
- Bang Hyun-sung, stage name Ryan Bang, South Korean celebrity based in the Philippines
- Lee Hyeon-seong, South Korean
- Nam Hyun-seong, South Korean football midfielder

== See also ==
- List of Korean given names
