= 2008 K League =

Samsung Hauzen K League
- Season: 2008
- Dates: Regular season: 8 March – 9 November 2008; Championship: 22 November – 7 December 2008
- Champions: Suwon Samsung Bluewings (4th title)
- Champions League: Suwon Samsung Bluewings; FC Seoul; Ulsan Hyundai; Pohang Steelers
- Matches: 182
- Goals: 485 (2.66 per match)
- Best Player: Lee Woon-jae
- Top goalscorer: Dudu (15 goals)
- Average attendance: 2,347,897

The 2008 K League was the 26th season of the K League. The regular season and playoffs' format was the same as the one used in the 2007 season. It began on March 8, and the final of the playoffs finished on 7 December.

On 2 August 2008, the first ever Jomo Cup kicked off. The K League All-Stars squared off against the J.League All-Stars at the Japan National Stadium. Lee Woon-jae was selected as the K League All-Star Team's captain and Cha Bum-kun managed the squad. The K League All-Stars won the game by a score of 3–1.

== Teams ==
Locations of the 2008 K League clubs

=== General information ===
| Club | Manager | City | Stadium | 2007 season |
|---|---|---|---|---|
| Busan IPark | (South Korea) Hwang Sun-hong | Busan | Busan Asiad Stadium | 13th place |
| Jeonnam Dragons | (South Korea) Park Hang-seo | Gwangyang | Gwang-Yang Stadium | 10th place |
| Daegu FC | (South Korea) Byun Byung-joo | Daegu | Daegu World Cup Stadium | 12th place |
| Daejeon Citizen | (South Korea) Kim Ho | Daejeon | Daejeon World Cup Stadium | 6th place |
| FC Seoul | (Turkey) Şenol Güneş | Seoul | Seoul World Cup Stadium | 7th place |
| Gwangju Sangmu | (South Korea) Lee Kang-jo | Gwangju | Gwangju World Cup Stadium | 14th place |
| Gyeongnam FC | (South Korea) Cho Kwang-rae | Changwon | Changwon Civil Stadium | 5th place |
| Incheon United | (South Korea) Chang Woe-ryong | Incheon | Incheon Munhak Stadium | 9th place |
| Jeju United | (Brazil) Arthur Bernardes | Seogwipo | Jeju World Cup Stadium | 11th place |
| Jeonbuk Hyundai Motors | (South Korea) Choi Kang-hee | Jeonju | Jeonju World Cup Stadium | 8th place |
| Pohang Steelers | (Brazil) Sérgio Farias | Pohang | Steelyard Stadium | Champions |
| Seongnam Ilhwa Chunma | (South Korea) Kim Hak-bum | Seongnam | Seongnam 2 Stadium | Runners-up |
| Suwon Samsung Bluewings | (South Korea) Cha Bum-kun | Suwon | Suwon World Cup Stadium | 3rd place |
| Ulsan Hyundai | (South Korea) Kim Jung-nam | Ulsan | Munsu Cup Stadium | 4th place |

=== Foreign players ===
| Club | Player 1 | Player 2 | Player 3 | Former player(s) |
|---|---|---|---|---|
| Busan IPark | (Brazil) Di Fábio | (Brazil) Paulinho Guará | (Brazil) Pingo | (Brazil) Reinaldo (Brazil) Zé Augusto |
| Jeonnam Dragons | (Brazil) Adriano Chuva | (Brazil) Renato | (Brazil) Victor Simões | (Brazil) Sandro Hiroshi |
| Daegu | (Brazil) Eninho | (Brazil) Leandro | (Brazil) Geovane | (Brazil) Alexsandro (Brazil) Jorge Santos |
| Daejeon Citizen | (Brazil) Walter Minhoca | (Brazil) Selmir | (Nigeria) Eric Obinna | (Brazil) Edson Araújo |
| FC Seoul | (Brazil) Adilson | (Montenegro) Dejan Damjanović | (Turkey) Ceyhun Eriş | (Netherlands) Kiki Musampa |
| Gwangju Sangmu Bulsajo | | | | |
| Gyeongnam | (Brazil) Almir | (Brazil) Índio | | (Brazil) Wellington Silva |
| Incheon United | (Montenegro) Dženan Radončić | (Serbia) Dragan Mladenović | (Serbia) Borko Veselinović | |
| Jeju United | (Brazil) Ednilton Souza | (Brazil) Rômulo | | (Brazil) Rafael Paty (Brazil) Ricardinho |
| Jeonbuk Hyundai Motors | (Brazil) Luiz Henrique | (Bosnia and Herzegovina) Jusuf Dajić | (Serbia) Aleksandar Petrović | (Brazil) Zé Carlos (Croatia) Antonio Franja (North Macedonia) Stevica Ristić |
| Pohang Steelers | (Brazil) Denílson | (North Macedonia) Stevica Ristić | | (Brazil) Clodoaldo |
| Seongnam Ilhwa Chunma | (Bolivia) Juan Carlos Arce | (Brazil) Dudu | (Brazil) Mota | |
| Suwon Samsung Bluewings | (Brazil) Edu | (Brazil) Lucas Pereira | (Croatia) Mato Neretljak | (Brazil) Luiz Henrique |
| Ulsan Hyundai | (Brazil) Almir | (Brazil) Brasília | (Brazil) Luizinho | (Brazil) Ferreira (Brazil) Pedrão |

== Regular season ==
=== League table ===
Top six teams qualified for the championship playoffs.

| Pos | Team | Pld | W | D | L | GF | GA | GD | Pts | Qualification |
|---|---|---|---|---|---|---|---|---|---|---|
| 1 | Suwon Samsung Bluewings | 26 | 17 | 3 | 6 | 46 | 24 | +22 | 54 | Qualification for the playoffs final |
| 2 | FC Seoul | 26 | 15 | 9 | 2 | 44 | 25 | +19 | 54 | Qualification for the playoffs semi-final |
| 3 | Seongnam Ilhwa Chunma | 26 | 15 | 6 | 5 | 45 | 21 | +24 | 51 | Qualification for the playoffs first round |
| 4 | Ulsan Hyundai | 26 | 14 | 7 | 5 | 39 | 26 | +13 | 49 | Qualification for the playoffs first round |
| 5 | Pohang Steelers | 26 | 13 | 5 | 8 | 43 | 34 | +9 | 44 | Qualification for the playoffs first round |
| 6 | Jeonbuk Hyundai Motors | 26 | 11 | 4 | 11 | 39 | 37 | +2 | 37 | Qualification for the playoffs first round |
| 7 | Incheon United | 26 | 9 | 9 | 8 | 29 | 30 | −1 | 36 | |
| 8 | Gyeongnam FC | 26 | 10 | 5 | 11 | 35 | 39 | −4 | 35 | |
| 9 | Jeonnam Dragons | 26 | 8 | 5 | 13 | 26 | 40 | −14 | 29 | |
| 10 | Jeju United | 26 | 7 | 7 | 12 | 23 | 31 | −8 | 28 | |
| 11 | Daegu FC | 26 | 8 | 2 | 16 | 46 | 58 | −12 | 26 | |
| 12 | Busan IPark | 26 | 5 | 7 | 14 | 30 | 39 | −9 | 22 | |
| 13 | Daejeon Citizen | 26 | 3 | 12 | 11 | 18 | 35 | −17 | 21 | |
| 14 | Gwangju Sangmu | 26 | 3 | 7 | 16 | 22 | 46 | −24 | 16 | |

Source: RSSSF (in English), K League (in Korean)
Rules for classification: 1) Points; 2) Goal difference; 3) Goals scored

=== Results ===
| Home \ Away | BIP | JND | DGU | DJC | SEO | GWJ | GNM | ICU | JJU | JHM | PHS | SIC | SSB | USH |
|---|---|---|---|---|---|---|---|---|---|---|---|---|---|---|
| Busan IPark | — | 2–0 | 0–4 | 1–2 | 2–0 | 0–0 | 0–1 | 2–2 | 3–0 | 2–1 | 1–2 | 1–3 | 0–2 | 1–1 |
| Jeonnam Dragons | 2–1 | — | 2–3 | 1–1 | 3–3 | 1–0 | 1–0 | 1–1 | 0–0 | 2–1 | 2–0 | 0–1 | 0–2 | 2–2 |
| Daegu FC | 3–2 | 1–2 | — | 1–1 | 1–2 | 3–2 | 1–4 | 2–4 | 2–4 | 1–3 | 1–4 | 0–1 | 1–2 | 3–1 |
| Daejeon Citizen | 2–2 | 0–1 | 0–0 | — | 1–1 | 0–0 | 1–2 | 0–0 | 0–2 | 2–0 | 0–3 | 1–2 | 1–0 | 2–2 |
| FC Seoul | 2–1 | 3–0 | 3–1 | 1–0 | — | 3–1 | 3–1 | 2–1 | 3–1 | 2–2 | 4–1 | 1–0 | 0–2 | 1–1 |
| Gwangju Sangmu | 0–2 | 3–1 | 1–4 | 0–0 | 0–1 | — | 2–0 | 0–1 | 1–0 | 2–3 | 1–1 | 1–1 | 2–5 | 1–2 |
| Gyeongnam FC | 1–0 | 2–1 | 4–2 | 2–2 | 1–1 | 1–1 | — | 2–1 | 1–1 | 1–0 | 3–4 | 3–4 | 0–1 | 1–0 |
| Incheon United | 2–2 | 1–0 | 0–2 | 2–1 | 2–2 | 3–0 | 0–0 | — | 0–0 | 0–0 | 2–1 | 0–2 | 1–3 | 0–3 |
| Jeju United | 1–1 | 1–0 | 3–2 | 0–0 | 0–0 | 3–1 | 0–2 | 0–2 | — | 0–1 | 0–1 | 0–3 | 3–1 | 0–1 |
| Jeonbuk Hyundai Motors | 2–1 | 2–1 | 0–3 | 3–1 | 1–2 | 2–1 | 3–1 | 0–1 | 2–1 | — | 1–1 | 1–2 | 1–2 | 1–2 |
| Pohang Steelers | 3–2 | 2–1 | 3–0 | 0–0 | 1–2 | 3–1 | 3–1 | 1–2 | 0–1 | 1–1 | — | 2–1 | 0–0 | 3–1 |
| Seongnam Ilhwa Chunma | 1–0 | 4–0 | 4–1 | 3–0 | 1–1 | 3–0 | 3–1 | 0–0 | 0–0 | 1–2 | 2–3 | — | 2–2 | 0–1 |
| Suwon Samsung Bluewings | 1–1 | 3–0 | 3–2 | 2–0 | 0–1 | 2–0 | 3–0 | 2–0 | 2–1 | 2–5 | 1–0 | 0–1 | — | 2–0 |
| Ulsan Hyundai | 1–0 | 1–2 | 3–2 | 4–0 | 0–0 | 1–1 | 1–0 | 2–1 | 2–1 | 2–1 | 3–0 | 0–0 | 2–1 | — |

Source: RSSSF
Legend: Blue = home team win; Yellow = draw; Red = away team win.

== Championship playoffs ==
=== Bracket ===
First round
3 | Seongnam Ilhwa Chunma | 1
6 | Jeonbuk Hyundai Motors (a.e.t.) | 2
4 | Ulsan Hyundai (p) | 0 (4)
5 | Pohang Steelers | 0 (2)

Second round
Ulsan Hyundai | 1
Jeonbuk Hyundai Motors | 0

Semifinal
2 | FC Seoul (a.e.t.) | 4
Ulsan Hyundai | 2

Final
1 | Suwon Samsung Bluewings | 1 | 2 | 3
FC Seoul | 1 | 1 | 2

=== Final table ===
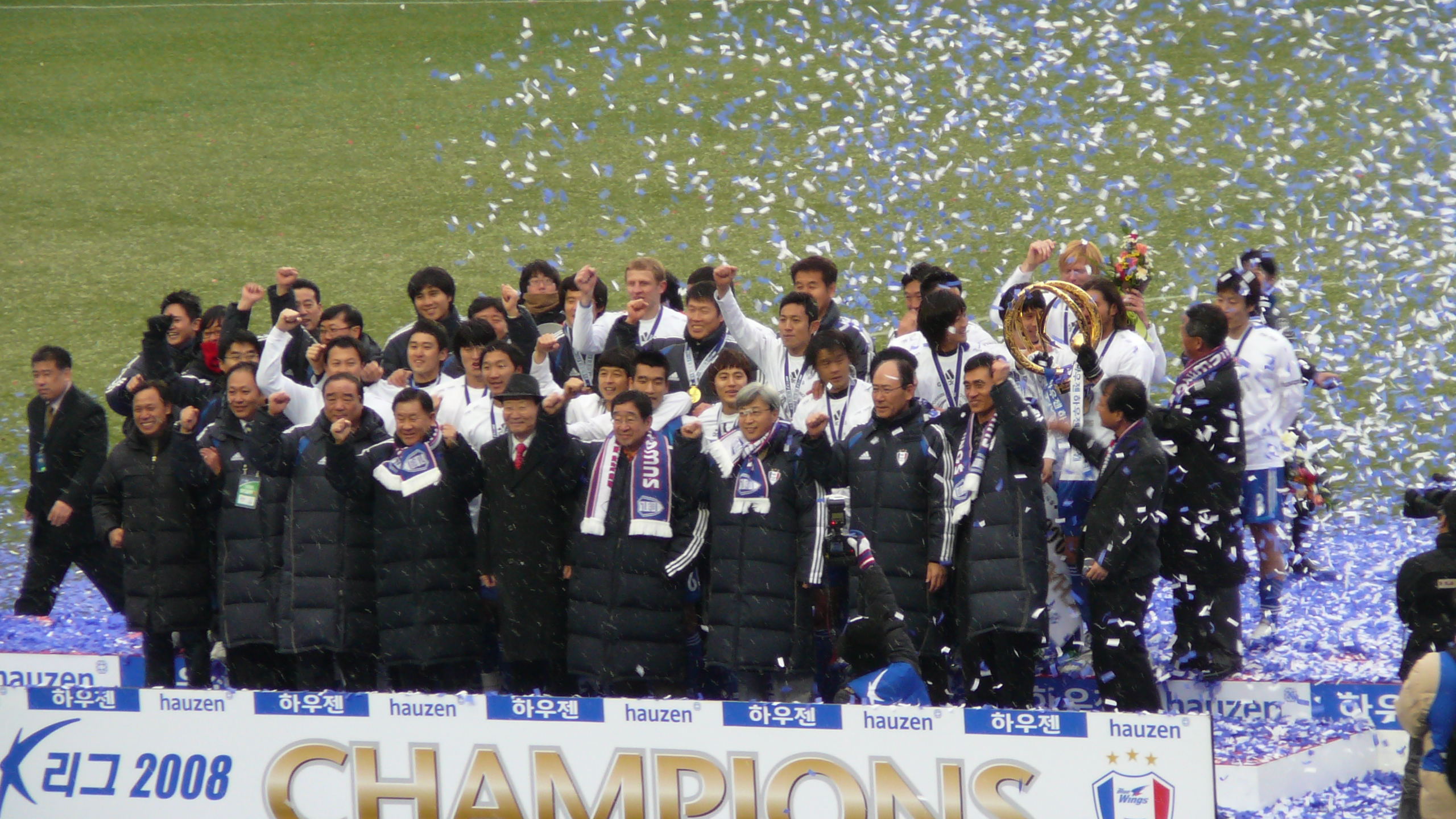
Suwon Samsung Bluewings celebrating winning the 2008 season.

| Pos | Team | Qualification |
|---|---|---|
| 1 | Suwon Samsung Bluewings (C) | Qualification for the Champions League |
| 2 | FC Seoul | Qualification for the Champions League |
| 3 | Ulsan Hyundai | Qualification for the Champions League |
| 4 | Jeonbuk Hyundai Motors | |
| 5 | Seongnam Ilhwa Chunma | |
| 6 | Pohang Steelers | Qualification for the Champions League (Note: Qualified as champions of the FA Cup.) |

Source: RSSSF
(C) Champions

== Top scorers ==
This list includes goals of the championship playoffs. The official top goalscorer was decided with records of only regular season, and Dudu won the award with 15 goals.

| Rank | Player | Club | Goals | Apps |
|---|---|---|---|---|
| 1 | (Brazil) Dudu | Seongnam Ilhwa Chunma | 16 | 27 |
| 2 | (Montenegro) Dejan Damjanović | FC Seoul | 15 | 29 |
| 3 | (Montenegro) Dženan Radončić | Incheon United | 13 | 26 |
| 3 | (Brazil) Edu | Suwon Samsung Bluewings | 13 | 27 |
| 5 | (South Korea) Lee Keun-ho | Daegu FC | 11 | 26 |
| 6 | (South Korea) Jang Nam-seok | Daegu FC | 10 | 24 |
| 7 | (Brazil) Luizinho | Ulsan Hyundai | 9 | 19 |
| 7 | (South Korea) Seo Dong-hyeon | Suwon Samsung Bluewings | 9 | 22 |
| 9 | (South Korea) Jung Jo-gook | FC Seoul | 8 | 14 |
| 9 | (Brazil) Eninho | Daegu FC | 8 | 19 |
| 9 | (Brazil) Adriano Chuva | Jeonnam Dragons | 8 | 19 |
| 9 | (Brazil) Rômulo Marques Macedo | Jeju United | 8 | 21 |
| 9 | (Brazil) Mota | Seongnam Ilhwa Chunma | 8 | 22 |
| 9 | (South Korea) Cho Jae-jin | Jeonbuk Hyundai Motors | 8 | 26 |

== Awards ==
=== Main awards ===
The K League Players' Player of the Year was published by Korean edition of FourFourTwo in summer, and was not an official award of the K League, but 124 players participated in the selection process.

| Award | Winner | Club |
|---|---|---|
| Most Valuable Player | (South Korea) Lee Woon-jae | Suwon Samsung Bluewings |
| Top goalscorer | (Brazil) Dudu | Seongnam Ilhwa Chunma |
| Top assist provider | (Brazil) Brasília | Ulsan Hyundai |
| Rookie of the Year | (South Korea) Lee Seung-yeoul | FC Seoul |
| Manager of the Year | (South Korea) Cha Bum-kun | Suwon Samsung Bluewings |
| Players' Player of the Year | (Brazil) Mota | Seongnam Ilhwa Chunma |

=== Best XI ===
| Position | Winner | Club |
|---|---|---|
| Goalkeeper | (South Korea) Lee Woon-jae | Suwon Samsung Bluewings |
| Defenders | (Brazil) Adilson | FC Seoul |
| Defenders | (Croatia) Mato Neretljak | Suwon Samsung Bluewings |
| Defenders | (South Korea) Park Dong-hyuk | Ulsan Hyundai |
| Defenders | (South Korea) Choi Hyo-jin | Pohang Steelers |
| Midfielders | (South Korea) Kim Hyeung-bum | Jeonbuk Hyundai Motors |
| Midfielders | (South Korea) Cho Won-hee | Suwon Samsung Bluewings |
| Midfielders | (South Korea) Ki Sung-yueng | FC Seoul |
| Midfielders | (South Korea) Lee Chung-yong | FC Seoul |
| Forwards | (South Korea) Lee Keun-ho | Daegu FC |
| Forwards | (Brazil) Edu | Suwon Samsung Bluewings |

== Attendance ==
The records were calculated for the regular season.

| Club | Matches | Total | Average |
|---|---|---|---|
| Suwon Samsung Bluewings | 13 | 309,623 | 23,817 |
| FC Seoul | 13 | 271,290 | 20,868 |
| Daegu FC | 13 | 221,623 | 17,048 |
| Daejeon Citizen | 13 | 188,892 | 14,530 |
| Incheon United | 13 | 175,023 | 13,463 |
| Jeonbuk Hyundai Motors | 13 | 166,625 | 12,817 |
| Gyeongnam FC | 13 | 153,853 | 11,835 |
| Pohang Steelers | 13 | 153,540 | 11,811 |
| Jeonnam Dragons | 13 | 150,156 | 11,550 |
| Ulsan Hyundai | 13 | 130,758 | 10,058 |
| Gwangju Sangmu FC | 13 | 128,630 | 9,895 |
| Busan IPark | 13 | 107,830 | 8,295 |
| Jeju United | 13 | 96,377 | 7,414 |
| Seongnam Ilhwa Chunma | 13 | 93,677 | 7,206 |
| Total | 182 | 2,347,897 | 12,901 |

== See also ==
- 2008 in South Korean football
- 2008 K League Championship
- 2008 Korean League Cup
- 2008 Korean FA Cup
