= Wellington Silva =

Wellington Silva may refer to:

- Wellington Silva (footballer, born 1987), Brazilian football forward
- Wellington Silva (footballer, born 1988), Brazilian football right-back
- Wellington Silva (footballer, born 1993), Brazilian football winger

== See also ==
- Wellington (footballer, born 1987), full name Wellington Carlos da Silva, Brazilian football striker
