= Kim Joo-won =

Kim Joo-won or Kim Ju-won may refer to:

- Kim Chu-wŏn, relative of King Hyegong of Silla
- Kim Joo-won (dancer) (born 1977), South Korean ballerina
- Kim Joo-won (footballer) (born 1991), South Korean footballer
- Kim Ju-won (baseball) (born 2002), South Korean baseball player
