= Yang Seung-won =

South Korean footballer (born 1985)

Yang Seung-Won
Personal information
- Full name: Yang Seung-Won
- Date of birth: 15 July 1985 (age 41)
- Place of birth: South Korea
- Height: 1.86 m (6 ft 1 in)
- Position: Defender

Team information
- Current team: Yongin City
- Number: 20

Youth career
- 2004–2007: Daegu University

Senior career*
Years	Team	Apps	(Gls)
2008–2011	Daegu FC	41	(1)
2013	Daegu FC	1	(0)
2014–	Yongin City		
- * Club domestic league appearances and goals as of 07 March 2014

- Yang Seung-won
- Hangul: 양승원
- Hanja: 梁勝源
- RR: Yang Seungwon
- MR: Yang Sŭngwŏn

Yang Seung-Won (Korean: 양승원; born 15 July 1985) is a South Korean football defender currently playing for Yongin City in the National League, the third tier of South Korean football.

== Club career ==
Yang joined Daegu FC from Daegu University for the 2008 season, and was initially handed the No. 30 jersey. After making only intermittent appearances (but scoring one goal) for the senior side in 2008, he was firmly established in the side for the 2009 season, playing 23 matches in all competitions. He remains with the club for the 2010 season.

He was summarily indicted in the 2011 South Korean football betting scandal and the K League suspended him for 2 years. In 2013, the K League reduced his disciplinary punishment and he returned to Daegu.

He joined National League side Yongin City ahead of the 2014 season.

== Club career statistics ==
As of 7 March 2014

Club performance			League		Cup		League Cup		Total	
Season	Club	League	Apps	Goals	Apps	Goals	Apps	Goals	Apps	Goals
South Korea			League		KFA Cup		League Cup		Total	
2008	Daegu FC	K-League	7	1	0	0	3	0	10	1
2009	Daegu FC	K-League	18	0	3	0	2	0	23	0
2010	Daegu FC	K-League	16	0	0	0	0	0	16	0
2011	Daegu FC	K-League	0	0	0	0	0	0	0	0
2013	Daegu FC	K-League	1	0	0	0	0	0	0	0
2014	Yongin City	National League	0	0	0	0	0	0	0	0
Career total			42	1	3	0	0	0	50	1
