= Jang Nam-seok =

South Korean footballer

Jang Nam-Seok
Personal information
- Full name: Jang Nam-Seok
- Date of birth: 18 April 1983 (age 43)
- Place of birth: Daegu, South Korea
- Height: 1.80 m (5 ft 11 in)
- Position: Forward

Youth career
- 2002–2005: Chung-Ang University

Senior career*
Years	Team	Apps	(Gls)
2006–2011	Daegu FC	92	(19)
2011	→ Sangju Sangmu (army)	15	(3)
- * Club domestic league appearances and goals as of 25 July 2011

- Jang Nam-seok
- Hangul: 장남석
- Hanja: 張南錫
- RR: Jang Namseok
- MR: Chang Namsŏk

Jang Nam-Seok (born 18 April 1983) is a South Korean former football forward.

== Club career ==
In 2006, Jang made his professional debut with Daegu FC, and finished as the top scorer in the Korean FA Cup that year. In 2008, Jang Nam-Seok, together with Lee Keun-Ho and Eninho, played a key role in the offense orientated tactics that was employed by Daegu FC that season. On 6 June 2008, he scored a goal within 40 seconds of kickoff in a home match against Ulsan Hyundai Horang-i. This set a 2008 season record for the quickest goal scored in a K-League match. He serves as captain of Daegu FC.

On 29 November 2010, he moved to Sangju Sangmu FC to fulfill his compulsory military duties. He is expected to return to Daegu FC upon completion of his two years service in the military.

== Club career statistics ==
As of 25 July 2011

Club performance			League		Cup		League Cup		Total	
Season	Club	League	Apps	Goals	Apps	Goals	Apps	Goals	Apps	Goals
South Korea			League		KFA Cup		League Cup		Total	
2006	Daegu FC	K-League	23	5	3	3	13	4	39	12
2007	Daegu FC	K-League	12	2	0	0	4	0	16	2
2008	Daegu FC	K-League	24	10	3	0	5	1	32	11
2009	Daegu FC	K-League	14	0	2	0	1	0	17	0
2010	Daegu FC	K-League	19	2	1	0	5	2	25	4
2011	Sangju Sangmu	K-League	15	3	2	0	1	0	18	3
Career total			107	22	11	3	29	7	147	32

== Honours ==
=== Individual ===
- Korean FA Cup Top Scorer: 2006

Sporting positions
Preceded by Hwang Sun-Pil	Daegu FC captain 2009	Succeeded by Bang Dae-Jong
