= Nam Hyun-seong =

South Korean football midfielder (born 1985)

Nam Hyun-Seong
Personal information
- Full name: Nam Hyun-Seong
- Date of birth: 6 May 1985 (age 41)
- Place of birth: South Korea
- Height: 1.77 m (5 ft 10 in)
- Position: Winger

Youth career
- 2004–2007: Sungkyunkwan University

Senior career*
Years	Team	Apps	(Gls)
2008–2009	Daegu FC	10	(0)
2009–2010	FC Banik Ostrava	1	(0)
2010	Daegu FC	0	(0)
- * Club domestic league appearances and goals as of 1 August 2010

- Nam Hyun-seong
- Hangul: 남현성
- Hanja: 南縣成
- RR: Nam Hyeonseong
- MR: Nam Hyŏnsŏng

Nam Hyun-Seong (Korean: 남현성; born 6 May 1985) is a South Korean football midfielder.

== Club career ==
Nam joined Daegu FC from his youth club Sungkyunkwan University as a draftee for the 2008 season, and would make just four appearances in the senior side that season. He gained more matchplay in the 2009 season, playing in eight K-League matches up until the mid-season break. On 1 July 2009, Nam transferred to Czech Republic club FC Banik Ostrava, who play in the Gambrinus liga, the Czech Republic's premier league.

Nam made his first start for his new club on 8 August 2009, coming on as a 90th-minute substitute in a match against Viktoria Plzen. However, this proved to be his only match in his one-year stint with FC Banik. During the 2010 K-League mid-season break, Nam returned to Daegu FC.

== Club career statistics ==
As of 16 February 2011

Club performance			League		Cup		League Cup		Total	
Season	Club	League	Apps	Goals	Apps	Goals	Apps	Goals	Apps	Goals
South Korea			League		KFA Cup		League Cup		Total	
2008	Daegu FC	K-League	2	0	0	0	2	0	4	0
2009	Daegu FC	K-League	8	0	0	0	2	0	10	0
2010	Daegu FC	K-League	0	0	0	0	0	0	0	0
Czech Republic			League		Czech Cup		League Cup		Total	
2009-10	FC Banik Ostrava	Gambrinus liga	1	0	0	0	0	0	1	0
Career total			11	0	0	0	4	0	15	0
