= Alexsandro (footballer, born 1980) =

Brazilian footballer

Personal information
- Full name: Alexsandro Ribeiro da Silva
- Date of birth: April 16, 1980 (age 46)
- Place of birth: Maceió, Brazil
- Height: 1.81 m (5 ft 11 in)
- Position: Forward

Senior career*
Years	Team	Apps	(Gls)
2006–2007	Associação Atlética Coruripe	59	(35)
2008	Daegu FC	8	(0)
2010	CSA		
2010	Nanchang Bayi	15	(3)
2011	Murici		
2011	→ ASA (loan)	21	(6)
2012–	Mogi Mirim		
- * Club domestic league appearances and goals as of 6 November 2011

Alexsandro Ribeiro da Silva (born April 16, 1980) is a Brazilian football forward who plays for Brazilian side Mogi Mirim Esporte Clube.

He played for several clubs, including Associação Atlética Coruripe, South Korean League side Daegu FC and Chinese Super League side Nanchang Bayi.

Alexsandro previously played for Centro Sportivo Alagoano in the Copa do Brasil.
