= 2008 Korean League Cup =

2008 Samsung Hauzen Cup
Tournament details
- Country: South Korea
- Dates: 19 March – 22 October 2008
- Teams: 14

Final positions
- Champions: Suwon Samsung Bluewings (6th title)
- Runners-up: Jeonnam Dragons

Tournament statistics
- Top goal scorer: Eninho (9 goals)

The 2008 Korean League Cup, also known as the 2008 Samsung Hauzen Cup, was the 21st competition of the Korean League Cup.

== Group stage ==
=== Group A ===
Pos	Team	Pld	W	D	L	GF	GA	GD	Pts
1	Suwon Samsung Bluewings	10	6	3	1	14	4	+10	21
2	Busan IPark	10	5	1	4	9	10	−1	16
3	FC Seoul	10	4	2	4	9	10	−1	14
4	Gyeongnam FC	10	3	4	3	12	12	0	13
5	Jeju United	10	2	3	5	10	11	−1	9
6	Incheon United	10	2	3	5	4	11	−7	9

Source: RSSSF

=== Group B ===
Pos	Team	Pld	W	D	L	GF	GA	GD	Pts
1	Jeonbuk Hyundai Motors	10	5	4	1	17	8	+9	19
2	Seongnam Ilhwa Chunma	10	6	1	3	13	10	+3	19
3	Ulsan Hyundai	10	4	4	2	12	10	+2	16
4	Daejeon Citizen	10	4	2	4	15	14	+1	14
5	Daegu FC	10	3	2	5	16	19	−3	11
6	Gwangju Sangmu	10	0	3	7	5	17	−12	3

Source: RSSSF

== Knockout stage ==
Quarter-finals
L	Pohang Steelers	1
B2	Seongnam Ilhwa Chunma	0
FA	Jeonnam Dragons	3
A2	Busan IPark	2

Semi-finals
A1	Suwon Samsung Bluewings (p)	0 (3)
QF	Pohang Steelers	0 (2)
B1	Jeonbuk Hyundai Motors	1
QF	Jeonnam Dragons	3

Final
SF	Suwon Samsung Bluewings	2
SF	Jeonnam Dragons	0

== Top scorers ==
Rank	Player	Club	Goals	Apps
1	(Brazil) Eninho	Daegu FC	9	8
2	(Brazil) Índio	Gyeongnam FC	4	6
2	(South Korea) Shim Young-sung	Jeju United	4	7
2	(South Korea) Seo Dong-hyeon	Suwon Samsung Bluewings	4	12
5	(Brazil) Selmir	Daejeon Citizen	3	2
5	(Bosnia and Herzegovina) Jusuf Dajić	Jeonbuk Hyundai Motors	3	4
5	(South Korea) Gong Oh-kyun	Gyeongnam FC	3	5
5	(North Macedonia) Stevica Ristić	Pohang Steelers	3	6
5	(South Korea) Choi Sung-kuk	Seongnam Ilhwa Chunma	3	8
5	(South Korea) Kim Dong-hyun	Seongnam Ilhwa Chunma	3	9
5	(South Korea) Jeong Shung-hoon	Busan IPark	3	9
5	(Brazil) Edu	Suwon Samsung Bluewings	3	11

== Awards ==
Award	Player	Team	Points
Top goalscorer	(Brazil) Eninho	Daegu FC	9 goals
Top assist provider	(South Korea) Byun Sung-hwan	Jeju United	3 assists

== See also ==
- 2008 in South Korean football
- 2008 K League
- 2008 Korean FA Cup
