= Lee Hyeon-seong =

South Korean footballer

Personal information
- Full name: Lee Hyeon-seong
- Date of birth: 20 May 1993 (age 33)
- Place of birth: South Korea
- Height: 1.72 m (5 ft 8 in)
- Positions: Midfielder; forward

Team information
- Current team: Seoul E-Land
- Number: 7

Youth career
- 2013–2015: Yong In University

Senior career*
Years	Team	Apps	(Gls)
2016	Incheon United	9	(0)
2017–2018	Gyeongnam FC	14	(0)
2018–	Seoul E-Land	21	(1)

International career
2012	South Korea U20	3	(0)
2015	South Korea U23	4	(0)
- * Club domestic league appearances and goals as of 30 November 2018

Lee Hyeon-seong (Korean: 이현성; born 20 May 1993) is a South Korean footballer who plays for Seoul E-Land.

== Career ==
Lee Hyeon-seong joined Incheon United on 17 January 2017. He moved to Gyeongnam FC before the 2017 season starts.
