= Kim Joo-won (footballer) =

South Korean footballer (born 1991)

Personal information
- Date of birth: July 29, 1991 (age 35)
- Place of birth: South Korea
- Height: 1.85 m (6 ft 1 in)
- Position: Defender

Team information
- Current team: Seongnam FC
- Number: 66

Youth career
- 2007–2009: Pohang Jecheol Technical High School
- 2010–2012: Yeungnam University

Senior career*
Years	Team	Apps	(Gls)
2013–2016	Pohang Steelers	57	(3)
2017–2020	Jeonnam Dragons	51	(1)
2018–2019	→ Asan Mugunghwa	16	(0)
2021–2023	Jeju United	14	(0)
2023	Suwon Samsung Bluewings	17	(0)
2024–2025	Seongnam FC	51	(1)
2026–	Daegu FC	5	(0)
Korean name
Hangul	김주원
RR	Gim Juwon
MR	Kim Chuwŏn
Former name
Hangul	김준수
Hanja	金俊洙
RR	Gim Junsu
MR	Kim Chunsu
- * Club domestic league appearances and goals as of 18 May 2026

Kim Joo-won (Korean: 김주원); formerly Kim Jun-su (김준수; born July 29, 1991) is a South Korean footballer who plays for Daegu FC in K League 2.
