= Jeon Sang-dae =

South Korean footballer

Jeon Sang-Dae
Personal information
- Full name: Jeon Sang-Dae
- Date of birth: April 10, 1982 (age 44)
- Place of birth: South Korea
- Height: 1.84 m (6 ft 0 in)
- Position: Forward

Youth career
- Soongsil University

Senior career*
Years	Team	Apps	(Gls)
2004–2005	Ulsan Hyundai Mipo Dockyard		
2006	Gyeongnam FC	2	(0)
2007–2008	Daegu FC	0	(0)
- * Club domestic league appearances and goals as of 6 October 2008

Jeon Sang-Dae (Korean: 전상대; born April 10, 1982) is a South Korean football player who has played as a forward.

His previous club is Gyeongnam FC and Daegu FC.

== Club career ==
- 2004-2005 Ulsan Hyundai Mipo Dockyard
- 2006 Gyeongnam FC
- 2007-2008 Daegu FC
