= Walter Minhoca =

Brazilian footballer

Personal information
- Full name: Walter Junio da Silva Clementino
- Date of birth: January 12, 1982 (age 44)
- Place of birth: Betim, Brazil
- Height: 1.73 m (5 ft 8 in)
- Position: Attacking midfielder

Team information
- Current team: CRB

Youth career
- 1998–2001: Cruzeiro

Senior career*
Years	Team	Apps	(Gls)
2002–2008	Cruzeiro		
2002	→ Caxias (Loan)		
2002–2003	→ Ipatinga (Loan)		
2003	→ Avaí (Loan)		
2004	→ Ipatinga (Loan)		
2004	→ América-MG (Loan)		
2005	→ Ipatinga (Loan)		
2005–2006	→ Marítimo (Loan)		
2006	→ Ipatinga (Loan)		
2006	→ Flamengo (Loan)		
2007	→ Ipatinga (Loan)		
2008	Al-Qadisiya		
2008	→ Daejeon Citizen (Loan)	7	(0)
2009	Botafogo-SP		
2009–2010	Guarani	31	(6)
2010	Ipatinga	24	(2)
2011	São Caetano	2	(0)
2012	Guarani-MG		
2012	Brasiliense	5	(0)
2012–2013	ABC	13	(1)
2013–	CRB		
- * Club domestic league appearances and goals

Walter Junio da Silva Clementino or simply Walter Minhoca (born January 12, 1982, in Betim), is a Brazilian attacking midfielder who currently plays for Clube de Regatas Brasil.

== Honours ==
Flamengo

- Brazilian Cup: 2006

== Contract ==
- Ipatinga (Loan) 1 January 2007 to 31 January 2007
- Cruzeiro 1 July 2005 to 30 June 2010
