= Rômulo (footballer, born 1980) =

Brazilian footballer

Personal information
- Full name: Rômulo Marques Macedo
- Date of birth: April 3, 1980 (age 46)
- Place of birth: Bom Jesus do Itabapoana, Rio de Janeiro, Brazil
- Height: 1.72 m (5 ft 8 in)
- Position: Midfielder

Senior career*
Years	Team	Apps	(Gls)
2001	Rio Branco AC		
2001–2002	Criciúma EC		
2002	Clube do Remo		
2003	Criciúma EC	11	(1)
2004	Clube do Remo		
2005	Petro Atlético		
2006	Primeiro de Agosto		
2007	Petro Atlético		
2008	Jeju United	21	(8)
2009–2010	Busan I'Park	21	(4)
2011	Henan Construction	5	(0)
- * Club domestic league appearances and goals as of 4 November 2011

Rômulo Marques Macedo (born April 3, 1980), better known as Rômulo, is a Brazilian footballer who plays as a forward.

His previous clubs include K-League sides Jeju United & Busan I'Park, Chinese Super League side Henan Construction, Primeiro de Agosto & Petro Atlético in Angola, Clube do Remo, Criciúma, Rio Branco, Flamengo and Vasco da Gama.

== Club career ==
- 2001 Rio Branco AC
- 2001–2002 Criciúma EC
- 2002 Clube do Remo
- 2003 Criciúma EC
- 2004 Clube do Remo
- 2005 Petro Atlético
- 2006 Primeiro de Agosto
- 2007 Petro Atlético
- 2008 Jeju United
- 2009–2010 Busan I'Park
- 2011 Henan Construction

== Honors ==
- Campeonato Paraense in 2004 with Clube do Remo
- Girabola champion in 2006 with Primeiro de Agosto
- Angolan Cup winner in 2006 with Primeiro de Agosto
