= Jang Sang-won =

South Korean footballer

Jang Sang-Won
Personal information
- Full name: Jang Sang-Won
- Date of birth: 30 September 1977 (age 49)
- Place of birth: South Korea
- Height: 1.85 m (6 ft 1 in)
- Position: Midfielder

Youth career
- 1999–2002: Jeonju University

Senior career*
| Years | Team | Apps | (Gls) |
| 2003–2007 | Ulsan Hyundai | 61 | (4) |
| 2008–2009 | Daegu FC | 8 | (0) |
- * Club domestic league appearances and goals as of 2 May 2009

Jang Sang-Won (Korean: 장상원; born September 30, 1977) is a South Korean football player. His previous club is Ulsan Hyundai, Daegu FC.
