= Bang Dae-jong =

South Korean footballer

Bang Dae-Jong 방대종
Personal information
- Full name: Bang Dae-Jong
- Date of birth: 28 January 1985 (age 41)
- Place of birth: South Korea
- Height: 1.84 m (6 ft 0 in)
- Position: Defender

Team information
- Current team: FC Anyang
- Number: 15

Youth career
- 2004–2007: Dong-A University

Senior career*
Years	Team	Apps	(Gls)
2008–2010	Daegu FC	44	(2)
2011–2016	Jeonnam Dragons	77	(1)
2012–2013	→ Sangju Sangmu (military service)	34	(3)
2017–	FC Anyang	14	(1)
- * Club domestic league appearances and goals as of 2 January 2018

Bang Dae-Jong (Korean: 방대종; born 28 January 1985) is a South Korean football defender. He currently plays for the FC Anyang in the K League 2, having previously played for Daegu FC.

== Club career ==
Bang is a draftee from Dong-A University, joining Daegu FC for the 2008 season. Making only intermittent appearances during 2008, he was more successful during the 2009 season, playing most of the games of the regular K-League season. He was made captain of the senior squad for the 2010 season. On 4 January 2011, Bang transferred to Chunnam Dragons.

== Club career statistics ==
As of 14 January 2011

Club performance			League		Cup		League Cup		Total	
Season	Club	League	Apps	Goals	Apps	Goals	Apps	Goals	Apps	Goals
South Korea			League		KFA Cup		League Cup		Total	
2008	Daegu F.C.	K-League	3	0	1	0	4	0	8	0
2009	Daegu F.C.	K-League	20	2	2	0	5	0	27	2
2010	Daegu F.C.	K-League	21	0	1	0	2	0	24	0
2011	Chunnam Dragons	K-League	10	0	2	0	4	0	16	0
Career total			54	2	6	0	15	0	75	2

Sporting positions
Preceded by Jang Nam-Seok	Daegu FC captain 2010	Succeeded by Back Min-Chul
