= Geovane (footballer, born 1985) =

Brazilian footballer

Personal information
- Full name: José Thomaz Geovane de Oliveira
- Date of birth: 5 August 1985 (age 41)
- Place of birth: Vitória de Santo Antão, Brazil
- Height: 1.71 m (5 ft 7 in)
- Position: Forward

Team information
- Current team: Vitória das Tabocas

Senior career*
Years	Team	Apps	(Gls)
2005	Salgueiro		
2006–2008	América-RN		
2008	Daegu F.C.	10	(3)
2009	América-RN		
2009	Vera Cruz		
2009	América-RN	10	(2)
2010–2012	Mogi Mirim		
2010	→ Grêmio Prudente (loan)	2	(0)
2010	→ Guarani (loan)	19	(2)
2011–2012	→ São Caetano (loan)	27	(7)
2012	São Caetano	32	(3)
2018	Vitória das Tabocas		
- * Club domestic league appearances and goals as of 2 July 2013

José Thomaz Geovane de Oliveira (born 5 August 1985), known as just Geovane, is a Brazilian football forward, who plays for São Caetano.

His previous club is Daegu FC in South Korea, América de Natal and Salgueiro. During the 2010 season, he also played for Grêmio Prudente and Guarani in the Brazilian Série A.
