= Wellington Silva (footballer, born 1987) =

Brazilian footballer

Personal information
- Full name: Wellington da Silva de Souza
- Date of birth: 27 May 1987 (age 39)
- Place of birth: Marília, Brazil
- Height: 1.89 m (6 ft 2 in)
- Position: Forward

Team information
- Current team: Paraná

Senior career*
Years	Team	Apps	(Gls)
2006–2008	Marília	27	(8)
2008	→ Gyeongnam FC (loan)	4	(0)
2008	→ Tokushima Vortis (loan)	17	(2)
2009–	Paraná	54	(12)
2010	→ América-RN (loan)	6	(1)
2011	→ Remo (loan)	15	(5)
2011	→ Anápolis (loan)	7	(3)
2012	→ Oeste (loan)	21	(4)
- * Club domestic league appearances and goals as of 17 December 2011

Wellington da Silva de Souza (born 27 May 1987), sometimes known as just Souza, is a Brazilian football striker who currently plays for Oeste Futebol Clube. He played for Gyeongnam FC in the South Korea and J2 League side Tokushima Vortis.
