= Yoon Soung-min =

South Korean footballer

Yoon Soung-Min
Personal information
- Full name: Yoon Soung-Min
- Date of birth: May 22, 1985 (age 41)
- Place of birth: South Korea
- Height: 1.77 m (5 ft 9 1/2 in)
- Position: Midfielder

Senior career*
Years	Team	Apps	(Gls)
2004–2005	Gänclärbirliyi Sumqayit	12	(0)
2010–2011	Persijap Jepara	8	(1)
- * Club domestic league appearances and goals as of 27 February 2017

- Yoon Soung-min
- Hangul: 윤성민
- RR: Yun Seongmin
- MR: Yun Sŏngmin

Yoon Soung-Min (born May 22, 1985 in South Korea) is a South Korean former footballer who plays as a midfielder.

== Career statistics ==
As of match played 7 May 2011

Appearances and goals by club, season and competition
Club	Season	League			National Cup		Continental		Other		Total	
Club	Season	Division	Apps	Goals	Apps	Goals	Apps	Goals	Apps	Goals	Apps	Goals
Gänclärbirliyi Sumqayit	2004–05	Azerbaijan Top League	12	0			–		–		12	0
Persijap Jepara	2010–11	Indonesia Super League	8	1			–		–		8	1
Career total			20	1			-	-	-	-	20	1
