= Hwang Sun-pil =

South Korean footballer

Hwang Sun-Pil
Personal information
- Full name: Hwang Sun-Pil
- Date of birth: 14 July 1981 (age 45)
- Place of birth: South Korea
- Height: 1.81 m (5 ft 11 in)
- Position: Defender

Youth career
- 2000–2003: Chung-Ang University

Senior career*
Years	Team	Apps	(Gls)
2004–2010	Daegu FC	73	(3)
2009–2010	→ Gwangju Sangmu (loan)	17	(0)
2011	Chunnam Dragons	0	(0)
2012	Busan IPark	1	(0)
- * Club domestic league appearances and goals as of 17 December 2012

Hwang Sun-Pil (Korean: 황선필; born 14 July 1981) is a South Korean football defender, who last played for Busan IPark in the K-League.

Hwang's professional career began with Daegu FC. In December 2008, he joined Gwangju Sangmu for military service. On 4 January 2011, Hwang transferred to the Chunnam Dragons. On 20 January 2012, he moved to Busan I'Park.

Sporting positions
Preceded by Kim Hyun-Soo	Daegu FC captain 2008	Succeeded by Jang Nam-Seok
