= Lee Keun-ho (footballer, born 1985) =

South Korean footballer (born 1985)

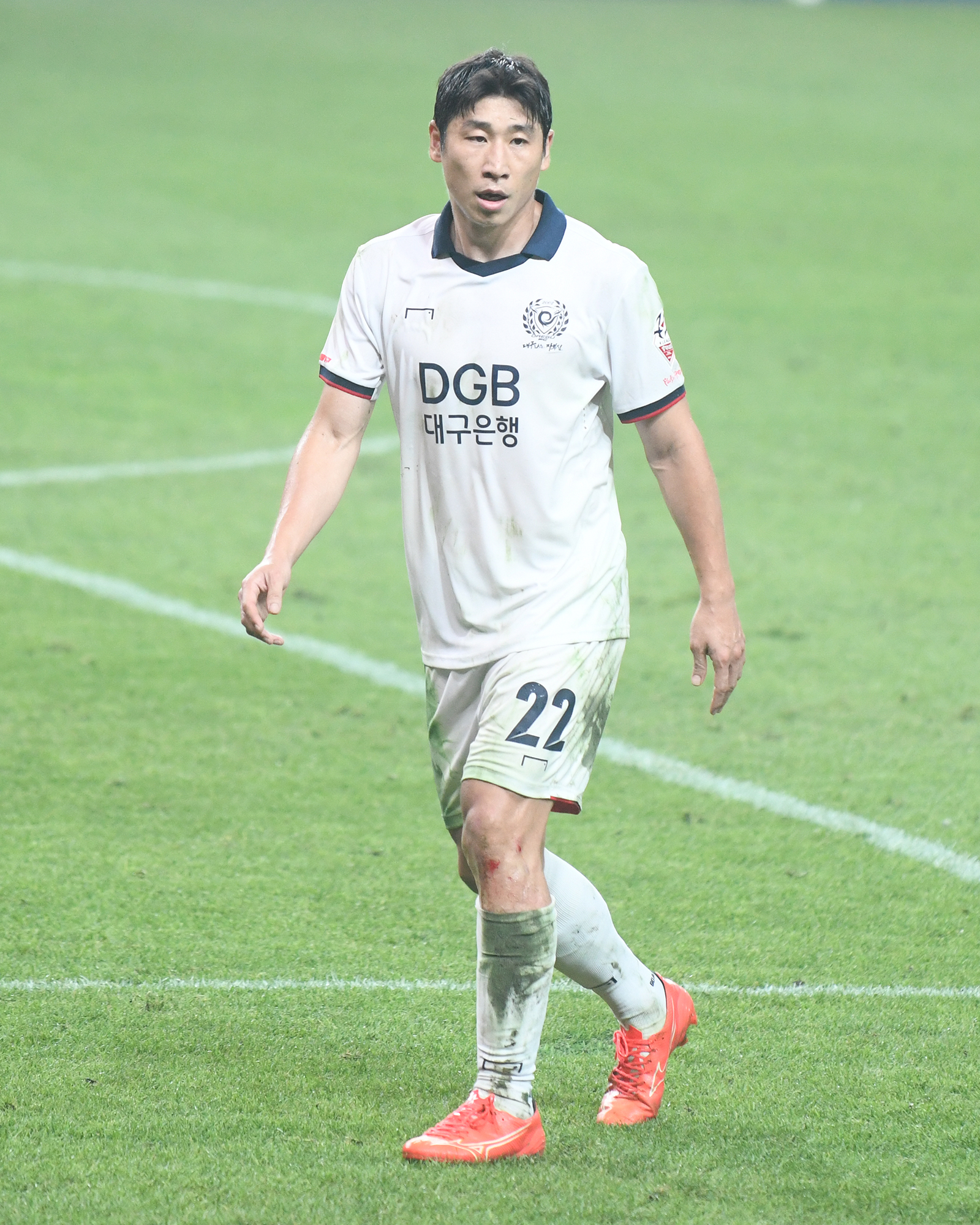
- Lee with Daegu in 2023

Personal information
- Full name: Lee Keun-ho
- Date of birth: 11 April 1985 (age 41)
- Place of birth: Incheon, South Korea
- Height: 1.76 m (5 ft 9 in)
- Position: Forward

Youth career
- 2004–2006: Incheon United

Senior career*
Years	Team	Apps	(Gls)
2004–2006	Incheon United	2	(0)
2007–2008	Daegu FC	46	(19)
2009–2010	Júbilo Iwata	36	(13)
2010–2011	Gamba Osaka	52	(19)
2012–2014	Ulsan Hyundai	33	(8)
2013–2014	→ Sangju Sangmu (draft)	43	(19)
2014–2016	El Jaish	18	(2)
2015	→ Jeonbuk Hyundai Motors (loan)	15	(4)
2016	Jeju United	35	(5)
2017–2018	Gangwon FC	50	(8)
2018–2022	Ulsan Hyundai	52	(6)
2021	→ Daegu FC (loan)	30	(3)
2022–2023	Daegu FC	63	(4)
Total		475	(110)

International career^{‡}
2003–2005	South Korea U20	9	(3)
2006–2008	South Korea U23	19	(5)
2007–2018	South Korea	84	(19)
Medal record
Representing South Korea
Men's football
AFC Asian Cup
Silver medal – second place	2015 Australia	Team
Bronze medal – third place	2007 Indonesia/Malaysia/ Thailand/Vietnam	Team
EAFF Championship
Gold medal – first place	2008 China	Team
Gold medal – first place	2017 Japan	Team
- * Club domestic league appearances and goals as of 3 December 2023 ‡ National team caps and goals as of 3 February 2018

- Lee Keun-ho
- Hangul: 이근호
- Hanja: 李根鎬
- RR: I Geunho
- MR: I Kŭnho

Lee Keun-ho (Korean: 이근호; born 11 April 1985) is a South Korean former footballer who played as a forward. His pace, work-rate, and link-up plays mark him as a highly rated forward in Asia. A South Korean international from 2007 to 2014, he scored 19 goals in 84 caps for the national team. He represented his country in the 2014 FIFA World Cup.

== Club career ==
After graduating from Bupyeong High School, Lee joined local side Incheon United in 2004. He stayed in Incheon's reserve team for three years, but got a chance to play for a K League club after winning the Best Player award in the R League contested between reserve teams. Daegu FC signed him at the beginning of 2007 season.

Daegu FC manager Byun Byung-joo brought the fast and extremely aggressive "bullet football" tactic to his team. bringin Lee into the spotlight. He became the top scorer among South Korean players in 2007 and 2008 K League.

Lee wanted to leave for Europe after the end of the contract with Daegu in December 2008. Several European clubs showed their interest in him, and he was offered a trial from Premier League club Blackburn Rovers. However, he turned it down because he worried about the hard competition for a starting position in Blackburn. He signed for J1 League club Júbilo Iwata on a nine-month contract in April 2009. He tried to move to Ligue 1 club Paris Saint-Germain in June after playing for Júbilo Iwata for two months, but failed to negotiate with Paris. He finally signed a contract extension with Júbilo Iwata until July 2010.

Lee joined Gamba Osaka in June 2010. He scored 15 goals while playing 32 matches for Gamba in the 2011 J1 League.

On 10 January 2012, he returned to South Korea, signing for Ulsan Hyundai on a three-year deal. During a year in Ulsan, he led his team to the AFC Champions League title, winning the Asian Footballer of the Year award and the Champions League MVP award. The next year, he was transferred to Sangju Sangmu to perform his military service as per South Korean law.

== International career ==
Lee was selected for the 2005 FIFA World Youth Championship in Netherlands. However, for most matches, he remained in the bench, not playing a single match in the group stage, while his team-mate Park Chu-young made good impressions. He was confirmed in the Summer Olympics squad in 2006, and became the most valuable player in the squad to qualify for the Olympic games. He was selected for the 2007 AFC Asian Cup, and also capped for the South Korea under-23 team in qualification for the 2008 Summer Olympics.

On 29 June 2007, Lee made his senior team debut in a friendly against Iraq through substitution in the second half. Lee also managed to score his debut goal from an assist made by Lee Chun-soo. On 15 October 2008, Lee scored two goals in a qualification match of the 2010 FIFA World Cup against United Arab Emirates. On 19 November 2008, Lee scored the most important goal in his international career yet in an away game against Saudi Arabia, which ended South Korea's nineteen-year losing spell against the Saudis. Although he played in most of the qualification campaign, he was not named for the team to participate in the 2010 World Cup.

Lee was included in South Korea's squad for the 2014 FIFA World Cup by showing good performances with three goals in the final round of the qualification. In their first group stage match against Russia on 17 June 2014, he came on as a substitute for Park Chu-young in the 52nd minute and scored his first ever World Cup goal in a 1–1 draw when his shot from outside the box was spilled by goalkeeper Igor Akinfeev over his head and over the line. He also assisted Koo Ja-cheol's goal in the second match against Algeria.

== Personal life ==
Lee was born in Incheon, South Korea. He is well known for his friendship with Ha Dae-sung. Having played together in elementary, middle, and high school, they also played together at Daegu FC. His older brother Lee Won-ho is coaching a local side in Incheon.

Lee is the inaugural president of FIFPro Korea, South Korea's official players' union, since it gained Candidate Member status.

He has been supporting a former football player who suffered a heart attack during a match in 2011.

In 2015, he was appointed as the promotional ambassador of the Purme Foundation, which helps disabled children in their path of rehabilitation and is based in Gangneung. During his fellowship with the association, he organized several charity football matches and clinics to help the child patients by providing them with scholarships and appropriate equipment. In 2017, he also donated a correspondent of ₩100 million (about $90,200) to the foundation.

Following the forest wildfire that brought severe damages all over the Gangwon Province in 2019, Lee offered financial support to help the process of recover and rebuilding. He also made donations to the local health services in order to help fight the COVID-19 pandemic.

Thanks to his leading attitude both on and off the pitch and his charity activities, Lee was nominated for the 2020 FIFPro Merit Awards, three special prizes assigned to the footballers who distinguished themselves the most for their impact out of the playing field and their activism.

== Career statistics ==
=== Club ===
As of 3 December 2023

Appearances and goals by club, season and competition
Club	Season	League			National cup		League cup		Continental		Other		Total	
Club	Season	Division	Apps	Goals	Apps	Goals	Apps	Goals	Apps	Goals	Apps	Goals	Apps	Goals
Incheon United	2004	K League	0	0	1	0	0	0	—		—		1	0
Incheon United	2005	K League	0	0	1	0	5	0	—		—		6	0
Incheon United	2006	K League	2	0	0	0	1	0	—		—		3	0
Incheon United	Total		2	0	2	0	6	0	—		—		10	0
Daegu FC	2007	K League	20	8	2	0	7	2	—		—		29	10
Daegu FC	2008	K League	26	11	3	2	6	2	—		—		35	15
Daegu FC	Total		46	19	5	2	13	4	—		—		64	25
Júbilo Iwata	2009	J1 League	24	12	1	1	1	0	—		—		26	13
Júbilo Iwata	2010	J1 League	12	1	0	0	4	1	—		—		16	2
Júbilo Iwata	Total		36	13	1	1	5	1	—		—		42	15
Gamba Osaka	2010	J1 League	20	4	5	1	0	0	—		—		25	5
Gamba Osaka	2011	J1 League	32	15	1	0	0	0	7	2	—		40	17
Gamba Osaka	Total		52	19	6	1	0	0	7	2	—		65	22
Ulsan Hyundai	2012	K League	33	8	2	1	—		12	4	2 (Note: Appearances in FIFA Club World Cup)	1	49	14
Sangju Sangmu (draft)	2013	K League 2	25	15	2	0	—		—		2 (Note: Appearances in K League promotion-relegation playoffs)	0	29	15
Sangju Sangmu (draft)	2014	K League 1	18	4	0	0	—		—		—		18	4
Sangju Sangmu (draft)	Total		43	19	2	0	—		—		2	0	47	19
El Jaish	2014–15	Qatar Stars League	18	2	3	0	—		2	0	—		23	2
Jeonbuk Hyundai Motors (loan)	2015	K League 1	15	4	—		—		2	0	—		17	4
Jeju United	2016	K League 1	35	5	1	0	—		—		—		36	5
Gangwon FC	2017	K League 1	37	8	2	0	—		—		—		39	8
Gangwon FC	2018	K League 1	13	0	0	0	—		—		—		13	0
Gangwon FC	Total		50	8	2	0	—		—		—		52	8
Ulsan Hyundai	2018	K League 1	22	4	5	1	—		—		—		27	5
Ulsan Hyundai	2019	K League 1	18	2	0	0	—		3	0	—		21	2
Ulsan Hyundai	2020	K League 1	12	0	3	0	—		8	0	—		23	0
Ulsan Hyundai	Total		52	6	8	1	—		11	0	—		71	7
Daegu FC (loan)	2021	K League 1	30	3	5	0	—		7	1	—		42	4
Daegu FC	2022	K League 1	31	2	2	0	—		8	3	—		41	5
Daegu FC	2023	K League 1	32	2	2	1	—		—		—		34	3
Daegu FC	Total		63	4	4	1	—		8	3	—		75	8
Career total			475	110	41	7	24	5	49	10	4	1	593	133

=== International ===
Appearances and goals by national team and year
National team	Year	Apps	Goals
South Korea	2007	3	1
South Korea	2008	11	5
South Korea	2009	13	2
South Korea	2010	5	0
South Korea	2011	7	2
South Korea	2012	8	5
South Korea	2013	11	3
South Korea	2014	12	1
South Korea	2015	5	0
South Korea	2017	6	0
South Korea	2018	3	0
Career total		84	19

List of international goals scored by Lee Keun-ho
No.	Date	Venue	Opponent	Score	Result	Competition
1	29 June 2007	Seogwipo, South Korea	Iraq	3–0	3–0	Friendly
2	11 October 2008	Suwon, South Korea	Uzbekistan	2–0	3–0	Friendly
3	11 October 2008	Suwon, South Korea	Uzbekistan	3–0	3–0	Friendly
4	15 October 2008	Seoul, South Korea	United Arab Emirates	1–0	4–1	2010 FIFA World Cup qualification
5	15 October 2008	Seoul, South Korea	United Arab Emirates	3–1	4–1	2010 FIFA World Cup qualification
6	19 November 2008	Riyadh, Saudi Arabia	Saudi Arabia	1–0	2–0	2010 FIFA World Cup qualification
7	4 February 2009	Dubai, United Arab Emirates	Bahrain	2–2	2–2	Friendly
8	28 March 2009	Suwon, South Korea	Iraq	2–1	2–1	Friendly
9	25 March 2011	Seoul, South Korea	Honduras	4–0	4–0	Friendly
10	11 November 2011	Dubai, United Arab Emirates	United Arab Emirates	1–0	2–0	2014 FIFA World Cup qualification
11	29 February 2012	Seoul, South Korea	Kuwait	2–0	2–0	2014 FIFA World Cup qualification
12	8 June 2012	Doha, Qatar	Qatar	1–1	4–1	2014 FIFA World Cup qualification
13	8 June 2012	Doha, Qatar	Qatar	4–1	4–1	2014 FIFA World Cup qualification
14	15 August 2012	Anyang, South Korea	Zambia	1–0	2–1	Friendly
15	15 August 2012	Anyang, South Korea	Zambia	2–1	2–1	Friendly
16	26 March 2013	Seoul, South Korea	Qatar	1–0	2–1	2014 FIFA World Cup qualification
17	6 September 2013	Incheon, South Korea	Haiti	3–1	4–1	Friendly
18	10 September 2013	Jeonju, South Korea	Croatia	1–2	1–2	Friendly
19	17 June 2014	Cuiabá, Brazil	Russia	1–0	1–1	2014 FIFA World Cup

== Honours ==
Júbilo Iwata

- J.League Cup: 2010

Ulsan Hyundai

- Korean FA Cup runner-up: 2018
- AFC Champions League: 2012, 2020

Sangju Sangmu

- K League 2: 2013

Jeonbuk Hyundai Motors

- K League 1: 2015

South Korea

- AFC Asian Cup runner-up: 2015
- EAFF Championship: 2008, 2017

Individual

- K League All-Star: 2007, 2012, 2013, 2014, 2017
- K League 1 Best XI: 2007, 2008, 2012, 2017
- AFC Champions League Most Valuable Player: 2012
- AFC Player of the Year: 2012
- K League 2 Most Valuable Player: 2013
- K League 2 top goalscorer: 2013
- K League 2 Best XI: 2013
- Korean FA Goal of the Year: 2014
