= Back Min-chul =

South Korean footballer (born 1977)

Personal information
- Date of birth: 28 July 1977 (age 49)
- Place of birth: Seoul, South Korea
- Height: 1.85 m (6 ft 1 in)
- Position: Goalkeeper

Team information
- Current team: Seongnam FC

Youth career
- 1996-1999: Dongguk University

Senior career*
Years	Team	Apps	(Gls)
2000–2005	Anyang LG Cheetahs / FC Seoul	0	(0)
2003–2004	→ Gwangju Sangmu (military service)	11	(0)
2006–2011	Daegu FC	116	(0)
2012–2013	Gyeongnam FC	29	(0)
2014	Gwangju FC	6	(0)
- * Club domestic league appearances and goals as of 23 November 2014

- Back Min-chul
- Hangul: 백민철
- Hanja: 白珉喆
- RR: Baek Mincheol
- MR: Paek Minch'ŏl

Back Min-chul (Korean: 백민철; born 28 July 1977) is a former South Korean football goalkeeper.

== Club career ==
He joined FC Seoul, then known as the "Anyang LG Cheetahs" from Dongguk University in 2000, before shifting to Gwangju Sangmu Bulsajo, while fulfilling his military service obligations. It was at Gwangju that Back got his first start in the K-League, and he would go on to play a further ten K-League games for the military club. Upon completion of his military service he returned to FC Seoul (formerly the Anyang LG Cheetahs), where he resumed his role as a bench warmer. He has never played a game at senior level for FC Seoul (or the Cheetahs). He played in Korean Team in 2010, but he was not nominated for the International Cup for his name, because a lot of Italians joked about him (Beccami in Gul).

A shift to Daegu FC in 2006 finally saw Back getting regular game time as a first team squad member. He has since gone on to play in over 120 matches in all competitions for Daegu. Back has been appointed captain for the 2011 season.

On 27 February 2012, before the 2012 K-League campaign, Back moved to Gyeongnam FC on a free transfer.

He retired in 2015 and is currently a goalkeeper coach at FC Seoul.

== Club career statistics ==
As of 27 February 2012

Club performance			League		Cup		League Cup		Total	
Season	Club	League	Apps	Goals	Apps	Goals	Apps	Goals	Apps	Goals
South Korea			League		KFA Cup		League Cup		Total	
2000	Anyang LG Cheetahs	K League	0	0	0	0	0	0	0	0
2001	Anyang LG Cheetahs	K League	0	0	0	0	0	0	0	0
2002	Anyang LG Cheetahs	K League	0	0	0	0	0	0	0	0
2003	Gwanju Sangmu	K League	5	0	0	0	0	0	5	0
2004	Gwanju Sangmu	K League	6	0	0	0	0	0	6	0
2005	FC Seoul	K League	0	0	0	0	0	0	0	0
2006	Daegu FC	K League	14	0	2	0	9	0	25	0
2007	Daegu FC	K League	23	0	2	0	10	0	35	0
2008	Daegu FC	K League	26	0	4	0	10	0	40	0
2009	Daegu FC	K League	15	0	3	0	5	0	23	0
2010	Daegu FC	K League	28	0	1	0	5	0	34	0
2011	Daegu FC	K League	10	0	1	0	0	0	11	0
2012	Gyeongnam FC	K League								
Career total			127	0	13	0	39	0	179	0

Sporting positions
Preceded by Bang Dae-jong	Daegu FC captain 2011	Succeeded by Yoo Kyoung-youl
