= Leandro (footballer, born October 1979) =

Brazilian footballer

Personal information
- Full name: Leandro Bernardi Silva
- Date of birth: October 6, 1979 (age 47)
- Place of birth: Osasco, Brazil
- Height: 1.83 m (6 ft 0 in)
- Position: Central defender

Team information
- Current team: Paysandu

Senior career*
Years	Team	Apps	(Gls)
2000–2003	EC Osasco		
- ADAP
- Cianorte FC
- Toledo CW
- CSA
2006–2009	Adap Galo Maringá		
2007	→ Coritiba (loan)		
2007–2009	→ Al-Ahli (loan)		
2008	→→ Daegu FC (loan)	11	(0)
2009	→→ Paraná Clube (loan)		
2009	América	19	(0)
2010	Itumbiara		
2010–2011	Ponte Preta	40	(2)
2012–2013	Avaí	31	(1)
2014–	Paysandu	0	(0)
- * Club domestic league appearances and goals as of 2 June 2014

Leandro Bernardi Silva, shortly Leandro (born October 6, 1979, in Osasco) is a Brazilian footballer who plays as a defender for Paysandu Sport Club.

== Career ==
Paraná Clube engaged on 28 March 2009 the Brazilian defender, the player arrives from Daegu FC (Korea).
