= Eninho =

Brazilian footballer (born 1981)

Personal information
- Full name: Ênio Oliveira Júnior
- Date of birth: 16 May 1981 (age 45)
- Place of birth: Murici, Alagoas, Brazil
- Height: 1.75 m (5 ft 9 in)
- Position: Attacking midfielder

Senior career*
Years	Team	Apps	(Gls)
1999–2000	Mogi Mirim		
2001	São Caetano		
2002	Mogi Mirim		
2003	Suwon Samsung	21	(2)
2004	Portuguesa		
2005	Grêmio		
2005–2006	Guarani		
2006	Vila Nova		
2006	Coruripe	?	(7)
2006	CRB	13	(9)
2006	Murici		
2007	Marília		
2007	Coruripe	8	(4)
2007–2008	Daegu FC	39	(11)
2009–2013	Jeonbuk Hyundai Motors	122	(46)
2013–2014	Changchun Yatai	38	(11)
2015	Jeonbuk Hyundai Motors	17	(1)
2015	Ceará	1	(0)
2016	Murici	3	(0)
- * Club domestic league appearances and goals

Ênio Oliveira Júnior, known as Eninho, (born 16 May 1981) is a Brazilian former professional footballer who played as an attacking midfielder.

== Career ==
Eninho was born in Porto Alegre, Rio Grande do Sul. He played for Brazilian clubs Mogi Mirim, São Caetano, Portuguesa, Grêmio, Guarani, Vila Nova, Coruripe, CRB, Murici and Marília, and for South Korean clubs Suwon Samsung Bluewings, Daegu FC, Jeonbuk Hyundai Motors and Chinese club Changchun Yatai.

=== Changchun Yatai ===
On 31 July 2013, he made his debut for Yatai in a 1–1 away draw against Qingdao Jonoon in the Chinese Super League. On 21 September 2013, he scored his first goal for the club in a 2–0 home win against Dalian Aerbin. On 30 October 2013, he was sent off in an eventual 2–1 defeat away at Shanghai Shenhua, theremore missing the pivotal final home game against Liaoning Whowin. Yatai eventually won the game 1–0 and successfully stayed up.

== Career statistics ==
As of 31 March 2016

Appearances and goals by club, season and competition
Club	Season	League			State League		National cup		League cup		International		Total	
Club	Season	Division	Apps	Goals	Apps	Goals	Apps	Goals	Apps	Goals	Apps	Goals	Apps	Goals
Daegu FC	2007	K-League	20	3	—		2	2	8	1	—		30	6
Daegu FC	2008	K-League	19	8	—		3	2	8	9	—		30	19
Daegu FC	Total		39	11	—		5	4	16	10	—		60	25
Jeonbuk Hyundai Motors	2009	K League Classic	25	7	—		4	1	3	3	—		32	11
Jeonbuk Hyundai Motors	2010	K League Classic	27	16	—		2	1	6	2	8	5	43	24
Jeonbuk Hyundai Motors	2011	K League Classic	26	11	—		2	1	0	0	10	7	38	19
Jeonbuk Hyundai Motors	2012	K League Classic	38	15	—		3	1	—		6	0	47	16
Jeonbuk Hyundai Motors	2013	K League Classic	13	3	—		0	0	—		6	2	19	5
Jeonbuk Hyundai Motors	Total		129	52	—		11	4	9	5	30	14	159	75
Changchun Yatai	2013	Chinese Super League	9	2	—		—		—		—		9	2
Changchun Yatai	2014	Chinese Super League	29	9	—		1	0	—		—		30	9
Changchun Yatai	Total		38	11	—		1	0	—		—		39	11
Jeonbuk Hyundai Motors	2015	K League Classic	17	1	—		1	0	—		8	3	26	4
Ceará	2015	Série B	1	0	—		—		—		—		1	0
Murici	2016	Alagoano	—		3	0	—		—		—		3	0
Career total			224	75	3	0	18	8	25	15	38	17	308	115

== Honours ==
Jeonbuk Hyundai Motors

- K League Classic: 2009, 2011

Individual

- Korean League Cup top scorer: 2008
- K League Best XI: 2009, 2010, 2011
