= Daegu Stadium =

Multi-purpose stadium in South Korea

- The Blue Arc
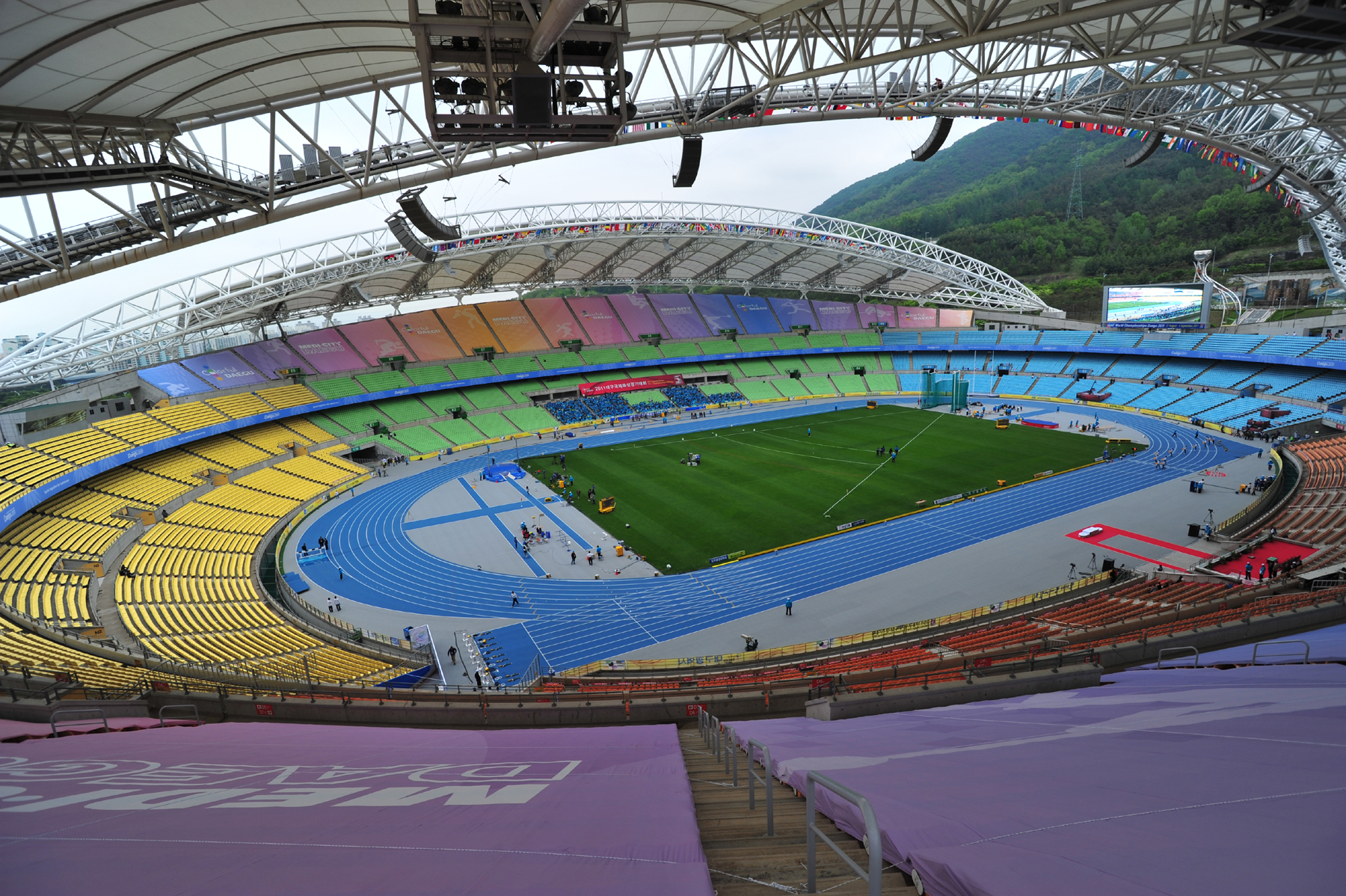
- Interior view of the stadium
- Interactive map of Daegu Stadium
- Full name: Daegu Stadium
- Former names: Daegu World Cup Stadium
- Location: 504, Daeheung-dong, Suseong-gu, Daegu, South Korea
- Owner: Daegu Metropolitan City
- Operator: Daegu Sports Facilities Management Center
- Capacity: 66,422
- Surface: Grass, Tartan track
- Field size: 105 x 68 m (running track: 400 m x 8 lane, 100 m x 9 lane)

Construction
- Groundbreaking: July 29, 1997; 29 years ago
- Opened: June 28, 2001; 25 years ago
- Cost: US$265 million
- Architects: Kang Cheol-Hee, Idea Image Institute of Architects (IIIA)
- Structural engineers: Substructure: Seoul Structure, Roof: WS Atkins
- General contractor: Samsung

Tenant
- Daegu FC (2003–2018)

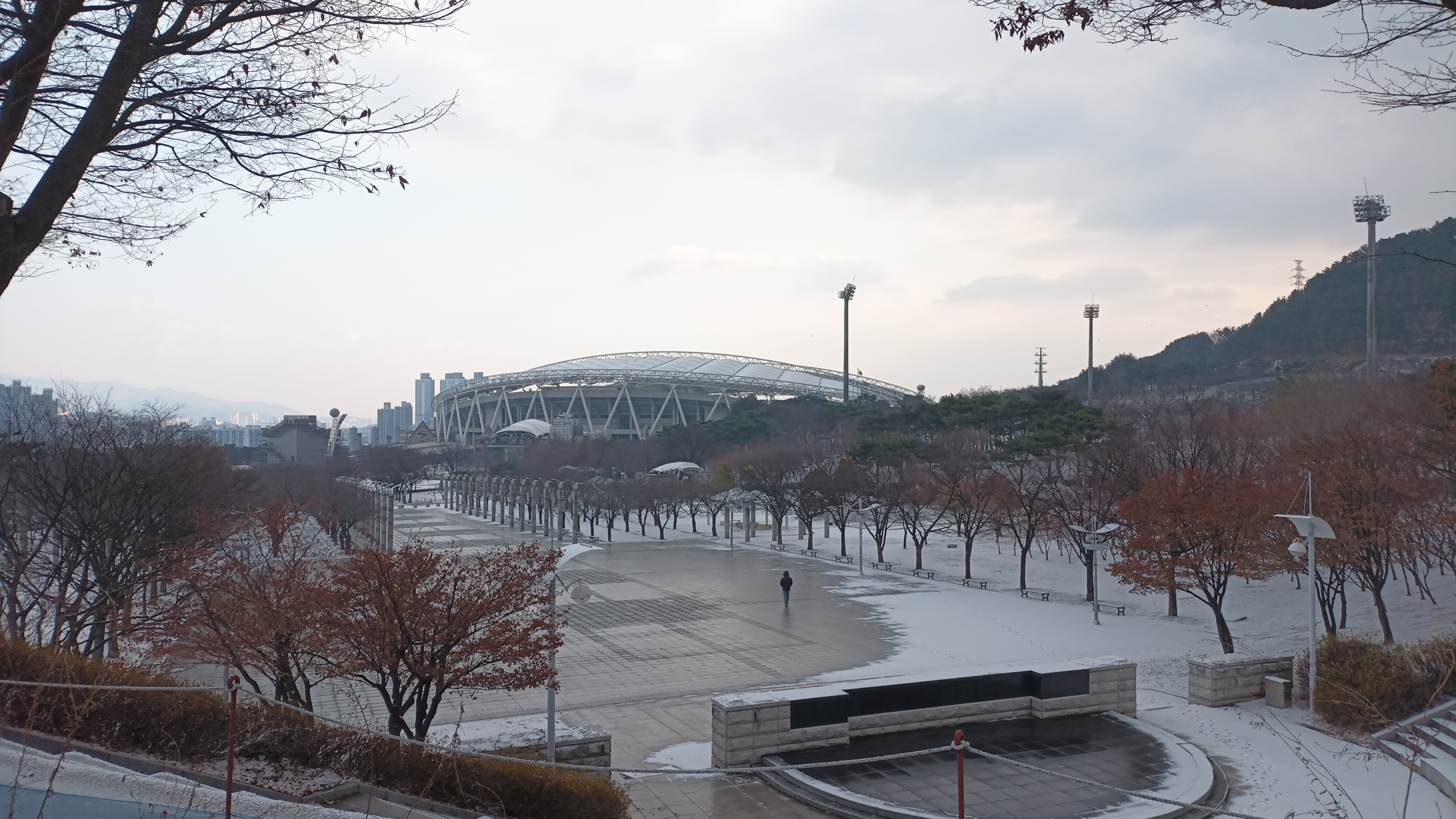
Park of Daegu Stadium

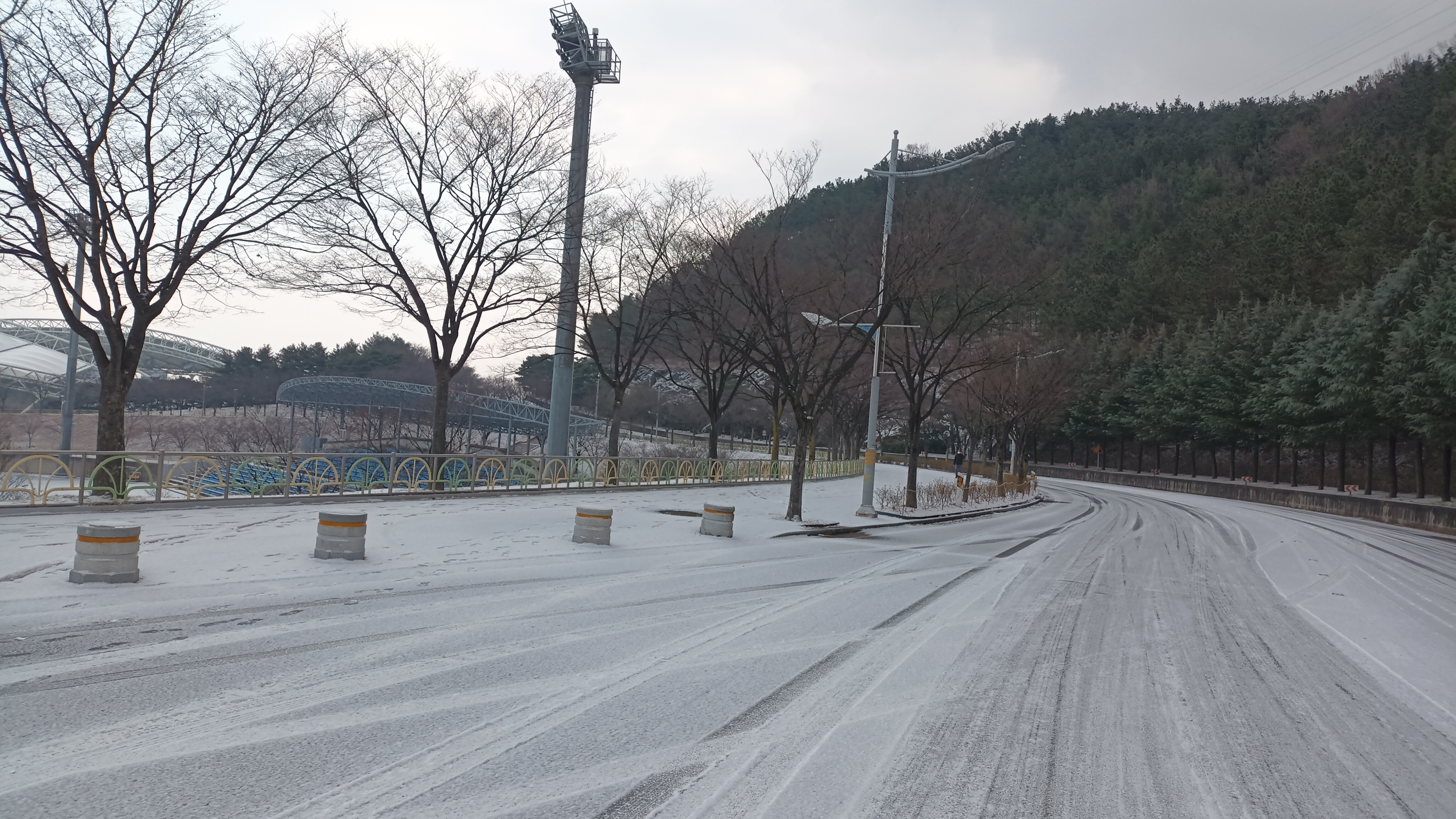
back side road of Stadium

Daegu Stadium (Korean: 대구스타디움), also known as the Blue Arc, is a multi-purpose sports stadium located in Daegu, South Korea. It was formerly named Daegu World Cup Stadium but was changed to Daegu Stadium on 5 March 2008. It has a seating capacity for 66,422 people, and parking for 3,550 cars. It is located approximately 11 kilometers or 20 minutes by car from Daegu Airport. It is managed by the Daegu Sports Facilities Management Center.

It was one of the host venues of the 2002 FIFA World Cup and the main stadium for the 2003 Summer Universiade and the 2011 World Championships in Athletics. It was the home stadium of Daegu FC until 2018.

== Construction ==
The construction started in July 1997 and was completed in May 2001 in time for the 2002 FIFA World Cup at a cost of 265,000,000 USD. The roof was engineered by the international consultancy WS Atkins. The roof is in two sections, each with an inclined trussed steel arch spanning 273 m for a rise of only 28.7 m, and propped by 13 secondary arches off a perimeter second "arch" that is supported by raking columns. The total roof steel weight is 4,350 t. The roof cladding is a PTFE-coated glass-reinforced fabric canopy. The modelling (form-finding) and analysis of the tensile roof was performed by Tensys. Wind tunnel studies were carried out by BMT Limited to assess the wind loading on the roof.

== 2002 FIFA World Cup ==
The stadium was the largest stadium in South Korea during the 2002 FIFA World Cup. It held the following matches:

Date	Team 1	Result	Team 2	Round	Attendance
6 June 2002	Denmark	1–1	Senegal	Group A	43,500
8 June 2002	South Africa	1–0	Slovenia	Group B	47,226
10 June 2002	South Korea	1–1	United States	Group D	60,778
29 June 2002	South Korea	2–3	Turkey	Third place match	63,483

== Events ==
=== Daegu Marathon ===
Daegu World Cup Stadium hosts the Daegu Marathon annually in April of each year.

=== Concerts ===
The stadium was also the venue for the 8th Asia Song Festival, organised by Korea Foundation for International Culture Exchange, in 2011.

== See also ==
- List of football stadiums in South Korea
- Lists of stadiums

Events and tenants
Preceded by Olympiastadion; Berlin	IAAF World Championships in Athletics; Venue; 2011	Succeeded by Luzhniki Stadium; Moscow
Preceded by Workers' Stadium; Beijing	Summer Universiade; Opening and Closing Ceremonies; 2003	Succeeded by İzmir Atatürk Stadium; İzmir
