= Daegu FC =

South Korean association football club

- Full name: Daegu Football Club 대구시민프로축구단
- Founded: 2002; 24 years ago
- Ground: Daegu iM Bank Park
- Capacity: 12,419
- Owner: Daegu Metropolitan City
- Chairman: Choo Kyung-ho (Mayor of Daegu)
- Head coach: Choi Sung-yong
- League: K League 2
- 2025: K League 1, 12th of 12 (relegated)
- Website: www.daegufc.co.kr
Home colours	Away colours

Daegu FC (Korean: 대구 FC) is a South Korean professional football club based in Daegu that competes in the K League 2, the second-tier of South Korean professional football. Founded as a community club at the end of 2002, they made their K League debut in 2003. The club won the 2018 Korean FA Cup and have advanced to the round of 16 in the 2021 and 2022 editions of the AFC Champions League.

== History ==
=== Foundation ===
Daegu FC was established in 2002 as a community club (generally in South Korea, a "community-club" means that the club issues shares) based in the city of Daegu. The city is a key shareholder, and the current mayor is chairman of the club. Following their foundation, the club entered the 2003 season of the K League under manager Park Jong-hwan. Park had previously managed the national side for a number of years in the 1980s and 1990s. The club's entry, together with that of Gwangju Sangmu, brought the number of teams participating in the league to 12.

=== Domestic competitions ===
Daegu finished the 2003 K League season in 11th place (out of 12 teams), winning seven games, and drawing sixteen. In the 2003 Korean FA Cup, Daegu reached the quarterfinals, where they were defeated 1–0 by Ulsan Hyundai Horang-i. Daegu improved in 2004 to tenth place in the league which, due to Incheon United's entry, now numbered 13 clubs. In the FA Cup, Daegu were knocked out in the round of 32 by National League side Ansan Hallelujah. In the Samsung Hauzen Cup, a new cup competition run as a league competition specifically for K League clubs (thus excluding National League and lower-tier clubs) during the K League's mid-season break, finished eighth out of 13 teams. The following season saw Daegu placed eighth place in the league and seventh in the Samsung Hauzen Cup. In the FA Cup, after defeating University and National League sides, Daegu were knocked out in the quarterfinals in a 2–1 loss to another K League side, the Chunnam Dragons.

For the 2006 K League season, the club placed seventh overall in the league and was 13th in Samsung Hauzen Cup. It reached the quarterfinals of the 2006 edition of the FA Cup but lost (again) to the Chunnam Dragons. Following completion of the 2006 season, Park Jong-hwan stepped down as manager after four years with the club. On 1 December 2006, Byun Byung-joo was appointed as the new manager. A former South Korean international, Byun had no previous K League management experience prior to his appointment as Daegu FC's manager. The club's performance slipped in comparison to its previous two seasons, and it placed 12th. The club failed to get out of the group stage in the 2007 Samsung Hauzen Cup and achieved a similar level of performance in the FA Cup, where Daegu lost to Incheon United in the round of 16.

In 2008, Daegu played extremely aggressive football, becoming the joint equal top-scoring team of the K League, alongside Suwon Samsung Bluewings. However, they also conceded the most goals in the league. An 11th place in the K League standings was the eventual outcome. For the first time in its history, Daegu reached the semi-finals of the Korean FA Cup, by defeating Ulsan in the quarterfinals, following a win in the round of 16 over Ansan Hallelujah. However, they then lost to their opponents Pohang Steelers in a 2–0 loss. The club placed fifth (out of six teams) in their group in the Samsung Hauzen Cup.

The 2009 season was one of the worst in the club's history. In a now expanded league of 15 clubs, thanks to new entrant Gangwon FC, Daegu would place in the last, 15th place, winning only five games. In the FA Cup, Daegu reached the quarterfinals, against Daejeon Citizen, the game finished with a 1–1 scoreline. Daegu lost out in the subsequent penalty shoot-out. In the league cup, the club finished third in their group, one point away from qualifying for the knockout phase of the cup. Later in the year, Lee Young-jin was appointed as manager for the 2010 season. Lee, who has previously coached FC Seoul, replaced Byun who had resigned after being embroiled in a scandal involving a player's agent and payoffs for selecting specific players.

On field, Daegu repeated their dismal performances of the previous season, finishing 15th in the K League standings, equal with Gwangju Sangmu on points. Daegu conceded the most goals of any club in the league, losing 19 games out of 28 games, with five wins and four draws. In the FA Cup, Daegu lost 1–0 after extra time to the National League side Suwon City. Better results were achieved in the League Cup, with Daegu progressing out of their group to the knockout stage, thanks to wins over Daejeon Citizen and Busan, before losing to FC Seoul after a penalty shoot-out.

By virtue of winning the 2018 Korean FA Cup, Daegu qualified for its first appearance in the AFC Champions League.

After a controversial fall out with the club's executive director, manager André left Daegu FC in January 2020. The club then announced Lee Byung-keun, who had joined the club as the chief assistant coach at the beginning of the 2019 season, as a caretaker manager to lead the club in the upcoming 2020 K League 1 season.

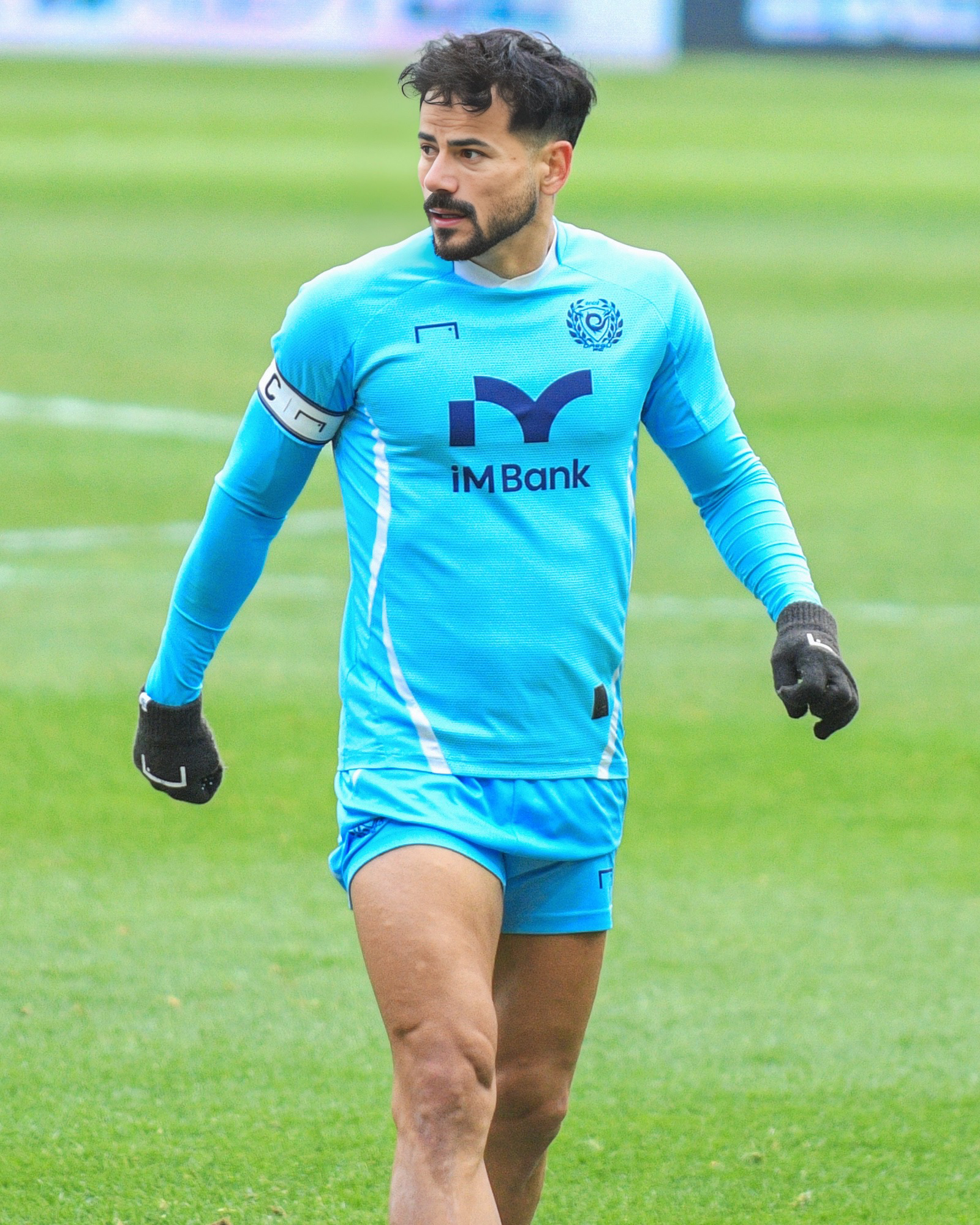
Daegu captain Cesinha is the highest scoring and most capped player for the club

Daegu narrowly avoided relegation in 2024 by defeating second division club Chungnam Asan in the promotion-relegation play-offs after finishing 11th in the regular season. However, the club was automatically relegated in 2025, finishing bottom of the table.

=== International competitions ===
Prior to the start of the 2006 K League season, Daegu participated in the Tongyeong Cup. The Tongyeong Cup was a four-team invitational tournament held in Tongyeong, South Korea. As well as Daegu and fellow K League club Incheon United, A-League side Queensland Roar and Beijing Guo'an were also part of the tournament. After beating both Incheon and Beijing, Daegu drew 0–0 with Queensland, winning the Tongyeong Cup and thus its first trophy.

In 2019, the club played in the 2019 AFC Champions League, and for the group stage was placed with Sanfrecce Hiroshima, Guangzhou Evergrande and Melbourne Victory. Despite having the lowest wage bill of all the K-League clubs, it won its first game, against Melbourne Victory. It went on to win two more games in the group stage but failed to progress to the knockout phase.

Daegu made it to the knockout stages of the 2021 and 2022 editions of the AFC Champions League, and defeated eventual tournament winners Urawa Red Diamonds 1–0 in the group stage of the 2022 competition before being knocked out by compatriots Jeonbuk Hyundai Motors in the next round.

== Rivalries ==
Daegu shares a rivalry with the nearby Daegu–Gyeongbuk club Pohang Steelers. The city of Daegu was previously part of North Gyeongsang Province, which Pohang is now the largest city of.

The club also shares a rivalry with Gwangju FC, mirroring the Samsung Lions-Kia Tigers baseball rivalry between the two cities. The 'Moonlight Derby' between the two cities (borrowed from the 'Moonlight Series' rivalry name in baseball) stems from differences in their respective political leanings.

== Stadium ==
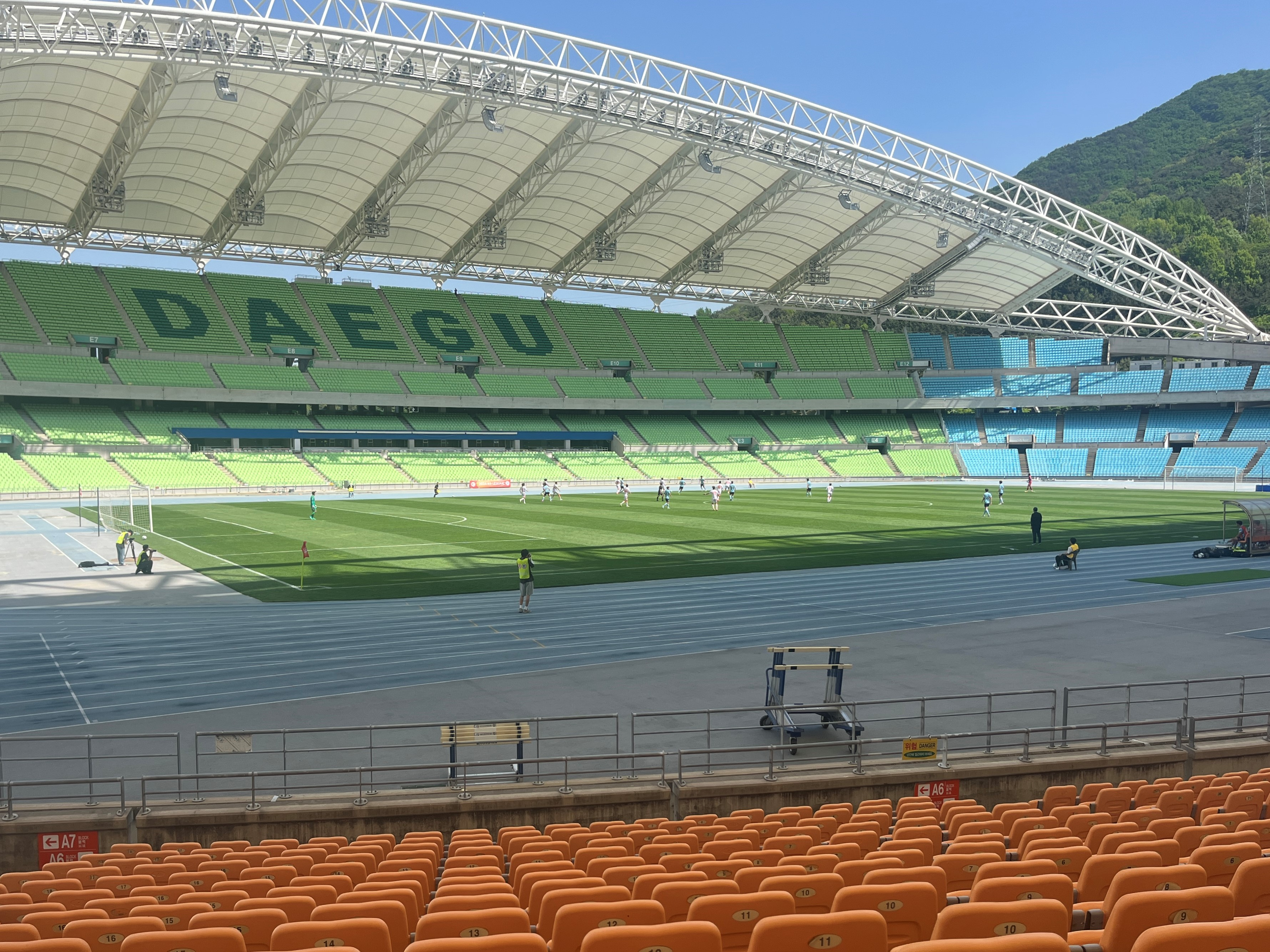
Daegu FC's first home ground, Daegu Stadium

The club's first home ground, Daegu Stadium (formerly Daegu World Cup Stadium), was opened on 28 June 2001 and is owned by the Daegu Metropolitan City. The stadium was one of the venues for the 2002 FIFA World Cup, hosting three group stage matches, as well as the third-place match between South Korea and Turkey. Daegu FC used the stadium as their main venue between 2003 and 2018. The stadium has 66,422 seats, and it is covered by natural grass. The name was changed to Daegu Stadium on 5 March 2008. Occasionally, Daegu FC played its home games at the Daegu Civic Stadium.

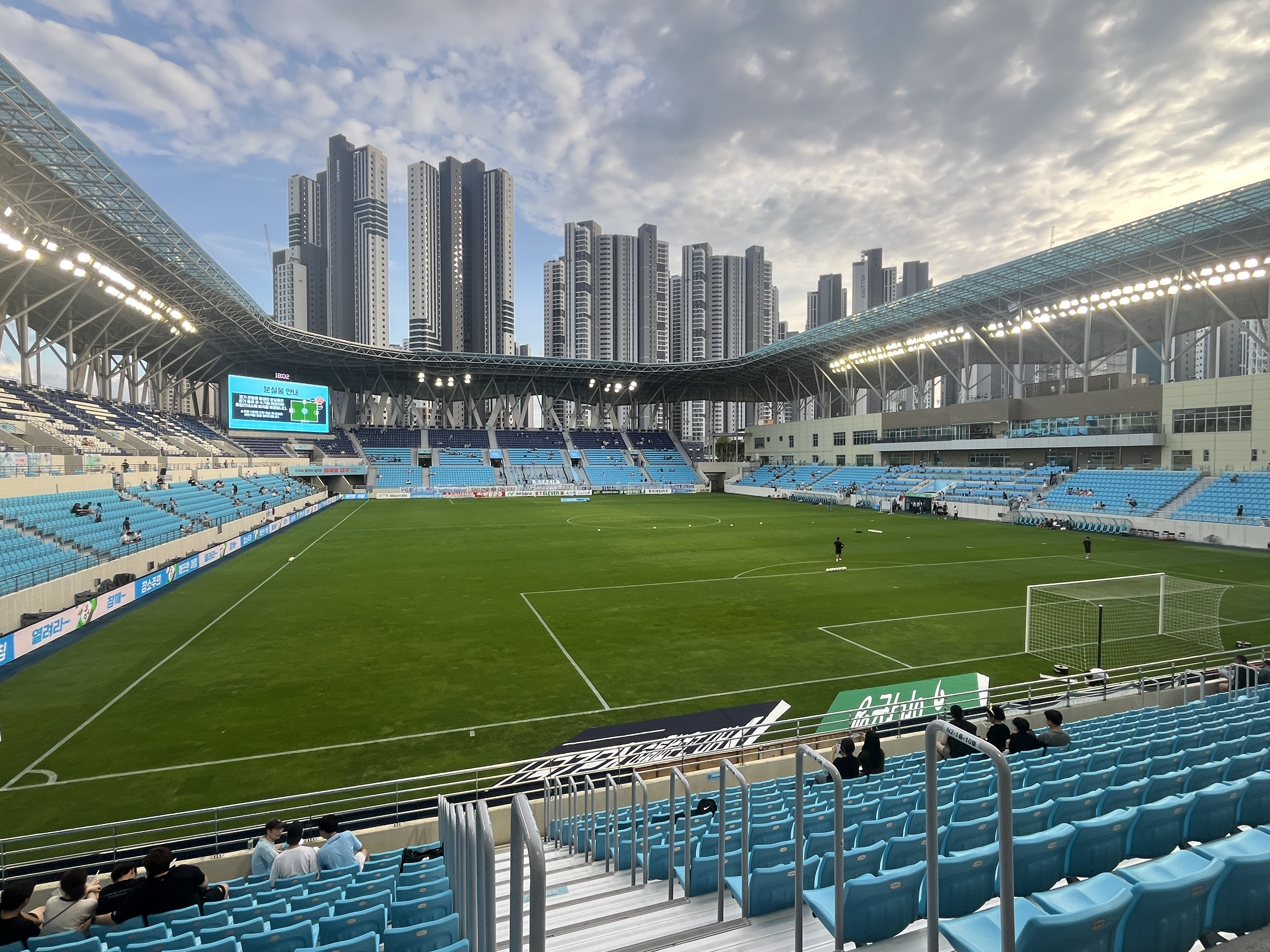
The pitch at Daegu iM Bank Park

In the 2019 season, Daegu FC relocated to the DGB Daegu Bank Park, a 12,419-capacity football-specific stadium built at the same location as the demolished Daegu Civic Stadium. The small but compact stadium located in the Buk District of the city has led to it constantly selling out and consistently breaking their attendance record year after year. In 2025, the stadium was renamed as Daegu iM Bank Park due to the name change of the stadium's sponsor, iM Bank.

== Players ==
=== Current squad ===
As of 8 October 2026

Note: Flags indicate national team as defined under FIFA eligibility rules; some limited exceptions apply. Players may hold more than one non-FIFA nationality.

No.	Pos.	Nation	Player
1	GK	KOR	Goh Dong-min
2	DF	KOR	Hwang Jae-won
4	DF	KOR	Jo Hyun-tae (on loan from Gangwon FC)
6	DF	KOR	Kim Joo-won
7	FW	BRA	Danrlei
8	MF	KOR	Han Kook-young (vice-captain)
9	FW	BRA	Edgar
10	FW	BRA	Matheus Serafim
11	FW	BRA	Cesinha (captain)
13	GK	KOR	Park Seong-su
14	MF	KOR	Park Se-jin
15	DF	KOR	Lee Won-woo
16	FW	WAL	Marcus Dackers
17	FW	KOR	Go Jae-hyun
20	DF	KOR	Kim Gang-san (vice-captain)
21	MF	KOR	Son Seung-min
22	DF	KOR	Jang Seong-won
25	MF	KOR	Kim Dae-woo
26	DF	KOR	Hwang In-taek
27	DF	KOR	Jung Heon-taek

No.	Pos.	Nation	Player
29	MF	KOR	Ryu Jae-moon
30	MF	KOR	Han Jong-mu
31	GK	KOR	Han Tae-hee
34	FW	KOR	Park Gi-hyun
35	DF	KOR	Yoon Tae-min
37	MF	KOR	Moon Jung-won
39	MF	KOR	Kwon Kwang-deok
40	DF	KOR	Byeon Jeong-woo
44	DF	KOR	Lee Ye-jun
46	DF	KOR	Sung Kwon-seok
47	FW	KOR	Kim Min-jun
50	DF	KOR	Kim Hyeong-jin
51	GK	KOR	Park Do-hun
55	DF	KOR	Hong Jae-seok (on loan from FC Anyang)
66	DF	KOR	Lee Rim
70	DF	KOR	Yoo Ji-un
72	DF	KOR	Choi Kang-min
77	FW	KOR	Kim Ju-gong
80	FW	KOR	Park Dae-hoon
99	FW	KOR	Park In-hyeok

=== Out on loan ===
Note: Flags indicate national team as defined under FIFA eligibility rules; some limited exceptions apply. Players may hold more than one non-FIFA nationality.

No.	Pos.	Nation	Player
—	GK	KOR	Park Man-ho (at Gimcheon Sangmu for military service)
—	GK	KOR	Park Sang-young (at Gimcheon Sangmu for military service)
—	DF	KOR	Kim Jin-hyuk (at Busan IPark)
—	DF	KOR	Lee Je-wook (at Seoul Jungnang)

No.	Pos.	Nation	Player
—	DF	KOR	Park Jae-hyeon (at Gimhae FC 2008)
—	FW	KOR	Han Seo-jin (at Seoul Jungnang)
—	FW	KOR	Jeon Yong-jun (at Jinju Citizen for military service)
—	FW	GHA	Isaac Osei (at Jinju Citizen)

=== Retired number(s) ===
12 – Club Supporters (the 12th Man)
24 – Park Jong-jin

=== Captains ===
Season	Captain
2003	(South Korea) Oh Ju-po
2003	(South Korea) Kim Hak-chul
2004	(South Korea) Roh Sang-rae
2005	(South Korea) Jin Soon-jin
2005	(South Korea) Song Jung-hyun
2006	(South Korea) Lee Sang-il
2006–07	(South Korea) Kim Hyun-soo
2008	(South Korea) Hwang Sun-pil
2009	(South Korea) Jang Nam-seok
2010	(South Korea) Bang Dae-jong
2011	(South Korea) Back Min-chul
2012–13	(South Korea) Yoo Kyoung-youl
2014	(South Korea) An Sang-hyun
2015	(South Korea) Heo Jae-won
2016	(South Korea) Park Tae-hong
2017–19	(South Korea) Han Hee-hoon
2020	(South Korea) Hong Jeong-un
2021–2022	(South Korea) Kim Jin-hyuk
2022–present	(Brazil) Cesinha

=== R-League ===
From 2008 to 2011, Daegu FC fielded a team in the R-League, established in 2000 for the reserve squads of the professional K-League clubs. The National Policy Agency also entered a team in the league. The league format provided for two groups of teams (six to eight in each group), each group member playing the others in the group, three or four times, depending on the number of teams in the groups. The top two teams in each group moved onto a playoff round although from 2010, the title was shared between the winners of each group.

In 2008, Daegu placed 7th out of the 8 teams in their group, winning three of 18 games. They fared little better in 2009, finishing last in their group of five teams. In 2010, Daegu's reserve squad only won one of their group games, while they drew two, and lost 11 times. The side's return of 5 points saw it place 8th and last in their group. In 2011, the club improved to 5th in its group, with eight wins. It did not enter the 2012 edition of the competition.

== Club officials ==
- Chairman: (South Korea) Hong Joon-pyo (Daegu mayor)
- Executive director: (South Korea) Cho Kwang-rae
- Scout: (South Korea) Sung Ho-sang

Coaching staff

- Head coach: (South Korea) Choi Sung-yong
- Assistant head coach: (South Korea) Jung Seon-ho
- Goalkeeping coach: (South Korea) Lee Yong-bal
- Fitness coach & interpreter: (South Korea) Lee Jong-hyun
- Medical trainer: (South Korea) Park Hae-seung, (South Korea) No Hyeon-uk, (South Korea) Lee Dae-gyun
- Data analyst: (South Korea) Park Jun-chul

=== List of managers ===
No.	Name	From	To	Season(s)
1	(South Korea) Park Jong-hwan	2002/10/09	2006/11/05	2003–2006
2	(South Korea) Byun Byung-joo	2006/11/28	2009/12/07	2007–2009
3	(South Korea) Lee Young-jin	2009/12/22	2011/10/31	2010–2011
4	(Brazil) Moacir Pereira	2011/11/02	2012/12/01	2012
5	(South Korea) Dang Sung-jeung	2012/12/03	2013/04/20	2013
6	(South Korea) Baek Jong-chul	2013/04/23	2013/11/30	2013
7	(South Korea) Choi Deok-ju	2013/12/20	2014/11/18	2014
8	(South Korea) Lee Young-jin	2014/11/24	2016/08/12	2015–2016
C	(South Korea) Son Hyun-jun	2016/08/13	2016/11/21	2016
9	(South Korea) Son Hyun-jun	2016/11/22	2017/05/22	2017
C	(Brazil) André	2017/05/23	2017/11/15	2017
10	(Brazil) André	2017/11/16	2020/01/28	2017–2019
C	(South Korea) Lee Byung-keun	2020/01/30	2020/11/05	2020
11	(South Korea) Lee Byung-keun	2020/11/06	2021/12/20	2021
12	(Brazil) Alexandre Gama	2021/12/22	2022/08/14	2022
C	(South Korea) Choi Won-kwon	2022/08/15	2022/11/07	2022
13	(South Korea) Choi Won-kwon	2022/11/07	2024/04/19	2023–2024
14	(South Korea) Park Chang-hyun	2024/04/23	2025/04/13	2024–2025
C	(South Korea) Seo Dong-won	2025/04/13	2025/05/26	2025
15	(South Korea) Kim Byung-soo	2025/05/27	2026/04/19	2025–2026
16	(South Korea) Choi Sung-yong	2026/04/20	present	2026–

== Honours ==
- K League Challenge
  - Runners-up (1): 2016
- Korean FA Cup
  - Winners (1): 2018
  - Runners-up (1): 2021

== Season-by-season records ==
=== Domestic record ===
Season	League										Korean Cup
Season	Div.	GP	W	D	L	GF	GA	GD	Pts	Pos.	Korean Cup
2003	1	44	7	16	21	38	60	–22	37	11	QF
2004	1	24	7	7	10	30	31	–1	28	10	Ro32
2005	1	24	8	6	10	30	29	+1	30	8	QF
2006	1	26	8	10	8	32	30	+2	34	7	QF
2007	1	26	6	6	14	35	46	–11	24	12	Ro16
2008	1	26	8	2	16	46	58	–12	26	11	SF
2009	1	28	5	8	15	20	45	–25	23	15	QF
2010	1	28	5	4	19	28	57	–29	19	15	Ro32
2011	1	30	8	9	13	35	46	–11	33	12	Ro32
2012	1	44	16	13	15	55	56	–1	61	10	Ro16
2013	1	38	6	14	18	36	57	–21	32	13↓	Ro32
2014	2	36	13	8	15	50	47	+3	47	7	Ro32
2015	2	40	18	13	9	67	47	+20	67	3	Ro32
2016	2	40	19	13	8	53	36	+17	70	2↑	Ro32
2017	1	38	11	14	13	50	52	–2	47	8	Ro32
2018	1	38	14	8	16	47	56	–9	50	7	W
2019	1	38	13	16	9	46	37	+9	55	5	Ro16
2020	1	27	10	8	9	43	39	+4	38	5	Ro16
2021	1	38	15	10	13	41	48	–7	55	3	RU
2022	1	38	10	16	12	52	59	–7	46	8	SF
2023	1	38	13	14	11	42	43	–1	53	6	Ro16
2024	1	38	9	13	16	45	52	–7	40	11	R3
2025	1	38	7	13	18	47	67	–20	34	12↓	QF

Key

- W = Winners
- RU = Runners-up
- SF = Semi-final
- QF = Quarter-final
- Ro16 = Round of 16
- Ro32 = Round of 32
- R3 = Third round

=== AFC Champions League record ===
All results list Daegu's goal tally first.

Season	Round	Opposition	Home	Away	Agg.
2019	Group stage (Group F)	(Australia) Melbourne Victory	4–0	3–1	3rd out of 4
2019	Group stage (Group F)	(China) Guangzhou Evergrande	3–1	0–1	3rd out of 4
2019	Group stage (Group F)	(Japan) Sanfrecce Hiroshima	0–1	0–2	3rd out of 4
2021	Group stage (Group I) (Note: Played at a neutral venue.)	(Japan) Kawasaki Frontale	1–3	2–3	2nd out of 4
2021	Group stage (Group I)	(Philippines) United City	7–0	4–0	2nd out of 4
2021	Group stage (Group I)	(China) Beijing Guoan	5–0	3–0	2nd out of 4
2021	Round of 16	(Japan) Nagoya Grampus	—N/a	2–4	—N/a
2022	Play-off	(Thailand) Buriram United	1–1 (a.e.t.) (3–2 pen.)	—N/a	—N/a
2022	Group stage (Group F)	(China) Shandong Taishan	4–0	7–0	1st out of 4
2022	Group stage (Group F)	(Singapore) Lion City Sailors	0–3	2–1	1st out of 4
2022	Group stage (Group F)	(Japan) Urawa Red Diamonds	1–0	0–0	1st out of 4
2022	Round of 16	(South Korea) Jeonbuk Hyundai Motors	1–2 (a.e.t.)	—N/a	—N/a

== Sponsors ==
Kit manufacturer

- 2003: Kappa
- 2004: Joma
- 2005–06: Kika
- 2007–08: Lotto
- 2009–10: Joma
- 2011–14: Hummel
- 2015–17: Kelme
- 2018: The Hump
- 2019–20: Forward Everywear
- 2021–2025: Goal Studio
- 2026–present: Mizuno
