= 2012 Jeonnam Dragons season =

Chunnam Dragons
2012 season
- Chairman: Lee Kun-Soo
- Manager: Jung Hae-Seong
- K-League: 10th
- Korean FA Cup: Round of 16
- Top goalscorer: League: Lee Jong-Ho (3); All: Lee Jong-Ho (3)
- Highest home attendance: 4,355 vs Gangwon (March 4)
- Lowest home attendance: 940 vs Changwon City (May 23)
- Average home league attendance: 3,071 (as of June 14)
Home colours	Away colours

The 2012 season was Chunnam Dragons' eighteenth season in the K-League in South Korea. Chunnam Dragons will be competing in K-League and Korean FA Cup.

== Current squad ==
Note: Flags indicate national team as defined under FIFA eligibility rules; some limited exceptions apply. Players may hold more than one non-FIFA nationality.

No.	Pos.	Nation	Player
1	GK	KOR	Lee Woon-Jae (captain)
2	MF	KOR	Park Sun-Yong
3	MF	KOR	Yoon Suk-Young
4	DF	KOR	Hong Jin-Gi
5	DF	KOR	Lee Sang-Ho
6	MF	KOR	Kim Young-Wook
7	FW	KOR	Han Jae-Woong
8	MF	KOR	Lee Hyun-Seung
9	FW	KOR	Kim Shin-young
10	FW	AUS	Matt Simon
12	MF	KOR	Lee Seung-Hee
13	DF	AUS	Robert Cornthwaite
14	MF	KOR	Kim Geun-Cheol
15	DF	KOR	Jung Myung-Oh
16	MF	KOR	Yoo Ji-No
17	FW	KOR	Lee Jong-Ho
18	FW	KOR	Shim Dong-Woon

No.	Pos.	Nation	Player
19	FW	KOR	Shin Young-Jun
20	DF	KOR	An Jae-Jun
21	GK	KOR	Ryu Won-Woo
22	DF	KOR	Lee Wan
23	FW	KOR	Gong Young-Sun
24	DF	KOR	Jeong Hyun-Yoon
25	MF	KOR	Kim Dong-Chul
26	FW	KOR	Ju Sung-Hwan
28	DF	KOR	Jeong Jun-Yeon
29	MF	KOR	Park Young-Jun
30	DF	KOR	Jung Keun-Hee
31	GK	KOR	Kim Dae-Ho
32	MF	KOR	Son Seol-Min
33	DF	KOR	Lee Seul-Chan
34	MF	KOR	Jung Hoon-Chan
41	GK	KOR	Song Ji-Yong

=== Out on loan ===
Note: Flags indicate national team as defined under FIFA eligibility rules; some limited exceptions apply. Players may hold more than one non-FIFA nationality.

No.	Pos.	Nation	Player
—	DF	KOR	Bang Dae-Jong (to Sangju Sangmu Phoenix for military service)
—	DF	KOR	Hwang Do-Yeon (to Daejeon Citizen)
—	FW	KOR	Ko Cha-Won (to Sangju Sangmu Phoenix for military service)
—	FW	KOR	Park Jung-Hoon (to Gangwon FC until 2012 season)

== Transfer ==
=== In ===
No.	Pos.	Nation	Player
—	MF	BRA	Silva (from (Brazil) Velo Clube)
—	DF	KOR	Han Jae-Woong (from Daejeon Citizen)
—	MF	KOR	Kim Geun-Cheol (from Busan I'Park)
—	GK	KOR	Kim Dae-Ho (from Ulsan Mipo Dockyard)
—	MF	BRA	Paulo (from (Brazil) Velo Clube)
—	FW	AUS	Matt Simon (from (Australia) Central Coast Mariners)
—	MF	KOR	Lee Hyun-Seung (from FC Seoul, previously on loan)
—	FW	KOR	Kim Shin-young (Unattached, former (Japan) Ventforet Kofu)
—	MF	KOR	Park Jung-Hoon (from Jeonbuk Hyundai Motors)

No.	Pos.	Nation	Player
—	MF	KOR	Jung Myung-Oh (from Suwon City FC)
—	DF	KOR	Hong Jin-Gi (drafted)
—	FW	KOR	Shim Dong-Woon (drafted)
—	DF	KOR	Kim Dong-Cheol (drafted)
—	MF	KOR	Son Seol-Min (drafted)
—	DF	KOR	Lee Seul-Chan (drafted)
—	DF	KOR	Jeong Hyun-Yoon (drafted)
—	FW	KOR	Ju Sung-Hwan (drafted)

=== Out ===
No.	Pos.	Nation	Player
7	MF	KOR	Kim Myung-Joong (contract terminated, to Gangwon FC)
11	FW	BRA	Índio (loan return to (Brazil) Vitória)
15	DF	KOR	Bang Dae-Jong (to Sangju Sangmu Phoenix FC, army)
17	DF	KOR	Lee Jun-Ki (released)
18	FW	BRA	Wesley (loan return to (Brazil) Corinthians B)
20	MF	COL	Javier Reina (loan return to (Brazil) Cruzeiro)
24	DF	KOR	Hwang Sun-Pil (to Busan I'Park)
25	DF	KOR	Hwang Do-Yeon (loaned to Daejeon Citizen)
26	DF	KOR	Kim Jae-Hoon (to Daejeon Citizen)
29	MF	KOR	Kim Hyung-Pil (to Busan I'Park)
31	GK	KOR	Shin Jung-Hwan (contract terminated, to Ulsan Mipo Dockyard)
32	DF	KOR	Kim Myung-Sun (contract terminated, to Yongin City FC)
36	FW	KOR	Kim Se-Hoon (contract terminated, to Seongnam Ilhwa Chunma)
37	MF	KOR	Seo Ju-Hang (contract terminated)

No.	Pos.	Nation	Player
38	MF	KOR	Joo Hyun-Woo (contract terminated)
40	DF	KOR	Baek Jin-Mok (released)
41	GK	KOR	Kim Kyo-Bin (released, to Daegu FC)
42	MF	KOR	Kang Jin-Kyu (contract terminated, to Busan Transportation Corporation)
43	MF	KOR	Kwon Hyung-Sun (contract terminated)
44	FW	KOR	Jang Yong-Ik (contract terminated)
45	MF	KOR	Lee Nam-Yong (contract terminated, to Seoul United)
46	MF	KOR	Lee Byung-Yoon (contract terminated)
50	MF	KOR	Jung Kyung-ho (contract terminated, to Jeju United)
36	FW	KOR	Kim Se-Hoon (contract terminated, to Seongnam Ilhwa Chunma)
77	MF	BRA	Paulo (released)
11	MF	BRA	Silva (released)
27	FW	KOR	Park Jung-Hoon (loan out)

== Coaching staff ==
Position	Staff
Manager	(South Korea) Jung Hae-Seong
Assistant Manager	(South Korea) Yoon Deuk-Yeo
Coach	(South Korea) Cho Jin-Ho
Coach	(South Korea) Kim Do-Keun
GK Coach	(Brazil) João Brigatti
Physical Coach	(Brazil) Lubio Alencar da Silva
Scouter	(South Korea) Kim Gil-Sik

Last updated: 4 March 2012
Source: Chunnam Dragons

== Match results ==
=== K-League ===
All times are Korea Standard Time (KST) – UTC+9

Date Round	Home	Score	Away	Location

4 March 1	Chunnam	0 – 0	Gangwon	Gwangyang, Jeonnam
15:00		Report		Stadium: Gwangyang Football Stadium; Attendance: 4,355; Referee: An Yong-Hee

10 March 2	Seoul	2 – 0	Chunnam	Mapo-gu, Seoul
15:00	Damjanović 4'; Molina 73'	Report		Stadium: Seoul World Cup Stadium; Attendance: 18,306; Referee: Kim Sung-Ho

17 March 3	Jeonbuk	1 – 1	Chunnam	Jeonju, Jeonbuk
15:00	Lee Dong-Gook 17' (pen.)	Report	Ahn Jae-Joon 31'	Stadium: Jeonju World Cup Stadium; Attendance: 8,992; Referee: Choi Myung-Yong

24 March 4	Chunnam	3 – 1	Gyeongnam	Gwangyang, Jeonnam
15:00	Lee Jong-Ho 54' (Assist by No.13); Son Seol-Min 80' (Assist by No.3); Shim Dong-Woon	Report	Jo Jae-Cheol 89'	Stadium: Gwangyang Football Stadium; Attendance: 2,813; Referee: Hong Jin-Ho

30 March 5	Pohang	1 – 0	Chunnam	Pohang, Gyeongbuk
19:30	Cho Chan-Ho 29'	Report		Stadium: Pohang Steel Yard; Attendance: 6,128; Referee: Lee Jong-Guk

7 April 6	Chunnam	1 – 1	Suwon	Gwangyang, Jeonnam
17:00	Lee Jong-Ho 6' (Assist by No.7)	Report	Radončić 51'	Stadium: Gwangyang Football Stadium; Attendance: 4,259; Referee: Ko Keum-Bok

11 April 7	Chunnam	0 – 1	Seongnam	Gwangyang, Jeonnam
15:00		Report	Jovančić 51'	Stadium: Gwangyang Football Stadium; Attendance: 2,943; Referee: Kim Sung-Ho

15 April 8	Chunnam	2 – 2	Gwangju	Gwangyang, Jeonnam
17:00	Lee Hyun-Seung 27' (Assist by No.6); Lee Jong-Ho 81' (Assist by No.9)	Report	Jo Woo-jin 76'; João Paulo 88'	Stadium: Gwangyang Football Stadium; Attendance: 3,040; Referee: Song Min-Seok

22 April 9	Chunnam	3 – 1	Daejeon	Gwangyang, Jeonnam
15:00	Hong Jin-Gi 11' (Assist by No.3); Yoon Suk-Young 90' (Free kick); Shim Dong-Woon 90+4' (Assist by No.3)	Report	Kim Hyeung-Bum 74'	Stadium: Gwangyang Football Stadium; Attendance: 3,387; Referee: Choi Myung-Yong

29 April 10	Chunnam	0 – 0	Incheon	Gwangyang, Jeonnam
15:00	Lee Jong-Ho (red card) 15'	Report	Jeong Hyuk (yellow card) 45+2' (yellow-red card) 90'	Stadium: Gwangyang Football Stadium; Attendance: 3,126; Referee: Mae Ho-Young

6 May 11	Ulsan	1 – 0	Chunnam	Nam-gu, Ulsan
14:00	Go Seul-Ki 85'	Report		Stadium: Ulsan Munsu Football Stadium; Attendance: 10,097; Referee: An Yong-Hee

12 May 12	Sangju	1 – 2	Chunnam	Sangju, Gyeongbuk
15:00	Lee Sung-Jae 80'	Report	Kim Shin-young 53' (Assist by No.32); Ju Sung-Hwan 77' (Assist by No.8)	Stadium: Sangju Civic Stadium; Attendance: 1,995; Referee: Lee Min-Hu

19 May 13	Chunnam	1 – 0	Jeju	Gwangyang, Jeonnam
16:40	Son Seol-Min 14'	Report		Stadium: Gwangyang Football Stadium; Attendance: 3,583; Referee: Kim Jong-Hyuk

28 May 14	Busan	0 – 0	Chunnam	Yeonje-gu, Busan
15:00		Report		Stadium: Busan Asiad Stadium; Attendance: 8,714; Referee: Yoo Seon-Ho

14 June 15	Chunnam	0 – 3	Daegu	Gwangyang, Jeonnam
19:30		Report	Kim Dae-Yeol 41'; Leandrinho 49'; Song Je-Heon 76'	Stadium: Gwangyang Football Stadium; Attendance: 2,264; Referee: Woo Sang-Il

17 June 16	Daejeon	0 – 1	Chunnam	Yuseong-gu, Daejeon
17:00		Report	Shin Young-Jun 81' (Free kick)	Stadium: Daejeon World Cup Stadium; Attendance: 6,287; Referee: Kim Sang-Woo

23 June 17	Gwangju	6 – 0	Chunnam	Seo-gu, Gwangju
17:00	Park Min 4', 45+2'; Kim Dong-Sub 28', 43'; Kim Eun-sun 32'; João Paulo 65'	Report		Stadium: Gwangju World Cup Stadium; Attendance: 2,132; Referee: Kim Dae-Yong

27 June 18	Suwon	3 – 2	Chunnam	Suwon, Gyeonggi
19:30	Lee Yong-Rae 15'; Éverton 39'; Ristić 54'	Report	Kim Young-Uk 54' (Assist by No.9); Cornthwaite 75' (Assist by No.6)	Stadium: Suwon World Cup Stadium; Attendance: 14,008; Referee: Lee Jong-Guk

1 July 19	Chunnam	0 – 1	Ulsan Hyundai	Gwangyang, Jeonnam
20:00	Jung Myung-Oh (yellow card) 48'	Summary	Kim Seung-Yong (yellow card) 3'; Go Seul-Ki (yellow card) 56'; Lee Keun-Ho 60'	Stadium: Gwangyang Football Stadium; Attendance: 2,720; Referee: Lee Min-Hu

8 July 20	Seongnam Ilhwa Chunma	1 – 1	Chunnam	Seongnam
20:00	Hong Chul 51'	Summary	Kim Young-Uk (yellow card) 13'; Corthwaite (yellow card) 32'; Shin Young-Jun 47'	Stadium: Tancheon Sports Complex; Attendance: 2,169; Referee: Choi Myung-Yong

15 July 21	Chunnam	2 – 3	Busan IPark	Gwangyang, Jeonnam
20:00	Henan 3'; An Jae-Jun (yellow card) 64'; Lúcio Flávio 76'	Summary	Eder Luís de Carvalho (yellow card) 1'; Lim Sang-Hyub (yellow card) 21'; Bang Seung-Hwan 31'; Yoon Dong-Min 45+2'; Fágner (yellow card) 74'; Han Ji-Ho 84'	Stadium: Gwangyang Football Stadium; Attendance: 2,204; Referee: Kim Wan-Tae

21 July 22	Jeju United	6 – 0	Chunnam	Seogwipo, Jeju-do
20:00	Santos 18'; Song Jin-Hyung 34'; Jair 37'; Choi Won-Kwon (yellow card) 40'; Seo Dong-Hyun 45', 58', 87' (pen.)	Summary	Henan (yellow card) 84'; Jung Myung-Oh (yellow card) 85'	Stadium: Jeju World Cup Stadium; Attendance: 6.917; Referee: Ko Hyung-Jin

25 July 23	Chunnam	0 – 0	Sangju Sangmu Phoenix	Gwangyang, Jeonnam
20:30	Jung Myung-Oh (yellow card) 74'	Summary	Bang Dae-Jong (yellow card) 58'; Baek Ji-Hoon (yellow card) 62'	Stadium: Gwangyang Football Stadium; Attendance: 1,961; Referee: Yong-Hee Ahn

28 July 24	Chunnam	2 – 3	Jeonbuk	Gwangyang, Jeonnam
19:00	Robert Cornthwaite 25'; Hong Jin-Gi (yellow card) 42'; Lúcio Flávio (yellow card) 78'; Henan Silveira 82'	Report(Kor); Report(Eng)	Eninho 57' (pen.) (yellow card) 64'; Seo Sang-Min 71'; Lee Seung-Hyun 90+1' (yellow card) 90+3'	Stadium: Gwangyang Football Stadium; Attendance: 2,449; Referee: Lee Min-Hu

4 August 25	Incheon United	1 – 0	Chunnam	Incheon
20:00	Nam Joon-Jae (yellow card) 51' (goal) 58'; Han Kyo-Won (yellow card) 66'	Summary	Jung Myung-Oh (yellow card) 24'; Lee Sang-Ho (yellow card) 37'; Lee Hyun-Seung (yellow card) 39' (yellow-red card) 54'; Han Jae-Woong (yellow card) 66'	Stadium: Incheon Football Stadium; Attendance: 2,203; Referee: Sung-Ho Kim

9 August 26	Daegu FC	1 – 0	Chunnam	Daegu
20:00	Lee Jin-Ho 24'; Matheus (yellow card) 42'; Kim Dae-Yeol (yellow card) 49'	Summary	Hong Jin-Gi (yellow card) 26'; Corthwaite (yellow card) 58'; Park Sun-Yong (yellow card) 71'	Stadium: Daegu Stadium; Attendance: 3,596; Referee: Jong-Hyeok Kim

12 August 27	Chunnam	3 – 4	Chunnam	Gwangyang, Jeonnam
20:00	Lúcio Flávio 7' (pen.), 34'; Yoo Ji-No (yellow card) 20'; Jeong Shung-Hoon 82' (pen.); Henan Faria da Silveira (yellow card) 87'	Summary	Shin Hwa-Yong (yellow card) 5'; Hwang Jin-Sung 16'; Jin-Ryong Kim 50' (yellow card) 58'; Asamoah 52'; Park Sung-Ho 76'; Shin Kwang-Hoon (yellow card) 79'	Stadium: Gwangyang Football Stadium; Attendance: 2,281; Referee: Yong-Hee Ahn

19 August 28	Gyeongnam FC	0 – 1	Chunnam	Changwon, South Gyeongsang Province
20:00	Kang Min-hyuk (yellow card) 43'	Summary	Park Sun-Yong (yellow card) 59'; Lee Sang-Ho (yellow card) 60'; Yun Suk-Young (yellow card) 68'; Kim Young-Uk 84'; Ryu Won-Woo (yellow card) 90'	Stadium: Changwon Football Center; Attendance: 2,918; Referee: Jin-Ho Hong

==== League table ====
Pos	Team	Pld	W	D	L	GF	GA	GD	Pts
9	Incheon United	44	17	16	11	46	40	+6	67
10	Daegu FC	44	16	13	15	55	56	−1	61
11	Jeonnam Dragons	44	13	14	17	47	60	−13	53
12	Seongnam Ilhwa Chunma	44	14	10	20	47	56	−9	52
13	Daejeon Citizen	44	13	11	20	46	67	−21	50

Source: K League
Rules for classification: 1) Points; 2) Goal difference; 3) Goals scored.

==== Results summary ====
Overall								Home						Away					
Pld	W	D	L	GF	GA	GD	Pts	W	D	L	GF	GA	GD	W	D	L	GF	GA	GD
20	5	7	8	17	26	−9	22	3	4	3	10	10	0	2	3	5	7	16	−9

==== Results by round ====
Round	1	2	3	4	5	6	7	8	9	10	11	12	13	14	15	16	17	18	19	20	21	22	23	24	25	26	27	28	29	30	31	32	33	34	35	36	37	38	39	40	41	42	43	44
Ground	H	A	A	H	A	H	H	H	H	H	A	A	H	A	H	A	A	A	H	A	H	A	H	H	A	A	H	A	H	A														
Result	D	L	D	W	L	D	L	D	W	D	L	W	W	D	L	W	L	L	L	D																								
Position	9	14	13	9	11	11	13	13	12	11	11	10	9	8	10	9	10	11	11	11																								

Updated to match(es) played on 12 July 2012. Source: League Fixtures and Results
A = Away; H = Home; W = Win; D = Draw; L = Loss

=== Korean FA Cup ===
23 May Round of 32	Chunnam Dragons	1 – 0	Changwon City	Gwangyang, Jeonnam
19:00 KST	Cornthwaite 110' (Assist by No.14); Lee Jong-Ho (yellow card) 12' (yellow-red card) 118'			Stadium: Gwangyang Football Stadium; Attendance: 940; Referee: Kim Dong-In

20 June Round of 16	Jeonbuk Hyundai Motors	1 – 0	Chunnam Dragons	Jeonju, Jeonbuk
19:00 KST	Lee Dong-Gook 44'			Stadium: Jeonju World Cup Stadium; Attendance: 5,773; Referee: Kim Hee-Gon

== Squad statistics ==
=== Appearances ===
Statistics accurate as of match played 27 June 2012

No.	Nat.	Pos.	Name	League		FA Cup		Appearances		Goals
No.	Nat.	Pos.	Name	Apps	Goals	Apps	Goals	App (sub)	Total	Goals
1	(South Korea)	GK	Lee Woon-Jae	16	0	2	0	18 (0)	18	0
2	(South Korea)	DF	Park Sun-Yong	15	0	2	0	17 (0)	17	0
3	(South Korea)	DF	Yoon Suk-Young	14	1	2	0	16 (0)	16	1
4	(South Korea)	DF	Hong Jin-Gi	4 (2)	1	0	0	4 (2)	6	1
5	(South Korea)	DF	Lee Sang-Ho	4 (2)	0	0 (2)	0	4 (4)	8	0
6	(South Korea)	MF	Kim Young-Wook	10 (5)	1	2	0	12 (5)	17	1
7	(South Korea)	FW	Han Jae-Woong	13 (1)	0	2	0	15 (1)	16	0
8	(South Korea)	MF	Lee Hyun-Seung	14	1	1	0	15 (0)	15	1
9	(South Korea)	FW	Kim Shin-young	6 (4)	1	1	0	7 (4)	11	1
10	(Australia)	FW	Matt Simon	4 (2)	0	0 (1)	0	4 (3)	7	0
12	(South Korea)	MF	Lee Seung-Hee	4 (3)	0	0	0	4 (3)	7	0
13	(Australia)	DF	Robert Cornthwaite	12	1	2	1	14 (0)	14	2
14	(South Korea)	MF	Kim Geun-Cheol	6 (3)	0	0 (1)	0	6 (4)	10	0
15	(South Korea)	DF	Jung Myung-Oh	13	0	2	0	15 (0)	15	0
16	(South Korea)	MF	Yoo Ji-No	2 (1)	0	0	0	2 (1)	3	0
17	(South Korea)	FW	Lee Jong-Ho	12 (2)	3	1	0	13 (2)	15	3
18	(South Korea)	FW	Shim Dong-Woon	9 (3)	2	0	0	9 (3)	12	2
19	(South Korea)	FW	Shin Young-Jun	4 (2)	1	1 (1)	0	5 (3)	8	1
20	(South Korea)	DF	An Jae-Jun	15	1	2	0	17 (0)	17	1
21	(South Korea)	DF	Lee Wan	4	0	0	0	4 (0)	4	0
22	(South Korea)	GK	Ryu Won-Woo	2	0	0	0	2 (0)	2	0
23	(South Korea)	FW	Gong Young-Sun	2	0	0 (1)	0	2 (1)	3	0
24	(South Korea)	DF	Jeong Hyun-Yoon	2	0	0	0	2 (0)	2	0
25	(South Korea)	MF	Kim Dong-Chul	3	0	0	0	3 (0)	3	0
26	(South Korea)	FW	Ju Sung-Hwan	2 (9)	1	1 (1)	0	3 (10)	13	1
28	(South Korea)	DF	Jeong Jun-Yeon	1	0	0	0	1 (0)	1	0
29	(South Korea)	MF	Park Young-Jun	0 (1)	0	0	0	0 (1)	1	0
30	(South Korea)	DF	Jung Keun-Hee	3	0	0	0	3 (0)	3	0
31	(South Korea)	GK	Kim Dae-Ho	0	0	0	0	0	0	0
32	(South Korea)	MF	Son Seol-Min	3 (8)	2	1	0	4 (8)	12	2
33	(South Korea)	DF	Lee Seul-Chan	0 (2)	0	0	0	0 (2)	2	0
34	(South Korea)	MF	Jung Hoon-Chan	0 (1)	0	0	0	0 (1)	1	0
41	(South Korea)	GK	Song Ji-Yong	0	0	0	0	0	0	0
11	(Brazil)	MF	Silva (out)	0 (1)	0	0	0	0 (1)	1	0
27	(South Korea)	FW	Park Jung-Hoon (loan out)	0	0	0	0	0	0	0
77	(Brazil)	MF	Paulo (out)	0	0	0	0	0	0	0

=== Goals and assists ===
Rank	Nation	Number	Name	K-League		KFA Cup		Sum		Total
Rank	Nation	Number	Name	Goals	Assists	Goals	Assists	Goals	Assists	Total
1	(South Korea)	17	Lee Jong-Ho	3	1	0	0	3	1	4
=	(South Korea)	3	Yoon Suk-Young	1	3	0	0	1	3	4
=	(South Korea)	6	Kim Young-Wook	1	3	0	0	1	3	4
2	(South Korea)	32	Son Seol-Min	2	1	0	0	2	1	3
=	(Australia)	13	Robert Cornthwaite	2	1	1	0	2	1	3
=	(South Korea)	9	Kim Shin-young	1	2	0	0	1	2	3
3	(South Korea)	18	Shim Dong-Woon	2	0	0	0	2	0	2
=	(South Korea)	8	Lee Hyun-Seung	1	1	0	0	1	1	2
4	(South Korea)	4	Hong Jin-Gi	1	0	0	0	1	0	1
=	(South Korea)	19	Shin Young-Jun	1	0	0	0	1	0	1
=	(South Korea)	20	An Jae-Jun	1	0	0	0	1	0	1
=	(South Korea)	26	Ju Sung-Hwan	1	0	0	0	1	0	1
=	(South Korea)	7	Han Jae-Woong	0	1	0	0	0	1	1
=	(South Korea)	14	Kim Geun-Cheol	0	0	0	1	0	1	1
/	/	/	Own Goals	0	-	0	-	0	-	0
/	/	/	TOTALS	16	13	1	1	17	14	

=== Discipline ===
Position	Nation	Number	Name	K-League		KFA Cup		Total	
Position	Nation	Number	Name	Yellow card	Red card	Yellow card	Red card	Yellow card	Red card
DF	(South Korea)	2	Park Sun-Yong	3	0	1	0	4	0
DF	(South Korea)	3	Yoon Suk-Young	1	0	0	0	1	0
DF	(South Korea)	5	Lee Sang-Ho	1	0	0	0	1	0
MF	(South Korea)	6	Kim Young-Wook	3	0	0	0	3	0
MF	(South Korea)	7	Han Jae-Woong	3	0	0	0	3	0
MF	(South Korea)	8	Lee Hyun-Seung	2	0	0	0	2	0
FW	(Australia)	10	Matt Simon	2	0	0	0	2	0
MF	(South Korea)	12	Lee Seung-Hee	1	0	0	0	1	0
DF	(Australia)	13	Robert Cornthwaite	5	0	1	0	6	0
MF	(South Korea)	14	Kim Geun-Cheol	2	0	0	0	2	0
DF	(South Korea)	15	Jung Myung-Oh	2	0	1	0	3	0
MF	(South Korea)	16	Yoo Ji-No	2	0	0	0	2	0
FW	(South Korea)	17	Lee Jong-Ho	3	1	2	1	5	2
FW	(South Korea)	18	Shim Dong-Woon	1	0	0	0	1	0
DF	(South Korea)	20	An Jae-Jun	2	0	0	0	2	0
DF	(South Korea)	21	Lee Wan	1	0	0	0	1	0
DF	(South Korea)	25	Kim Dong-Chul	1	0	0	0	1	0
FW	(South Korea)	26	Ju Sung-Hwan	1	0	0	0	1	0
DF	(South Korea)	30	Jung Keun-Hee	1	0	0	0	1	0
MF	(South Korea)	32	Son Seol-Min	1	0	1	0	2	0
/	/	/	TOTALS	38	1	6	1	44	2
