= 2011 Jeonnam Dragons season =

Chunnam Dragons
2011 season
- Chairman: Lee Kun-Soo
- Manager: Jung Hae-Seong
- K-League: 7th
- Korean FA Cup: Quarterfinal
- League Cup: Group round
- Top goalscorer: League: Kim Myung-Joong (5); All: Kim Myung-Joong (5); Wesley (5)
- Highest home attendance: 19,247 vs Pohang (13 March)
- Lowest home attendance: 1,104 vs Konkuk University (18 May)
- Average home league attendance: 5,874
| Home colours | Away colours |

The 2011 season was Chunnam Dragons's seventeenth season in the K-League in South Korea. Chunnam Dragons competed in K-League, League Cup and Korean FA Cup.

== Current squad ==
Note: Flags indicate national team as defined under FIFA eligibility rules; some limited exceptions apply. Players may hold more than one non-FIFA nationality.

| No. | Pos. | Nation | Player |
|---|---|---|---|
| 1 | GK | KOR | Lee Woon-Jae (captain) |
| 2 | DF | KOR | Lee Sang-Ho |
| 3 | DF | KOR | Yoon Suk-Young |
| 4 | DF | KOR | Ahn Jae-Joon |
| 6 | MF | KOR | Kim Young-Wook |
| 7 | FW | KOR | Kim Myung-Joong |
| 8 | MF | KOR | Lee Hyun-Seung (on loan from Seoul) |
| 11 | FW | BRA | Índio |
| 12 | MF | KOR | Lee Seung-Hee |
| 13 | DF | AUS | Robert Cornthwaite |
| 15 | DF | KOR | Bang Dae-Jong |
| 17 | DF | KOR | Lee Jun-Ki |
| 18 | FW | BRA | Wesley (on loan from Corinthians) |
| 20 | MF | COL | Javier Reina (on loan from Cruzeiro) |
| 21 | GK | KOR | Ryu Won-Woo |
| 22 | DF | KOR | Lee Wan |
| 23 | FW | KOR | Gong Young-Sun |
| 24 | DF | KOR | Hwang Sun-Pil |
| 25 | DF | KOR | Hwang Do-Yeon |
| 26 | DF | KOR | Kim Jae-Hoon |
| 27 | MF | KOR | Yoo Ji-No |

| No. | Pos. | Nation | Player |
|---|---|---|---|
| 28 | DF | KOR | Jeong Jun-Yeon |
| 29 | FW | KOR | Kim Hyung-Pil |
| 30 | MF | KOR | Jung Keun-Hee |
| 31 | GK | KOR | Shin Jung-Hwan |
| 32 | DF | KOR | Kim Myung-Sun |
| 33 | FW | KOR | Lee Jong-Ho |
| 34 | MF | KOR | Shin Young-Jun |
| 35 | MF | KOR | Kim Sung-Kyun |
| 36 | FW | KOR | Kim Se-Hun |
| 37 | MF | KOR | Seo Ju-Hang |
| 38 | MF | KOR | Joo Hyun-Woo |
| 39 | MF | KOR | Park Young-Jun |
| 40 | DF | KOR | Baek Jin-Mok |
| 41 | GK | KOR | Kim Kyo-Bin |
| 42 | MF | KOR | Kang Jin-Kyu |
| 43 | MF | KOR | Kwon Hyung-Sun |
| 44 | FW | KOR | Jang Yong-Ik |
| 45 | MF | KOR | Lee Nam-Yong |
| 46 | MF | KOR | Lee Byeong-Yun |
| 50 | MF | KOR | Jung Kyung-ho |

== Match results ==
=== K-League ===
| Date Round | Home | Score | Away | Location |

| 6 March 1 | Jeonbuk Hyundai Motors | 0–1 | Chunnam Dragons | Jeonju, Jeonbuk |
| 15:00 UTC+9 | | Report | Gong Young-Sun 22' | Stadium: Jeonju World Cup Stadium; Attendance: 17,932; Referee: Lee Sam-Ho |

| 13 March 2 | Chunnam Dragons | 0–1 | Pohang Steelers | Gwangyang, Jeonnam |
| 15:00 UTC+9 | | Report | Asamoah 78' | Stadium: Gwangyang Stadium; Attendance: 19,247; Referee: Choi Myung-Yong |

| 20 March 3 | Chunnam Dragons | 3–0 | FC Seoul | Gwangyang, Jeonnam |
| 15:00 UTC+9 | Reina 35' (pen.); Lee Jong-Ho 76'; Kim Young-Wook 90' | Report | | Stadium: Gwangyang Stadium; Attendance: 3,622; Referee: Lee Sang-Yong |

| 2 April 4 | Daegu | 1–0 | Chunnam Dragons | Buk-gu, Daegu |
| 17:00 UTC+9 | Lee Ji-Nam 89' | Report | | Stadium: Daegu Civil Stadium; Attendance: 4,892; Referee: Lee Jong-Guk |

| 10 April 5 | Chunnam Dragons | 0–0 | Seongnam Ilhwa Chunma | Gwangyang, Jeonnam |
| 15:00 UTC+9 | | Report | | Stadium: Gwangyang Stadium; Attendance: 8,099; Referee: Lee Min-Hu |

| 17 April 6 | Gyeongnam | 1–2 | Chunnam Dragons | Changwon, Gyeongnam |
| 15:00 UTC+9 | Kim In-Han 31' | Report | Índio 73' (pen.), 90+2' | Stadium: Changwon Football Center; Attendance: 7,319; Referee: Ahn Yong-Hee |

| 23 April 7 | Chunnam Dragons | 0–1 | Sangju Sangmu Phoenix | Gwangyang, Jeonnam |
| 17:00 UTC+9 | | Report | Kim Jung-Woo 3' | Stadium: Gwangyang Stadium; Attendance: 7,809; Referee: Ko Keum-Bok |

| 30 April 8 | Busan I'Park | 3–0 | Chunnam Dragons | Yeonje-gu, Busan |
| 19:00 UTC+9 | Lim Sang-Hyub 33'; Lee Jung-Ho 37'; Han Sang-Woon 79' | Report | | Stadium: Busan Asiad Stadium; Attendance: 2,515; Referee: Ko Hyung-Jin |

| 7 May 9 | Suwon Samsung Bluewings | 1–2 | Chunnam Dragons | Suwon, Gyeonggi |
| 19:30 UTC+9 | Kwak Hee-Ju 22' | Report | Ji Dong-Won 47' (yellow card) 47'; Lee Hyun-Seung 56' | Stadium: Suwon World Cup Stadium; Attendance: 38,068; Referee: Choi Kwang-Bo |

| 14 May 10 | Chunnam Dragons | 2–0 | Daejeon Citizen | Gwangyang, Jeonnam |
| 17:00 UTC+9 | Shin Young-Jun 68'; Reina 88' | Report | Lee Sang-Hee (red card) 41' | Stadium: Gwangyang Stadium; Attendance: 4,149; Referee: Lee Min-Hu |

| 21 May 11 | Jeju United | 0–1 | Chunnam Dragons | Seogwipo, Jeju |
| 15:00 UTC+9 | | Report | Ji Dong-Won 62' | Stadium: Jeju World Cup Stadium; Attendance: 3,260; Referee: Lee Sam-Ho |

| 28 May 12 | Chunnam Dragons | 0–1 | Ulsan Hyundai | Gwangyang, Jeonnam |
| 19:00 UTC+9 | | Report | Kang Min-Soo 13' | Stadium: Gwangyang Stadium; Attendance: 7,828; Referee: Choi Kwang-Bo |

| 11 June 13 | Incheon United | 1–1 | Chunnam Dragons | Seo-gu, Incheon |
| 19:00 UTC+9 | Jang Won-Seok 88' | Report | Ji Dong-Won 28' | Stadium: Incheon Munhak Stadium; Attendance: 7,498; Referee: Kim Dong-Jin |

| 18 June 14 | Gwangju | 0–0 | Chunnam Dragons | Seo-gu, Gwangju |
| 19:00 UTC+9 | | Report | | Stadium: Gwangju World Cup Stadium; Attendance: 4,086; Referee: Lee Sam-Ho |

| 26 June 15 | Chunnam Dragons | 1–0 | Gangwon | Gwangyang, Jeonnam |
| 19:00 UTC+9 | Kim Myung-Joong 23' | Report | | Stadium: Gwangyang Stadium; Attendance: 2,924; Referee: Choi Myung-Yong |

| 2 July 16 | Daejeon Citizen | 4–4 | Chunnam Dragons | Yuseong-gu, Daejeon |
| 19:00 UTC+9 | Han Doc-Hee 14'; Han Jae-Woong 16', 23'; Wagner 79'; Hwang Jae-Hun (red card) 90+1' | Report | Wesley 45+1', 51'; Lee Wan 53'; Lee Byeong-Yun 90+4'; Cornthwaite (yellow card) 43' (red card) 90+1' | Stadium: Daejeon World Cup Stadium; Attendance: 6,761; Referee: Yoo Seon-Ho |

| 10 July 17 | Chunnam Dragons | 3–1 | Suwon Samsung Bluewings | Gwangyang, Jeonnam |
| 19:00 UTC+9 | Shin Young-Jun 61'; Yoon Suk-Young 74'; Wesley 83' | Report | Ristić 45+2' | Stadium: Gwangyang Stadium; Attendance: 5,080; Referee: Lee Min-Hu |

| 17 July 18 | Chunnam Dragons | 3–1 | Daegu | Gwangyang, Jeonnam |
| 19:00 UTC+9 | Kim Myung-Joong 1'; Shin Young-Jun 54'; Reina 45+8' (pen.) | Report | Song Je-Heon 36'; Kim Min-Koo (red card) 60'; Quirino (red card) 45+6' | Stadium: Gwangyang Stadium; Attendance: 6,955; Referee: Lee Sang-Yong |

| 23 July 19 | Ulsan Hyundai | 2–0 | Chunnam Dragons | Nam-gu, Ulsan |
| 19:00 UTC+9 | Kim Shin-Wook 39'; Seol Ki-Hyeon 58' | Report | | Stadium: Munsu Cup Stadium; Attendance: 32,157; Referee: Woo Sang-Il |

| 7 August 20 | Chunnam Dragons | 0–0 | Incheon United | Gwangyang, Jeonnam |
| 19:00 UTC+9 | | Report | Jeong Hyuk (red card) 33' | Stadium: Gwangyang Stadium; Attendance: 1,368; Referee: Hong Jin-Ho |

| 13 August 21 | FC Seoul | 1–0 | Chunnam Dragons | Mapo-gu, Seoul |
| 20:00 UTC+9 | Molina 90+3' | Report | | Stadium: Seoul World Cup Stadium; Attendance: 19,566; Referee: Choi Kwang-Bo |

| 21 August 22 | Chunnam Dragons | 1–1 | Busan I'Park | Gwangyang, Jeonnam |
| 19:00 UTC+9 | Kim Myung-Joong 35' | Report | Park Jong-Woo 22' | Stadium: Gwangyang Stadium; Attendance: 7,651; Referee: Moon JIn-Hee |

| 27 August 23 | Sangju Sangmu Phoenix | 0–1 | Chunnam Dragons | Sangju, Gyeongbuk |
| 19:30 UTC+9 | | Report | Lee Hyun-Seung 62' | Stadium: Sangju Stadium; Attendance: 9,153; Referee: Yoo Seon-Ho |

| 11 September 24 | Chunnam Dragons | 2–0 | Gyeongnam | Gwangyang, Jeonnam |
| 19:00 UTC+9 | Cornthwaite 59'; Lee Hyun-Seung 85' | Report | | Stadium: Gwangyang Stadium; Attendance: 3,479; Referee: Ko Keum-Bok |

| 18 September 25 | Chunnam Dragons | 1–1 | Jeju United | Gwangyang, Jeonnam |
| 19:00 UTC+9 | Kim Myung-Joong 46' | Report | Kim Eun-Jung 65' | Stadium: Gwangyang Stadium; Attendance: 8,249; Referee: Kim Dong-Jin |

| 25 September 26 | Seongnam Ilhwa Chunma | 3–2 | Chunnam Dragons | Seongnam, Gyeonggi |
| 15:00 UTC+9 | Héverton 20' (pen.), 88'; Éverton 43' | Report | Ahn Jae-Joon 45+1'; Hwang Do-Yeon 77' | Stadium: Tancheon Sports Complex; Attendance: 4,225; Referee: Lee Jong-Guk |

| 1 October 27 | Gangwon | 1–1 | Chunnam Dragons | Chuncheon, Gangwon |
| 19:00 UTC+9 | Oh Jae-Seok 90+2' | Report | Wesley 43' | Stadium: Chuncheon Stadium; Attendance: 3,543; Referee: Ko Keum-Bok |

| 16 October 28 | Chunnam Dragons | 0–2 | Gwangju | Gwangyang, Jeonnam |
| 15:00 UTC+9 | | Report | João Paulo 73'; Ahn Sung-Nam 90' | Stadium: Gwangyang Stadium; Attendance: 6,235; Referee: Lee Sam-Ho |

| 22 October 29 | Pohang Steelers | 1–1 | Chunnam Dragons | Pohang, Gyeongbuk |
| 15:00 UTC+9 | Mota 89' | Report | Lee Jong-Ho 53' (yellow card) 57' (yellow-red card) 77'; Cornthwaite (red card) 90+1' | Stadium: Steelyard Stadium; Attendance: 10,362; Referee: Yoo Sun-Ho |

| 30 October 30 | Chunnam Dragons | 1–1 | Jeonbuk Hyundai Motors | Gwangyang, Jeonnam |
| 15:00 UTC+9 | Kim Myung-Joong 17' | Report | Kim Dong-Chan 65' | Stadium: Gwangyang Stadium; Attendance: 10,115; Referee: Lee Sam-Ho |

==== League table ====
| Pos | Team | Pld | W | D | L | GF | GA | GD | Pts | Qualification |
|---|---|---|---|---|---|---|---|---|---|---|
| 5 | Busan IPark | 30 | 13 | 7 | 10 | 49 | 43 | +6 | 46 | Qualification for the K League playoffs first round |
| 6 | Ulsan Hyundai | 30 | 13 | 7 | 10 | 33 | 29 | +4 | 46 | Qualification for the K League playoffs first round |
| 7 | Jeonnam Dragons | 30 | 11 | 10 | 9 | 33 | 29 | +4 | 43 | |
| 8 | Gyeongnam FC | 30 | 12 | 6 | 12 | 41 | 40 | +1 | 42 | |
| 9 | Jeju United | 30 | 10 | 10 | 10 | 44 | 45 | −1 | 40 | |

Source: K League
Rules for classification: 1) Points; 2) Goal difference; 3) Goals scored

| Pos | Team | Qualification |
|---|---|---|
| 1 | Jeonbuk Hyundai Motors (C) | Qualification for the Champions League group stage |
| 2 | Ulsan Hyundai | Qualification for the Champions League group stage |
| 3 | Pohang Steelers | Qualification for the Champions League playoff round |
| 4 | Suwon Samsung Bluewings | |
| 5 | FC Seoul | |
| 6 | Busan IPark | |

Source: RSSSF
(C) Champions

==== Results summary ====
| Overall | | | | | | | | Home | | | | | | Away | | | | | |
| Pld | W | D | L | GF | GA | GD | Pts | W | D | L | GF | GA | GD | W | D | L | GF | GA | GD |
|---|---|---|---|---|---|---|---|---|---|---|---|---|---|---|---|---|---|---|---|
| 30 | 11 | 10 | 9 | 33 | 29 | +4 | 43 | 6 | 5 | 4 | 17 | 10 | +7 | 5 | 5 | 5 | 16 | 19 | −3 |

==== Results by round ====
| Round | 1 | 2 | 3 | 4 | 5 | 6 | 7 | 8 | 9 | 10 | 11 | 12 | 13 | 14 | 15 | 16 | 17 | 18 | 19 | 20 | 21 | 22 | 23 | 24 | 25 | 26 | 27 | 28 | 29 | 30 |
|---|---|---|---|---|---|---|---|---|---|---|---|---|---|---|---|---|---|---|---|---|---|---|---|---|---|---|---|---|---|---|
| Ground | A | H | H | A | H | A | H | A | A | H | A | H | A | A | H | A | H | H | A | H | A | H | A | H | H | A | A | H | A | H |
| Result | W | L | W | L | D | W | L | L | W | W | W | L | D | D | W | D | W | W | L | D | L | D | W | W | D | L | D | L | D | D |
| Position | 6 | 9 | 6 | 8 | 8 | 7 | 9 | 9 | 7 | 5 | 4 | 5 | 5 | 5 | 4 | 4 | 4 | 3 | 4 | 5 | 7 | 7 | 5 | 5 | 5 | 5 | 5 | 7 | 8 | 7 |

Updated to match(es) played on 30 October 2011. Source: League Fixtures and Results
A = Away; H = Home; W = Win; D = Draw; L = Loss

=== Korean FA Cup ===
| 18 May Round of 32 | Chunnam Dragons | 1–0 | Konkuk University | Gwangyang, Jeonnam |
| 19:00 UTC+9 | Índio 62' | | | Stadium: Gwangyang Football Stadium; Attendance: 1,104 |

| 15 June Round of 16 | Chunnam Dragons | 1–0 (a.e.t.) | Jeju United | Gwangyang, Jeonnam |
| 19:00 UTC+9 | Wesley 117' | | Park Jin-Ok (yellow card) 59' (yellow-red card) 111' | Stadium: Gwangyang Football Stadium; Attendance: 2,297; Referee: Kim Sang-Woo |

| 27 July Quarterfinal | Suwon Samsung Bluewings | 1–0 | Chunnam Dragons | Suwon, Gyeonggi |
| 19:00 UTC+9 | Lee Yong-Rae 25'; Choi Sung-Hwan (yellow card) 48' (yellow-red card) 64' | | | Stadium: Suwon World Cup Stadium; Attendance: 5,867; Referee: Kim Jong-Hyuk |

=== League Cup ===
| 16 March Group round | Chunnam Dragons | 1–0 | Sangju Sangmu Phoenix | Gwangyang, Jeonnam |
| 19:00 UTC+9 | Lee Hyun-Seung 20' | Report | | Stadium: Gwangyang Stadium; Attendance: 1,143; Referee: Kim Sung-Ho |

| 6 April Group round | Gangwon | 0–0 | Chunnam Dragons | Gangneung, Gangwon |
| 19:00 UTC+9 | | Report | | Stadium: Gangneung Stadium; Attendance: 5,150; Referee: Kim Jong-Hyuk |

| 20 April Group round | Gwangju | 0–2 | Chunnam Dragons | Seo-gu, Gwangju |
| 19:00 UTC+9 | | Report | Cornthwaite 33'; Nam Joon-Jae 90+3' | Stadium: Gwangju World Cup Stadium; Attendance: 847; Referee: Kim Sung-Ho |

| 4 May Group round | Chunnam Dragons | 1–0 | Ulsan Hyundai | Gwangyang, Jeonnam |
| 19:00 UTC+9 | Cornthwaite 51' | Report | | Stadium: Gwangyang Stadium; Attendance: 4,243; Referee: Woo Sang-Il |

| 11 May Group round | Busan I'Park | 1–0 | Chunnam Dragons | Yeonje-gu, Busan |
| 15:00 UTC+9 | Lee Jong-Won 32' | Report | | Stadium: Busan Asiad Stadium; Attendance: 602; Referee: Yoo Seon-Ho |

== Squad statistics ==
=== Appearances and goals ===
Statistics accurate as of match played 30 October 2011

Numbers in parentheses denote appearances as substitute.

| No. | Nat. | Pos. | Name | League | | FA Cup | | League Cup | | Total | |
| No. | Nat. | Pos. | Name | Apps | Goals | Apps | Goals | Apps | Goals | Apps | Goals |
|---|---|---|---|---|---|---|---|---|---|---|---|
| 1 | KOR | GK | Lee Woon-Jae | 30 | 0 | 3 | 0 | 4 | 0 | 37 (0) | 0 |
| 2 | KOR | DF | Lee Sang-Ho | 8 | 0 | 0 | 0 | 0 (1) | 0 | 8 (1) | 0 |
| 3 | KOR | DF | Yoon Suk-Young | 18 (1) | 1 | 2 | 0 | 1 (1) | 0 | 21 (2) | 1 |
| 4 | KOR | DF | Ahn Jae-Joon | 26 (1) | 1 | 2 | 0 | 0 | 0 | 28 (1) | 1 |
| 6 | KOR | MF | Kim Young-Wook | 4 (17) | 1 | 1 | 0 | 2 | 0 | 7 (17) | 1 |
| 7 | KOR | FW | Kim Myung-Joong | 22 (2) | 5 | 0 (1) | 0 | 3 | 0 | 25 (3) | 5 |
| 8 | KOR | MF | Lee Hyun-Seung | 21 (3) | 3 | 2 | 0 | 4 | 1 | 27 (3) | 4 |
| 11 | BRA | FW | Índio | 5 (10) | 2 | 1 (1) | 1 | 0 (2) | 0 | 6 (13) | 3 |
| 12 | KOR | MF | Lee Seung-Hee | 26 | 0 | 3 | 0 | 1 (1) | 0 | 30 (1) | 0 |
| 13 | AUS | DF | Robert Cornthwaite | 17 | 1 | 2 | 0 | 4 | 2 | 23 (0) | 3 |
| 15 | KOR | DF | Bang Dae-Jong | 6 (4) | 0 | 2 | 0 | 4 | 0 | 12 (4) | 0 |
| 17 | KOR | DF | Lee Jun-Ki | 2 (2) | 0 | 0 | 0 | 3 (1) | 0 | 5 (3) | 0 |
| 18 | BRA | FW | Wesley | 22 (2) | 4 | 2 | 1 | 1 | 0 | 25 (2) | 5 |
| 20 | COL | MF | Javier Reina | 20 (1) | 3 | 2 (1) | 0 | 1 | 0 | 23 (2) | 3 |
| 21 | KOR | GK | Ryu Won-Woo | 0 | 0 | 0 | 0 | 1 | 0 | 1 (0) | 0 |
| 22 | KOR | DF | Lee Wan | 16 | 1 | 2 | 0 | 2 | 0 | 20 (0) | 1 |
| 23 | KOR | FW | Gong Young-Sun | 7 | 1 | 0 | 0 | 1 | 0 | 8 (0) | 1 |
| 24 | KOR | DF | Hwang Sun-Pil | 0 | 0 | 0 | 0 | 1 | 0 | 1 (0) | 0 |
| 25 | KOR | DF | Hwang Do-Yeon | 6 (2) | 1 | 0 | 0 | 1 (1) | 0 | 7 (3) | 1 |
| 26 | KOR | DF | Kim Jae-Hoon | 0 | 0 | 0 | 0 | 1 | 0 | 1 (0) | 0 |
| 27 | KOR | MF | Yoo Ji-No | 15 (1) | 0 | 3 | 0 | 3 (1) | 0 | 21 (2) | 0 |
| 28 | KOR | MF | Jeong Jun-Yeon | 12 (2) | 0 | 0 (2) | 0 | 3 | 0 | 15 (4) | 0 |
| 29 | KOR | FW | Kim Hyung-Pil | 0 (2) | 0 | 0 | 0 | 0 (1) | 0 | 0 (3) | 0 |
| 30 | KOR | MF | Jung Keun-Hee | 1 | 0 | 0 | 0 | 0 | 0 | 1 (0) | 0 |
| 31 | KOR | GK | Shin Jung-Hwan | 0 | 0 | 0 | 0 | 0 | 0 | 0 | 0 |
| 32 | KOR | DF | Kim Myung-Sun | 0 | 0 | 0 | 0 | 0 | 0 | 0 | 0 |
| 33 | KOR | FW | Lee Jong-Ho | 3 (15) | 2 | 0 (1) | 0 | 2 (1) | 0 | 5 (17) | 2 |
| 34 | KOR | MF | Shin Young-Jun | 10 (9) | 3 | 2 (1) | 0 | 1 | 0 | 13 (10) | 3 |
| 35 | KOR | MF | Kim Sung-Kyun | 0 | 0 | 0 | 0 | 0 | 0 | 0 | 0 |
| 36 | KOR | FW | Kim Se-Hun | 0 | 0 | 0 | 0 | 0 | 0 | 0 | 0 |
| 37 | KOR | MF | Seo Ju-Hang | 0 | 0 | 0 | 0 | 0 | 0 | 0 | 0 |
| 38 | KOR | MF | Joo Hyun-Woo | 0 | 0 | 0 | 0 | 0 | 0 | 0 | 0 |
| 39 | KOR | MF | Park Young-Jun | 0 (2) | 0 | 0 (1) | 0 | 0 | 0 | 0 (3) | 0 |
| 40 | KOR | DF | Baek Jin-Mok | 0 | 0 | 0 | 0 | 0 | 0 | 0 | 0 |
| 41 | KOR | GK | Kim Kyo-Bin | 0 | 0 | 0 | 0 | 0 | 0 | 0 | 0 |
| 42 | KOR | MF | Kang Jin-Kyu | 0 | 0 | 0 | 0 | 1 | 0 | 1 (0) | 0 |
| 43 | KOR | MF | Kwon Hyung-Sun | 0 | 0 | 0 | 0 | 0 | 0 | 0 | 0 |
| 44 | KOR | FW | Jang Yong-Ik | 0 | 0 | 0 | 0 | 0 | 0 | 0 | 0 |
| 45 | KOR | MF | Lee Nam-Yong | 0 | 0 | 0 | 0 | 0 | 0 | 0 | 0 |
| 46 | KOR | MF | Lee Byeong-Yun | 0 (5) | 1 | 0 | 0 | 1 (1) | 0 | 1 (6) | 1 |
| 50 | KOR | MF | Jung Kyung-ho | 0 | 0 | 0 | 0 | 0 | 0 | 0 | 0 |
| 5 | KOR | MF | Kim Hyung-Ho (out) | 8 | 0 | 0 | 0 | 1 | 0 | 9 (0) | 0 |
| 9 | KOR | MF | Song Jung-Hyun (out) | 7 (2) | 0 | 1 (1) | 0 | 1 (2) | 0 | 9 (5) | 0 |
| 10 | KOR | FW | Ji Dong-Won (out) | 10 (1) | 3 | 1 (1) | 0 | 0 (2) | 0 | 11 (4) | 3 |
| 14 | KOR | MF | Baek Seung-Min (out) | 0 (1) | 0 | 0 | 0 | 0 | 0 | 0 (1) | 0 |
| 16 | KOR | FW | Jung Yoon-Sung (out) | 4 (1) | 0 | 2 | 0 | 3 | 0 | 9 (1) | 0 |
| 19 | KOR | FW | Nam Joon-Jae (out) | 4 (1) | 0 | 0 | 0 | 4 | 1 | 8 (1) | 1 |

=== Top scorers ===
| Rank | Nation | Number | Name | K-League | KFA Cup | League Cup | Total |
|---|---|---|---|---|---|---|---|
| 1 | (South Korea) | 7 | Kim Myung-Joong | 5 | 0 | 0 | 5 |
| = | (Brazil) | 18 | Wesley | 4 | 1 | 0 | 5 |
| 2 | (South Korea) | 8 | Lee Hyun-Seung | 3 | 0 | 1 | 4 |
| 3 | (South Korea) | 10 | Ji Dong-Won | 3 | 0 | 0 | 3 |
| = | (Colombia) | 20 | Javier Reina | 3 | 0 | 0 | 3 |
| = | (South Korea) | 34 | Shin Young-Jun | 3 | 0 | 0 | 3 |
| = | (Brazil) | 11 | Índio | 2 | 1 | 0 | 3 |
| = | (Australia) | 13 | Robert Cornthwaite | 1 | 0 | 2 | 3 |
| 4 | (South Korea) | 33 | Lee Jong-Ho | 2 | 0 | 0 | 2 |
| 5 | (South Korea) | 3 | Yoon Suk-Young | 1 | 0 | 0 | 1 |
| = | (South Korea) | 4 | Ahn Jae-Joon | 1 | 0 | 0 | 1 |
| = | (South Korea) | 6 | Kim Young-Wook | 1 | 0 | 0 | 1 |
| = | (South Korea) | 12 | Lee Seung-Hee | 1 | 0 | 0 | 1 |
| = | (South Korea) | 22 | Lee Wan | 1 | 0 | 0 | 1 |
| = | (South Korea) | 23 | Gong Young-Sun | 1 | 0 | 0 | 1 |
| = | (South Korea) | 46 | Lee Byeong-Yun | 1 | 0 | 0 | 1 |
| = | (South Korea) | 19 | Nam Joon-Jae | 0 | 0 | 1 | 1 |
| / | / | / | Own Goals | 0 | 0 | 0 | 0 |
| / | / | / | TOTALS | 33 | 2 | 4 | 39 |

=== Top assistors ===
| Rank | Nation | Number | Name | K-League | KFA Cup | League Cup | Total |
|---|---|---|---|---|---|---|---|
| 1 | (South Korea) | 33 | Lee Jong-Ho | 3 | 0 | 0 | 3 |
| 2 | (Australia) | 13 | Robert Cornthwaite | 2 | 0 | 0 | 2 |
| = | (South Korea) | 8 | Lee Hyun-Seung | 1 | 0 | 1 | 2 |
| = | (Brazil) | 11 | Índio | 1 | 1 | 0 | 2 |
| = | (Colombia) | 20 | Javier Reina | 1 | 0 | 1 | 2 |
| 3 | (South Korea) | 3 | Yoon Suk-Young | 1 | 0 | 0 | 1 |
| = | (South Korea) | 7 | Kim Myung-Joong | 1 | 0 | 0 | 1 |
| = | (South Korea) | 10 | Ji Dong-Won | 1 | 0 | 0 | 1 |
| = | (South Korea) | 12 | Lee Seung-Hee | 1 | 0 | 0 | 1 |
| = | (South Korea) | 16 | Jung Yoon-Sung | 1 | 0 | 0 | 1 |
| = | (Brazil) | 18 | Wesley | 1 | 0 | 0 | 1 |
| = | (South Korea) | 22 | Lee Wan | 1 | 0 | 0 | 1 |
| = | (South Korea) | 25 | Hwang Do-Yeon | 1 | 0 | 0 | 1 |
| = | (South Korea) | 27 | Yoo Ji-No | 1 | 0 | 0 | 1 |
| = | (South Korea) | 28 | Jeong Jun-Yeon | 1 | 0 | 0 | 1 |
| = | (South Korea) | 34 | Shin Young-Jun | 1 | 0 | 0 | 1 |
| = | (South Korea) | 22 | Lee Wan | 0 | 0 | 1 | 1 |
| / | / | / | TOTALS | 19 | 1 | 3 | 23 |

=== Discipline ===
| Position | Nation | Number | Name | K-League | | KFA Cup | | League Cup | | Total | |
| Position | Nation | Number | Name | Booked | Sent off (straight red) | Booked | Sent off (straight red) | Booked | Sent off (straight red) | Booked | Sent off (straight red) |
| MF | (South Korea) | 1 | Lee Woon-Jae | 0 | 0 | 1 | 0 | 0 | 0 | 1 | 0 |
| MF | (South Korea) | 3 | Yoon Suk-Young | 5 | 0 | 0 | 0 | 1 | 0 | 6 | 0 |
| DF | (South Korea) | 4 | Ahn Jae-Joon | 5 | 0 | 2 | 0 | 0 | 0 | 7 | 0 |
| MF | (South Korea) | 6 | Kim Young-Wook | 0 | 0 | 1 | 0 | 2 | 0 | 3 | 0 |
| FW | (South Korea) | 7 | Kim Myung-Joong | 4 | 0 | 0 | 0 | 1 | 0 | 5 | 0 |
| MF | (South Korea) | 8 | Lee Hyun-Seung | 2 | 0 | 1 | 0 | 0 | 0 | 3 | 0 |
| MF | (South Korea) | 9 | Song Jung-Hyun | 3 | 0 | 2 | 0 | 0 | 0 | 5 | 0 |
| FW | (South Korea) | 10 | Ji Dong-Won | 1 | 0 | 0 | 0 | 0 | 0 | 1 | 0 |
| FW | (Brazil) | 11 | Índio | 1 | 0 | 0 | 0 | 0 | 0 | 1 | 0 |
| MF | (South Korea) | 12 | Lee Seung-Hee | 8 | 0 | 2 | 0 | 0 | 0 | 10 | 0 |
| DF | (Australia) | 13 | Robert Cornthwaite | 5 | 2 | 0 | 0 | 1 | 0 | 6 | 2 |
| DF | (South Korea) | 15 | Bang Dae-Jong | 1 | 0 | 0 | 0 | 2 | 0 | 3 | 0 |
| FW | (South Korea) | 16 | Jung Yoon-Sung | 1 | 0 | 1 | 0 | 0 | 0 | 2 | 0 |
| FW | (Brazil) | 18 | Wesley | 5 | 0 | 2 | 0 | 1 | 0 | 8 | 0 |
| FW | (South Korea) | 19 | Nam Joon-Jae | 0 | 0 | 0 | 0 | 1 | 0 | 1 | 0 |
| MF | (Colombia) | 20 | Javier Reina | 2 | 0 | 0 | 0 | 0 | 0 | 2 | 0 |
| DF | (South Korea) | 22 | Lee Wan | 6 | 0 | 0 | 0 | 0 | 0 | 6 | 0 |
| DF | (South Korea) | 25 | Hwang Do-Yeon | 1 | 0 | 0 | 0 | 0 | 0 | 1 | 0 |
| DF | (South Korea) | 26 | Kim Jae-Hoon | 0 | 0 | 0 | 0 | 1 | 0 | 1 | 0 |
| MF | (South Korea) | 27 | Yoo Ji-No | 3 | 0 | 0 | 0 | 0 | 0 | 3 | 0 |
| FW | (South Korea) | 28 | Jeong Jun-Yeon | 0 | 0 | 0 | 0 | 1 | 0 | 1 | 0 |
| FW | (South Korea) | 33 | Lee Jong-Ho | 5 | 1 | 0 | 0 | 0 | 0 | 5 | 1 |
| MF | (South Korea) | 34 | Shin Young-Jun | 0 | 0 | 1 | 0 | 0 | 0 | 1 | 0 |
| MF | (South Korea) | 46 | Lee Byeong-Yun | 0 | 0 | 0 | 0 | 1 | 0 | 1 | 0 |
| / | / | / | TOTALS | 58 | 3 | 13 | 0 | 12 | 0 | 83 | 3 |

== Transfer ==
=== Out ===
- 30 June 2011 – (South Korea) Ji Dong-Won – Sunderland A.F.C.
- 7 July 2011 – (South Korea) Kim Hyung-Ho – Released (under arrest)
- 7 July 2011 – (South Korea) Song Jung-Hyun – Released (under arrest)
- 7 July 2011 – (South Korea) Jung Yoon-Sung – Released (under arrest)
- 7 July 2011 – (South Korea) Baek Seung-Min – Released (under indictment)
- July 2011 – (South Korea) Nam Joon-Jae – Jeju United FC
