= Kim Dong-chul =

Kim Dong-cheol or Kim Tong-ch'ŏl (김동철) may refer to:

- Kim Dong-chul (footballer)
- Kim Dong Chul (businessman), an American citizen previously incarcerated in North Korea
- Kim Dong-cheol, Assembly leader for the People's Party (South Korea, 2016)
