= Otto Warmbier =

American imprisoned in North Korea (1994–2017)

- Born: Otto Frederick Warmbier; December 12, 1994; Cincinnati, Ohio, U.S.
- Died: June 19, 2017 (aged 22); Cincinnati, Ohio, U.S.
- Resting place: Oak Hill Cemetery, Glendale, Ohio, U.S.
- Education: University of Virginia

Detention
- Country: North Korea
- Detained: January 2, 2016
- Charge: Subversion (through alleged attempted theft of a propaganda poster)
- Sentence: 15 years imprisonment with hard labor
- Released: June 12, 2017

Otto Frederick Warmbier (December 12, 1994 – June 19, 2017) was an American college student who was imprisoned in North Korea in 2016 on charges of subversion. In June 2017, he was released by North Korea in a vegetative state, and died shortly thereafter.

Warmbier entered North Korea as part of a guided tour group on December 29, 2015. On January 2, 2016, he was arrested at Pyongyang International Airport while awaiting departure from North Korea. He was convicted of attempting to steal a propaganda poster from his hotel, for which he was sentenced to 15 years of imprisonment with hard labor.

Shortly after his sentencing in March 2016, Warmbier suffered a severe neurological injury from an unknown cause and was induced into a vegetative state, which lasted until his death. North Korean authorities did not disclose his medical condition until June 2017, when they announced he had fallen into a coma as a result of botulism and a sleeping pill. He was freed later that month, still in a vegetative state, after 17 months in captivity. He was sent back to the United States and arrived in Cincinnati, Ohio, on June 13, 2017. He was taken to the University of Cincinnati Medical Center for immediate evaluation and treatment.

Warmbier never recovered from his injury. Due to the severity of his condition, his parents requested his feeding tube be removed. He died on June 19, 2017, six days after his return to the United States. A coroner's report stated that he had died from an unknown injury causing lack of oxygen to the brain. Non-invasive internal scans found no signs of fractures or trauma to his skull.

In 2018, a U.S. federal court found the North Korean government liable for Warmbier's alleged torture and death, in a default judgment in favor of Warmbier's parents after North Korea did not contest the case.

== Early life ==
Otto Frederick Warmbier was born in Cincinnati, Ohio, on December 12, 1994. He was the eldest of Cynthia "Cindy" (née Garber) and Frederick Warmbier's three children. Warmbier's mother was Jewish, and he identified as Jewish. He attended Wyoming High School in Wyoming, Ohio, where he was considered popular and studious, and graduated in 2013 as salutatorian. After that, he enrolled at the University of Virginia, where he was pursuing a double major degree in commerce and economics, and did a foreign exchange at the London School of Economics. His minor was in global sustainability. Warmbier was active in Hillel on his college campus. He was a member of the Theta Chi fraternity. Being interested in other cultures, he had visited Israel (on a Birthright trip), Europe, Cuba, and Ecuador.

== Visit to North Korea ==
Warmbier was scheduled to undertake a study-abroad program in Hong Kong in early 2016, and decided to visit North Korea en route over the New Year period. He booked a tour of North Korea with Young Pioneer Tours, a budget tour operator based in China founded by two Westerners, self-described as "destinations your mother would rather you stayed away from". Warmbier's father, Fred, said that Young Pioneer advertised the trip as safe for U.S. citizens and that Otto was "curious about their culture [...] he wanted to meet the people of North Korea."

On December 29, 2015, Warmbier flew via Beijing to North Korea with his tour group, which included ten other US citizens and people from several other nations, for a five-day New Year tour. The tour group celebrated New Year's Eve by carousing in Pyongyang's Kim Il Sung Square before returning to the Yanggakdo International Hotel, where some continued consuming alcohol. According to his trial, Warmbier tried to steal a propaganda banner from a staff-only area of the hotel just before 2:00 am on January 1, 2016.

=== Arrest ===
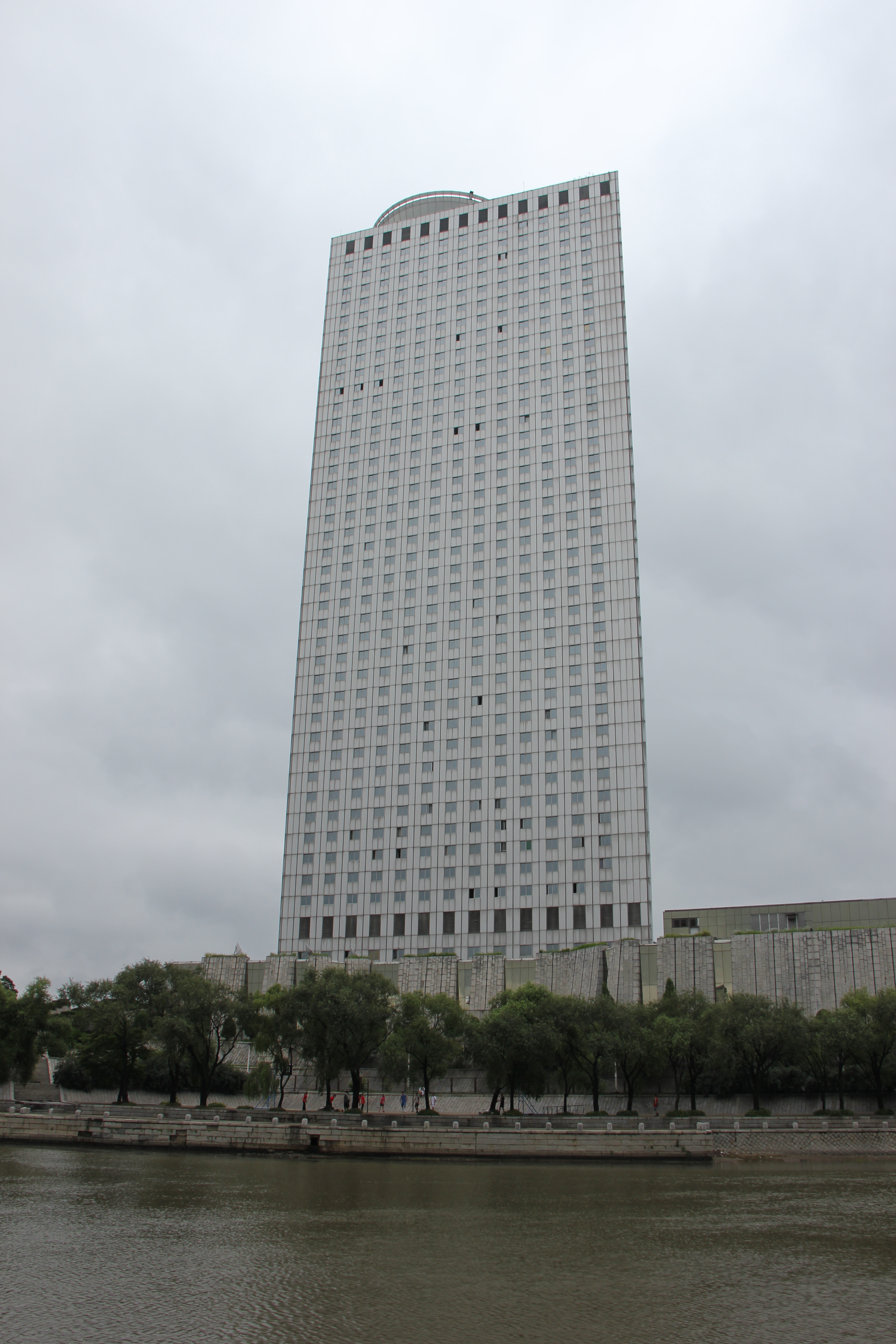
The Yanggakdo International Hotel in Pyongyang, where the alleged attempted theft took place

On January 2, 2016, Warmbier was arrested at Pyongyang International Airport while awaiting departure from North Korea. Danny Gratton, a British member of Warmbier's tour group, witnessed the arrest. He said:

No words were spoken. Two guards just came over and simply tapped Otto on the shoulder and led him away. I just said kind of quite nervously, 'Well, that's the last we'll see of you.' There's a great irony in those words. That was it. That was the last physical time I saw Otto, ever. Otto didn't resist. He didn't look scared. He sort of half-smiled.

When the group's plane was about to leave the terminal, an official came aboard and announced, "Otto is very sick and has been taken to the hospital." Some media reports indicated that Warmbier spoke by phone to a Young Pioneer tour guide following his arrest, but this was denied by a Young Pioneer spokesman who told BBC News that "none of its employees had direct contact with Otto after he was escorted away". The others in his tour group left the country without incident.

North Korea's state-run Korean Central News Agency (KCNA) initially announced that Warmbier had been detained for "a hostile act against the state", without specifying details. North Korea refused to elaborate on the nature of his wrongdoing for six weeks, although a Young Pioneer spokeswoman told Reuters there had been an "incident" at the Yanggakdo Hotel. In a press conference on February 29, 2016, Warmbier, reading from a prepared statement, confessed that he had attempted to steal a propaganda poster from a restricted staff-only area of the second floor (Note: Although there was media speculation that Warmbier had trespassed onto the staff-only fifth floor of the hotel, Warmbier's confession stated that he removed the poster from the hotel's second floor.) of the Yanggakdo Hotel to take home. The poster said (in Korean), "Let's arm ourselves strongly with Kim Jong Il's patriotism!". Damaging or stealing such items with the name or image of a North Korean leader is considered a serious crime by the North Korean government.

It is not known whether the confession was forced, as Warmbier never recovered after his return to the U.S. However, at least one observer said that he was "clearly under duress". Former prisoners of North Korea have later recanted their confessions after their release, stating they were made under duress.

Warmbier's confession also stated that he had plotted to steal the poster at the behest of a Methodist church in his hometown and the Z Society, a secret society at the University of Virginia that he wished to join, both of which he said were allied with the Central Intelligence Agency. These claims, which Time called "fanciful" and "implausible", were disputed by both the church and the Z Society. The New York Times remarked that "the unlikely nature of the details suggested the script had been written by Mr. Warmbier's North Korean interrogators". The Israeli-born U.S. negotiator Mickey Bergman said that Warmbier's family were advised to maintain silence about his Jewish heritage while he was under arrest, as negotiators believed that publicly repudiating Warmbier's purported affiliation with a Methodist church would antagonize the North Korean government.

=== Trial and conviction ===
On March 16, 2016, a few hours after U.S. envoy Bill Richardson met in New York with two North Korean diplomats from the United Nations office to press for Warmbier's release, Warmbier was tried and convicted in North Korea's Supreme Court. He was charged with subversion under Article 60 of North Korea's Criminal Code. The court held that he had committed a crime "pursuant to the U.S. government's hostile policy toward [North Korea], in a bid to impair the unity of its people after entering it as a tourist". Evidence at his trial, which lasted one hour, included his confession, CCTV footage, fingerprint evidence, and witness testimony. The CCTV footage showed a man, identified as Warmbier by his North Korean guide, entering the staff-only area. On March 18, KCNA released a brief low-resolution video, time-stamped 1:57 a.m., showing a figure removing a banner from a wall and placing it on the floor.

Warmbier stated in his confession that he abandoned the banner after discovering it as it was too large to carry away. A hotel staff member told the court: "When I got off work, there was nothing amiss. But when I returned, I thought someone had deliberately taken the slogan down, so I mobilized security to prevent damage to it and reported it to the authorities." Warmbier's confession reads as follows:

I never should have allowed myself to be allured, by the United States administration, to commit a crime in this country. I wish that the United States administration never manipulate people like myself in the future, to commit crimes against foreign countries. I entirely beg you, people and government of the DPR Korea, for your forgiveness. Please! I have made the worst mistake of my life!

Warmbier was sentenced to 15 years of hard labor. Human Rights Watch called the hearing a kangaroo court and described the sentencing as "outrageous and shocking". U.S. State Department spokesman Mark Toner stated it was clear that North Korea arrested American citizens for political purposes despite its claims to the contrary.

== Release ==
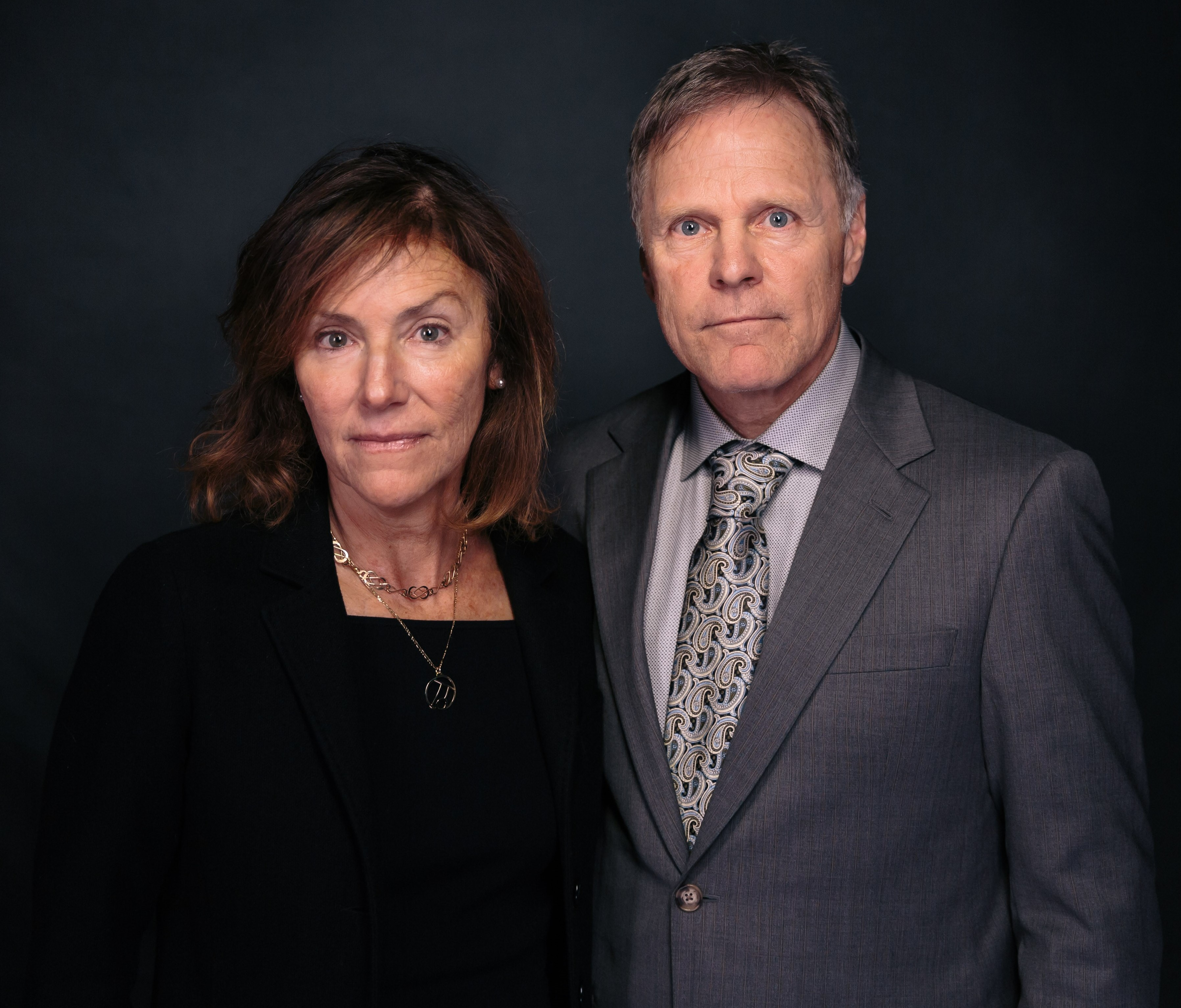
Cindy and Fred Warmbier in 2018

Fred and Cindy Warmbier met with numerous Obama administration officials, including then Secretary of State John Kerry, and with the Swedish ambassador, Torkel Stiernlöf, who served as an interlocutor between the U.S. and North Korea. In May 2017, Fred Warmbier said the Obama administration had encouraged them to keep a low profile about their son's situation, but that he and his wife wanted their son to be part of any negotiations between the United States and North Korea.

On June 13, 2017, Secretary of State Rex Tillerson announced that North Korea had released Warmbier. Tillerson also announced that the State Department had secured Warmbier's release at the direction of President Donald Trump, and the State Department would continue discussing three other detained Americans with North Korea. (Note: The three detainees – Kim Sang-duk, Kim Dong Chul, and Kim Hak Song – all Korean Americans who had been working in North Korea prior to their arrests, were subsequently released in May 2018 prior to the first North Korea–United States summit.)

Subsequent media reports revealed that, at a meeting in New York on June 6, North Korean officials had advised U.S. State Department Special Representative Joseph Yun that Warmbier had contracted food-borne botulism shortly after his sentencing and had fallen into a coma after taking a sleeping pill. A delegation headed by Yun flew to Pyongyang to oversee Warmbier's repatriation.

After 17 months in detention, Warmbier, still in a vegetative state, was medically evacuated from the Pyongyang Friendship Hospital to Cincinnati, arriving on the evening of June 13. He was taken to the University of Cincinnati Medical Center, where doctors tried to determine what caused his injury and if there were signs of recovery.

=== Medical condition ===
Warmbier's physicians at the University of Cincinnati Medical Center stated that he was in "a state of unresponsive wakefulness", commonly known as persistent vegetative state. He was able to breathe on his own and blink his eyes, but otherwise showed no signs of awareness of his environment, such as understanding language, nor did he initiate any purposeful movements. Michael Flueckiger, a medical director who was part of the team that took Warmbier back to the U.S., stated that Warmbier had received good medical care at the hospital in Pyongyang. Medical records from North Korea showed that Warmbier had been in this state since April 2016, one month after his conviction.

During his release, the North Koreans provided a disk containing two magnetic resonance imaging brain scans, dated April and July 2016, showing damage to the brain. According to his medical team, brain-scans revealed Warmbier had suffered extensive loss of tissue throughout his brain, consistent with a cardiopulmonary event that caused the brain to be deprived of oxygen. Doctors said they did not know what may have caused a cardiac arrest, if one had occurred, but that it could have been triggered by a respiratory arrest, while a neurointensive care specialist at the hospital stated that there was no evidence of botulism. His doctors found no evidence of physical abuse or torture; scans of Warmbier's neck and head were normal outside of the brain injury, however he did have a pronounced scar on his foot. They added that they did not see any signs of healing or previously healed fractures, believing that "for somebody who had been bedridden for more than a year, that his body was in excellent condition, that his skin was in excellent condition".

== Death ==
After his parents requested his feeding tube be removed, Warmbier died in the hospital at 2:20 p.m. on June 19, 2017, at the age of 22. His family issued a statement expressing their sadness, thanking the hospital staff for their actions. Then-president Donald Trump issued a statement regarding Warmbier's death: "There is nothing more tragic for a parent than to lose a child in the prime of life. Our thoughts and prayers are with Otto's family and friends, and all who loved him." He added: "The United States once again condemns the brutality of the North Korean regime as we mourn its latest victim."

North Korean officials said their country was the "biggest victim" of Warmbier's death as a result of a "smear campaign", stating their treatment of him was "humanitarian". A spokesman added:

Although we had no reason at all to show mercy to such a criminal of the enemy state, we provided him with medical treatments and care with all sincerity on humanitarian basis until his return to the U.S., considering that his health got worse.

At the request of Warmbier's family, an autopsy was not performed, and only a postmortem external examination was conducted. Doctors speculated that the cause of death could have been a blood clot, pneumonia, sepsis, or kidney failure. Sleeping pills could have caused Warmbier to stop breathing if he had botulism and was paralyzed from it. The University of Cincinnati doctors found no evidence of botulism, but several neurologists said that botulism could not be ruled out, given the length of time before Warmbier's return to the U.S. The U.S. coroner who examined Warmbier's body after his death said that Warmbier's body showed no obvious signs of torture and that Warmbier had died due to brain damage following an interruption of blood flow. The coroner also said his skin condition was excellent, and his muscle volume was reasonably good given the circumstances.

Warmbier's funeral was held on June 22, 2017, at Wyoming High School; more than 2,500 mourners attended. He is buried at Oak Hill Cemetery in Glendale, Ohio, and students tied ribbons on every tree and pole along the three-mile (five-kilometer) route taken by the funeral procession from the high school to the cemetery.

== Public reactions ==
Public reactions to Warmbier's death were strong. U.S. senators John McCain and Marco Rubio called it "murder", as did representative Adam Schiff. GQ journalist Doug Bock Clark suggested that Warmbier might have attempted suicide some time after his sentencing. Nikki Haley, U.S. ambassador to the United Nations, said, "Countless innocent men and women have died at the hands of the North Korean criminals, but the singular case of Otto Warmbier touches the American heart like no other". South Korean president Moon Jae-in conveyed his condolences to Warmbier's family, and said "We cannot know for sure that North Korea killed Mr. Warmbier. But I believe it is quite clear that they have a heavy responsibility in the process that led to Mr. Warmbier's death".

Michael Kirby, chairman of the United Nations commission of inquiry on human rights in North Korea, wrote: "A young American's fate becomes a metaphor, a kind of symbol, of a big story about thousands of nameless statistics locked up and oppressed in North Korea. They are voiceless. But Otto Warmbier speaks of their suffering from his grave. He reminds the world of the human rights wrongs in North Korea. He joins the voices of the many witnesses who gave testimony to the U.N. commission."

The media reported on a wide range of other reactions. Some commentators criticized the Obama administration for alleged inaction in Warmbier's case, a claim disputed by Obama spokesman Ned Price. Some found fault with Young Pioneer Tours (the travel agency that organized Warmbier's North Korea trip) for its alleged drinking culture and for understating the risks of travel to North Korea. Following Warmbier's death, Young Pioneer announced it would no longer accept American citizens on its tours. It also amended its website to emphasize that North Korea has "what amount to extremely strict lèse-majesté laws".

Some questioned the wisdom of Warmbier's decision to visit North Korea in the first instance. Robert R. King, former U.S. envoy for North Korea human rights issues, remarked that Warmbier had disregarded the U.S. State Department's travel advisory, which "strongly warns" American citizens not to travel to North Korea. Some analysts suggested that Warmbier had been framed by the North Korean government for removing the propaganda poster, while others concluded that he was guilty of doing so, and in some cases criticized Warmbier for breaking the law as an American visiting a hostile country. Some commentators pointed to Warmbier's perceived naiveté and white privilege as contributing to his fate, while others characterized such observations as insensitive, inappropriate and racist.

== Aftermath ==
In July 2017, the U.S. government announced that it would ban American tourists from visiting North Korea as of September 1, 2017, with Warmbier's detention given as one of the reasons.

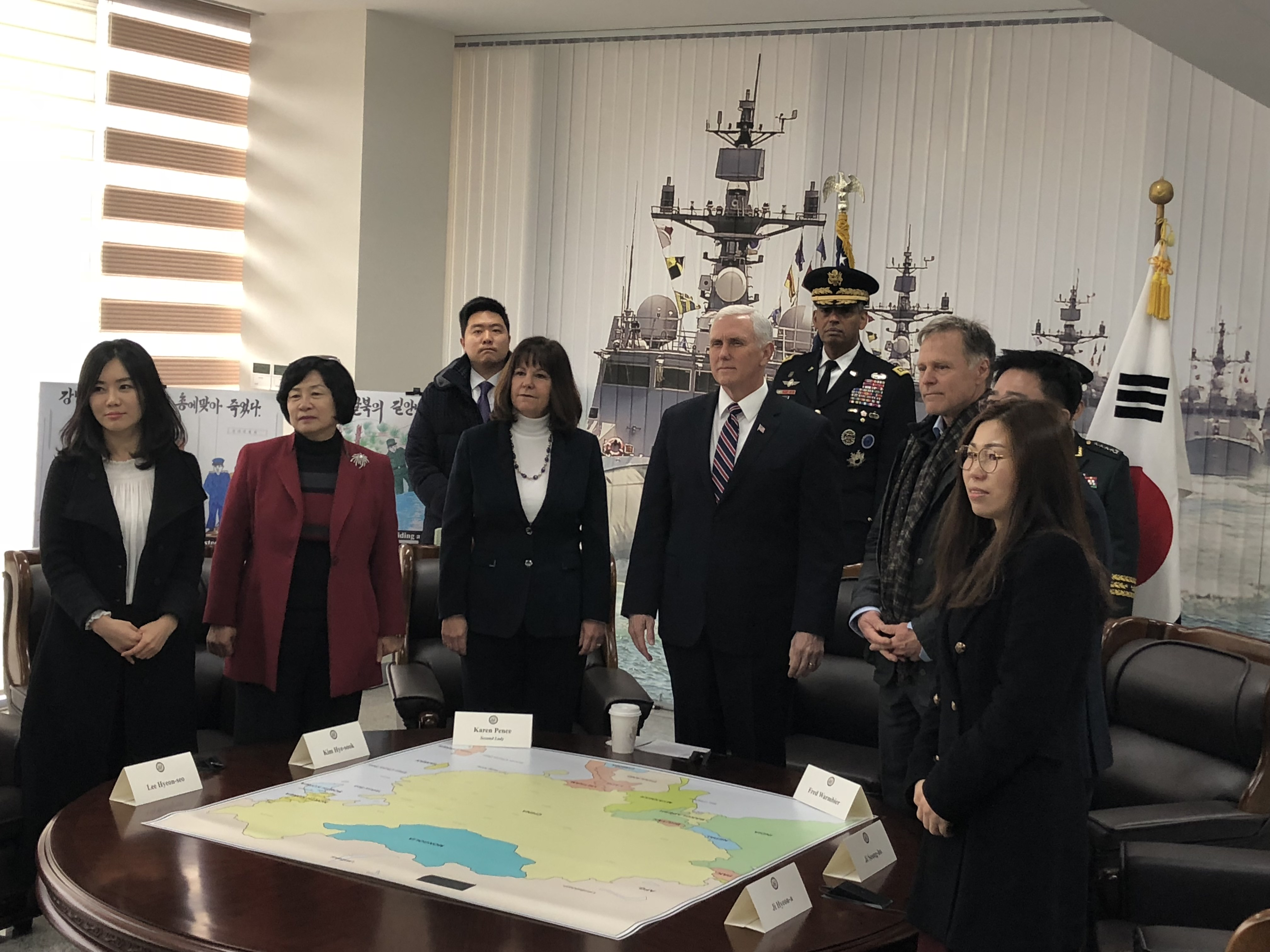
U.S. Vice President Mike Pence and his wife Karen along with Fred Warmbier, USFK commander Vincent K. Brooks, and North Korean defectors at the ROKS Cheonan Memorial, February 2018

In his speech to the United Nations General Assembly on September 19, 2017, President Donald Trump mentioned Warmbier while lambasting North Korea as a rogue state. One week later, Trump posted on Twitter that Warmbier was "tortured beyond belief" by North Korea. His post followed a televised interview given by Warmbier's parents, in which they spoke of their son's death and expressed their wish for North Korea to be relisted (Note: North Korea was first designated as a state sponsor of terrorism by the U.S. government in 1988. It was removed from that list on October 11, 2008, and was re-added on November 20, 2017.) as a state-sponsor of terrorism.

On November 20, 2017, the U.S. Department of State relisted North Korea as a state-sponsor of terrorism. President Trump mentioned Warmbier's case when making this announcement.

In February 2019, at the conclusion of the second North Korea–United States summit, Trump announced that he had discussed Warmbier's treatment with North Korean leader Kim Jong Un, and said, "He [Kim] tells me he didn't know about it, and I will take him at his word". President Trump also argued that it would not have been to Kim's advantage to allow Warmbier to be treated poorly. Following President Trump's comments, Warmbier's parents released a statement, saying, "We have been respectful during this summit process. Now we must speak out. Kim and his evil regime are responsible for the death of our son Otto. Kim and his evil regime are responsible for unimaginable cruelty and inhumanity. No excuse or lavish praise can change that". Trump later said his remarks had been "misinterpreted" and added, "Of course I hold North Korea responsible for Otto's mistreatment and death", without mentioning Kim specifically.

In April 2019, The Washington Post reported previously undisclosed news that at the time of Warmbier's medical evacuation, North Korean officials had presented the U.S. delegation that repatriated him with a bill for US$2 million for his medical treatment while in Pyongyang. President Trump denied that the U.S. government had paid the bill. In December 2022, the U.S. Congress passed the Otto Warmbier Countering North Korean Censorship and Surveillance Act of 2021.

=== Lawsuit ===
Warmbier v. DPRK
- Court: United States District Court for the District of Columbia
- Full case name: CYNTHIA WARMBIER, et al., Plaintiffs, v. DEMOCRATIC PEOPLE'S REPUBLIC OF KOREA, Defendant
- Decided: December 10, 2018
- Citation: Civil Action No. 18-977 (BAH)

Case opinions
- North Korea found liable (by default judgment) for the torture, hostage taking, and extrajudicial killing of Otto Warmbier. $501 million in monetary damages awarded to the Warmbier family.
- Decision by: Chief Judge Beryl A. Howell

In April 2018, Warmbier's parents sued the North Korean government in the United States federal district court in Washington, D.C., accusing North Korea of torture and murder. Although private citizens are not usually able to sue foreign nations and their governments, damages may be paid to the victims of nations designated as state-sponsors of terrorism, like North Korea, from a special fund established by the United States Congress.

North Korea did not contest the case in court, although the director of the Pyongyang hospital where Warmbier had been treated issued a press-release reaffirming North Korea's denials that Warmbier had been tortured by the government.

Although the coroner's post-mortem examination had found that Warmbier's teeth were "natural and in good repair", two of Warmbier's private dentists testified that his post-mortem dental x-rays indicated that some of his lower teeth were bent backward when compared to his earlier dental records, consistent with "some sort of impact". A scar on Warmbier's foot, previously described by the coroner as "inexplicable", was held up by some expert witnesses as evidence that Warmbier may have been subjected to torture (such as electric shock) by his North Korean jailers.

On December 24, 2018, Chief Judge Beryl A. Howell handed down a default judgment (Note: The failure of the defendant to respond to the lawsuit allows the plaintiff to request to the court that the original damages pleaded in the complaint be awarded without going to trial and without having those damages contested.) ordering North Korea to pay $501 million in damages. A copy of the judgment was couriered by the court to North Korea's foreign ministry in Pyongyang; however, it was returned to the US court that sent it. VOA News remarked that "it is unlikely North Korea will pay the judgment since there is no mechanism to force it to do so", but that the Warmbier family "may nonetheless be able to recoup damages through a Justice-Department-administered fund for victims of state-sponsored acts of terrorism, and may look to seize other assets held by the country outside of North Korea".

In July 2019, the Warmbier family filed a claim on a North Korean cargo ship, Wise Honest, that had been judicially seized in Indonesia by the U.S. government in May 2019 for allegedly transporting and selling North Korean coal in violation of international sanctions. U.S. federal judges ordered that the vessel be sold to compensate the Warmbiers as well as the family of Kim Dong-shik, a Korean-American missionary believed to have died in North Korea after being abducted from China in January 2000. (Note: The Wise Honest was sold for scrap on September 12, 2019, in a sealed-bid auction. According to the Navy Times, the ship would have been worth about $1.7 million as scrap, although the successful bidder likely paid a considerably lower figure to haul it away.)

In January 2022, a New York court ruled that the Warmbiers be awarded $240,000 in funds seized from the Korea Kwangson Banking Corporation, a North Korean bank.

=== Scholarship ===
In 2022, his parents awarded a scholarship in Otto Warmbier's name to a North Korean defector, Lee Hyeon-seo .

=== Allegations from other Korean witnesses ===
In 2019, Kim Dong Chul, a Korean-American businessman detained in North Korea at the same time as Warmbier but released to the U.S. in 2018, said he had witnessed a young American man, presumably Warmbier, "almost fainting, being dragged across a hallway by investigators with his head and face soaked with water". Kim suggested Warmbier may have been a victim of water-torture during his interrogation, as Kim himself had suffered similar treatment during captivity.

== See also ==
- Hostage diplomacy
- Katherine Ann Dettwyler § Comments on death of Otto Warmbier
- List of foreign nationals detained in North Korea
- List of unsolved deaths
- North Korea–United States relations
- The Nightly Show with Larry Wilmore § Otto Warmbier
- Tourism in North Korea
