= Dong-chul =

- Hangul: 동철
- RR: Dongcheol
- MR: Tongch'ŏl

Dong-chul is a Korean given name.

People with this name include:

- Kim Dong Chul (businessman) (born 1953), Korean-American businessman and spy
- Shin Dong-Chul (born 1961), South Korean football player
- Brave Brothers (born Kang Dong-chul, 1979), South Korean rapper
- Kim Dong-chul (footballer) (born 1990), South Korean football player

Fictional characters with this name include:

- Jo Dong-chul from 2013 film The Suspect
- Lee Dong-chul from 2008 television series East of Eden
- Seok Dong-chul from 2017 television series Save Me

== See also ==
- List of Korean given names
