= Bak Seon-yeong =

Bak Seon-yeong is the Revised Romanisation spelling of a Korean name (박선영) with various English spellings, among them Park Sun-young. It may refer to:

- Hyomin (Park Sun-young, born 1989), South Korean female singer, member of girl group T-ara
- Luna (South Korean singer) (Park Sun-young, born 1993), South Korean female singer, member of girl group f(x)
- Bak Seon-yeong (voice actress) (born 1970), South Korean voice actress
- Park Sun-young (actress) (born 1976), South Korean actress
- Park Sun-young (badminton) (born 1985), South Korean badminton player

== See also ==
- Park Sun-yong (born 1989), South Korean footballer
