= Park Sun-ju =

South Korean footballer (born 1993)

Personal information
- Date of birth: 26 March 1993 (age 33)
- Place of birth: South Korea
- Height: 1.74 m (5 ft 8 1/2 in)
- Positions: Full back; winger

Team information
- Current team: Gangneung Citizen
- Number: 22

Youth career
- 2012: Yonsei University

Senior career*
Years	Team	Apps	(Gls)
2013–2016	Pohang Steelers	44	(0)
2017–2018	Gangwon FC	24	(1)
2019	Gwangju FC	14	(0)
2020	Cheonan City	7	(0)
2021–	Gangneung Citizen	75	(1)

International career
2009	South Korea U-17		
- * Club domestic league appearances and goals as of 11 November 2019

- Park Sun-ju
- Hangul: 박선주
- RR: Bak Seonju
- MR: Pak Sŏnju

Park Sun-ju (Korean: 박선주; born 26 March 1993) is a South Korean footballer who plays as full back for Gangneung Citizen FC. His brother Park Sun-yong is also a footballer.

== Career ==
He joined Pohang Steelers before the 2013 season started.
