= Troy Collings =

New Zealand businessman (died 2020)

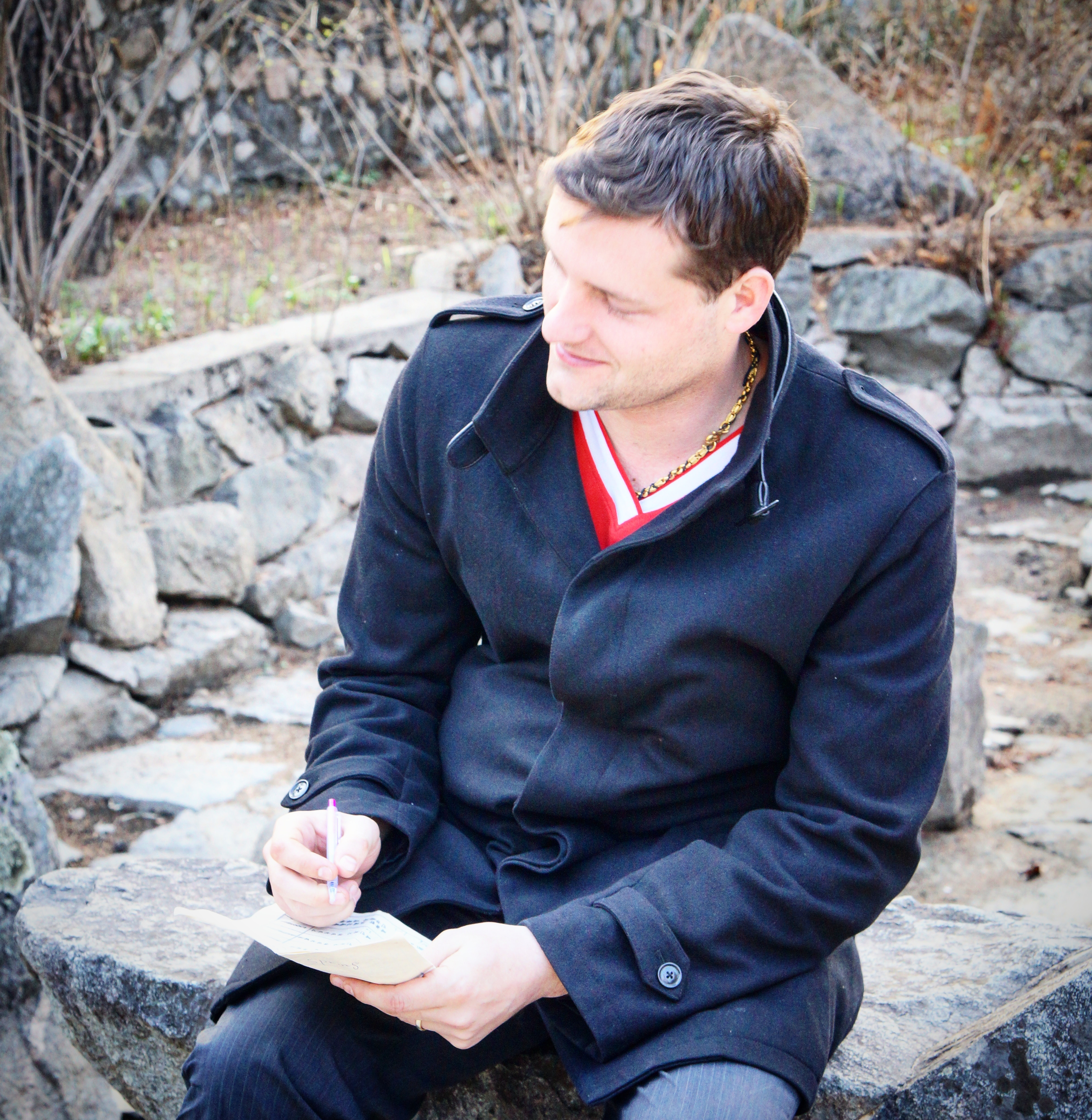
- Collings in 2013
- Born: 1986
- Died: February 2020 (aged 33)
- Education: University of Auckland
- Occupations: Businessman; tour guide
- Years active: 2008–2020
- Known for: Co-founding Young Pioneer Tours

Troy Michael Collings (1986 – February 2020) was a New Zealand businessman and tour guide. In 2008, he co-founded Young Pioneer Tours, a company known for specialising in low-cost tours of North Korea and other remote places. In early 2020, Collings died of a heart attack at the age of 33.

== Personal life and career ==
Collings was from Auckland, New Zealand. He graduated from the University of Auckland business school in 2008.

Collings became interested in North Korea after watching the 2004 documentary A State of Mind about North Korean gymnasts training for the 2003 Pyongyang Arirang Mass Games. He later went on a research tour to the country.

Collings was an advocate for North Korean tourism. He is quoted as saying that North Korea is open to everyone except South Koreans and journalists. He helped open the Tumen-Namyang border between China and North Korea to foreign tourists. He was the first westerner to travel across the Tumen-Namyang border, when he led a tour group across the border in 2013. In 2012, he launched the Pyongyang Deaf and Blind Centre funding.

In 2015, Collings confirmed the reopening of the North Korean border after an ebola scare. In the same year, he spoke about North Korean citizens having an ever-increasing choice of food at the Kwangbok Department Store in Pyongyang. In 2017, he was quoted as saying that hemp was as cheap as tobacco in North Korea.

On 5 March 2020, it was announced that he had died of a heart attack at the age of 33.

== Young Pioneer Tours ==
In 2008, Collings and Gareth Johnson founded Young Pioneer Tours while living as expatriates in China. The company is registered in China, and Collings worked as a managing director. One of their aims was to make travelling to North Korea affordable; their tours cost around half the price of existing tours to the country. At the time, a trip to North Korea cost about €2000, but Collings offered trips from €795. Collings believed that engaging people with North Korea could lead to "less mutual distrust in the future."

As well as tours to North Korea, the company includes tours of Chernobyl in Ukraine, East Timor, Abkhazia, and Nauru in Micronesia. The organisation also offers short-term study trips to Pyongyang University of Foreign Studies, a Chinese-funded language centre.

In 2017, Young Pioneer Tours were criticised after the death of Otto Warmbier, a U.S. citizen who was on a tour with the company. Warmbier was sentenced to 15 years on a charge of subversion and died in 2017. After Warmbier's death, Collings maintained that North Korea was a "safe place to visit", as Warmbier was the first person on a Young Pioneer Tour to be arrested. He maintained that North Korea was safe as long as local laws were adhered to, and also refuted claims that Young Pioneer Tours targeted Americans, saying that none of their advertising had focused on Americans.
