= Hong Jin-gi =

South Korean footballer

Hong Jin-Gi
Personal information
- Full name: Hong Jin-Gi
- Date of birth: 20 October 1990 (age 36)
- Place of birth: South Korea
- Height: 1.82 m (5 ft 11 1/2 in)
- Position: Centre back

Team information
- Current team: Busan IPark
- Number: 4

Youth career
- 2009–2011: Hongik University

Senior career*
Years	Team	Apps	(Gls)
2012–2016	Jeonnam Dragons	77	(3)
2017–	Busan IPark	16	(2)
- * Club domestic league appearances and goals as of 18 November 2018

Hong Jin-Gi (Korean: 홍진기; born 20 October 1990) is a South Korean footballer who plays as a centre back for Busan IPark.

== Club career statistics ==
As of 18 November 2018

Club performance			League		Cup		League Cup		Other		Total	
Season	Club	League	Apps	Goals	Apps	Goals	Apps	Goals	Apps	Goals	Apps	Goals
South Korea			League		KFA Cup		League Cup		Play-offs		Total	
2012	Jeonnam Dragons	K League 1	20	1	0	0	-		-		20	1
2013	Jeonnam Dragons	K League 1	30	2	0	0	-		-		30	2
2014	Jeonnam Dragons	K League 1	12	0	0	0	-		-		12	0
2015	Jeonnam Dragons	K League 1	6	0	1	0	-		-		7	0
2016	Jeonnam Dragons	K League 1	9	0	0	0	-		-		9	0
2017	Busan IPark	K League 2	6	2	2	0	-		2	0	10	2
2018	Busan IPark	K League 2	10	0	2	0	-		0	0	12	0
Career total			93	5	5	0	0	0	2	0	100	5
