= Kim Shin-young (footballer) =

South Korean footballer (born 1983)

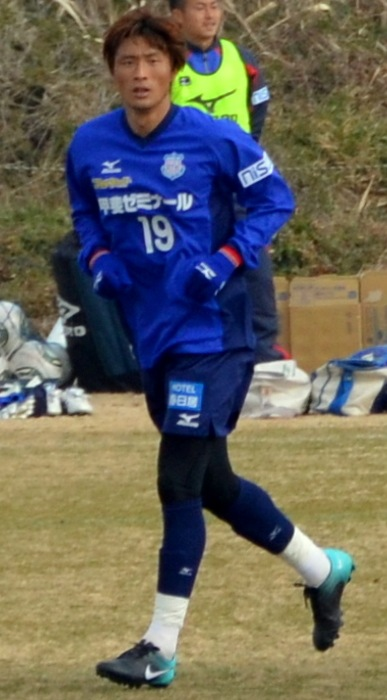

Personal information
- Date of birth: 16 June 1983 (age 43)
- Place of birth: South Korea
- Height: 1.86 m (6 ft 1 in)
- Position: Striker

Team information
- Current team: Cheonan City
- Number: 33

Youth career
- Iri High School
- 2003–2006: Hanyang University

Senior career*
Years	Team	Apps	(Gls)
2007	Cerezo Osaka	8	(1)
2007–2009	Sagan Tosu	48	(8)
2009–2011	Ventforet Kofu	67	(15)
2011–2012	Ehime FC	10	(0)
2012	Chunnam Dragons	11	(1)
2012–2013	Jeonbuk Hyundai Motors	44	(2)
2013–2014	Busan IPark	8	(0)
2015	AC Nagano Parceiro		
2016–	Cheonan City		
- * Club domestic league appearances and goals as of 8 December 2014

- Kim Shin-young
- Hangul: 김신영
- Hanja: 金信泳
- RR: Gim Sinyeong
- MR: Kim Sinyŏng

Kim Shin-young (Korean: 김신영; born 16 June 1983), is a South Korean football goalkeeper.

He debuted at Cerezo Osaka and also played for Sagan Tosu, Ventforet Kofu and Ehime FC mostly in the J2 League. He later plays Busan IPark, Jeonbuk Hyundai Motors, Chunnam Dragons in K League Classic, the top Korean league.

== Club statistics ==
Club performance			League		Cup		League Cup		Total	
Season	Club	League	Apps	Goals	Apps	Goals	Apps	Goals	Apps	Goals
Japan			League		Emperor's Cup		J.League Cup		Total	
2007	Cerezo Osaka	J2 League	8	1	0	0	-		8	1
2007	Sagan Tosu	J2 League	20	6	2	2	-		22	8
2008	Sagan Tosu	J2 League	28	2	1	0	-		29	2
2009	Ventforet Kofu	J2 League	45	14	2	2	-		47	16
2010	Ventforet Kofu	J2 League	20	1	1	0	-		21	1
2011	Ventforet Kofu	J1 League	3	0					3	0
2011	Ehime FC	J2 League	10	0	1	0	-		11	0
Country	Japan		134	24	7	4	0	0	141	28
Total			134	24	7	4	0	0	141	28
