= Lúcio Flávio (footballer, born 1986) =

Brazilian footballer

Personal information
- Full name: Lúcio Flávio da Silva Oliva
- Date of birth: 29 August 1986 (age 40)
- Place of birth: Sorocaba, Brazil
- Height: 1.81 m (5 ft 11 in)
- Position: Forward

Senior career*
Years	Team	Apps	(Gls)
2007	Rio Branco-PR		
2007	Iraty		
2008	Veranópolis		
2008	Marcílio Dias		
2009	Ituiutaba		
2009–2010	Brasiliense	7	(1)
2010	→ Ituiutaba (loan)	7	(3)
2010	→ Guaratinguetá (loan)	24	(8)
2011–2012	Guaratinguetá	4	(0)
2011–2012	→ Ponte Preta (loan)	17	(7)
2012	Chunnam Dragons	15	(6)
2013	→ Daejeon Citizen (loan)	7	(1)
2014	ABC	17	(2)
2015	São Bernardo	0	(0)
2015	Operário Ferroviário	3	(2)
2015–2016	Paraná	37	(9)
2017	Fortaleza	17	(5)
2018	São Bento	0	(4)
2018	Paysandu	11	(0)
2019	Ferroviária	0	(0)
2019	Criciúma	9	(0)
2020	Portuguesa	9	(3)
2020–2021	Boa	6	(2)
2021	Al-Shoulla	23	(6)
- * Club domestic league appearances and goals as of 13:18, 20 June 2019 (UTC)

Lúcio Flávio da Silva Oliva (born 29 August 1986), known as Lúcio Flávio, is a Brazilian footballer who plays as a forward.

== Contract ==
- Brasiliense.
