= Shim Dong-woon =

South Korean footballer (born 1990)

Personal information
- Date of birth: 3 March 1990 (age 36)
- Place of birth: South Korea
- Height: 1.69 m (5 ft 6 1/2 in)
- Position: Winger

Team information
- Current team: Gimcheon Sangmu
- Number: 7

Youth career
- Hongik University

Senior career*
Years	Team	Apps	(Gls)
2012–2014	Jeonnam Dragons	79	(11)
2015–2020	Pohang Steelers	131	(20)
2018–2019	→ Sangju Sangmu (army)	48	(10)
2021–2023	FC Anyang	33	(2)
2022	→ Seongnam FC (loan)	15	(1)
2023–	Seongnam FC	12	(1)
2024–	Gimcheon Sangmu (Army)	0	(0)
Total		318	(45)

International career
2012	South Korea U23	1	(0)
- * Club domestic league appearances and goals

- Shim Dong-woon
- Hangul: 심동운
- RR: Sim Dongun
- MR: Sim Tongun

Shim Dong-woon (Korean: 심동운; born 3 March 1990) is a South Korean former professional footballer who played as a winger for Gimcheon Sangmu.

== Career ==
He joined Jeonnam Dragons in 2012. He made his first appearance at opening match of K-League 2012 against Gangwon FC.
