= Son Seol-min =

South Korean footballer

Son Seol-Min
Personal information
- Full name: Son Seol-Min
- Date of birth: 26 April 1990 (age 36)
- Place of birth: South Korea
- Height: 1.78 m (5 ft 10 in)
- Position: Midfielder

Team information
- Current team: Gangwon FC
- Number: 14

Youth career
- Kwandong University

Senior career*
Years	Team	Apps	(Gls)
2012–2013	Jeonnam Dragons	15	(2)
2013	→ Gyeongju KH&NP (loan)	4	(2)
2014	Gyeongju KH&NP	8	(0)
2015–	Gangwon FC	8	(0)
2015	→ Daejeon Citizen (loan)	9	(0)
- * Club domestic league appearances and goals as of 3 November 2016

Son Seol-Min (Korean: 손설민; born 26 April 1990) is a South Korean footballer who plays as a midfielder for Gangwon FC in the K League Challenge.
