= Kim Sang-duk =

Korean-American professor

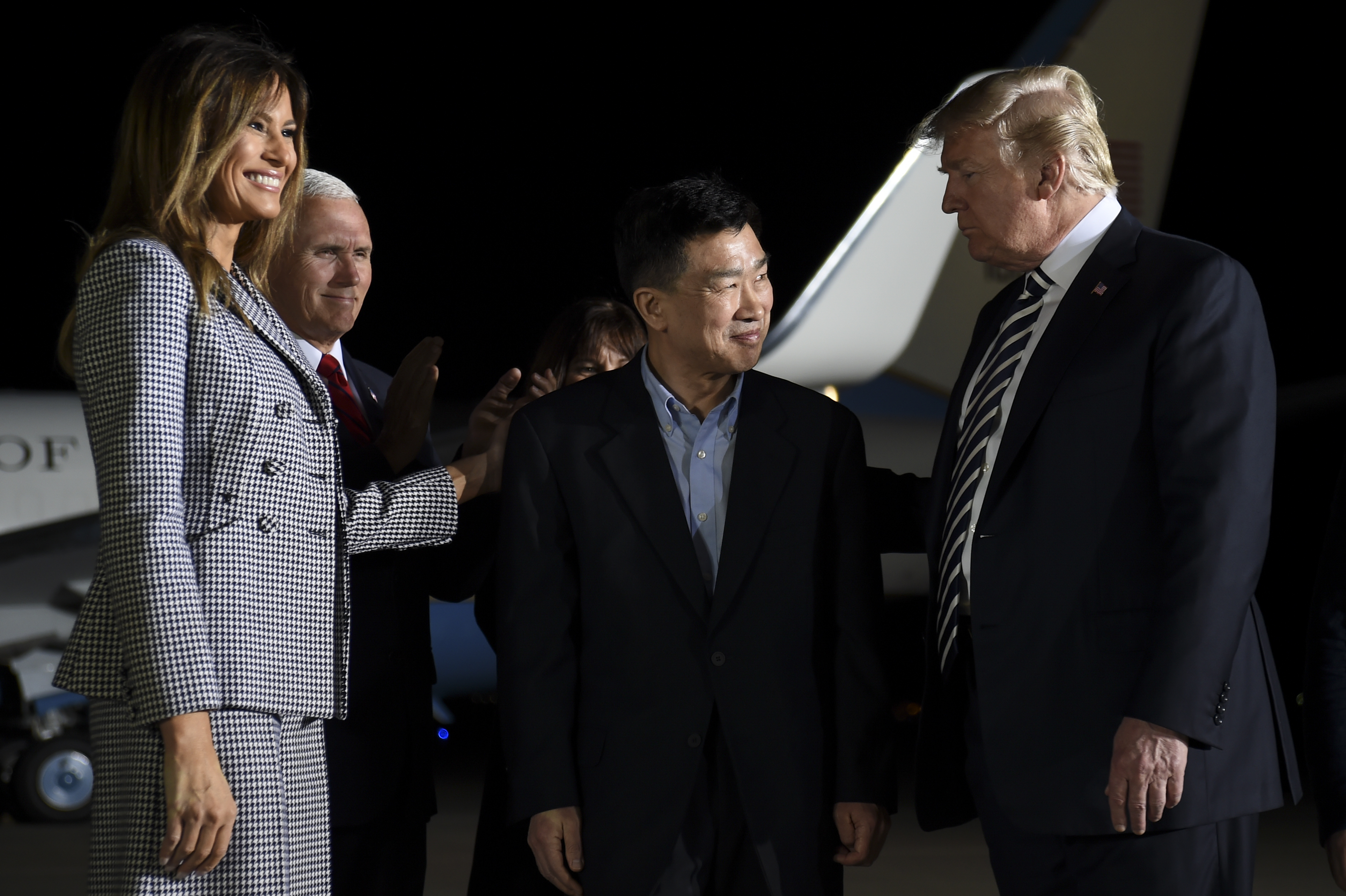
- Kim (center) with President Donald Trump after his release in 2018
- Born: 1959 (age 66–67)
- Other name: Tony Kim
- Occupation: Professor
- Employer: Business Administration School of Yanbian University of Science and Technology

Detainment
- Country: North Korea
- Detained: April 22, 2017
- Released: May 9, 2018
- Days in detention: 382
- Reason for detention: Committing hostile acts against the state

Kim Sang-duk (Korean: 김상덕; born c. 1959), also known as Tony Kim, is a Korean-American professor who was detained in North Korea for 382 days. On May 9, 2018, it was reported that Kim was released from custody.

== Life and detention ==
Before being detained, Kim taught accounting at the Business Administration School of Yanbian University of Science and Technology (YUST) in the northeastern Chinese city of Yanji, near the China–North Korea border. According to Voice of America Korea reports, he was a regional director in charge of transporting foreign aid materials to several areas affected by the 2016 floods in North Korea, and his humanitarian work has gone on for more than 10 years.

On April 22, 2017, Kim and his wife were detained, and Kim was subsequently arrested at Sunan International Airport in Pyongyang as he was waiting to board a flight. In May 2017, Kim was allegedly accused of "committing criminal acts of hostility aimed to overturn [North Korea]." Kim was one of three Americans who were released from detention in North Korea in May 2018 in advance of a U.S.-North Korea summit. The others are Kim Dong-chul and Kim Hak-song.

At the time of his arrest, Kim had completed a one-month assignment as a guest lecturer in international finance and management at the Pyongyang University of Science and Technology (PUST), a YUST sister institution, according to the chancellor of PUST, Park Chan-mo. North Korean authorities did not immediately announce the reason for Kim's arrest. He had not been returned to the United States when the Olympic Games occurred in Pyeongchang, South Korea during 2018, although a spokesperson for the United States State Department informed the news media: "We are working to see U.S. citizens who are detained in North Korea come home as soon as possible."

=== Release ===
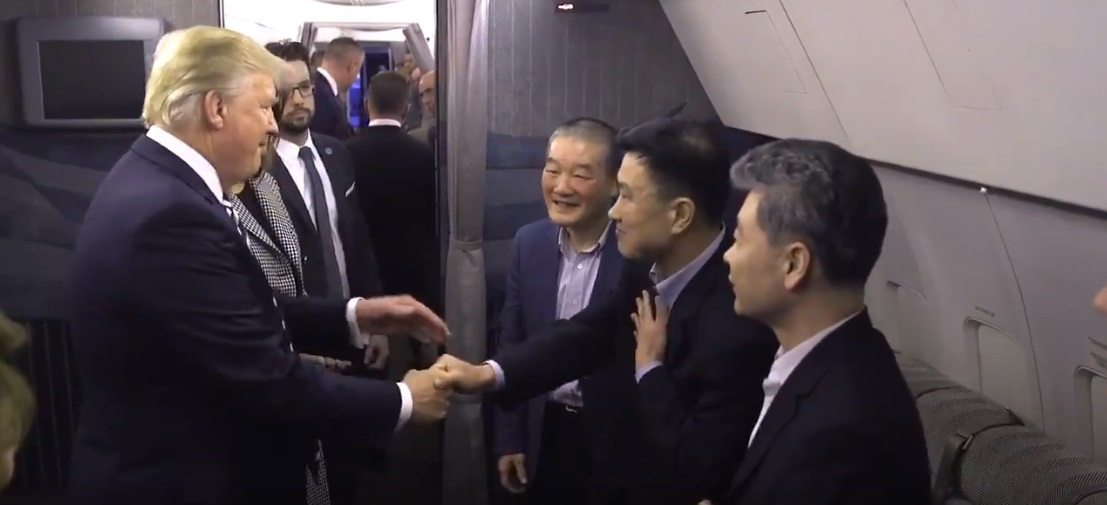
President Donald Trump and First Lady Melania Trump welcome home (from left) Kim Dong-chul, Kim Sang-duk and Kim Hak-song.

On May 9, 2018, several news outlets reported that Kim and fellow American detainees Kim Dong-chul and Kim Hak-song had been granted amnesty following a meeting between Supreme Leader Kim Jong Un and United States Secretary of State Mike Pompeo in Pyongyang to discuss details of the planned summit between Kim and President Donald Trump. Kim Sang-duk's 'family expressed gratitude and credited Trump for engaging directly with North Korea' upon learning of his release. The three men, alongside Pompeo, landed at Andrews Air Force Base shortly before 3 am eastern on May 10, thereby concluding a 17-month struggle by the United States to secure their release.

== See also ==
- List of foreign nationals detained in North Korea
