= Jung Yoon-sung =

South Korean footballer (born 1984)

Personal information
- Date of birth: June 1, 1984 (age 42)
- Place of birth: South Korea
- Height: 1.84 m (6 ft 0 in)
- Position: Forward

Youth career
- 2000–2002: Suwon Technical High School

Senior career*
Years	Team	Apps	(Gls)
2003–2007	Suwon Bluewings	12	(1)
2005–2006	→ Gwangju Sangmu (army)	31	(4)
2007–2008	Gyeongnam FC	24	(7)
2009–2011	Chunnam Dragons	35	(5)
Total		102	(17)
- * Club domestic league appearances and goals as of 14 July 2011

- Jung Yoon-sung
- Hangul: 정윤성
- Hanja: 鄭允成
- RR: Jeong Yunseong
- MR: Chŏng Yunsŏng

Jung Yoon-sung (born June 1, 1984) is a South Korean football forward.

== Career ==
He formerly played for Suwon Samsung Bluewings, Gwangju Sangmu, Gyeongnam FC and Chunnam Dragons. Jung was accused of involvement in the league match-fixing scandal on 24 June 2011.
