= Jung Myung-oh =

South Korean footballer

Personal information
- Date of birth: 29 October 1986 (age 40)
- Place of birth: South Korea
- Height: 1.84 m (6 ft 1/2 in)
- Positions: Defensive midfielder; centre-back

Youth career
- 2005–2008: Ajou University

Senior career*
Years	Team	Apps	(Gls)
2009–2010	Gyeongnam FC	6	(0)
2011	Suwon City	21	(1)
2012	Chunnam Dragons	22	(0)
2013	Army United	28	(4)
2014–2016	Suphanburi	34	(1)
2017–2021	Sukhothai	66	(5)
2021	Mokpo	4	(1)
2024	Ayutthaya United	18	(0)
- * Club domestic league appearances and goals as of 3 April 2024

- Jung Myung-oh
- Hangul: 정명오
- RR: Jeong Myeongo
- MR: Chŏng Myŏngo

Jung Myung-oh (Korean: 정명오; born 29 October 1986) is a South Korean professional footballer who plays as a defensive midfielder or centre-back.
