= Jung Keun-hee =

South Korean footballer

Jung Keun-Hee
Personal information
- Full name: Jung Keun-Hee
- Date of birth: 8 December 1988 (age 37)
- Place of birth: South Korea
- Height: 1.86 m (6 ft 1 in)
- Position: Defender

Team information
- Current team: Chunnam Dragons
- Number: 30

Youth career
- Konkuk University

Senior career*
Years	Team	Apps	(Gls)
2011–	Chunnam Dragons	7	(0)
- * Club domestic league appearances and goals as of 14 December 2013

Jung Keun-Hee (Korean: 정근희; born 8 December 1988) is a South Korean footballer who plays as a defender for the Chunnam Dragons in the K-League. He joined the Dragons in 2011.
