= Ryu Won-woo =

South Korean footballer (born 1990)

Personal information
- Full name: Ryu Won-woo
- Date of birth: 5 August 1990 (age 36)
- Place of birth: Gwangju, South Korea
- Height: 1.85 m (6 ft 1 in)
- Position: Goalkeeper

Team information
- Current team: Paju Frontier
- Number: 1

Youth career
- Jeonnam Dragons

Senior career*
Years	Team	Apps	(Gls)
2009–2014	Jeonnam Dragons	10	(0)
2014	→ Gwangju FC (loan)	8	(0)
2015–2017	Bucheon FC	101	(0)
2018–2022	Pohang Steelers	16	(0)
2020	→ Paju Citizen (loan)	2	(0)
2021	→ Siheung Citizen (loan)	13	(0)
2023–2024	Chungbuk Cheongju	19	(0)
2024	→ Jeonnam Dragons (loan)	18	(0)
2025	Gyeongnam FC	18	(0)
2026–	Paju Frontier FC	6	(0)
- * Club domestic league appearances and goals as of 6 August 2026

Ryu Won-woo (Korean: 류원우; born 5 August 1990) is a South Korean footballer who plays as a goalkeeper for Paju Frontier.

== Club career ==
On 31 December 2025, Ryu Won-woo announcement official transfer to K League 2 promoted club, Paju Frontier from 2026 season, Ryu return to Paju since 2020 season on loan.
