= Jeong Jun-yeon =

South Korean footballer (born 1989)

Personal information
- Full name: Jeong Jun-yeon
- Date of birth: 30 April 1989 (age 37)
- Place of birth: Jeonnam, South Korea
- Height: 1.78 m (5 ft 10 in)
- Position: Defender

Team information
- Current team: FC Anyang
- Number: 2

Youth career
- Chunnam Dragons youth

Senior career*
Years	Team	Apps	(Gls)
2008–2014	Jeonnam Dragons	76	(1)
2014	→ Gwangju FC (loan)	30	(0)
2015–2020	Gwangju FC	92	(0)
2016–2017	→ Sangju Sangmu (army)	14	(0)
2021-	FC Anyang	48	(2)

International career
2007–2009	South Korea U20	12	(0)
- * Club domestic league appearances and goals as of 3 August 2026

- Jeong Jun-yeon
- Hangul: 정준연
- Hanja: 鄭俊硯
- RR: Jeong Junyeon
- MR: Chŏng Chunyŏn

Jeong Jun-yeon (Korean: 정준연; born 30 April 1989) is a South Korean footballer who plays as a defender for FC Anyang.

== Club career statistics ==
Club performance			League		Cup		League Cup		Continental		Total	
Season	Club	League	Apps	Goals	Apps	Goals	Apps	Goals	Apps	Goals	Apps	Goals
2008	Chunnam Dragons	K League 1	3	0	0	0	0	0	2	0	5	0
2009	Chunnam Dragons	K League 1	6	0			0	0	—		6	0
2010	Chunnam Dragons	K League 1	19	0			3	0	—		22	0
2011	Chunnam Dragons	K League 1	14	0	2	0	3	0	—		19	0
Career total			42	0	2	0	6	0	2	0	52	0
