= Lee Jun-ki =

South Korean footballer (born 1982)

Lee Jun-Ki
Personal information
- Date of birth: April 25, 1982 (age 44)
- Place of birth: South Korea
- Height: 1.84 m (6 ft 0 in)
- Position: Defender

Team information
- Current team: Phuket City

Senior career*
| Years | Team | Apps | (Gls) |
| 2002–2006 | FC Seoul | 2 | (0) |
| 2004–2005 | → Police (military service) | | |
| 2006–2011 | Chunnam Dragons | 63 | (0) |
| 2012–2015 | TOT | 66 | (5) |
| 2016–2017 | PTT Rayong | 0 | (0) |
| 2017 | Samut Sakhon | 8 | (0) |
| 2018 | Phuket City | | |

Managerial career
- 2016: PTT Rayong (Interim)
- * Club domestic league appearances and goals as of June 7, 2014

Lee Jun-Ki (Korean: 이준기; born April 25, 1982) is a South Korean former professional footballer.

== Honours ==
=== Club ===
Jeonnam Dragons

- Korean FA Cup winners (2) : 2006, 2007
