= Park Sun-yong =

South Korean footballer (born 1989)

Personal information
- Date of birth: 12 March 1989 (age 37)
- Place of birth: South Korea
- Height: 1.73 m (5 ft 8 in)
- Position: Midfielder

Team information
- Current team: Pohang Steelers
- Number: 32

Senior career*
Years	Team	Apps	(Gls)
2012–2014	Jeonnam Dragons	76	(2)
2015–	Pohang Steelers	53	(0)
2017–2018	→ Asan Mugunghwa (army)	7	(0)
- * Club domestic league appearances and goals as of 5 December 2019

- Park Sun-yong
- Hangul: 박선용
- RR: Bak Seonyong
- MR: Pak Sŏnyong

Park Sun-yong (Korean: 박선용; born 12 March 1989) is a South Korean footballer who plays as a midfielder for Pohang Steelers in the K League 1. His younger brother Park Sun-ju is also a footballer.
