= Shin Jung-hwan (footballer) =

South Korean footballer (born 1986)

Shin Jung-Hwan
Personal information
- Full name: Shin Jung-Hwan
- Date of birth: 18 August 1986 (age 40)
- Place of birth: South Korea
- Height: 1.83 m (6 ft 0 in)
- Position: Goalkeeper

Team information
- Current team: Yongin City
- Number: 1

Youth career
- Kwandong University

Senior career*
Years	Team	Apps	(Gls)
2008–2010	Jeju United	0	(0)
2009–2010	→ Police (army)		
2011	Chunnam Dragons	0	(0)
2012	Ulsan Hyundai Mipo	2	(0)
2013–	Yongin City	9	(0)
- * Club domestic league appearances and goals as of 7 July 2013

Shin Jung-Hwan (Korean: 신정환, born 18 August 1986) is a South Korean football player who plays for Yongin City in the Second Division, Korea National League.

Shin was previously on the books for Jeju United FC and Chunnam Dragons in the K-League.
