= Kang Jin-kyu =

South Korean footballer (born 1983)

Personal information
- Date of birth: 10 September 1983 (age 43)
- Place of birth: South Korea
- Height: 1.75 m (5 ft 9 in)
- Position: Midfielder

Youth career
- 2002–2005: Chung-Ang University

Senior career*
Years	Team	Apps	(Gls)
2006–2011	Chunnam Dragons	3	(0)
2008–2009	→ Gwangju Sangmu (Army)	24	(2)
2012–	Busan Transportation Corporation	0	(0)
- * Club domestic league appearances and goals as of 22 October 2009

- Kang Jin-kyu
- Hangul: 강진규
- RR: Gang Jingyu
- MR: Kang Chin'gyu

Kang Jin-kyu (Korean: 강진규; born 10 September 1983) is a South Korean football midfielder, who plays for Busan Transportation Corporation FC in Korea National League. His previous club was Chunnam Dragons and Gwangju Sangmu in K-League.

== Career statistics ==
As of 22 October 2009

Club performance			League		Cup		League Cup		Continental		Total	
Season	Club	League	Apps	Goals	Apps	Goals	Apps	Goals	Apps	Goals	Apps	Goals
South Korea			League		KFA Cup		League Cup		Asia		Total	
2006	Chunnam Dragons	K-League	0	0	0	0	0	0	-		0	0
2007	Chunnam Dragons	K-League	0	0	0	0	0	0	-		0	0
2008	Gwangju Sangmu	K-League	6	0	0	0	2	0	-		8	0
2009	Gwangju Sangmu	K-League	18	2	1	0	4	1	-		23	3
Total	Chunnam Dragons		0	0	0	0	0	0	-		0	0
Total	Gwangju Sangmu		24	2	1	0	6	1	-		31	3
Career total			24	2	1	0	6	1	-		31	3
