= Lee Wan (footballer) =

South Korean footballer

Personal information
- Date of birth: 3 May 1984 (age 42)
- Place of birth: South Korea
- Height: 1.81 m (5 ft 11 in)
- Position: Defender

Youth career
- 2002–2005: Yonsei University

Senior career*
Years	Team	Apps	(Gls)
2006–2012	Chunnam Dragons	52	(1)
2008–2009	→ Gwangju Sangmu (military service)	30	(2)
2013	Ulsan Hyundai	4	(0)
2014	Gwangju FC	17	(3)
2015–2016	Gangwon FC	4	(0)
Total		107	(6)

International career^{‡}
2002–2003	South Korea U-20	4	(1)
- * Club domestic league appearances and goals as of 2 November 2016 ‡ National team caps and goals as of 6 October 2008

Lee Wan (Korean: 이완; born 3 May 1984) is a South Korean former football defender, who played for Chunnam Dragons, Gwangju Sangmu FC, Ulsan Hyundai FC, Gwangju FC and Gangwon FC.

== Club career statistics ==
As of end of 2016

Club performance			League		Cup		League Cup		Continental		Other		Total	
Season	Club	League	Apps	Goals	Apps	Goals	Apps	Goals	Apps	Goals	Apps	Goals	Apps	Goals
South Korea			League		KFA Cup		League Cup		Asia		Other		Total	
2006	Chunnam Dragons	K-League / K League Classic	3	0	0	0	1	0	-		-		4	0
2007	Chunnam Dragons	K-League / K League Classic	6	0	2	0	0	0	3	0	-		11	0
2008	Gwangju Sangmu	K-League / K League Classic	5	1	1	0	0	0	-		-		6	1
2009	Gwangju Sangmu	K-League / K League Classic	25	1	0	0	4	0	-		-		29	1
2009	Chunnam Dragons	K-League / K League Classic	2	0	-		-		-		2	0	4	0
2010	Chunnam Dragons	K-League / K League Classic	17	0	1	0	1	0	-		-		19	0
2011	Chunnam Dragons	K-League / K League Classic	16	1	2	0	2	0	-		-		20	1
2012	Chunnam Dragons	K-League / K League Classic	8	0	0	0	-		-		-		8	0
2013	Ulsan Hyundai	K-League / K League Classic	4	0	0	0	-		-		-		4	0
2014	Gwangju FC	K League Challenge	17	3	1	0	-		-		4	0	22	3
2015	Gangwon FC	K League Challenge	4	0	0	0	-		-		-		4	0
2016	Gangwon FC	K League Challenge	0	0	0	0	-		-		0	0	0	0
Total	Chunnam Dragons		52	1	5	0	4	0	3	0	2	0	66	1
Total	Gwangju Sangmu		30	2	1	0	4	0	-		-		35	2
Total	Ulsan Hyundai		4	0	0	0	-		-		-		4	0
Total	Gwangju FC		17	3	1	0	-		-		4	0	22	3
Total	Gangwon FC		4	0	0	0	-		-		0	0	4	0
Career total			107	6	7	0	8	0	3	0	6	0	131	6
