= Kim Young-uk =

South Korean footballer

Personal information
- Date of birth: April 29, 1991 (age 35)
- Place of birth: South Korea
- Height: 1.77 m (5 ft 9 1/2 in)
- Position: Midfielder

Team information
- Current team: Seoul E-Land FC
- Number: 14

Youth career
- Jeonnam Dragons

Senior career*
| Years | Team | Apps | (Gls) |
| 2010–2019 | Jeonnam Dragons | 236 | (21) |
| 2020–2021 | Jeju United | 48 | (1) |
| 2022–2023 | Daejeon Hana Citizen | 35 | (0) |
| 2024– | Seoul E-Land FC | 19 | (0) |

International career
| 2009–2011 | South Korea U-20 | 27 | (1) |
| 2011–2014 | South Korea U-23 | 11 | (0) |
Medal record
Representing South Korea
Men's football
Asian Games
| Gold medal – first place | 2014 Incheon | Team |
- * Club domestic league appearances and goals as of 6 January 2026

- Kim Young-uk
- Hangul: 김영욱
- Hanja: 金泳旭
- RR: Gim Yeonguk
- MR: Kim Yŏnguk

Kim Young-uk (Korean: 김영욱; born April 29, 1991) is a South Korean football player who plays for Seoul E-Land FC.

== Career ==
In 2022, Young-uk joined Daejeon Hana Citizen.

On 2 January 2024, Young-uk joined Seoul E-Land FC.
