= Kim Myung-joong =

South Korea footballer (born 1985)

Kim Myung-Joong
Personal information
- Date of birth: 6 February 1985 (age 41)
- Place of birth: South Korea
- Height: 1.82 m (6 ft 0 in)
- Positions: Winger; forward

Youth career
- 2002–2004: Moonil High School

Senior career*
Years	Team	Apps	(Gls)
2005–2009	Pohang Steelers	20	(1)
2008–2009	→ Gwangju Sangmu (military service)	49	(15)
2010–2011	Chunnam Dragons	46	(6)
2012	Gangwon FC	22	(2)
- * Club domestic league appearances and goals as of 20 December 2012

- Kim Myung-joong
- Hangul: 김명중
- Hanja: 金明中
- RR: Gim Myeongjung
- MR: Kim Myŏngjung

Kim Myung-Joong (Korean: 김명중; born 6 February 1985) is a former South Korean football winger, who plays for Gangwon FC in K-League lastly.

== Career statistics ==
As of end of 2012 season

Club performance			League		Cup		League Cup		Continental		Total	
Season	Club	League	Apps	Goals	Apps	Goals	Apps	Goals	Apps	Goals	Apps	Goals
South Korea			League		KFA Cup		League Cup		Asia		Total	
2005	Pohang Steelers	K-League	8	0	3	0	0	0	-		11	0
2006	Pohang Steelers	K-League	6	0	1	0	7	0	-		14	0
2007	Pohang Steelers	K-League	4	0	0	0	7	0	-		11	0
2008	Gwangju Sangmu	K-League	24	7	3	0	7	0	-		34	7
2009	Gwangju Sangmu	K-League	25	8	0	0	1	0	-		26	8
2009	Pohang Steelers	K-League	2	1	0	0	0	0	2	0	4	1
2010	Chunnam Dragons	K-League	22	1	4	1	4	2	-		29	4
2011	Chunnam Dragons	K-League	24	5	1	0	3	0	-		28	5
2012	Gangwon FC	K-League	22	2	1	0	-		-		23	2
Career total			137	24	13	1	29	2	2	0	181	27
