= Gong Tae-ha =

South Korean footballer

Personal information
- Full name: Gong Tae-ha
- Date of birth: 9 May 1987 (age 39)
- Place of birth: South Korea
- Height: 1.83 m (6 ft 0 in)
- Position: Forward

Team information
- Current team: Daejeon Citizen
- Number: 81

Youth career
- Gwangyang Jecheol High School
- Yonsei University

Senior career*
Years	Team	Apps	(Gls)
2010–2013	Jeonnam Dragons	29	(3)
2014–2015	TOT	31	(3)
2015–	Daejeon Citizen	10	(0)
- * Club domestic league appearances and goals as of 15 December 2015 ‡ National team caps and goals as of June 07, 2014

- Gong Tae-ha
- Hangul: 공태하
- RR: Gong Taeha
- MR: Kong T'aeha

Gong Tae-ha (Korean: 공태하; born 9 May 1987) is a South Korean footballer who plays for team, Daejeon Citizen.
