= Yoo Ji-no =

South Korean football player (born 1989)

Yoo Ji-No
Personal information
- Full name: Yoo Ji-No
- Date of birth: November 6, 1989 (age 36)
- Place of birth: Seoul, South Korea
- Height: 1.80 m (5 ft 11 in)
- Position: Full back

Team information
- Current team: Suwon FC
- Number: 2

Senior career*
| Years | Team | Apps | (Gls) |
| 2008–2012 | Chunnam Dragons | 61 | (0) |
| 2013 | Seongnam Ilhwa Chunma | 0 | (0) |
| 2013–2015 | Busan IPark | 51 | (1) |
| 2016– | Suwon FC | 4 | (0) |

International career^{‡}
| 2007–2008 | South Korea U-20 | 6 | (1) |
| 2011 | South Korea U-23 | 1 | (0) |
- * Club domestic league appearances and goals as of 12 December 2016 ‡ National team caps and goals as of 23 June 2011

Yoo Ji-No (born November 6, 1989) is a South Korean football player who plays for Suwon FC.

== Career ==
Yoo joined Busan IPark from Jeonnam Dragons in 2013. A versatile defender or midfielder, Yoo became a regular at right wing-back for Busan during the 2014 season. His first professional goal was a late header against Gwangju FC on 24 April 2015, securing a 1–0 victory. Yoo joined Suwon City following Busan IPark's relegation from the K League Classic.

== Club career statistics ==
Correct as of 6 December 2015

| Club performance | | | League | | Cup | | League Cup | | Continental | | Total | |
| Season | Club | League | Apps | Goals | Apps | Goals | Apps | Goals | Apps | Goals | Apps | Goals |
| South Korea | | | League | | KFA Cup | | League Cup | | Asia | | Total | |
|---|---|---|---|---|---|---|---|---|---|---|---|---|
| 2008 | Chunnam Dragons | K-League | 8 | 0 | 1 | 0 | 3 | 0 | 0 | 0 | 12 | 0 |
| 2009 | Chunnam Dragons | K-League | 13 | 0 | 3 | 0 | 3 | 0 | - | | 19 | 0 |
| 2010 | Chunnam Dragons | K-League | 12 | 0 | 1 | 0 | 1 | 0 | - | | 14 | 0 |
| 2011 | Chunnam Dragons | K-League | 16 | 0 | 3 | 0 | 4 | 0 | - | | 23 | 0 |
| 2012 | Chunnam Dragons | K-League | 12 | 0 | 0 | 0 | - | | - | | 12 | 0 |
| 2013 | Busan IPark | KL Classic | 6 | 0 | 1 | 0 | - | - | - | - | 7 | 0 |
| 2014 | Busan IPark | KL Classic | 19 | 0 | 1 | 0 | - | - | - | - | 20 | 0 |
| 2015 | Busan IPark | KL Classic | 26 | 1 | 1 | 0 | - | - | - | - | 27 | 1 |
| Total | South Korea | | 112 | 1 | 11 | 0 | 11 | 0 | 0 | 0 | 134 | 1 |
| Career total | | | 112 | 1 | 11 | 0 | 11 | 0 | 0 | 0 | 134 | 1 |
