= Shin Young-jun =

South Korean footballer (born 1989)

Shin Young-Jun
Personal information
- Date of birth: 6 September 1989 (age 37)
- Place of birth: South Korea
- Height: 1.79 m (5 ft 10 1/2 in)
- Position: Forward

Team information
- Current team: Busan IPark
- Number: 13

Youth career
- 2006–2008: Gwangyang Jecheol High School
- 2009: Honam University

Senior career*
| Years | Team | Apps | (Gls) |
| 2010 | Yongin City FC | 20 | (3) |
| 2011–2013 | Chunnam Dragons | 42 | (6) |
| 2013–2014 | Pohang Steelers | 28 | (2) |
| 2015–2017 | Gangwon FC | 20 | (3) |
| 2016–2017 | → Sangju Sangmu (army) | 22 | (2) |
| 2018– | Busan IPark | 11 | (2) |
- * Club domestic league appearances and goals as of 9 December 2018

Shin Young-Jun (Korean: 신영준; born 6 September 1989) is a South Korean footballer who plays as a forward for Busan IPark.
