= Kim Dong-chul (footballer) =

South Korean footballer

Personal information
- Full name: Kim Dong-chul
- Date of birth: 1 October 1990 (age 36)
- Place of birth: South Korea
- Height: 1.80 m (5 ft 11 in)
- Position: Defender

Team information
- Current team: Seoul E-Land
- Number: 55

Senior career*
| Years | Team | Apps | (Gls) |
| 2012–2015 | Jeonnam Dragons | 70 | (0) |
| 2016– | Seoul E-Land | 37 | (1) |
| 2017–2018 | → Asan Mugunghwa (army) | 31 | (1) |
- * Club domestic league appearances and goals as of 28 January 2019

Kim Dong-chul (Korean: 김동철; born 1 October 1990) is a South Korean footballer who plays as defender for Seoul E-Land.
