= Kim Dong Chul (businessman) =

Korean-American businessman (born 1953)

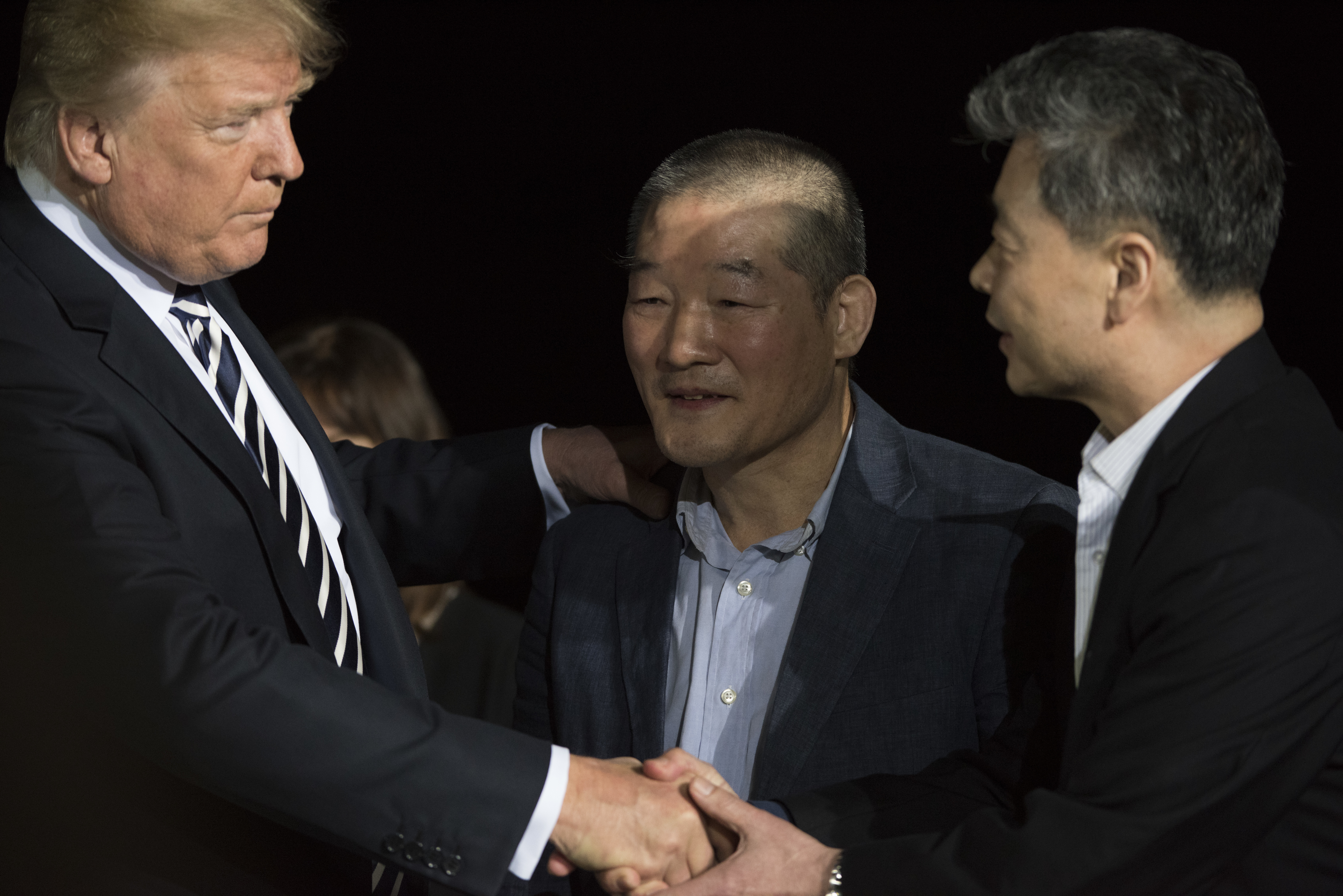
- Kim (center) with President Donald Trump after his release in 2018
- Born: 1953 (age 72–73); South Korea
- Occupation: Businessman

Detainment
- Country: North Korea
- Detained: October 2015
- Released: May 9, 2018
- Days in detention: 950
- Sentence: Ten years of hard labor
- Reason for detention: Espionage

Kim Dong Chul (born 1953) is a Korean-American businessman who was imprisoned by the government of North Korea (DPRK) in October 2015 and sentenced to 10 years of hard labor for espionage. Following his release, Kim has admitted to working with South Korea's National Intelligence Service and the United States' Central Intelligence Agency.

Kim was one of three U.S. citizens imprisoned in that country to be released on May 9, 2018. The others were Tony Kim, also known as Kim Sang-duk (arrested on April 21, 2017), and Kim Hak-song (arrested on May 7, 2017).

== Early life ==
Kim was born in Seoul, South Korea, in 1953. In 1980, he emigrated to the U.S., later becoming a Baptist pastor and a naturalized U.S. citizen. He settled in Fairfax, Virginia.

In 2000, Kim moved to China with his wife, a Chinese Korean, to work as a missionary. He subsequently applied to enter North Korea, and by 2004 was residing in the Rason Special Economic Zone, where he built a hotel.

== Imprisonment in North Korea ==
Kim was arrested in October 2015. His status was not publicly known until January 2016, when North Korean authorities introduced him to a CNN crew visiting Pyongyang. CNN was allowed to interview Kim, but only through an interpreter. In March 2016, he appeared at a government-arranged news conference in Pyongyang and "apologized for trying to steal military secrets in collusion with South Koreans"; the South Korean authorities have denied any involvement. In April 2016, North Korea sentenced Kim to 10 years of hard labor for espionage and other crimes.

Kim's arrest and captivity, according to Russell Goldman of The New York Times, followed a pattern also seen with other detentions of U.S. nationals by North Korea: "A forced confession, a show trial, a sentence to years of hard labor with little chance of appeal."

== Release ==
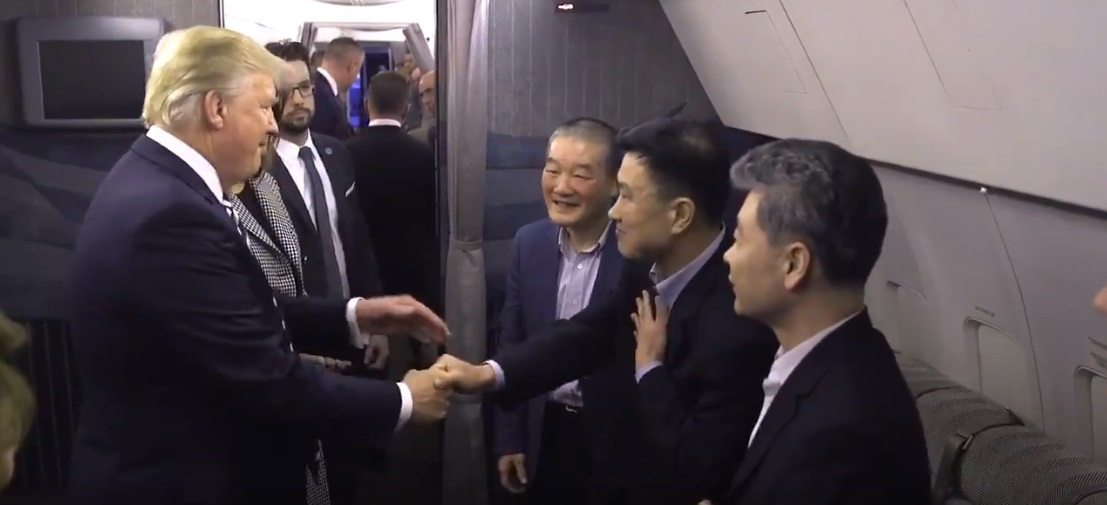
President Donald Trump and First Lady Melania Trump welcome home (from left) Kim Dong-chul, Kim Sang-duk and Kim Hak-song.

On May 9, 2018, several news outlets reported that Kim and fellow American detainees Kim Sang-duk and Kim Hak-song had been granted amnesty following a meeting between Supreme Leader Kim Jong Un and United States Secretary of State Mike Pompeo in Pyongyang to discuss details of the planned summit between Kim and President Donald Trump. The three men, alongside Pompeo, landed at Andrews Air Force Base shortly before 3 am eastern on May 10, thereby concluding a 17-month struggle by the Trump Administration to secure their release. A subsequent joint statement by the three men, and released via the State Department, states: 'We would like to express our deep appreciation to the United States government, President Trump, Secretary Pompeo, and the people of the United States for bringing us home...We thank God, and all our families and friends who prayed for us and for our return. God Bless America, the greatest nation in the world.'

=== Admission of espionage ===
In an interview with NK News published on July 29, 2019, Kim admitted that he was spying for the American CIA and South Korean NIS since 2009.

== See also ==
- List of foreign nationals detained in North Korea
