= 2011 Daegu FC season =

Daegu F.C.
2011 season
- Chairman: Kim Bum-il (Mayor)
- Manager: Lee Young-jin
- K-League: 12th
- FA Cup: Round of 32
- K-League Cup: Group round
- Top goalscorer: League: Song Je-Heon (8); All: Kim Hyun-Sung (8); Song Je-Heon (8)
- Highest home attendance: 20,187 vs Gwangju (October 9)
- Lowest home attendance: 812 vs Ulsan Mipo (May 18)
- Average home league attendance: 6,027
Home colours	Away colours

The 2011 season is Daegu FC's 9th season in South Korean K-League. It will be new kit suppliers Hummel, after two seasons with Joma.

On 18 January 2011, Daegu FC announced that Park Jong-Sun had left the club by resignation, and former Samsung Lions vice-president Kim Jae-Ha was appointed as representative director.

== Players ==
=== Squad ===
As of 21 September 2011

Note: Flags indicate national team as defined under FIFA eligibility rules; some limited exceptions apply. Players may hold more than one non-FIFA nationality.

No.	Pos.	Nation	Player
1	GK	KOR	Back Min-Chul (captain)
3	DF	KOR	Kang Yong
4	MF	KOR	Kim Kee-Hee
5	DF	KOR	Yoo Kyoung-Youl (vice-captain)
6	DF	KOR	Song Han-Bok
9	MF	BRA	Matheus (on loan from Avaí)
10	MF	BRA	Juninho (on loan from Nacional)
11	MF	KOR	Hwang Il-Su
12	FW	KOR	Im Sung-Taek
14	FW	KOR	Han Dong-Won (on loan from Seongnam)
15	MF	KOR	Choi Ho-Jung
16	MF	KOR	Song Chang-Ho
17	DF	KOR	Lee Ji-Nam
18	FW	KOR	Kim Hyun-Sung (on loan from Seoul)
19	FW	BRA	Thiago Quirino
22	MF	KOR	Kim Dae-Yeol
23	DF	KOR	Yoon Si-Ho
24	DF	KOR	Park Jong-Jin
25	MF	KOR	Lee Hyung-Sang
27	FW	KOR	Kim Min-Koo

No.	Pos.	Nation	Player
28	MF	KOR	Choi You-Sang
29	MF	KOR	Kim You-Sung
30	DF	KOR	Lee Jun-Hee
31	GK	KOR	Lee Yang-Jong
32	MF	KOR	Kim Jong-Baek
33	FW	KOR	Song Je-Heon
34	DF	KOR	Kim Dae-Hun
35	DF	KOR	Kim Byung-Gyu
36	FW	KOR	Byun Yoon-Chul
37	MF	KOR	Min Ki
38	DF	KOR	Kim Hyeok
39	MF	KOR	Jeon Ho-Yeon
40	DF	KOR	An Seok-Ho
41	GK	KOR	Park Jun-Hyuk
42	DF	KOR	Kim Ju-Hwan
44	MF	KOR	An Sang-Hyun
45	MF	KOR	Lee Kwang-Jin (on loan from FC Seoul)
46	MF	KOR	Kyung Jae-Yoon (on loan from FC Seoul)
48	DF	KOR	Park Jung-Sik
55	DF	KOR	Ahn Jae-Hoon

=== Players in / out ===
==== In ====
Date	Pos.	No.	Player	From	Fee	Ref (Korean)
9 November 2010	DF	5	(South Korea) Ahn Jae-Hoon	(South Korea) Konkuk University	Drafted	Daegu FC
9 November 2010	MF	4	(South Korea) Kim Ki-hee	(South Korea) Hongik University	Drafted	Daegu FC
9 November 2010	FW	28	(South Korea) Choi Yoo-Sang	(South Korea) Kwandong University	Drafted	Daegu FC
9 November 2010	FW	12	(South Korea) Im Sung-Taek	(South Korea) Ajou University	Drafted	Daegu FC
9 November 2010	DF	30	(South Korea) Lee Joon-Hee	(South Korea) Kyung Hee University	Drafted	Daegu FC
9 November 2010	GK	31	(South Korea) Lee Yang-Jong	(South Korea) Kwandong University	Drafted	Daegu FC
9 November 2010	DF	34	(South Korea) Kim Dae-Hoon	(South Korea) Korea University	Drafted	Daegu FC
9 November 2010	FW	27	(South Korea) Kim Min-Koo	(South Korea) Gangneung City FC	Drafted	Daegu FC
9 November 2010	MF	32	(South Korea) Kim Jong-Baek	(South Korea) Daegu University	Drafted	Daegu FC
29 November 2010	MF	16	(South Korea) Song Chang-Ho	(South Korea) Pohang Steelers	Traded	Daegu FC
4 January 2011	DF	6	(South Korea) Song Han-Bok	(South Korea) Chunnam Dragons	Traded	Daegu FC
4 January 2011	MF	14	(South Korea) Kim Seung-Hyun	(South Korea) Chunnam Dragons	Traded	Daegu FC
4 January 2011	FW	29	(South Korea) Lee Sung-Min	(South Korea) Gangneung City FC	Free	Daegu FC
4 January 2011	MF	25	(South Korea) Lee Hyung-Sang	(Czech Republic) Baník Ostrava	Free	Daegu FC
4 January 2011	DF	17	(South Korea) Lee Ji-Nam	(South Korea) Gyeongnam FC	Undisclosed	Daegu FC
4 January 2011	GK	21	(South Korea) Joo Jae-Duk	(South Korea) Jeonbuk Hyundai	Free	Daegu FC
27 January 2011	FW	19	(Brazil) Thiago Quirino	(Japan) Consadole Sapporo	Undisclosed	Daegu FC
8 February 2011	DF	36	(South Korea) Byun Yoon-Cheol	(South Korea) Incheon United	Free	imaeil.com
8 February 2011	GK	41	(South Korea) Park Jun-Hyuk	(South Korea) Gyeongnam FC	Free	imaeil.com
17 February 2011	DF	35	(South Korea) Kim Byung-Kyu	(South Korea) Taekyeung College	Free	Daegu FC
17 February 2011	DF	38	(South Korea) Kim Hyeok	(South Korea) Jeonbuk Hyundai	Free	Daegu FC
17 February 2011	MF	39	(South Korea) Jeon Ho-Yeon	(South Korea) FC Seoul	Free	Daegu FC
17 February 2011	MF	37	(South Korea) Min Ki	(South Korea) Yong-In University	Free	Daegu FC
25 February 2011	DF	44	(South Korea) An Sang-Hyun	(South Korea) FC Seoul	Undisclosed	Daegu FC
25 February 2011	MF	23	(South Korea) Yoon Si-Ho	(South Korea) FC Seoul	Undisclosed	Daegu FC
28 February 2011	DF	47	(South Korea) Yoo Kyoung-Youl	(South Korea) Ulsan Hyundai	Free	Daegu FC
28 July 2011	MF		(South Korea) Kim You-Sung	(South Korea) Gyeongnam FC	Traded	
21 September 2011	DF		(South Korea) Park Jung-Sik	(South Korea) Sangju Sangmu Phoenix	Military service	
21 September 2011	DF		(South Korea) Kim Ju-Hwan	(South Korea) Sangju Sangmu Phoenix	Military service	

==== Out ====
Date	Pos.	No.	Player	From	Fee	Ref (Korean)
31 December 2010	GK	1	(South Korea) Jo Young-Jun	(South Korea) Cheonan City	Contract expired	
31 December 2010	MF	2	(South Korea) Baek Young-Cheol	Daegu FC U-15 coach	Retired	
31 December 2010	DF	4	(South Korea) Kim Hae-Won	(South Korea) Busan Kyotong	Released	
31 December 2010	MF	5	(South Korea) Kim Hyo-Seon	Unattached	Contract expired	
31 December 2010	FW	10	(Brazil) Leo	Unattached	Released	
31 December 2010	MF	12	(Brazil) Anderson	Unattached	Released	
31 December 2010	MF	23	(South Korea) Nam Hyun-Seong	Unattached	Contract expired	
31 December 2010	MF	27	(South Korea) Lee Hyun-Chang	Unattached	Released	
31 December 2010	MF	28	(South Korea) Kim Chang-hee	(South Korea) Daejeon KHNP	Released	
31 December 2010	GK	29	(South Korea) Cho Jun-Ho	Daegu FC coach	Retired	
31 December 2010	MF	30	(South Korea) Jung Hyung-Joon	Unattached	Contract expired	
31 December 2010	GK	31	(South Korea) Park Joon-O	Unattached	Contract expired	
31 December 2010	DF	32	(South Korea) Chong Woo-Sung	Unattached	Released	
31 December 2010	MF	33	(South Korea) Kim Dong-Suk	(South Korea) Ulsan Hyundai	Loan return	
31 December 2010	MF	34	(South Korea) Choi Deuk-Ha	(South Korea) Yongin City	Contract expired	
31 December 2010	MF	35	(South Korea) Lee Ki-Eun	Unattached	Contract expired	
31 December 2010	MF	36	(South Korea) Kim Dong-Myong	(South Korea) Mokpo City	Contract expired	
31 December 2010	MF	37	(South Korea) Yu Byeong-Uk	(South Korea) Goyang Kookmin Bank	Contract expired	
31 December 2010	FW	38	(Argentina) Victor Isaac Acosta	Unattached	Released	
31 December 2010	MF	43	(South Korea) Kim Min-ho	Unattached	Released	
29 November 2010	MF	6	(South Korea) Lee Seul-Ki	(South Korea) Pohang Steelers	Traded	Daegu FC
4 January 2011	DF	16	(South Korea) Bang Dae-Jong	(South Korea) Chunnam Dragons	Traded	Daegu FC
4 January 2011	DF	55	(South Korea) Hwang Sun-Pil	(South Korea) Chunnam Dragons	Traded	Daegu FC
4 March 2011	MF	23	(South Korea) Kim Min-Kyun	(Japan) Fagiano Okayama	Contract cancellation	
28 July 2011	DF	3	(South Korea) Jeon Won-Keun	(South Korea) Gyeongnam FC	Traded	
July 2011	FW	29	(South Korea) Lee Sung-Min	(South Korea) Gangneung City FC	Transferred	

==== Loan in ====
Pos.	No.	Player	From	Start	End	Ref (Korean)
MF	10	(Brazil) Juninho	(Portugal) Nacional	25 February 2011	24 February 2012	Daegu FC
FW	14	(South Korea) Han Dong-Won	(South Korea) Seongnam Ilhwa	22 March 2011	21 March 2012	Daegu FC
FW		(Brazil) Matheus	(Brazil) Avaí	13 July 2011	31 July 2012	Daegu FC
MF		(South Korea) Kyung Jae-Yoon	(South Korea) FC Seoul	28 July 2011	31 December 2011	FC Seoul
MF		(South Korea) Lee Kwang-Jin	(South Korea) FC Seoul	28 July 2011	31 July 2012	FC Seoul

==== Loan out ====
Pos.	No.	Player	To	Start	End	Note
MF	15	(South Korea) Kim Oh-Sung	(South Korea) National Police Agency	17 December 2010	November 2012	Military service

== Club ==
=== Coaching staff ===
Position	Staff
Manager	(South Korea) Lee Young-jin
Assistant Manager	(South Korea) Kim Kwi-Hwa
Coach	(South Korea) Dang Sung-Jeung
Coach	(South Korea) Son Hyun-Joon
GK Coach	(South Korea) Cho Jun-Ho
Team Doctor	(South Korea) Kim Ki-Hyun
Team Doctor	(South Korea) Roh Hyun-Yuk

Last updated: 15 February 2011
Source: Daegu FC

== Match results ==
=== K-League ===
Date Round	Home	Score	Away	Location

5 March 1	Gwangju	3–2	Daegu	Seo-gu, Gwangju
15:00 UTC+9	Park Ki-Dong 51', 83'; Kim Dong-Sub 78' (pen.)	Report	Hwang Il-Soo 52'; Cho Hyung-Ik 61'	Stadium: Gwangju World Cup Stadium; Attendance: 36,241; Referee: Ko Keum-Bok

13 March 2	Daegu	1–0	Gangwon	Buk-gu, Daegu
15:00 UTC+9	Song Je-Heon 18'	Report		Stadium: Daegu Civil Stadium; Attendance: 13,427; Referee: Woo Sang-Il

20 March 3	Incheon United	1–1	Daegu	Seo-gu, Incheon
15:00 UTC+9	Diego Giaretta 45'	Report	Lee Ji-Nam 29'	Stadium: Incheon Munhak Stadium; Attendance: 5,326; Referee: Lee Dong-Joon

2 April 4	Daegu	1–0	Chunnam Dragons	Buk-gu, Daegu
17:00 UTC+9	Lee Ji-Nam 89'	Report		Stadium: Daegu Civil Stadium; Attendance: 4,892; Referee: Lee Jong-Gook

9 April 5	Daegu	2–1	Gyeongnam	Buk-gu, Daegu
17:00 UTC+9	Kim Hyun-Sung 29'; Park Jong-Jin (yellow card) 60' (yellow-red card) 61'; Song Chang-Ho 90+2' (pen.)	Report	Yoon Bit-Garam 84' (pen.)	Stadium: Daegu Civil Stadium; Attendance: 6,537; Referee: Kim Seong-Ho

16 April 6	Busan I'Park	2–2	Daegu	Yeonje-gu, Busan
15:00 UTC+9	Han Sang-Woon 25'; Yang Dong-Hyun 81' (pen.)	Report	Song Je-Heon 22'; Song Chang-Ho 75'	Stadium: Busan Asiad Stadium; Attendance: 3,111; Referee: Moon Jin-Hee

24 April 7	Daegu	1–2	Jeonbuk Hyundai Motors	Buk-gu, Daegu
15:00 UTC+9	Thiago Quirino 67'	Report	Kim Dong-Chan 23'; Kim Ji-Woong 38'	Stadium: Daegu Civil Stadium; Attendance: 6,348; Referee: Yoo Seon-Ho

30 April 8	Ulsan Hyundai	2–1	Daegu	Nam-gu, Ulsan
17:00 UTC+9	Lee Jae-Seong (yellow card) 14' (yellow-red card) 16'; Go Seul-Ki 45'; Kim Shin-Wook 52'	Report	Juninho 17' (pen.)	Stadium: Munsu Cup Stadium; Attendance: 5,609; Referee: Lee Min-Hoo

8 May 9	Jeju United	3–0	Daegu	Seogwipo, Jeju
15:00 UTC+9	Santos 27'; Kim Eun-Jung 77'; Bae Ki-Jong 88'	Report	An Sang-Hyun (yellow card) 33' (yellow-red card) 73'	Stadium: Jeju World Cup Stadium; Attendance: 3,547; Referee: Kim Sung-Ho

14 May 10	Daegu	Postponed	Sangju Sangmu Phoenix	Buk-gu, Daegu
19:00 UTC+9				Stadium: Daegu Civil Stadium

21 May 11	Seoul	0–2	Daegu	Mapo-gu, Seoul
20:00 UTC+9		Report	Lee Sang-Duk 44'; An Sung-Min 67'	Stadium: Seoul World Cup Stadium; Attendance: 14,817; Referee: Moon Jin-Hee

28 May 12	Pohang Steelers	2–2	Daegu	Pohang, Gyeongbuk
15:00 UTC+9	Kim Jae-Sung 6'; Kim Gi-Dong 18' (pen.)	Report	An Sung-Min 37'; Thiago Quirino 44'	Stadium: Steelyard Stadium; Attendance: 14,469; Referee: Lee Jong-Gook

5 June Re-10	Daegu	0–0	Sangju Sangmu Phoenix	Buk-gu, Daegu
19:00 UTC+9		Report		Stadium: Daegu Civil Stadium; Attendance: 3,053; Referee: Lee Min-Hoo

11 June 13	Daegu	1–1	Daejeon Citizen	Buk-gu, Daegu
19:00 UTC+9	An Sung-Min 51'; Park Jun-Hyuk (red card) 86'	Report	Yoon Si-Ho 57' (o.g.)	Stadium: Daegu Civil Stadium; Attendance: 2,037; Referee: Lee Dong-Jun

18 June 14	Suwon Samsung Bluewings	4–1	Daegu	Suwon, Gyeonggi
19:30 UTC+9	Yeom Ki-Hun 14', 62' (pen.), 65'; Marcel 26'	Report	Kim Hyun-Sung 11'	Stadium: Suwon World Cup Stadium; Attendance: 17,145; Referee: Ahn Yong-Hee

25 June 15	Daegu	2–1	Seongnam Ilhwa Chunma	Buk-gu, Daegu
19:00 UTC+9	Juninho 21' (pen.); Quirino 90+2'	Report	Namgung Do 74'	Stadium: Daegu Civil Stadium; Attendance: 1,127; Referee: Hong Jin-Ho

2 July 16	Sangju Sangmu Phoenix	1–2	Daegu	Sangju, Gyeongbuk
19:00 UTC+9	Kim Jung-Woo 9'; Kwon Sun-Tae (yellow card) 21' (yellow-red card) 68'	Report	Kim Min-Koo 29'; Kim Hyun-Sung 32'; Quirino (yellow card) 75' (yellow-red card) 90'	Stadium: Sangju Stadium; Attendance: 11,635; Referee: Ko Keum-Bok

9 July 17	Daegu	2–3	Busan I'Park	Buk-gu, Daegu
19:00 UTC+9	Yoo Kyoung-Youl 35'; Hwang Il-Su 68'	Report	Yoo Kyoung-Youl 60' (o.g.); Lim Sang-Hyub 85'; Han Sang-Woon 90+2'	Stadium: Daegu Civil Stadium; Attendance: 1,027; Referee: Kim Sang-Woo

17 July 18	Chunnam Dragons	3–1	Daegu	Gwangyang, Jeonnam
19:00 UTC+9	Kim Myung-Joong 1'; Shin Young-Jun 54'; Reina 45+8' (pen.)	Report	Song Je-Heon 36'; Kim Min-Koo (red card) 60'; Quirino (red card) 45+6'	Stadium: Gwangyang Stadium; Attendance: 6,955; Referee: Lee Sang-Yong

23 July 19	Daegu	1–1	Pohang Steelers	Buk-gu, Daegu
19:00 UTC+9	Song Je-Heon (yellow card) 17' (red card) 85'; Kim Hyun-Sung 90+1'	Report	Kim Jae-Sung 42'; Shin Hyung-Min (yellow card) 63' (yellow-red card) 89'	Stadium: Daegu Civil Stadium; Attendance: 5,427; Referee: Moon Jin-Hee

6 August 20	Daegu	0–2	Jeju United	Buk-gu, Daegu
19:00 UTC+9		Report	Kim Young-Sin 30'; Lee Hyun-Ho 63'	Stadium: Daegu Civil Stadium; Attendance: 4,128; Referee: Lee Jong-Guk

13 August 21	Jeonbuk Hyundai Motors	2–2	Daegu	Jeonju, Jeonbuk
19:00 UTC+9	Eninho 38'; Sim Woo-Yeon 70'	Report	Kim Hyun-Sung 58'; Matheus 87'	Stadium: Jeonju World Cup Stadium; Attendance: 14,914; Referee: Yoo Seon-Ho

20 August 22	Daegu	Postponed	Gwangju	Buk-gu, Daegu
19:00 UTC+9				Stadium: Daegu Civil Stadium

27 August 23	Seongnam Ilhwa Chunma	1–0	Daegu FC	Seongnam, Gyeonggi
19:00 UTC+9	Cho Dong-Geon 19' (pen.)	Report		Stadium: Tancheon Sports Complex; Attendance: 3,899; Referee: Lee Dong-Jun

9 September 24	Daegu	2–1	Seoul	Buk-gu, Daegu
19:00 UTC+9	Kim Hyun-Sung 31', 34'	Report	Bang Seung-Hwan 53'	Stadium: Daegu Civil Stadium; Attendance: 5,612; Referee: Ahn Yong-Hee

17 September 25	Daejeon Citizen	2–2	Daegu	Yuseong-gu, Daejeon
19:00 UTC+9	Kim Seong-Jun 33'; Park Sung-Ho 85' (pen.)	Report	Song Je-Heon 1', 24'	Stadium: Daejeon World Cup Stadium; Attendance: 12,952; Referee: Ko Keum-Bok

24 September 26	Daegu	1–2	Suwon Samsung Bluewings	Buk-gu, Daegu
19:00 UTC+9	Song Je-Heon 90+1'	Report	Yeom Ki-Hun 23'; Lee Sang-ho 75'	Stadium: Daegu Civil Stadium; Attendance: 14,326; Referee: Choi Myung-Yong

2 October 27	Daegu	2–0	Incheon United	Buk-gu, Daegu
15:00 UTC+9	Song Je-Heon 46', 60'	Report		Stadium: Daegu Civil Stadium; Attendance: 3,215; Referee: Kim Sung-Ho

9 October Re-22	Daegu	1–2	Gwangju	Suseong-gu, Daegu
15:00 UTC+9	Yoo Kyoung-Youl 63'	Report	Jeong Woo-In 9'; Ahn Sung-Nam 36'	Stadium: Daegu Stadium; Attendance: 20,187; Referee: Choi Kwang-Bo

16 October 28	Gyeongnam	3–0	Daegu	Changwon, Gyeongnam
17:00 UTC+9	Jordán 44', 79'; Yoon Il-Rok 71'	Report	Kim Dae-Yeol (red card) 38'	Stadium: Changwon Football Center; Attendance: 5,138; Referee: Lee Dong-Jun

23 October 29	Gangwon	1–0	Daegu	Gangneung, Gangwon
15:00 UTC+9	Kim Jin-Yong 54'	Report		Stadium: Gangneung Stadium; Attendance: 8,826; Referee: Choi Myung-Yong

30 October 30	Daegu	0–0	Ulsan Hyundai	Suseong-gu, Daegu
15:00 UTC+9		Report		Stadium: Daegu Stadium; Attendance: 5,814; Referee: Hong Jin-Ho

==== League table ====
Pos	Team	Pld	W	D	L	GF	GA	GD	Pts
11	Gwangju FC	30	9	8	13	32	43	−11	35
12	Daegu FC	30	8	9	13	35	46	−11	33
13	Incheon United	30	6	14	10	31	40	−9	32

Source: K League
Rules for classification: 1) Points; 2) Goal difference; 3) Goals scored

Pos	Team	Qualification
1	Jeonbuk Hyundai Motors (C)	Qualification for the Champions League group stage
2	Ulsan Hyundai	Qualification for the Champions League group stage
3	Pohang Steelers	Qualification for the Champions League playoff round
4	Suwon Samsung Bluewings	
5	FC Seoul	
6	Busan IPark	

Source: RSSSF
(C) Champions

==== Results summary ====
Overall								Home						Away					
Pld	W	D	L	GF	GA	GD	Pts	W	D	L	GF	GA	GD	W	D	L	GF	GA	GD
30	8	9	13	35	46	−11	33	6	4	5	17	16	+1	2	5	8	18	30	−12

==== Results by round ====
Round	1	2	3	4	5	6	7	8	9	10	11	12	13	14	15	16	17	18	19	20	21	22	23	24	25	26	27	28	29	30
Ground	A	H	A	H	H	A	H	A	A	A	A	H	H	A	H	A	H	A	H	H	A	A	H	A	H	H	H	A	A	H
Result	L	W	D	W	W	D	L	L	L	W	D	D	D	L	W	W	L	L	D	L	D	L	W	D	L	W	L	L	L	D
Position	10	8	9	7	3	4	8	8	12	13	11	10	9	13	10	8	10	12	11	11	12	13	11	11	12	11	11	12	12	12

Updated to match(es) played on 30 October 2011. Source: League Fixtures and Results
A = Away; H = Home; W = Win; D = Draw; L = Loss

=== Korean FA Cup ===
18 May Round of 32	Daegu	2–3 (a.e.t.)	Ulsan Hyundai Mipo Dockyard	Suseong-gu, Daegu
19:00 UTC+9	Cho Hyung-Ik 53'; Kim Hyun-Sung 55'; Quirino (yellow card) 74' (yellow-red card) 77'		Ki Hyun-Seo 22'; Alex 40'; Kim Hyo-Il (yellow card) 42' (yellow-red card) 75'; Kim Jang-Hyun 102'	Stadium: Daegu Stadium; Attendance: 812; Referee: Kim Wan-Tae

=== League Cup ===
16 March Group round	Daegu	0–2	Gyeongnam	Buk-gu, Daegu
19:00 UTC+9		Report	Kim Young-Woo 30'; Lucio 70'	Stadium: Daegu Civil Stadium; Attendance: 952; Referee: Kim Sang-Woo

6 April Group round	Incheon United	0–0	Daegu	Seo-gu, Incheon
19:00 UTC+9		Report		Stadium: Incheon Munhak Stadium; Attendance: 2,351; Referee: Ko Hyung-Jin

20 April Group round	Pohang Steelers	0–1	Daegu	Pohang, Gyeongbuk
19:30 UTC+9		Report	Hwang Il-Su 10'	Stadium: Steelyard Stadium; Attendance: 7,817; Referee: Lim Won-Taek

5 May Group round	Daegu	0–2	Seongnam Ilhwa Chunma	Buk-gu, Daegu
15:00 UTC+9		Report	Hong Cheol 80'; Kim Deok-Il 84'	Stadium: Daegu World Cup Stadium; Attendance: 9,744; Referee: Ko Keum-Bok

11 May Group round	Daejeon Citizen	1–1	Daegu	Yuseong-gu, Daejeon
15:00 UTC+9	Park Min-Keun 12'	Report	Hwang Il-Su 28'	Stadium: Daejeon World Cup Stadium; Attendance: 1,775; Referee: Woo Sang-Il

== Squad statistics ==
=== Appearances and goals ===
Statistics accurate as of match played 30 October 2011

Numbers in parentheses denote appearances as substitute.

No.	Nat.	Pos.	Name	League		FA Cup		League Cup		Total	
No.	Nat.	Pos.	Name	Apps	Goals	Apps	Goals	Apps	Goals	Apps	Goals
1	KOR	GK	Back Min-Chul	10	0	1	0	0	0	11 (0)	0
3	KOR	DF	Kang Yong	8 (1)	0	0	0	0	0	8 (1)	0
4	KOR	MF	Kim Ki-hee	11 (1)	0	0	0	2	0	13 (1)	0
5	KOR	DF	Yoo Kyoung-Youl	16 (1)	2	1	0	4	0	21 (1)	2
6	KOR	DF	Song Han-Bok	23	0	1	0	1	0	25 (0)	0
9	BRA	FW	Matheus	2 (7)	1	0	0	0	0	2 (7)	1
10	BRA	MF	Juninho	15	2	1	0	1 (1)	0	17 (1)	2
11	KOR	FW	Hwang Il-Su	16 (10)	2	1	0	3 (2)	2	20 (12)	4
12	KOR	FW	Im Sung-Taek	0	0	0	0	0	0	0	0
14	KOR	MF	Han Dong-Won	3 (8)	0	0 (1)	0	1 (1)	0	4 (10)	0
15	KOR	MF	Choi Ho-Jung	2 (4)	0	0	0	1 (1)	0	3 (5)	0
16	KOR	MF	Song Chang-Ho	17 (6)	2	1	0	2	0	20 (6)	2
17	KOR	DF	Lee Ji-Nam	20 (6)	2	0	0	2	0	22 (6)	2
18	KOR	FW	Kim Hyun-Sung	23 (3)	7	0 (1)	1	3	0	26 (4)	8
19	BRA	FW	Thiago Quirino	7 (5)	3	1	0	0 (2)	0	8 (7)	3
22	KOR	MF	Kim Dae-Yeol	7	0	0	0	1	0	8 (0)	0
23	KOR	DF	Yoon Si-Ho	19 (1)	0	1	0	5	0	25 (1)	0
24	KOR	DF	Park Jong-Jin	17	0	0	0	1	0	18 (0)	0
25	KOR	MF	Lee Hyung-Sang	0 (4)	0	0	0	3	0	3 (4)	0
27	KOR	FW	Kim Min-Koo	8 (10)	1	0	0	2 (1)	0	10 (11)	1
28	KOR	MF	Choi You-Sang	0	0	0	0	0	0	0	0
29	KOR	MF	Kim You-Sung	3 (3)	0	0	0	0	0	3 (3)	0
30	KOR	DF	Lee Jun-Hee	0	0	0	0	0	0	0	0
31	KOR	GK	Lee Yang-Jong	1	0	0	0	0	0	1 (0)	0
32	KOR	MF	Kim Jong-Baek	0	0	0	0	0	0	0	0
33	KOR	FW	Song Je-Heon	19 (4)	8	0	0	1 (1)	0	20 (5)	8
34	KOR	DF	Kim Dae-Hun	0	0	0	0	0	0	0	0
35	KOR	FW	Kim Byung-Gyu	0	0	0	0	0	0	0	0
36	KOR	FW	Byun Yoon-Chul	0	0	0	0	0	0	0	0
37	KOR	MF	Min Ki	0	0	0	0	0	0	0	0
38	KOR	DF	Kim Hyeok	0	0	0	0	0	0	0	0
39	KOR	MF	Jeon Ho-Yeon	0	0	0	0	0	0	0	0
40	KOR	FW	An Seok-Ho	0	0	0	0	0	0	0	0
41	KOR	GK	Park Jun-Hyuk	19	0	0	0	4	0	23 (0)	0
42	KOR	DF	Kim Ju-Hwan	0	0	0	0	0	0	0	0
44	KOR	MF	An Sang-Hyun	7 (6)	0	1	0	2	0	10 (6)	0
45	KOR	MF	Lee Kwang-Jin	0	0	0	0	0	0	0	0
46	KOR	MF	Kyung Jae-Yoon	0	0	0	0	0	0	0	0
48	KOR	DF	Park Jung-Sik	0	0	0	0	0	0	0	0
55	KOR	DF	Ahn Jae-Hoon	17 (1)	0	1	0	2	0	20 (1)	0
2	KOR	MF	Oh Ju-Hyun (out)	1	0	0	0	3	0	4 (0)	0
3	KOR	DF	Jeon Won-Keun (out)	0	0	0	0	0	0	0	0
7	KOR	MF	On Byung-Hoon (out)	5 (3)	0	0 (1)	0	3 (2)	0	8 (6)	0
8	KOR	DF	An Sung-Min (out)	8	3	0	0	2 (1)	0	10 (1)	3
13	KOR	FW	Cho Hyung-Ik (out)	13	1	0 (1)	1	2 (2)	0	15 (3)	2
20	KOR	DF	Yang Seung-Won (out)	0	0	0	0	0	0	0	0
21	KOR	GK	Joo Jae-Duk (out)	0	0	0	0	0	0	0	0
26	KOR	DF	Lee Sang-Duk (out)	13	1	1	0	3	0	17 (0)	1
29	KOR	FW	Lee Sung-Min (out)	0	0	0	0	0 (1)	0	0 (1)	0

=== Top scorers ===
Rank	Nation	Number	Name	K-League	KFA Cup	League Cup	Total
1	(South Korea)	33	Song Je-Heon	8	0	0	8
=	(South Korea)	18	Kim Hyun-Sung	7	1	0	8
2	(South Korea)	11	Hwang Il-Su	2	0	2	4
3	(South Korea)	8	An Sung-Min	3	0	0	3
=	(Brazil)	19	Thiago Quirino	3	0	0	3
4	(South Korea)	5	Yoo Kyoung-Youl	2	0	0	2
=	(Brazil)	10	Juninho	2	0	0	2
=	(South Korea)	16	Song Chang-Ho	2	0	0	2
=	(South Korea)	17	Lee Ji-Nam	2	0	0	2
=	(South Korea)	13	Cho Hyung-Ik	1	1	0	2
5	(Brazil)	9	Matheus	1	0	0	1
=	(South Korea)	26	Lee Sang-Duk	1	0	0	1
=	(South Korea)	27	Kim Min-Koo	1	0	0	1
/	/	/	Own Goals	0	0	0	0
/	/	/	TOTALS	35	2	2	39

=== Top assistors ===
Rank	Nation	Number	Name	K-League	KFA Cup	League Cup	Total
1	(South Korea)	23	Yoon Si-Ho	3	0	0	3
=	(South Korea)	11	Hwang Il-Su	3	0	0	3
=	(South Korea)	16	Song Chang-Ho	3	0	0	3
=	(Brazil)	10	Juninho	2	1	0	3
2	(South Korea)	6	Song Han-Bok	2	0	0	2
=	(South Korea)	18	Kim Hyun-Sung	2	0	0	2
=	(South Korea)	55	Ahn Jae-Hoon	2	0	0	2
=	(Brazil)	19	Thiago Quirino	1	1	0	2
3	(South Korea)	13	Cho Hyung-Ik	1	0	0	1
=	(South Korea)	17	Lee Ji-Nam	1	0	0	1
=	(South Korea)	25	Lee Hyung-Sang	1	0	0	1
=	(South Korea)	27	Kim Min-Koo	1	0	0	1
/	/	/	TOTALS	22	2	0	24

=== Discipline ===
Position	Nation	Number	Name	K-League		KFA Cup		League Cup		Total	
Position	Nation	Number	Name	Booked	Sent off (straight red)	Booked	Sent off (straight red)	Booked	Sent off (straight red)	Booked	Sent off (straight red)
GK	(South Korea)	1	Back Min-Chul	1	0	0	0	0	0	1	0
MF	(South Korea)	2	Oh Ju-Hyun	2	0	0	0	1	0	3	0
DF	(South Korea)	3	Kang Yong	3	0	0	0	0	0	3	0
DF	(South Korea)	4	Kim Ki-hee	1	0	0	0	0	0	1	0
DF	(South Korea)	5	Yoo Kyoung-Youl	2	0	0	0	0	0	2	0
DF	(South Korea)	6	Song Han-Bok	7	0	0	0	0	0	7	0
MF	(South Korea)	7	On Byung-Hoon	0	0	0	0	1	0	1	0
DF	(South Korea)	8	An Sung-Min	2	0	0	0	2	0	4	0
MF	(Brazil)	10	Juninho	4	0	0	0	0	0	4	0
FW	(South Korea)	11	Hwang Il-Su	3	0	0	0	0	0	3	0
FW	(South Korea)	13	Cho Hyung-Ik	4	0	1	0	0	0	5	0
FW	(South Korea)	14	Han Dong-Won	1	0	0	0	0	0	1	0
MF	(South Korea)	15	Choi Ho-Jung	0	0	0	0	1	0	1	0
MF	(South Korea)	16	Song Chang-Ho	4	0	0	0	1	0	5	0
DF	(South Korea)	17	Lee Ji-Nam	2	0	0	0	1	0	3	0
FW	(South Korea)	18	Kim Hyun-Sung	1	0	0	0	0	0	1	0
FW	(Brazil)	19	Thiago Quirino	2	2	2	1	0	0	4	3
MF	(South Korea)	22	Kim Dae-Yeol	1	1	0	0	0	0	1	1
DF	(South Korea)	23	Yoon Si-Ho	3	0	0	0	0	0	3	0
DF	(South Korea)	24	Park Jong-Jin	3	1	0	0	0	0	3	1
MF	(South Korea)	25	Lee Hyung-Sang	1	0	0	0	0	0	1	0
DF	(South Korea)	26	Lee Sang-Duk	3	0	0	0	0	0	3	0
FW	(South Korea)	27	Kim Min-Koo	1	1	0	0	1	0	2	1
FW	(South Korea)	29	Lee Sung-Min	0	0	0	0	1	0	1	0
GK	(South Korea)	31	Lee Yang-Jong	1	0	0	0	0	0	1	0
FW	(South Korea)	33	Song Je-Heon	4	1	0	0	0	0	4	1
GK	(South Korea)	41	Park Jun-Hyuk	2	1	0	0	1	0	3	1
MF	(South Korea)	44	An Sang-Hyun	6	1	0	0	1	0	7	1
DF	(South Korea)	55	Ahn Jae-Hoon	2	0	1	0	0	0	3	0
/	/	/	TOTALS	66	8	4	1	11	0	81	9

== See also ==
- Daegu F.C.
