= 2012 Daegu FC season =

Daegu FC
2012 season
- Chairman: Kim Bum-il (Mayor)
- Manager: Moacir Pereira
- K-League: 7th
- FA Cup: Round of 32
- Top goalscorer: League: Song Je-Heon (3); Lee Jin-Ho (3); All: Song Je-Heon (3); Lee Jin-Ho (3)
- Highest home attendance: 21,750 vs Pohang (April 28)
- Lowest home attendance: 3,655 vs Gyeongnam (April 11)
- Average home league attendance: 10,668 (as of April 28)
Home colours	Away colours	Third colours

The 2012 season was Daegu FC's tenth season in the K-League in South Korea. Daegu FC will be competing in K-League and Korean FA Cup.

== Current squad ==
Note: Flags indicate national team as defined under FIFA eligibility rules; some limited exceptions apply. Players may hold more than one non-FIFA nationality.

No.	Pos.	Nation	Player
1	GK	KOR	Park Jun-Hyuk
2	DF	KOR	Cho Young-Hoon
3	DF	KOR	Kang Yong (vice-captain)
4	MF	KOR	Kim Kee-Hee
5	DF	KOR	Yoo Kyoung-Youl (captain)
6	DF	KOR	Song Han-Bok
7	MF	BRA	Leandrinho
8	MF	BRA	Matheus
10	MF	BRA	Dinélson
11	FW	KOR	Hwang Il-Su
13	MF	KOR	Park Su-Chang
14	MF	KOR	Hwang Soon-Min
15	MF	KOR	Choi Ho-Jung
16	MF	KOR	Song Chang-Ho
17	DF	KOR	Lee Ji-Nam
18	FW	KOR	Kang Hyun-Young
19	FW	KOR	Lee Jin-Ho

No.	Pos.	Nation	Player
20	MF	KOR	An Sang-Hyun
21	GK	KOR	Kim Kyo-Bin
22	MF	KOR	Kim Dae-Yeol
23	GK	KOR	Lee Youn-Kyu
24	DF	KOR	Park Jong-Jin
25	MF	KOR	Jeong An-Mo
26	MF	KOR	Lee Kwang-Jin (on loan from FC Seoul)
27	FW	KOR	Kim Min-Koo
28	FW	KOR	Lee Haeng-Su
29	MF	KOR	Kim You-Sung
30	DF	KOR	Lee Joon-Hee
31	GK	KOR	Lee Yang-Jong
32	MF	KOR	Kim Ki-Soo
33	FW	KOR	Song Je-Heon
34	MF	KOR	In Joon-Yeon
55	DF	KOR	Ahn Jae-Hoon

=== Out on loan ===
Note: Flags indicate national team as defined under FIFA eligibility rules; some limited exceptions apply. Players may hold more than one non-FIFA nationality.

No.	Pos.	Nation	Player
—	FW	KOR	Kim Oh-Sung (at National Police Agency until November 2012)

== Transfer ==
=== In ===
No.	Pos.	Nation	Player
—	DF	KOR	Cho Young-Hoon (drafted)
—	MF	KOR	Hwang Soon-Min (drafted from Shonan Bellmare)
—	MF	KOR	Park Su-Chang (drafted)
—	MF	KOR	Jeong An-Mo (drafted)
—	MF	KOR	Kang Houn-Young (drafted)
—	FW	KOR	Lee Haeng-Su (drafted)
—	GK	KOR	Lee Youn-Kyu (drafted)

No.	Pos.	Nation	Player
—	MF	KOR	Kim Ki-Soo (from Busan I'Park)
—	FW	KOR	Lee Jin-Ho (from Ulsan Hyundai)
—	MF	BRA	Dinélson (from Avaí)
—	MF	BRA	Leandrinho (from Avaí)
—	MF	BRA	Matheus (from Avaí, previously on loan)
—	GK	KOR	Kim Kyo-Bin (Unattached, former Chunnam Dragons)

=== Out ===
No.	Pos.	Nation	Player
1	GK	KOR	Back Min-Chul (to Gyeongnam FC)
10	FW	BRA	Juninho (loan return to Nacional da Madeira)
12	FW	KOR	Lim Sung-Taek (released, to Suwon City FC)
14	FW	KOR	Han Dong-Won (loan return to Seongnam Ilhwa Chunma)
18	FW	KOR	Kim Hyun-Sung (loan return to FC Seoul)
19	FW	BRA	Quirino (loan return to Consadole Sapporo)
23	DF	KOR	Yoon Si-Ho (released, to FC Seoul)
25	MF	KOR	Lee Hyung-Sang (released)
28	MF	KOR	Choi Yoo-Sang (released)
32	MF	KOR	Kim Jong-Baek (contract terminated)

No.	Pos.	Nation	Player
34	DF	KOR	Kim Dae-Hun (contract terminated, to Gimhae City FC)
35	FW	KOR	Kim Byung-Gyu (contract terminated)
36	FW	KOR	Byun Yoon-Chul (released, to Manchester Howrah)
37	MF	KOR	Min Ki (contract terminated, to Cheonan City)
38	DF	KOR	Kim Hyeok (contract terminated)
39	MF	KOR	Jeon Ho-Yeon (contract terminated)
40	FW	KOR	An Seuk-Ho (contract terminated)
42	MF	KOR	Kim Joo-Hwan (contract terminated)
46	MF	KOR	Kyung Jae-Yoon (loan return to FC Seoul)
48	FW	KOR	Park Jung-Sik (released)

== Coaching staff ==
Position	Staff
Manager	(Brazil) Moacir Pereira
Assistant Manager	(Brazil) Denis
Coach	(South Korea) Dang Sung-Jeung
Coach	(South Korea) Park Man-Chun
GK Coach	(Brazil) Marcelo Giacomelli
GK Coach	(South Korea) Cho Jun-Ho
Physical Coach	(Brazil) Walter Grassman

Last updated: 4 March 2012
Source: Daegu FC

== Match results ==
=== K-League ===
All times are Korea Standard Time (KST) – UTC+9

Date Round	Home	Score	Away	Location

4 March 1	Daegu	1 – 1	Seoul	Suseong-gu, Daegu
15:00	Kang Yong 13'	Report	Molina 63'	Stadium: Daegu Stadium; Attendance: 18,857; Referee: Yoo Seon-Ho

10 March 2	Gangwon	2 – 0	Daegu	Gangneung, Gangwon
15:00	Kim Eun-Jung 74' (85), pen.'	Report	Kang Yong (yellow card) 48' (yellow-red card) 73'	Stadium: Gangneung Stadium; Attendance: 5,153; Referee: Moon Jin-Hee

17 March 3	Daegu	1 – 0	Incheon	Suseong-gu, Daegu
15:00	Lee Jin-Ho 34' (Assist by No.8)	Report		Stadium: Daegu Stadium; Attendance: 6,303; Referee: Lee Jong-Guk

25 March 4	Daegu	1 – 0	Ulsan	Suseong-gu, Daegu
17:00	Matheus 12' (Assist by No.10)	Report		Stadium: Daegu Stadium; Attendance: 5,729; Referee: Ko Hyung-Jin

31 March 5	Jeonbuk	2 – 3	Daegu	Jeonju, Jeonbuk
17:00	Luiz 20'; Lee Dong-Gook 47' (pen.)	Report	Ahn Sang-Hyun (yellow card) 45+2' (yellow-red card) 90+2'; Song Je-Heon 73' (Assist by No.7); Song Je-Heon 84'; Kim Kee-Hee 90+2' (Assist by No.11)	Stadium: Jeonju World Cup Stadium; Attendance: 7,466; Referee: An Yong-Hee

7 April 6	Jeju	2 – 0	Daegu	Seogwipo, Jeju
17:00	Robert 64'; Jair 85'	Report		Stadium: Jeju World Cup Stadium; Attendance: 5,063; Referee: Mae Ho-Young

11 April 7	Daegu	2 – 3	Gyeongnam	Suseong-gu, Daegu
15:00	Choi Ho-Jung 42' (Assist by No.10); Song Je-Heon 90' (pen.)	Report	Jordán 35'; Kim Kee-Hee 45' (o.g.); Caíque 83' (pen.)	Stadium: Daegu Stadium; Attendance: 3,655; Referee: Yoo Sun-Ho

14 April 8	Suwon	1 – 0	Daegu	Suwon, Gyeonggi
15:00	Ristić 88' (pen.)	Report	Lee Ji-Nam (yellow card) 72' (yellow-red card) 90+1'	Stadium: Suwon World Cup Stadium; Attendance: 13,867; Referee: Choi Myung-Yong

21 April 9	Daegu	2 – 1	Sangju	Suseong-gu, Daegu
15:00	Leandrinho 38'; Matheus 68'	Report	Kim Cheol-Ho 50'	Stadium: Daegu Stadium; Attendance: 7,714; Referee: Lee Jong-Guk

28 April 10	Daegu	1 – 0	Pohang	Suseong-gu, Daegu
15:00	Lee Jin-Ho 90' (Assist by No.11)	Report		Stadium: Daegu Stadium; Attendance: 21,750; Referee: Kim Sung-Ho

5 May 11	Gwangju	2 – 2	Daegu	Seo-gu, Gwangju
15:00	Park Hyun 44'; Milić 49'	Report	Kim Kee-Hee 9' (Assist by No.11); Lee Jin-Ho 25' (Assist by No.11)	Stadium: Gwangju World Cup Stadium; Attendance: 10,711; Referee: Woo Sang-Il

13 May 12	Busan	2 – 0	Daegu	Yeonje-gu, Busan
15:00	Park Jong-Woo 40'; Hwang Soon-Min 90+3' (o.g.)	Report	Kim Kee-Hee (red card) 59'	Stadium: Busan Asiad Stadium; Attendance: 5,197; Referee: Kim Wan-Tae

19 May 13	Daegu	1 – 1	Daejeon	Suseong-gu, Daegu
15:00	Song Je-Heon 57' (Assist by No.19)	Report	Kim Hyeung-Bum 48' (pen.)	Stadium: Daegu Stadium; Attendance: 7,053; Referee: Ko Hyung-Jin

26 May 14	Seongnam	0 – 0	Daegu	Seongnam, Gyeonggi
17:00	Yoon Bit-Garam (yellow card) 39' (yellow-red card) 40'	Report		Stadium: Tancheon Sports Complex; Attendance: 3,017; Referee: Kim Sung-Ho

14 June 15	Chunnam	0 – 3	Daegu	Gwangyang, Jeonnam
19:30		Report	Kim Dae-Yeol 41'; Leandrinho 49' (Assist by No.11); Song Je-Heon 76'	Stadium: Gwangyang Football Stadium; Attendance: 2,264; Referee: Woo Sang-Il

17 June 16	Daegu	1 – 5	Jeonbuk	Suseong-gu, Daegu
19:00	Song Je-Heon 87' (pen.)	Report	Droguett 26'; Eninho 53'; Lee Dong-Gook 67'; Jeong Shung-Hoon 83'; Lee Seung-Hyun 90'	Stadium: Daegu Stadium; Attendance: 5,004; Referee: Choi Myung-Yong

24 June 17	Daegu	2 – 1	Busan	Suseong-gu, Daegu
19:00	Lee Jin-Ho 35', 67'	Report	Yoon Dong-Min 0:49'	Stadium: Daegu Stadium; Attendance: 6,615; Referee: Ko Keum-Bok

27 June 18	Daejeon	2 – 2	Daegu	Yuseong-gu, Daejeon
19:00	Kim Hyeung-Bum 11'; Oris 54'	Report	Yoo Kyoung-Youl 5' (Assist by No.10); Dinélson 34' (Assist by No.7)	Stadium: Daejeon World Cup Stadium; Attendance: 6,422; Referee: Ko Hyung-Jin

==== League table ====
Pos	Team	Pld	W	D	L	GF	GA	GD	Pts
8	Gyeongnam FC	44	14	8	22	50	60	−10	50
9	Incheon United	44	17	16	11	46	40	+6	67
10	Daegu FC	44	16	13	15	55	56	−1	61
11	Jeonnam Dragons	44	13	14	17	47	60	−13	53
12	Seongnam Ilhwa Chunma	44	14	10	20	47	56	−9	52

Source: K League
Rules for classification: 1) Points; 2) Goal difference; 3) Goals scored.

==== Results summary ====
Overall								Home						Away					
Pld	W	D	L	GF	GA	GD	Pts	W	D	L	GF	GA	GD	W	D	L	GF	GA	GD
18	7	5	6	22	25	−3	26	5	2	2	12	12	0	2	3	4	10	13	−3

==== Results by round ====
Round	1	2	3	4	5	6	7	8	9	10	11	12	13	14	15	16	17	18	19	20	21	22	23	24	25	26	27	28	29	30	31	32	33	34	35	36	37	38	39	40	41	42	43	44
Ground	H	A	H	H	A	A	H	A	H	H	A	A	H	A	A	H	H	A																										
Result	D	L	W	W	W	L	L	L	W	W	D	L	D	D	W	L	W	D																										
Position	7	13	8	7	6	8	8	10	10	7	7	8	8	7	7	8	8	7																										

Updated to match(es) played on 28 June 2012. Source: League Fixtures and Results
A = Away; H = Home; W = Win; D = Draw; L = Loss

=== Korean FA Cup ===
23 May Round of 32	Daegu FC	3 – 1	Korean Police	Suseong-gu, Daegu
19:00 KST	Lee Jin-Ho 17' (Assist by No.11); Song Je-Heon 28' (pen.); Kim Dae-Yeol 59' (Assist by No.33)		Yang Dong-Hyun 71'	Stadium: Daegu Stadium; Attendance: 754; Referee: Kim Sang-Woo

20 June Round of 16	Jeju United	2 – 0	Daegu FC	Seogwipo, Jeju
19:00 KST	Seo Dong-Hyun 32'; Santos 87'			Stadium: Jeju World Cup Stadium; Attendance: 853; Referee: Choi Dae-Woo

== Squad statistics ==
=== Appearances ===
Statistics accurate as of match played 27 June 2012

No.	Nat.	Pos.	Name	League		FA Cup		Appearances		Goals
No.	Nat.	Pos.	Name	Apps	Goals	Apps	Goals	App (sub)	Total	Goals
1	(South Korea)	GK	Park Jun-Hyuk	18	0	2	0	20 (0)	20	0
2	(South Korea)	DF	Cho Young-Hoon	2 (5)	0	0 (1)	0	2 (6)	8	0
3	(South Korea)	DF	Kang Yong	7	1	1	0	8 (0)	8	1
4	(South Korea)	MF	Kim Kee-Hee	15	2	0	0	15 (0)	15	2
5	(South Korea)	DF	Yoo Kyoung-Youl	8 (1)	1	2	0	10 (1)	11	1
6	(South Korea)	DF	Song Han-Bok	3 (1)	0	0	0	3 (1)	4	0
7	(Brazil)	MF	Leandrinho	11	2	1	0	12 (0)	12	2
8	(Brazil)	MF	Matheus	8 (1)	2	0 (1)	0	8 (2)	10	2
10	(Brazil)	MF	Dinélson	8 (3)	1	1	0	9 (3)	12	1
11	(South Korea)	FW	Hwang Il-Su	11 (7)	0	1 (1)	0	12 (8)	20	0
13	(South Korea)	MF	Park Su-Chang	0 (1)	0	0	0	0 (1)	1	0
14	(South Korea)	MF	Hwang Soon-Min	2 (6)	0	0 (1)	0	2 (7)	9	0
15	(South Korea)	MF	Choi Ho-Jung	10	1	1	0	11 (0)	11	1
16	(South Korea)	MF	Song Chang-Ho	16 (1)	0	2	0	18 (1)	19	0
17	(South Korea)	DF	Lee Ji-Nam	13	0	2	0	15 (0)	15	0
18	(South Korea)	FW	Kang Hyun-Young	0	0	0	0	0	0	0
19	(South Korea)	FW	Lee Jin-Ho	13 (5)	5	1 (1)	1	14 (6)	20	6
20	(South Korea)	MF	An Sang-Hyun	14 (1)	0	2	0	16 (1)	17	0
21	(South Korea)	GK	Kim Kyo-Bin	0	0	0	0	0	0	0
22	(South Korea)	MF	Kim Dae-Yeol	10 (6)	1	2	1	12 (6)	18	2
23	(South Korea)	GK	Lee Youn-Kyu	0	0	0	0	0	0	0
24	(South Korea)	DF	Park Jong-Jin	11	0	0	0	11 (0)	11	0
25	(South Korea)	MF	Jeong An-Mo	0	0	0	0	0	0	0
26	(South Korea)	MF	Lee Kwang-Jin	0	0	0	0	0	0	0
27	(South Korea)	FW	Kim Min-Koo	0	0	0	0	0	0	0
28	(South Korea)	FW	Lee Haeng-Su	0 (4)	0	0	0	0 (4)	4	0
29	(South Korea)	MF	Kim You-Sung	2	0	0	0	2 (0)	2	0
30	(South Korea)	DF	Lee Joon-Hee	7	0	2	0	9 (0)	9	0
31	(South Korea)	GK	Lee Yang-Jong	0	0	0	0	0	0	0
32	(South Korea)	MF	Kim Ki-Soo	0	0	0	0	0	0	0
33	(South Korea)	FW	Song Je-Heon	8 (8)	6	2	1	10 (8)	18	7
34	(South Korea)	MF	In Joon-Yeon	1 (2)	0	0	0	1 (2)	3	0
55	(South Korea)	DF	Ahn Jae-Hoon	0 (1)	0	0	0	0 (1)	1	0

=== Goals and assists ===
Rank	Nation	Number	Name	K-League		KFA Cup		Sum		Total
Rank	Nation	Number	Name	Goals	Assists	Goals	Assists	Goals	Assists	Total
1	(South Korea)	33	Song Je-Heon	6	0	1	1	7	1	8
2	(South Korea)	19	Lee Jin-Ho	5	1	1	0	6	1	7
3	(South Korea)	11	Hwang Il-Su	0	5	0	1	0	6	6
4	(Brazil)	7	Leandrinho	2	2	0	0	2	2	4
=	(Brazil)	10	Dinélson	1	3	0	0	1	3	4
5	(Brazil)	8	Matheus	2	1	0	0	2	1	3
6	(South Korea)	4	Kim Kee-Hee	2	0	0	0	2	0	2
=	(South Korea)	22	Kim Dae-Yeol	1	0	1	0	2	0	2
7	(South Korea)	3	Kang Yong	1	0	0	0	1	0	1
=	(South Korea)	5	Yoo Kyoung-Youl	1	0	0	0	1	0	1
=	(South Korea)	15	Choi Ho-Jung	1	0	0	0	1	0	1
/	/	/	Own Goals	0	-	0	-	0	-	0
/	/	/	TOTALS	22	12	3	2	25	14	

=== Discipline ===
Position	Nation	Number	Name	K-League		KFA Cup		Total	
Position	Nation	Number	Name	Booked	Sent off (straight red)	Booked	Sent off (straight red)	Booked	Sent off (straight red)
DF	(South Korea)	2	Cho Young-Hoon	2	0	0	0	2	0
DF	(South Korea)	3	Kang Yong	4	1	0	0	4	1
DF	(South Korea)	4	Kim Kee-Hee	1	1	0	0	1	1
DF	(South Korea)	5	Yoo Kyoung-Youl	2	0	0	0	2	0
MF	(Brazil)	7	Leandrinho	2	0	0	0	2	0
MF	(Brazil)	8	Matheus	1	0	0	0	1	0
MF	(South Korea)	11	Hwang Il-Su	1	0	0	0	1	0
MF	(South Korea)	15	Choi Ho-Jung	2	0	0	0	2	0
MF	(South Korea)	16	Song Chang-Ho	2	0	1	0	3	0
DF	(South Korea)	17	Lee Ji-Nam	5	1	0	0	5	1
FW	(South Korea)	19	Lee Jin-Ho	2	0	0	0	2	0
MF	(South Korea)	20	An Sang-Hyun	7	1	1	0	8	1
DF	(South Korea)	24	Park Jong-Jin	3	0	0	0	3	0
DF	(South Korea)	30	Lee Joon-Hee	3	0	0	0	3	0
FW	(South Korea)	33	Song Chang-Ho	1	0	0	0	1	0
/	/	/	TOTALS	38	4	2	0	40	4
