= 2010 Daegu FC season =

Daegu F.C.
2010 season
- Chairman: Kim Bum-il (Mayor)
- Manager: Lee Young-jin
- K-League: 15th
- FA Cup: Round of 32
- K-League Cup: Quarter-finals
- Top goalscorer: League: Cho Hyung-Ik (8); All: Cho Hyung-Ik (9)
- Highest home attendance: 15,201 vs Busan I'Park (3 Oct 2010)
- Lowest home attendance: 1,118 vs Jeonbuk Hyundai Motors (27 Oct 2010)
Home colours	Away colours

The 2010 season was Daegu F.C.'s 8th season in South Korea's K-League.

== Season summary ==
Defender Bang Dae-jong, who had been with the club since his 2008 draft, was named captain for the 2010 season. Brazilian forward Leo returned for another season, supported by fellow Brazilian striker, Anderson. Young Argentine defender Lucas Basualdo also joined the club but never made a significant impact, disappearing during the midseason break. Anderson left the club around the same time and was replaced by another young Argentine Issac, who saw limited playing time.

On the field, Daegu repeated their disappointing performances from the previous season, finishing 15th in the K-League standings, level on points with Gwangju Sangmu. Their defense was particularly weak, conceding the most goals in the league. Out of 28 games, Daegu lost 19, with only five wins and four draws. Offensively, the team also struggled, with Cho Hyung-Ik leading the club in scoring with eight goals.

Daegu's performance in the FA Cup was similarly disappointing, losing 0:1 to National League side Suwon City in extra time. However, they had better success in the League Cup, advancing out of the group stage to the knockout rounds with victories over Daejeon and Busan. In the first knockout match, Daegu drew FC Seoul. Despite forcing a 2–2 draw in extra time, Daegu ultimately lost in the penalty shootout.

== Squad ==
Note: Flags indicate national team as defined under FIFA eligibility rules; some limited exceptions apply. Players may hold more than one non-FIFA nationality.

No.	Pos.	Nation	Player
1	GK	KOR	Jo Young-Jun
2	MF	KOR	Baek Young-Cheol
3	DF	KOR	Jeon Won-Keun
4	DF	KOR	Kim Hae-Won
5	MF	KOR	Kim Hyo-Seon
6	MF	KOR	Lee Seul-Ki
7	MF	KOR	Kim Min-Kyun
8	DF	KOR	Ahn Seong-Min
9	FW	KOR	Jang Nam-Seok
10	MF	BRA	Léo
11	FW	KOR	Hwang Il-Soo
12	FW	BRA	Anderson
13	MF	KOR	Cho Hyung-Ik
14	MF	KOR	Ohn Byung-Hoon
15	MF	KOR	Kim Oh-Sung
16	DF	KOR	Bang Dae-Jong (Captain)
17	MF	KOR	Oh Joo-Hyun
18	MF	KOR	Choi Ho-Jeong
19	MF	KOR	Song Je-Heon
20	DF	KOR	Yang Seung-Won

No.	Pos.	Nation	Player
21	GK	KOR	Back Min-Chul
22	MF	KOR	Kim Dae-Yeol
23	MF	KOR	Nam Hyun-Seong
24	DF	KOR	Park Jong-Jin
25	FW	KOR	Kim Hyun-Sung (On loan from Seoul)
26	DF	KOR	Lee Sang-Deok
27	MF	KOR	Lee Hyun-Chang
28	MF	KOR	Kim Chang-hee
29	GK	KOR	Cho Jun-Ho
30	MF	KOR	Jeong Hyung-Jun
31	GK	KOR	Park Jun-Oh
32	DF	KOR	Chong Woo-Sung
33	MF	KOR	Kim Dong-Suk (On loan from Ulsan)
34	MF	KOR	Choi Deuk-Ha
35	MF	KOR	Lee Ki-Eun
36	MF	KOR	Kim Dong-Myong
37	MF	KOR	Yu Byeong-Uk
38	FW	ARG	Victor Isaac Acosta
43	MF	KOR	Kim Min-ho
55	DF	KOR	Hwang Sun-Pil

== Players In/Out ==
=== In ===
Date	Pos.	No.	Player	From	Type	Source (in Korean)
17 November 2009	MF	17	(South Korea) Oh Joo-Hyun	(South Korea) Korea University	Drafted	Daegu FC
17 November 2009	MF	18	(South Korea) Choi Ho-Jeong	(South Korea) Kwandong University	Drafted	Daegu FC
17 November 2009	MF	22	(South Korea) Kim Dae-Yeol	(South Korea) Dankook University	Drafted	Daegu FC
17 November 2009	FW	11	(South Korea) Hwang Il-Soo	(South Korea) Dong-A University	Drafted	Daegu FC
17 November 2009	MF	34	(South Korea) Choi Deuk-Ha	(South Korea) Myongji University	Drafted	Daegu FC
17 November 2009	MF	37	(South Korea) Yu Byeong-Uk	(South Korea) Incheon University	Drafted	Daegu FC
17 November 2009	MF	5	(South Korea) Kim Hyo-Seon	(South Korea) Yong-In University	Drafted	Daegu FC
17 November 2009	MF	30	(South Korea) Jeong Hyung-Jun	(South Korea) International University of Korea	Drafted	Daegu FC
17 November 2009	MF	35	(South Korea) Lee Ki-Eun	(South Korea) International University of Korea	Drafted	Daegu FC
17 November 2009	FW	33	(South Korea) Na Yun-Min	(South Korea) Howon University	Drafted	Daegu FC
17 November 2009	MF	36	(South Korea) Kim Dong-Myong	(South Korea) TaeKyeung University	Drafted	Daegu FC
13 January 2009	DF	3	(South Korea) Jun Won-Geun	(South Korea) Gangwon FC	Transferred	Daegu FC
5 January 2010	FW	19	(South Korea) Song Je-Heon	(South Korea) Pohang Steelers	Transferred	Daegu FC
5 January 2010	FW	25	(South Korea) Kim Hyun-Sung	(South Korea) FC Seoul	Transferred	Daegu FC
11 January 2010	DF	8	(South Korea) An Sung-Min	(South Korea) Busan I'Park	Transferred	Daegu FC
11 January 2010	DF	4	(South Korea) Maeng Jin-O	(South Korea) Pohang Steelers	Transferred	Daegu FC
1 February 2010	MF	14	(South Korea) Ohn Byung-Hoon	(South Korea) Jeonbuk Hyundai Motors	Transferred	Daegu FC
11 March 2010	FW	12	(Brazil) Anderson	(Costa Rica) Brujas FC	Transferred	imaeil.com
11 March 2010	DF	38	(Argentina) Lucas Basualdo	(Spain) Verín CF	Transferred	imaeil.com
22 March 2010	FW	12	(South Korea) Kim Dong-Suk	(South Korea) Ulsan Hyundai	Loan	Daegu FC
16 July 2010	FW	43	(South Korea) Kim Min-ho	(South Korea) Chunnam Dragons	Transferred	Daegu FC
28 July 2010	FW	38	(Argentina) Victor Isaac Acosta	(Argentina) Unión Deportiva Tres Lomas	Transferred	Daegu FC
28 July 2010	DF	4	(South Korea) Kim Hae-Won	(South Korea) Chunnam Dragons	Transferred	Daegu FC

=== Out ===
Date	Pos.	No.	Player	To	Type	Source (in Korean)
24 November 2009	DF	24	(South Korea) Park Jung-Sik	(South Korea) Gwangju Sangmu	Military service	
24 November 2009	DF	25	(South Korea) Yoon Yeo-San	(South Korea) Gwangju Sangmu	Military service	
24 November 2009	MF	28	(South Korea) Kim Ju-Hwan	(South Korea) Gwangju Sangmu	Military service	
24 December 2009	MF	18	(South Korea) Lim Hyun-Woo		Contract expired	
24 December 2009	MF	19	(South Korea) Choi Jong-Hyuk		Contract expired	
24 December 2009	DF	28	(South Korea) Kim Myung-Ryong		Contract expired	
24 December 2009	GK	31	(South Korea) Cho Young-Joon		Contract expired	
24 December 2009	FW	32	(South Korea) Cha Jung-Min		Contract expired	
24 December 2009	DF	3	(South Korea) Choi Sang-Hyun		Released	
24 December 2009	MF	12	(South Korea) Jang Sang-Won		Released	
24 December 2009	MF	20	(South Korea) Yoon Seong-Min		Released	
24 December 2009	MF	14	(South Korea) Choi Jong-Bum	(South Korea) Pohang Steelers	Loan return	
24 December 2009	MF	4	(South Korea) Cho Han-Bum	(South Korea) Pohang Steelers	Loan return	
24 December 2009	MF	17	(South Korea) Han Jung-Hwa	(South Korea) Busan I'Park	Loan return	
24 December 2009	MF	7	(Brazil) Valdeir		Released	
1 February 2010	DF	5	(China) Feng Xiaoting	(South Korea) Jeonbuk Hyundai	Transferred	Naver

== Statistics ==
Updated to games played 7 November 2010.

No.	Nat.	Pos.	Player	Total		K-League		Korean FA Cup		K-League Cup	
No.	Nat.	Pos.	Player	Apps	Goals	Apps	Goals	Apps	Goals	Apps	Goals
1	GK		Jo Young-Jun	0	0	0	0	0	0	0	0
2	MF		Baek Young-Cheol	8	0	5	0	0	0	3	0
3	DF		Jeon Won-Keun	3	0	3	0	0	0	0	0
4	DF		Kim Hae-Won	1	0	1	0	0	0	0	0
5	MF		Kim Hyo-Seon	0	0	0	0	0	0	0	0
6	MF		Lee Seul-Ki	24	1	21	1	1	0	2	0
7	MF		Kim Min-Kyun	15	1	10	0	0	0	5	1
8	MF		Ahn Seong-Min	29	3	24	2	1	0	4	1
9	FW		Jang Nam-Seok	25	4	19	2	1	0	5	2
10	FW		Léo	23	5	21	5	1	0	1	0
11	FW		Hwang Il-Soo	31	4	25	2	1	0	5	2
12	FW		Anderson	12	2	8	2	1	0	3	0
13	FW		Cho Hyung-Ik	31	9	25	8	1	0	5	1
14	MF		Ohn Byung-Hoon	28	4	23	1	0	0	5	3
15	MF		Kim Oh-Sung	1	0	1	0	0	0	0	0
16	DF		Bang Dae-Jong	24	0	21	0	1	0	2	0
17	MF		Oh Joo-Hyun	19	0	14	0	0	0	5	0
18	MF		Choi Ho-Jeong	17	0	14	0	0	0	3	0
19	MF		Song Je-Heon	20	2	16	1	1	0	3	1
20	DF		Yang Seung-Won	17	0	16	0	1	0	0	0
21	GK		Baek Min-Cheol	34	-69	28	-57	1	-1	5	-11
22	MF		Kim Dae-Yeol	6	0	4	0	0	0	2	0
23	MF		Nam Hyun-Seong	0	0	0	0	0	0	0	0
24	DF		Park Jong-Jin	22	0	19	0	1	0	2	0
25	FW		Kim Hyun-Sung	10	1	9	1	0	0	1	0
26	DF		Lee Sang-Deok	27	1	21	1	1	0	5	0
27	MF		Lee Hyun-Chang	23	1	19	1	1	0	3	0
28	MF		Kim Chang-hee	0	0	0	0	0	0	0	0
29	GK		Cho Jun-Ho	0	0	0	0	0	0	0	0
30	DF		Jeong Hyung-Jun	0	0	0	0	0	0	0	0
31	GK		Park Jun-Oh	0	0	0	0	0	0	0	0
32	DF		Chong Woo-Sung	0	0	0	0	0	0	0	0
33	MF		Kim Dong-Suk	20	1	18	1	1	0	1	0
34	MF		Choi Deuk-Ha	0	0	0	0	0	0	0	0
35	MF		Lee Ki-Eun	0	0	0	0	0	0	0	0
36	MF		Kim Dong-Myong	0	0	0	0	0	0	0	0
37	MF		Yu Byeong-Uk	0	0	0	0	0	0	0	0
38	FW		Victor Isaac Acosta	3	0	3	0	0	0	0	0
43	MF		Kim Min-ho	2	0	2	0	0	0	0	0
55	DF		Hwang Sun-Pil	0	0	0	0	0	0	0	0

== Club ==
=== Coaching staff ===
Position	Staff
Manager (Head Coach)	(South Korea) Lee Young-jin
Coach	(South Korea) Dang Sung-Jeung
Coach	(South Korea) Son Hyun-Joon
Team Doctor	(South Korea) Kim Ki-Hyun
Team Doctor	(South Korea) Roh Hyun-Yuk

Source: Daegu FC

=== Managerial Changes ===
Outgoing manager	Date of vacancy	Table	Incoming manager	Date of appointment	Table
(South Korea) Byun Byung-Joo	7 December 2009	15th (2009)	(South Korea) Lee Young-jin	22 December 2009	15th (2010)

== Competitions ==
=== K-League ===
==== Matches ====
Match won	Match drawn	Match lost

Round	Date	Opponents	H / A	Score	Scorers	Attendance
1	27 February 2010	Gwangju Sangmu	H	1 – 2	Song Je-Heon 13'	3,532
2	6 March 2010	Pohang Steelers	A	2 – 1	Hwang Il-Soo 55'	11,737
3	14 March 2010	Chunnam Dragons	H	0 – 3		2,532
4	21 March 2010	Ulsan Hyundai	H	1 – 2	Cho Hyung-Ik 51'	3,532
5	28 March 2010	Daejeon Citizen	A	1 – 2	Anderson 62', Léo 74'	3,331
6	4 April 2010	Busan I'Park	A	0 – 2	Lee Hyun-Chang 34', Cho Hyung-Ik 46'	3,563
7	11 April 2010	FC Seoul	H	2 – 3	Ahn Seong-Min 35', Léo 58'	6,283
8	24 April 2010	Incheon United	A	1 – 1	Cho Hyung-Ik 47'	6,742
9	2 May 2010	Gangwon FC	H	2 – 2	Hwang Il-Soo 4', Anderson 71'	4,396
10	5 May 2010	Jeju United	A	1 – 0		4,561
11	10 July 2010	Jeonbuk Hyundai	A	4 – 0		12,658
12	18 July 2010	Suwon Bluewings	H	1 – 3	Cho Hyung-Ik 43'	2,737
13	25 July 2010	Gyeongnam FC	H	1 – 1	Kim Dong-Suk 53'	2,213
14	31 July 2010	Seongnam Ilhwa	A	1 – 3	Cho Hyung-Ik 58' 81', Jang Nam-Seok 65'	6,115
15	7 August 2010	Daejeon Citizen	H	1 – 3	Ahn Seong-Min 94'	3,711
16	15 August 2010	Pohang Steelers	H	0 – 2		2,552
17	21 August 2010	Suwon Bluewings	A	2 – 1	Lee Seul-Ki 17'	19,121
18	28 August 2010	Gangwon FC	A	1 – 0		10,263
19	4 September 2010	Seongnam Ilhwa	H	2 – 2	Jang Nam-Seok 57', Cho Hyung-Ik 71'	12,257
20	11 September 2010	FC Seoul	A	4 – 0		21,114
21	18 September 2010	Incheon United	H	1 – 4	Léo 47'	3,804
22	25 September 2010	Gyeongnam FC	A	1 – 0		10,875
23	3 October 2010	Busan I'Park	H	2 – 1	Kim Hyun-Sung 16', Cho Hyung-Ik 40'	15,201
24	16 October 2010	Gwangju Sangmu	A	0 – 3	Léo 25', 63', Lee Sang-Deok 77'	1,118
25	27 October 2010	Jeonbuk Hyundai	H	0 – 1		1,118
26	31 October 2010	Jeju United	H	0 – 3		3,713
27	3 November 2010	Ulsan Hyundai	A	5 – 0		5,565
28	7 November 2010	Chunnam Dragons	A	2 – 1	Hwang Il-Soo 11'	16,198

==== Standings ====
Pos	Team	Pld	W	D	L	GF	GA	GD	Pts
13	Daejeon Citizen	28	5	7	16	27	50	−23	22
14	Gwangju Sangmu	28	3	10	15	17	43	−26	19
15	Daegu FC	28	5	4	19	28	57	−29	19

Source: K League (in Korean)
Rules for classification: 1) Points; 2) Goal difference; 3) Goals scored

Pos	Team	Qualification
1	FC Seoul (C)	Qualification for the Champions League
2	Jeju United	Qualification for the Champions League
3	Jeonbuk Hyundai Motors	Qualification for the Champions League
4	Seongnam Ilhwa Chunma	
5	Ulsan Hyundai	
6	Gyeongnam FC	

Source: RSSSF
(C) Champions

==== Results summary ====
Overall								Home						Away					
Pld	W	D	L	GF	GA	GD	Pts	W	D	L	GF	GA	GD	W	D	L	GF	GA	GD
28	5	4	19	28	57	−29	19	1	3	10	14	32	−18	4	1	9	14	25	−11

Last updated: 2010-11-07.
Source: daegufc.co.kr (in Korean)

==== Results by round ====
Round	1	2	3	4	5	6	7	8	9	10	11	12	13	14	15	16	17	18	19	20	21	22	23	24	25	26	27	28
Ground	H	A	H	H	A	A	H	A	H	A	A	H	H	A	H	H	A	A	H	A	H	A	H	A	H	H	A	A
Result	L	L	L	L	W	W	L	D	D	L	L	L	D	W	L	L	L	L	D	L	L	L	W	W	L	L	L	L
Position	8	13	15	15	14	10	11	11	13	12	14	14	15	14	12	14	15	15	15	14	15	15	15	15	15	14	15	15

Source: kleaguei.com (in Korean)
A = Away; H = Home; W = Win; D = Draw; L = Loss

=== Korean FA Cup ===
==== Matches ====
Round	Date	Opponents	H / A	Score	Scorers
Round of 32	21 April 2010	Suwon City FC	A	1 – 0

=== K-League Cup ===
==== Matches ====
Round	Date	Opponents	H / A	Score	Scorers	Attendance
1	23 May 2010	Pohang Steelers	H	1 – 2	Jang Nam-Seok 56'	1,215
2	26 May 2010	Incheon United	A	3 – 2	Jang Nam-Seok 54', Hwang Il-Soo 74'	21,011
3	30 May 2010	Daejeon Citizen	H	3 – 2	Kim Min-Kyun 63', Song Je-Heon 65', Ohn Byung-Hoon 74'	2,162
4	6 June 2010	Busan I'Park	A	2 – 3	Cho Hyung-Ik 41', Ohn Byung-Hoon 46', Hwang Il-Soo 72'	2,950
Quarter-finals	14 July 2010	FC Seoul	A	2 – 2^{(a.e.t.); 3 PK 5}	Ohn Byung-Hoon 35', Ahn Seong-Min 73'	7,581

==== Standings ====
Pos	Team	Pld	W	D	L	GF	GA	GD	Pts	BIP	DGU	PHS	ICU	DJC
1	Busan IPark	4	3	0	1	9	5	+4	9	—	2–3	—	1–0	—
2	Daegu FC	4	2	0	2	9	9	0	6	—	—	1–2	—	3–2
3	Pohang Steelers	4	1	2	1	5	5	0	5	1–2	—	—	—	1–1
4	Incheon United	4	1	1	2	6	7	−1	4	—	3–2	1–1	—	—
5	Daejeon Citizen	4	1	1	2	7	10	−3	4	1–4	—	—	3–2	—

Source: RSSSF

== See also ==
- Daegu F.C.
