= 2010 Korean League Cup =

2010 POSCO Cup

Tournament details
- Country: South Korea
- Dates: 22 May – 25 August 2010
- Teams: 15

Final positions
- Champions: FC Seoul (2nd title)
- Runners-up: Jeonbuk Hyundai Motors

Tournament statistics
- Matches played: 37
- Goals scored: 123 (3.32 per match)
- Top goal scorer(s): Dejan Damjanović (6 goals)

The 2010 Korean League Cup, also known as the POSCO Cup 2010, was the 23rd competition of the Korean League Cup. It began on 22 May 2010, and ended on 25 August 2010.

The three matches of Gwangju Sangmu were revealed as fixed matches.

== Group stage ==
=== Allocation ===
The participating teams were assigned to one of three groups according to the 2009 K League table.

Group A	Group B	Group C
Jeonbuk Hyundai Motors (1); Jeonnam Dragons (4); Gyeongnam FC (7); Suwon Samsung Bluewings (10); Gangwon FC (13)	Seongnam Ilhwa Chunma (2); FC Seoul (5); Ulsan Hyundai (8); Gwangju Sangmu (11); Jeju United (14)	Pohang Steelers (3); Incheon United (6); Daejeon Citizen (9); Busan IPark (12); Daegu FC (15)

=== Group A ===
Pos	Team	Pld	W	D	L	GF	GA	GD	Pts	JHM	GNM	SSB	JND	GWN
1	Jeonbuk Hyundai Motors	4	3	1	0	10	4	+6	10	—	2–1	—	1–1	—
2	Gyeongnam FC	4	3	0	1	8	4	+4	9	—	—	4–1	1–0	—
3	Suwon Samsung Bluewings	4	2	0	2	7	9	−2	6	1–3	—	—	—	2–0
4	Jeonnam Dragons	4	1	1	2	6	5	+1	4	—	—	2–3	—	3–0
5	Gangwon FC	4	0	0	4	2	11	−9	0	1–4	1–2	—	—	—

Source: RSSSF

=== Group B ===
Pos	Team	Pld	W	D	L	GF	GA	GD	Pts	SEO	JJU	USH	SIC	GWJ
1	FC Seoul	4	2	2	0	8	2	+6	8	—	5–1	—	2–0	—
2	Jeju United	4	2	1	1	7	7	0	7	—	—	3–1	—	2–0
3	Ulsan Hyundai	4	1	2	1	7	7	0	5	1–1	—	—	—	2–0
4	Seongnam Ilhwa Chunma	4	0	3	1	5	7	−2	3	—	1–1	3–3	—	—
5	Gwangju Sangmu	4	0	2	2	1	5	−4	2	0–0	—	—	1–1	—

Source: RSSSF

=== Group C ===
Pos	Team	Pld	W	D	L	GF	GA	GD	Pts	BIP	DGU	PHS	ICU	DJC
1	Busan IPark	4	3	0	1	9	5	+4	9	—	2–3	—	1–0	—
2	Daegu FC	4	2	0	2	9	9	0	6	—	—	1–2	—	3–2
3	Pohang Steelers	4	1	2	1	5	5	0	5	1–2	—	—	—	1–1
4	Incheon United	4	1	1	2	6	7	−1	4	—	3–2	1–1	—	—
5	Daejeon Citizen	4	1	1	2	7	10	−3	4	1–4	—	—	3–2	—

Source: RSSSF

=== Ranking of third-placed teams ===
Pos	Grp	Team	Pld	W	D	L	GF	GA	GD	Pts
1	A	Suwon Samsung Bluewings	4	2	0	2	7	9	−2	6
2	B	Ulsan Hyundai	4	1	2	1	7	7	0	5
3	C	Pohang Steelers	4	1	2	1	5	5	0	5

Source: RSSSF

== Knockout stage ==
=== Bracket ===
Quarter-finals
A1	Jeonbuk Hyundai Motors	2
B3	Ulsan Hyundai	0
A2	Gyeongnam FC (p)	1 (4)
B2	Jeju United	1 (3)
B1	FC Seoul (p)	2 (5)
C2	Daegu FC	2 (3)
C1	Busan IPark	3 (5)
A3	Suwon Samsung Bluewings (p)	3 (6)

Semi-finals
Jeonbuk Hyundai Motors	2
Gyeongnam FC	1
FC Seoul (a.e.t.)	4
Suwon Samsung Bluewings	2

Final
Jeonbuk Hyundai Motors	0
FC Seoul	3

=== Quarter-finals ===
14 July 2010
19:00 KST

Jeonbuk Hyundai Motors	2–0	Ulsan Hyundai
Kim Ji-woong 7'; Kim Seung-yong 34'

Jeonju World Cup Stadium, Jeonju
Attendance: 6,980

14 July 2010
19:00 KST

Gyeongnam FC	1–1 (a.e.t.)	Jeju United
Lúcio 90'		Kim Eun-jung 29'
Penalties
Kim Dong-chan (penalty missed); Lee Hun (penalty scored); Lee Yong-rae (penalty scored); Kim In-han (penalty scored); Lúcio (penalty scored)	4–3	(penalty missed) Kim Eun-jung; (penalty scored) Lee Sang-hyup; (penalty missed) Cho Yong-hyung; (penalty scored) Han Jae-man; (penalty scored) Hong Jeong-ho

Changwon Football Center, Changwon
Attendance: 5,106

14 July 2010
19:00 KST

Busan IPark	3–3 (a.e.t.)	Suwon Samsung Bluewings
Park Hee-do 16', 57'; Yoo Ho-joon 94'		Ha Tae-goon 23'; Kim Do-heon 64'; José Mota 103'
Penalties
Jeong Shung-hoon (penalty scored); Kim Hyo-il (penalty scored); Kim Geun-chol (penalty missed); Park Hee-do (penalty scored); Kim Sang-rok (penalty scored); Kim Jong-hoon (penalty scored); Lee Jung-ho (penalty missed)	5–6	(penalty scored) Yeom Ki-hun; (penalty scored) José Mota; (penalty missed) Baek Ji-hoon; (penalty scored) Cho Won-hee; (penalty scored) Kim Dae-eui; (penalty scored) Kwak Hee-ju; (penalty scored) Choi Sung-hwan

Busan Asiad Stadium, Busan
Attendance: 3,127

14 July 2010
20:00 KST

FC Seoul	2–2 (a.e.t.)	Daegu FC
Adilson 22'; Ha Dae-sung 28'		On Byung-hoon 36'; An Sung-min 73'
Penalties
Hyun Young-min (penalty scored); Jung Jo-gook (penalty scored); Kim Jin-kyu (penalty scored); Koh Myong-jin (penalty scored); Damjanović (penalty scored)	5–3	(penalty missed) Anderson; (penalty scored) Lee Sang-duk; (penalty scored) Lee Hyun-chang; (penalty scored) Cho Hyung-ik

Seoul World Cup Stadium, Seoul
Attendance: 7,581

=== Semi-finals ===
28 July 2010
19:00 KST

Jeonbuk Hyundai Motors	2–1	Gyeongnam FC
Lee Dong-gook 18'; Luiz Henrique 38'		Sim Woo-yeon 81' (o.g.)

Jeonju World Cup Stadium, Jeonju
Attendance: 7,267

28 July 2010
20:00 KST

FC Seoul	4–2 (a.e.t.)	Suwon Samsung Bluewings
Damjanović 57', 110'; Lee Seung-ryul 82', 115'		Kim Jin-kyu 62' (o.g.); Yeom Ki-hun 72'

Seoul World Cup Stadium, Seoul
Attendance: 21,036

=== Final ===
25 August 2010
19:00 KST

Jeonbuk Hyundai Motors	0–3	FC Seoul
		Damjanović 47'; Jung Jo-gook 55'; Lee Seung-ryul 90+1'

Jeonju World Cup Stadium, Jeonju
Attendance: 15,891

== Top scorers ==
Rank	Player	Club	Goals
1	(Montenegro) Dejan Damjanović	FC Seoul	6
2	(South Korea) Jeong Shung-hoon	Busan IPark	4
2	(South Korea) Lee Jun-young	Incheon United	4
2	(South Korea) Kim Eun-jung	Jeju United	4
2	(Croatia) Krunoslav Lovrek	Jeonbuk Hyundai Motors	4
2	(Brazil) José Mota	Suwon Samsung Bluewings	4
6	(South Korea) On Byung-hoon	Daegu FC	3
6	(South Korea) Park Sung-ho	Daejeon Citizen	3
6	(South Korea) Yoon Bit-garam	Gyeongnam FC	3
6	(South Korea) Ha Dae-sung	FC Seoul	3
6	(South Korea) Lee Seung-ryul	FC Seoul	3
6	(Brazil) Mota	Pohang Steelers	3
6	(South Korea) Kim Shin-wook	Ulsan Hyundai	3

== Awards ==
Award	Player	Team	Points
Top goalscorer	(Montenegro) Dejan Damjanović	FC Seoul	6 goals
Top assist provider	(South Korea) Jang Nam-seok	Daegu FC	4 assists

== See also ==
- 2010 in South Korean football
- 2010 K League
- 2010 Korean FA Cup
- 2011 South Korean football match-fixing scandal
