= Young-hoon =

- Hangul: 영훈
- RR: Yeonghun
- MR: Yŏnghun
- IPA: [jʌŋβun]

Young-hoon (영훈), also spelled Young-hun or Yeong-hun, is a Korean given name.

People with this name include:

== Entertainers ==
- Joo Young-hoon (born 1969), South Korean singer, songwriter, and television personality
- Kim Young-hoon (born 1978), South Korean actor
- Lee Yeong-hoon (born 1982), South Korean actor

== Sportspeople ==
- Choi Young-hoon (born 1981), South Korean football player
- Cho Young-hun (born 1982), South Korean former first baseman
- Cho Young-hoon (born 1989), South Korean football player

== Other ==
- Kang Young-hoon (born 1922), South Korean politician
- Lee Young-hoon (born 1951), South Korean economist
- Ko Young-hoon (born 1952), South Korean painter
- Young Hoon Lee (pastor) (born 1954), South Korean pastor
- Lee Young-hoon (composer) (1960–2008), South Korean composer
- Park Yeong-hun (born 1985), South Korean professional Go player

== See also ==
- List of Korean given names
