= Park Jong-jin =

- Hangul: 박종진
- RR: Bak Jongjin
- MR: Pak Chongjin

Park Jong-jin is a Korean name consisting of the family name Park and the given name Jong-jin. It may refer to:

- Park Jong-jin (footballer, born 1980)
- Park Jong-jin (footballer, born 1987)
