= Park Su-chang =

South Korean professional footballer

Park Su-Chang
Personal information
- Full name: Park Su-Chang
- Date of birth: 20 June 1989 (age 37)
- Place of birth: South Korea
- Height: 1.75 m (5 ft 9 in)
- Position: Midfielder

Team information
- Current team: Gimpo Citizen FC
- Number: 29

Youth career
- Kyung Hee University

Senior career*
Years	Team	Apps	(Gls)
2012	Daegu FC	1	(0)
2013	Chungju Hummel	29	(0)
2014–2017	Jeju United	41	(9)
2016–2017	→ Sangju Sangmu (army)	23	(0)
2018–2019	Daejeon Citizen	39	(2)
2020	Gimhae FC	0	(0)
2020–	Gimpo Citizen FC	12	(1)
- * Club domestic league appearances and goals as of 22 January 2021

- Park Su-chang
- Hangul: 박수창
- Hanja: 朴壽昶
- RR: Bak Suchang
- MR: Pak Such'ang

Park Su-Chang (Korean: 박수창; born 20 June 1989) is a South Korean footballer who plays as a midfielder for Gimpo Citizen FC in the K3 League, the third tier of professional football in South Korea. He has previously played for K League 1 clubs Daegu FC, Jeju United and Sangju Sangmu.

== Club career ==
Born on 20 June 1989, Park was a draftee pick for Daegu FC from Kyung Hee University for the 2012 season. He made his professional debut on 19 May 2012, coming on as a substitute in a home game against Daejeon Citizen in the K League, the top tier of football in South Korea. For 2013, he switched to the second division K League Challenge, playing for Chungju Hummel, before returning to top tier football the following year with Jeju United, with which he played for two seasons. A two-year period at Sangju Sangmu FC followed. He later played for Daejeon Citizen FC in the K League 2 from 2018 to 2019 before transferring to Gimhae FC, a club participating in the K3 League, the third tier of professional football in South Korea. He switched mid-season to Gimpo Citizen FC, also in the K3 League.

== Club career statistics ==
As of 22 January 2021

Club performance			League		Cup		League Cup		Total	
Season	Club	League	Apps	Goals	Apps	Goals	Apps	Goals	Apps	Goals
South Korea			League		KFA Cup		League Cup		Total	
2012	Daegu FC	K League 1	1	0	0	0	-		1	0
2013	Chungju Hummel	K League 2	29	0	2	0	-		31	0
2014	Jeju United	K League 1	21	6	1	1	-		22	7
2015	Jeju United	K League 1	20	3	2	0	-		22	3
2016	Sangju Sangmu FC	K League 1	14	0	1	0	-		15	0
2017	Sangju Sangmu FC	K League 1	9	0	2	2	-		11	2
2018	Daejeon Citizen FC	K League 2	13	2	1	0	-		14	2
2019	Daejeon Citizen FC	K League 2	26	0	1	0	-		27	0
2020	Gimhae FC	K3 League	0	0	0	0	-		0	0
2020	Gimpo Citizen FC	K3 League	12	1	0	0	-		12	1
Career total			145	12	10	3	-		155	15
