= Kim Kyo-bin =

South Korean footballer (born 1987)

Kim Kyo-Bin
Personal information
- Full name: Kim Kyo-Bin
- Date of birth: 29 December 1987 (age 38)
- Place of birth: South Korea
- Height: 1.93 m (6 ft 4 in)
- Position: Goalkeeper

Youth career
- Kwangwoon University

Senior career*
| Years | Team | Apps | (Gls) |
| 2010–2011 | Chunnam Dragons | 0 | (0) |
| 2012 | Daegu FC | 3 | (0) |
| 2013 | Incheon United | 0 | (0) |
| 2014–2015 | Gyeongnam FC | 1 | (0) |
| 2016 | Incheon United | 1 | (0) |
| 2016 | Jeonnam Dragons | 1 | (0) |
| 2017 | Pohang Steelers | 0 | (0) |
- * Club domestic league appearances and goals as of 2 December 2016

Kim Kyo-Bin (Korean: 김교빈; born 29 December 1987) is a retired South Korean footballer who played as a goalkeeper.

He previously played for both Jeonnam Dragons and Daegu FC both in the K-League. In 2013, he joined Incheon United in the K League Classic.
