= Moacir Pereira =

Brazilian football coach (born 1960)

Personal information
- Full name: Moacir Pereira
- Date of birth: 1 January 1960 (age 66)
- Place of birth: Nova Lima (MG), Brazil

Managerial career
- Years: Team
- 1995–1997: Vila Nova (assistant)
- 1997–1998: Vila Nova
- 2002–2004: Cruzeiro (assistant)
- 2005–2006: Ipatinga (assistant)
- 2006–2007: Flamengo (assistant)
- 2007–2008: Atlético Paranaense (assistant)
- 2008–2009: Botafogo (assistant)
- 2009–2010: Coritiba (assistant)
- 2010–2011: Brazil U-20 (assistant)
- 2011: Brazil U-23 (assistant)
- 2012: Daegu
- 2014: CSE
- ‡ National team caps and goals as of 15 August 2011

Moacir Pereira (born 1 January 1960 in Nova Lima) is a Brazilian football coach.

== Coaching career ==
He previously managed South Korean side Daegu FC and CSE, a Brazilian football club based in Palmeira dos Índios, Alagoas state.
