= Kim Min-koo =

South Korean footballer (born 1984)

Kim Min-Koo
Personal information
- Full name: Kim Min-Koo
- Date of birth: 7 May 1984 (age 42)
- Place of birth: South Korea
- Height: 1.84 m (6 ft 1/2 in)
- Position: Forward

Youth career
- Daegu University

Senior career*
Years	Team	Apps	(Gls)
2008–2010	Gangneung City	16	(12)
2009–2010	→ Police (army)		
2011–2012	Daegu FC	21	(1)
2012	Daejeon KHNP	12	(2)
- * Club domestic league appearances and goals as of 2 April 2011

- Kim Min-koo
- Hangul: 김민구
- Hanja: 金玟究
- RR: Gim Mingu
- MR: Kim Min'gu

Kim Min-Koo (Korean: 김민구; born 7 May 1984) is a South Korean footballer who plays as a forward.

== Club career ==
Spending his youth career at Daegu University, Kim started his senior football career with National League side Gangneung City in 2008. During his time with Gangneung, Kim appeared in 16 league matches, scoring 12 goals. In 2009, he joined the Police FC to comply with his compulsory two-year military service.

Having completed his military service obligations, Kim was drafted in the extra pick of the 2011 K-League Draft by Daegu FC. He made his Daegu FC debut in a 0–2 League Cup loss to Gyeongnam FC on 16 March 2011, coming on as a substitute for Lee Hyung-Sang. Kim then made his K-League debut the following week in a 1–1 draw against Incheon United on 20 March 2011, again as a substitute.

== Club career statistics ==
As of 2 April 2012

Club performance			League		Cup		League Cup		Total	
Season	Club	League	Apps	Goals	Apps	Goals	Apps	Goals	Apps	Goals
South Korea			League		KFA Cup		League Cup		Total	
2008	Gangneung City	National League	14	11	1	0	-		15	11
2010	Gangneung City	National League	2	1	0	0	-		2	1
2011	Daegu FC	K-League	21	1	0	0	1	0	22	1
Career total			37	13	0	0	1	0	38	13
