= Lee Haeng-su =

South Korean footballer

Lee Haeng-Su
Personal information
- Full name: Lee Haeng-Su
- Date of birth: 27 August 1990 (age 36)
- Place of birth: South Korea
- Height: 1.82 m (5 ft 11 1/2 in)
- Position: Forward

Team information
- Current team: Siheung City

Senior career*
Years	Team	Apps	(Gls)
2012	Daegu FC	6	(0)
2013–2015	Gangneung City	53	(11)
2016	Yangju Citizen		
2017–	Siheung City	13	(13)
- * Club domestic league appearances and goals as of 1 January 2016

Lee Haeng-Su (Korean: 이행수; born 27 August 1990) is a South Korean footballer who plays as a forward for Siheung City in the K3 League.
