= Hwang Soon-min =

South Korean footballer

Personal information
- Full name: Hwang Soon-min
- Date of birth: 14 September 1990 (age 36)
- Place of birth: South Korea
- Height: 1.77 m (5 ft 9 1/2 in)
- Positions: Midfielder; left-back

Team information
- Current team: Suwon FC
- Number: 20

Youth career
- 2003–2005: Dongbuk Middle School
- 2006: Janghoon High School
- 2007–2008: Kamimura Gakuen High School

Senior career*
| Years | Team | Apps | (Gls) |
| 2009–2010 | Mokpo City | 23 | (0) |
| 2011 | Shonan Bellmare | 5 | (0) |
| 2012–2021 | Daegu FC | 215 | (16) |
| 2016–2017 | → Sangju Sangmu (army) | 16 | (1) |
| 2022– | Suwon FC | 17 | (0) |

International career
| 2010 | South Korea U-23 | | |
- * Club domestic league appearances and goals as of 7 August 2022

Hwang Soon-min (Korean: 황순민; Hanja: 黄順旻; born 14 September 1990) is a South Korean footballer who plays for Suwon FC.
