= Cho Young-hoon =

South Korean footballer

Personal information
- Full name: Cho Young-hoon
- Date of birth: 13 April 1989 (age 37)
- Place of birth: South Korea
- Height: 1.76 m (5 ft 9 1/2 in)
- Position: Defender

Team information
- Current team: FC Anyang
- Number: 13

Youth career
- Dongguk University

Senior career*
Years	Team	Apps	(Gls)
2012–2016	Daegu FC	73	(2)
2017–	FC Anyang	7	(0)
- * Club domestic league appearances and goals as of 1 January 2018

Cho Young-hoon (Korean: 조영훈; born 13 April 1989) is a South Korean footballer who plays as a defender for FC Anyang in the K League 2.

== Club career statistics ==
As of 16 December 2013

Club performance			League		Cup		League Cup		Total	
Season	Club	League	Apps	Goals	Apps	Goals	Apps	Goals	Apps	Goals
South Korea			League		KFA Cup		League Cup		Total	
2012	Daegu FC	K-League	26	1	0	0	-		26	1
2013	Daegu FC	K-League Classic	10	0	0	0	-		10	0
Career total			36	1	0	0	0	0	36	1
