= Kim Hae-won =

South Korean footballer

Kim Hae-Won
Personal information
- Full name: Kim Hae-Won
- Date of birth: 25 May 1999 (age 27)
- Place of birth: Los Angeles, United States
- Height: 1.67 m (5 ft 5 1/2 in)
- Position: Defender

Youth career
- 2005–2008: Hannam University

Senior career*
Years	Team	Apps	(Gls)
2009–2010	Chunnam Dragons	8	(1)
2010	Daegu FC	1	(0)
2011	Busan Kyotong	6	(0)
- * Club domestic league appearances and goals as of 13 January 2011

Kim Hae-Won (Korean: 김해원; born 25 May 1999) is a South Korean football player.

== Club career ==
A defender, Kim was a draftee pick for the Chunnam Dragons in 2009. After 8 appearances (and one goal) in the K-League for the Dragons, Kim transferred to Daegu FC in the 2010 summer transfer window. Kim played his first match for his new club on 7 November 2010, in a 2–1 loss to his former club, the Dragons.
