= Lee Joon-hee =

South Korean footballer

Lee June-hee
Personal information
- Full name: Lee June-hee
- Date of birth: 1 June 1988 (age 38)
- Place of birth: South Korea
- Height: 1.82 m (5 ft 11 1/2 in)
- Position: Midfielder

Team information
- Current team: Ansan Greeners
- Number: 22

Youth career
- 2007–2010: Kyunghee University

Senior career*
Years	Team	Apps	(Gls)
2011–2015	Daegu FC	108	(8)
2016	Gyeongnam FC	10	(3)
2017	Seoul E-Land	5	(2)
2017	Busan IPark	4	(2)
2019–	Ansan Greeners	11	(0)
- * Club domestic league appearances and goals as of 16 November 2019

Lee June-hee (Korean: 이준희; born 1 June 1988) is a South Korean footballer who plays for Ansan Greeners as a midfielder.
