= Ahn Jae-hoon =

South Korean footballer

Personal information
- Full name: Ahn Jae-hoon
- Date of birth: 1 February 1988 (age 38)
- Place of birth: Pohang, South Korea
- Height: 1.87 m (6 ft 1 1/2 in)
- Position: Defender

Team information
- Current team: Busan Transportation Corporation FC
- Number: 29

Youth career
- 2007–2010: Konkuk University

Senior career*
Years	Team	Apps	(Gls)
2011–2015	Daegu FC	35	(1)
2013	→ Suwon FC (loan)	16	(0)
2014–2015	→ Sangju Sangmu (army)	30	(1)
2016	Osotspa Samut Prakan F.C.	5	(1)
2016	Cheonan City	9	(0)
2017	Suwon FC	5	(0)
2017	→ Seoul E-Land (loan)	9	(0)
2018	Cheonan City	17	(3)
2020–	Busan TC	71	(1)
- * Club domestic league appearances and goals as of 20 October 2022

- Ahn Jae-hoon
- Hangul: 안재훈
- Hanja: 安在勳
- RR: An Jaehun
- MR: An Chaehun

Ahn Jae-hoon (Korean: 안재훈; born 1 February 1988) is a South Korean footballer who plays for Busan Transportation Corporation FC.

== Club career ==
Ahn played in the University League when studying at Konkuk University from 2007 to 2010. Entering the 2011 K-League Draft, Ahn was drafted in the first round by Daegu FC. He made his professional debut in a 0–2 League Cup loss to Gyeongnam FC on 16 March 2011, and debuted in the K-League the following week.
