= Lee Ji-nam =

South Korean footballer (born 1984)

Personal information
- Full name: Lee Ji-nam
- Date of birth: 21 November 1984 (age 41)
- Place of birth: Jeonju, Jeollabuk-do, South Korea
- Height: 1.83 m (6 ft 0 in)
- Positions: Centre back; defensive midfielder

Team information
- Current team: Jeonnam Dragons
- Number: 17

Senior career*
| Years | Team | Apps | (Gls) |
| 2002–2007 | Anyang LG Cheetahs / FC Seoul | 0 | (0) |
| 2006–2007 | → Police FC | ? | (?) |
| 2008–2010 | Gyeongnam FC | 32 | (2) |
| 2011–2013 | Daegu FC | 86 | (7) |
| 2014 | Henan Jianye | 22 | (1) |
| 2015–2019 | Jeonnam Dragons | 103 | (4) |
| Total | | 243 | (14) |

International career
| 2014 | South Korea | 0 | (0) |
- * Club domestic league appearances and goals

- Lee Ji-nam
- Hangul: 이지남
- Hanja: 李指南
- RR: I Jinam
- MR: I Chinam

Lee Ji-nam (Korean: 이지남; born 21 November 1984) is a South Korean former football player.

== Club career ==
=== FC Seoul ===
He appeared in 4 matches only at League Cup in 2004. He played for Police FC while on military service.

=== Daegu FC ===
On 4 January 2011, Lee signed for Daegu FC. Lee made his debut for Daegu FC on 5 March 2011, playing the full 90 minutes in Daegu's opening game of the 2011 K-League season loss 2–3 against Gwangju FC. He scored his Daegu FC first goal against Incheon United on 20 March 2011. In his next game, Lee scored his second Daegu goal in a 1–0 win against Chunnam Dragons.

=== Henan Jianye ===
On 6 February 2014, Lee transferred to Henan Jianye.

=== Jeonman Dragons ===
On 4 January 2015, Lee transferred to Jeonnam Dragons.

== Career statistics ==
Appearances and goals by club, season and competition
| Club | Season | League | | | Cup | | League Cup | | Total | |
| Club | Season | Division | Apps | Goals | Apps | Goals | Apps | Goals | Apps | Goals |
|---|---|---|---|---|---|---|---|---|---|---|
| Gyeongnam FC | 2008 | K League 1 | 5 | 1 | 2 | 0 | 3 | 0 | 10 | 1 |
| Gyeongnam FC | 2009 | K League 1 | 7 | 0 | 0 | 0 | 0 | 0 | 7 | 0 |
| Gyeongnam FC | 2010 | K League 1 | 20 | 1 | 0 | 0 | 3 | 0 | 23 | 1 |
| Gyeongnam FC | Total | | 32 | 2 | 2 | 0 | 6 | 0 | 40 | 2 |
| Daegu FC | 2011 | K League 1 | 26 | 2 | 0 | 0 | 2 | 0 | 28 | 2 |
| Daegu FC | 2012 | K League 1 | 32 | 3 | 2 | 0 | — | | 34 | 3 |
| Daegu FC | 2013 | K League 1 | 28 | 2 | 0 | 0 | — | | 28 | 2 |
| Daegu FC | Total | | 86 | 7 | 2 | 0 | 2 | 0 | 90 | 7 |
| Henan Jianye | 2014 | Chinese Super League | 22 | 1 | 2 | 0 | — | | 24 | 1 |
| Jeonnam Dragons | 2015 | K League 1 | 19 | 0 | 4 | 0 | — | | 23 | 0 |
| Jeonnam Dragons | 2016 | K League 1 | 30 | 0 | 3 | 0 | — | | 33 | 0 |
| Jeonnam Dragons | 2017 | K League 1 | 20 | 1 | 0 | 0 | — | | 4 | 0 |
| Jeonnam Dragons | 2018 | K League 1 | 18 | 3 | 1 | 0 | — | | 19 | 3 |
| Jeonnam Dragons | 2019 | K League 2 | 16 | 1 | 0 | 0 | — | | 10 | 0 |
| Jeonnam Dragons | Total | | 103 | 4 | 8 | 0 | — | | 111 | 4 |
| Career total | | | 243 | 14 | 14 | 0 | 8 | 0 | 265 | 14 |
