= Lee Yang-jong =

Footballer

Personal information
- Full name: Lee Yang-jong
- Date of birth: 17 July 1989 (age 37)
- Place of birth: South Korea
- Height: 1.84 m (6 ft 1/2 in)
- Position: Goalkeeper

Team information
- Current team: Gangneung City
- Number: 21

Youth career
- 2007–2010: Kwandong University

Senior career*
Years	Team	Apps	(Gls)
2011–2017	Daegu FC	51	(0)
2018–	Gangneung City	3	(0)
- * Club domestic league appearances and goals as of 2 May 2018

Lee Yang-jong (Korean: 이양종; born 17 July 1989) is a South Korean football goalkeeper, who plays for Gangneung City in the Korea National League.

== Club career ==
Lee, a draftee from the 2011 K League draft intake, was selected by Daegu FC for the 2011 K-League season. Although not the first choice keeper, Daegu FC manager Lee Young-jin gave Lee his professional debut before a home crowd in a match against Seongnam Ilhwa Chunma on 25 June 2011, during which Lee conceded a goal as well as earning a yellow card.

== Club career statistics ==
As of 27 November 2014

Club performance			League		Cup		League Cup		Total	
Season	Club	League	Apps	Goals	Apps	Goals	Apps	Goals	Apps	Goals
South Korea			League		KFA Cup		League Cup		Total	
2011	Daegu FC	K League 1	1	0	0	0	0	0	1	0
2012	Daegu FC	K League 1	2	0	0	0	-		2	0
2013	Daegu FC	K League 1	24	0	0	0	-		24	0
2014	Daegu FC	K League 2	19	0	0	0	-		19	0
Career total			46	0	0	0	0	0	46	0
