= Yoo Kyoung-youl =

South Korean footballer (born 1978)

Yoo Kyoung-Youl
Personal information
- Full name: Yoo Kyoung-Youl
- Date of birth: 15 August 1978 (age 48)
- Place of birth: South Korea
- Height: 1.84 m (6 ft 0 in)
- Position: Defender

Team information
- Current team: Cheonan City

Youth career
- 1997–2000: Dankook University

Senior career*
Years	Team	Apps	(Gls)
2001–2002	Sangmu		
2003–2010	Ulsan Hyundai	194	(10)
2011–2013	Daegu FC	68	(4)
2014–2015	Cheonan City	11	(1)

International career
1999	South Korea U-23	1	(0)
2004–2006	South Korea	17	(0)
- * Club domestic league appearances and goals as of 16 December 2013

- Yoo Kyoung-youl
- Hangul: 유경렬
- Hanja: 柳俓烈
- RR: Yu Gyeongryeol
- MR: Yu Kyŏngnyŏl

Yoo Kyoung-Youl (born 15 August 1978) is a former South Korean footballer who last played for Cheonan City in the Korea National League.

== Club career ==
On 28 February 2011, Yoo signed a two-year contract with Daegu FC. The following year, he became the club's captain.

== International career ==
Sporting positions
Preceded by Back Min-Chul	Daegu FC captain 2012–2013	Succeeded by
