= Juninho (footballer, born 1983) =

Brazilian footballer

Personal information
- Full name: Júnio César Arcanjo
- Date of birth: 11 January 1983 (age 43)
- Place of birth: Nova Lima, Brazil
- Height: 1.76 m (5 ft 9 in)
- Position: Attacking midfielder

Team information
- Current team: Moto Club

Youth career
- 2000–2001: Atlético Mineiro

Senior career*
Years	Team	Apps	(Gls)
2002–2007	Atlético Mineiro	59	(4)
2005–2006	→ Fluminense (loan)	30	(1)
2007–2012	Nacional Madeira	35	(3)
2009–2010	→ Bahia (loan)	15	(0)
2011	→ Daegu FC (loan)	15	(2)
2013	Rio Branco-SP	11	(2)
2013	Guaratinguetá	24	(3)
2014	Anápolis	5	(0)
2015	Parauapebas		
2015	Remo	9	(0)
2016	Tricordiano	10	(2)
2016	Macaé	14	(2)
2017	Uberlândia	4	(0)
2018	Patrocinense	12	(0)
2018	ASA	3	(0)
2019	Moto Club		
2019	Ferroviário	8	(1)
2020	Parnahyba	8	(4)
2020	Maranhão		
2020–2021	Altos	44	(5)
2021–2022	River	13	(3)
2022	Mamoré		
2023–	Moto Club	0	(0)

International career
2003	Brazil U-20	6	(1)
- * Club domestic league appearances and goals as of 5 January 2023

Júnio César Arcanjo (born 11 January 1983), commonly known as Juninho, is a Brazilian footballer who plays as an attacking midfielder for Moto Club.

== Club career ==
On 25 February 2011, Juninho signed for South Korean club Daegu FC on a one-year loan. Juninho made his Daegu FC debut on 5 March against Gwangju FC at Guus Hiddink Stadium in a 2–3 loss.

== Honours ==
Brazil

- FIFA U-20 World Cup: 2003

Fluminense

- Campeonato Carioca: 2005
- Taça Rio: 2005

Atlético Mineiro

- Campeonato Mineiro: 2007
