= Isaac Acosta =

Argentine footballer

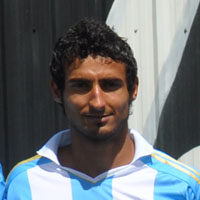

Personal information
- Full name: Victor Isaac Acosta
- Date of birth: 4 December 1986 (age 39)
- Place of birth: Argentina
- Height: 1.87 m (6 ft 2 in)
- Position: Forward

Youth career
- 2001–2005: Velez Sarsfield

Senior career*
Years	Team	Apps	(Gls)
2005–2006	El Porvenir	3	(0)
2006–2007	Rubio Ñú		
2007–2008	Atlético Tucumán		
2008–2010	Unión de Tres Lomas		
2010	Daegu FC	3	(0)
2012–2014	Nueva Chicago	31	(6)
2014–2015	UAI Urquiza	33	(4)
2016	Concepción	11	(1)
2016–2017	Deportivo Armenio	28	(10)
2017–2018	Defensores Unidos	12	(1)
2019	Sacachispas	7	(0)
- * Club domestic league appearances and goals

Victor Isaac Acosta (born 4 December 1986) is an Argentine footballer.

== Club career ==
Acosta is a product of the youth system of Buenos Aires club Velez Sarsfield. In 2005, Acosta moved to Primera B club El Porvenir, but was unable to prevent the club from being relegated to the third tier of Argentine football, the Primera B Metropolitana. For the 2006–2007 season, he moved to Paraguayan club Rubio Ñú, playing in the Segunda División, the second division of Paraguayan football. A return to Argentina followed, and Acosta was on the roster of another Primera B club Atlético Tucumán for the 2007–2008 season. After the conclusion of the 2007–2008 season, a two-year spell at Unión Deportiva Tres Lomas ensued. His time at Union Deportiva was interrupted in August 2009, when Acosta trialled with Notts County under the supervision of Sven-Göran Eriksson. The trial ultimately proved unsuccessful, and Acosta returned to Unión Deportiva Tres Lomas.

In July 2010, Acosta signed a one-year contract which would take him offshore to the K-League, as a summer transfer for Daegu FC. He made his debut as a substitute in a 2 – 0 loss against the Pohang Steelers, and made a further substitute appearance the following week. Acosta was a starter for the match against Seongnam Ilhwa on 4 September 2010.

In February 2011, the forward was released by Daegu and returned to Argentina. He signed in January 2012 to play for Club Atlético Nueva Chicago.

== K League career statistics ==
As of 26 September 2010

Club performance			League		Cup		League Cup		Total	
Season	Club	League	Apps	Goals	Apps	Goals	Apps	Goals	Apps	Goals
South Korea			League		KFA Cup		League Cup		Total	
2010	Daegu FC	K-League	3	0	0	0	0	0	3	0
Career total			3	0	0	0	0	0	3	0
