= Oh Ju-hyun =

South Korean footballer (born 1987)

Personal information
- Full name: Oh Ju-hyun
- Date of birth: 2 April 1987 (age 39)
- Place of birth: Seogwipo, Jeju-do, South Korea
- Height: 1.72 m (5 ft 7 1/2 in)
- Position: Midfielder

Youth career
- 2006–2009: Korea University

Senior career*
Years	Team	Apps	(Gls)
2010–2011	Daegu FC	15	(0)
2013–2014	Jeju United	20	(0)
2015	Hwaseong FC		
2016	Daejeon Korail FC	8	(0)
- * Club domestic league appearances and goals as of 19 March 2019

- Oh Ju-hyun
- Hangul: 오주현
- Hanja: 吳周炫
- RR: O Juhyeon
- MR: O Chuhyŏn

Oh Ju-Hyun (Korean: 오주현; born 2 April 1987) is a South Korean former professional football player. He was a midfielder for Daegu FC in the K-League before being implicated in the 2011 South Korean football betting scandal. He later played for another K-League club, Jeju United, before playing for lower league clubs.

== Club career ==
Born on 2 April 1987, Oh was a draftee from the 2010 K-League draft intake, and joined Daegu FC for the 2010 season. He earned a yellow card in his debut match, a loss in a K-League against the Gwangju Sangmu on 27 February 2010, and followed this up with a red card in his following game, his debut in the K-League (a loss to Jeju United). Despite this intemperate start to his professional footballing career, he established himself as a regular in the first team squad.

Remaining with Daegu for the following season, Oh was implicated in the betting scandal that was discovered in June 2011. Indicted for his involvement in match-fixing he was released by the club. In March 2013, he joined K League Classic team Jeju United. He played several games that year, but was unused for the 2014 season.

Oh transferred to K3 League club Hwaseong FC for 2015. The next year, he played in the Korea National League for Daejeon Korail FC.

== Club career statistics ==
As of 19 March 2019

Club performance			League		Cup		League Cup		Total	
Season	Club	League	Apps	Goals	Apps	Goals	Apps	Goals	Apps	Goals
South Korea			League		KFA Cup		League Cup		Total	
2010	Daegu F.C.	K-League	14	0	0	0	5	0	19	0
2011	Daegu F.C.	K-League	1	0	0	0	3	0	4	0
2013	Jeju United	K-League Classic	18	0	2	0	-		20	0
2014	Jeju United	K-League Classic	0	0	0	0	-		0	0
2015	Hwaseong FC	K3 League	0	0	1	0	-		1	0
2016	Daejeon Korail FC	Korea National League	8	0	0	0	-		8	0
Career total			41	0	3	0	8	0	52	0
