= Kim You-sung =

South Korean footballer

Kim You-Sung
Personal information
- Full name: Kim You-Sung
- Date of birth: 4 December 1988 (age 37)
- Place of birth: South Korea
- Height: 1.83 m (6 ft 0 in)
- Position: Midfielder

Team information
- Current team: Goyang Hi FC
- Number: 24

Youth career
- 2007–2009: Kyung Hee University

Senior career*
Years	Team	Apps	(Gls)
2010–2011	Gyeongnam FC	3	(0)
2011–2013	Daegu FC	18	(2)
2014	Gwangju FC	11	(0)
2015–	Goyang Hi FC	57	(13)
- * Club domestic league appearances and goals as of 1 December 2016

- Kim You-sung
- Hangul: 김유성
- Hanja: 金侑聖
- RR: Gim Yuseong
- MR: Kim Yusŏng

Kim You-Sung (Korean: 김유성; born 4 December 1988) is a South Korean footballer who plays for Goyang Hi FC in the K League Challenge.
