= Lee Sang-duk =

South Korean footballer

Lee Sang-Duk
Personal information
- Full name: Lee Sang-Duk
- Date of birth: 5 November 1986 (age 40)
- Place of birth: South Korea
- Height: 1.87 m (6 ft 2 in)
- Position: Centre back

Youth career
- 2005–2008: Dong-A University

Senior career*
Years	Team	Apps	(Gls)
2009–2011	Daegu FC	26	(2)

International career
2011	South Korea	0	(0)
- * Club domestic league appearances and goals as of 13 January 2011

- Lee Sang-duk
- Hangul: 이상덕
- Hanja: 李相德
- RR: I Sangdeok
- MR: I Sangdŏk

Lee Sang-duk (Korean: 이상덕; born 5 November 1986) is a South Korean football centre back.

== Club career ==
Lee was selected by the Daegu FC in the fifth round of the 2009 K-League Draft on 20 November 2009. Lee made his K-League debut on 8 March 2009 in a match against Seongnam Ilhwa. He scored his first career K-league goal against Pohang Steelers in a 2–2 draw on 22 March 2009. He went on to score three goals in just seven games during the season.

It was announced in August 2011 that Lee would not be able to play in the all football league system in South Korea until August 2014, on a charge of being implicated in the 2011 South Korean football betting scandal.

== International career ==
Lee received his first call up to the South Korea squad for the friendly against Turkey on 10 February 2011, but he did not play in the game.

== Club career statistics ==
as of 25 July 2011

Club performance			League		Cup		League Cup		Total	
Season	Club	League	Apps	Goals	Apps	Goals	Apps	Goals	Apps	Goals
South Korea			League		KFA Cup		League Cup		Total	
2009	Daegu FC	K-League	5	1	0	0	2	2	7	3
2010	Daegu FC	K-League	21	1	1	0	5	0	27	1
2011	Daegu FC	K-League	13	1	1	0	3	0	17	1
Career total			39	3	2	0	10	2	51	5
