= Cho Hyung-ik =

South Korean footballer

Cho Hyung-Ik
Personal information
- Full name: Cho Hyung-Ik
- Date of birth: 13 September 1985 (age 41)
- Place of birth: South Korea
- Height: 1.73 m (5 ft 8 in)
- Position: Winger

Team information
- Current team: Daegu FC
- Number: 7

Youth career
- 2004–2007: Myongji University

Senior career*
Years	Team	Apps	(Gls)
2008–2011	Daegu FC	87	(13)
2013–	Daegu FC	58	(4)
- * Club domestic league appearances and goals as of 27 November 2014

- Cho Hyung-ik
- Hangul: 조형익
- Hanja: 趙亨翼
- RR: Jo Hyeongik
- MR: Cho Hyŏngik

Cho Hyung-Ik (Korean: 조형익; born 13 September 1985) is a South Korean footballer who plays as winger or midfielder.

== Club career ==
Cho Hyung-Ik was drafted from Myongji University in Yongin, just south of Seoul to Daegu FC for the 2008 season. A winger, he established himself as part of the first team squad, playing in over 30 games in all competitions in 2008. He continued to play a key role for the team in 2009, scoring 3 goals in the K-League, and a further 3 in the League Cup. In his third season with Daegu, Cho scored 8 league goals and added 1 goal in the League Cup.

On 5 March 2011, Cho scored his first goal of the new season with a goal in a 2–3 away loss against Gwangju FC. He was implicated in the 2011 South Korean football match-fixing scandal and was suspended from the K-League for 2 years.

In 2013, the K-League reduced his disciplinary punishment and he was allowed to return to professional football with Daegu FC.

== Club career statistics ==
As of 25 July 2011

Club performance			League		Cup		League Cup		Total	
Season	Club	League	Apps	Goals	Apps	Goals	Apps	Goals	Apps	Goals
South Korea			League		KFA Cup		League Cup		Total	
2008	Daegu FC	K-League	22	1	2	0	10	0	34	1
2009	Daegu FC	K-League	27	3	3	1	5	3	35	7
2010	Daegu FC	K-League	25	8	1	0	5	1	31	9
2011	Daegu FC	K-League	13	1	1	1	4	0	18	2
Career total			87	13	7	2	24	4	118	19
