= Lee Hyun-chang =

South Korean footballer

Lee Hyun-Chang
Personal information
- Full name: Lee Hyun-Chang
- Date of birth: 2 November 1985 (age 40)
- Place of birth: South Korea
- Height: 1.74 m (5 ft 9 in)
- Position: Midfielder

Team information
- Current team: Chungju Hummel
- Number: 3

Youth career
- 2005–2008: Yeungnam University

Senior career*
Years	Team	Apps	(Gls)
2009–2010	Daegu FC	38	(2)
2011–2012	Gangneung City	35	(1)
2013	Goyang Hi	12	(0)
2013–2014	Gangneung City	28	(1)
2015	Chungju Hummel	24	(1)
2016–2018	Cheonan City		
- * Club domestic league appearances and goals as of 23 December 2015

- Lee Hyun-chang
- Hangul: 이현창
- Hanja: 李炫昌
- RR: I Hyeonchang
- MR: I Hyŏnch'ang

Lee Hyun-chang (Korean: 이현창; born 2 November 1985) is a South Korean football midfielder who currently played for Chungju Hummel in the K League Challenge.

== Club career ==
Lee joined Daegu FC from Yeungnam University in time to feature in the 2009 K-League season. One of the more successful players of the 2009 intake, Lee played in the majority of the 2009 season matches, scoring one goal in the league, plus another in the FA Cup (against Suwon City FC).

== Career statistics ==
As of 13 January 2011

Club performance			League		Cup		League Cup		Total	
Season	Club	League	Apps	Goals	Apps	Goals	Apps	Goals	Apps	Goals
South Korea			League		KFA Cup		League Cup		Total	
2009	Daegu FC	K-League	19	1	3	1	2	0	24	2
2010	Daegu FC	K-League	19	1	1	0	3	0	23	1
Career total			38	2	4	1	5	0	47	3
