= Kim Dae-yeol =

South Korean footballer

Kim Dae-Yeol
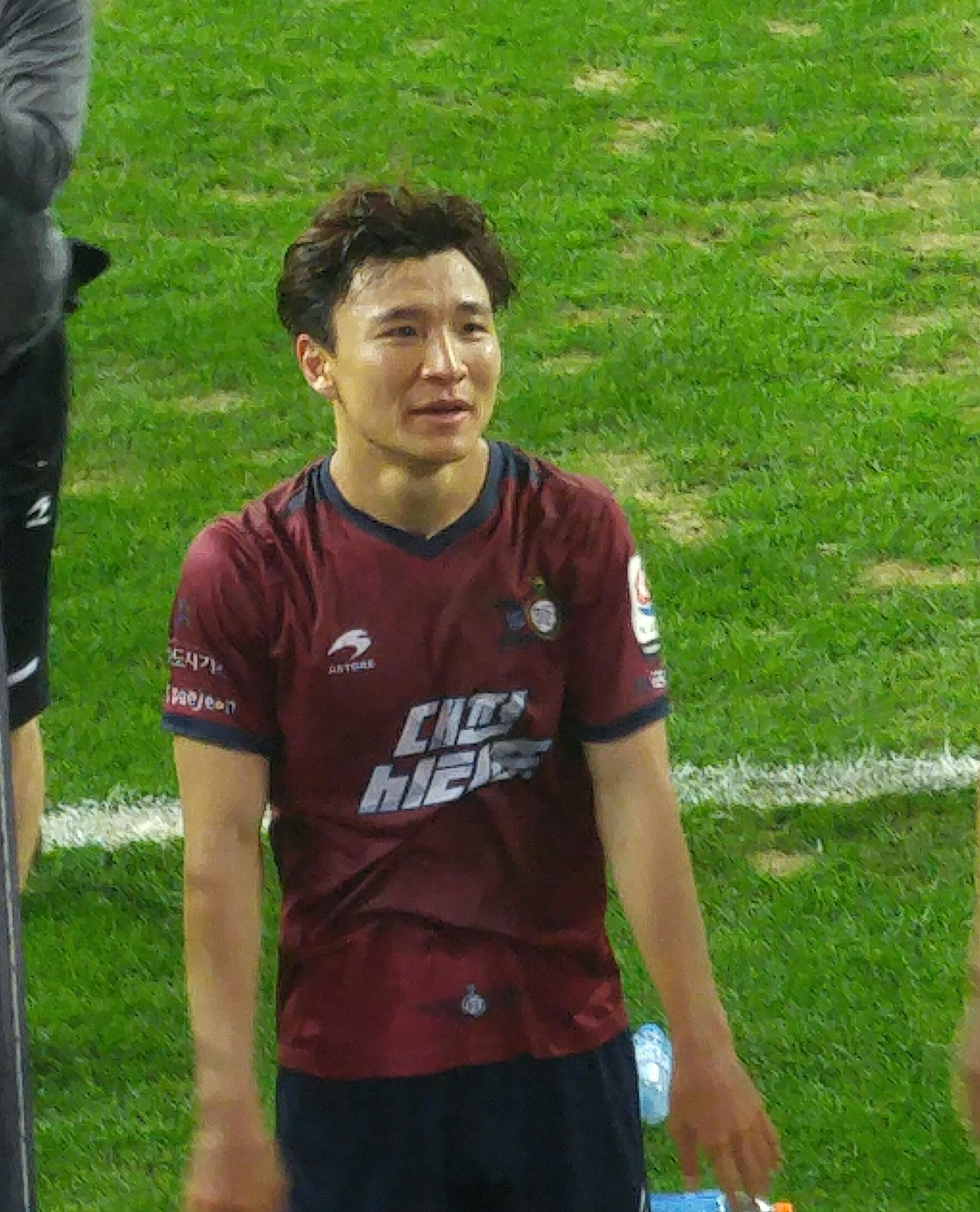

Personal information
- Full name: Kim Dae-Yeol
- Date of birth: 12 April 1987 (age 39)
- Place of birth: South Korea
- Height: 1.75 m (5 ft 9 in)
- Position: Midfielder

Team information
- Current team: Ansan Greeners
- Number: 27

Youth career
- 2006–2009: Dankook University

Senior career*
Years	Team	Apps	(Gls)
2010–2016	Daegu FC	95	(4)
2015–2016	→ Sangju Sangmu (army)	14	(0)
2017	Daejeon Citizen	32	(0)
2018	Cheonan City	22	(1)
2019–2022	Ansan Greeners	36	(2)
- * Club domestic league appearances and goals as of 2 June 2024

- Kim Dae-yeol
- Hangul: 김대열
- Hanja: 金大烈
- RR: Gim Daeyeol
- MR: Kim Taeyŏl

Kim Dae-yeol (Korean: 김대열; born 12 April 1987) is a South Korean former football midfielder. He made his professional debut in 2010, playing for Daegu FC in the K-League. He subsequently played for Sangju Sangmu, Daejeon Citizen, and latterly for Ansan Greeners in the K League 2, the second tier of football in South Korea.

== Club career ==
Kim, a draftee from the 2010 K-League draft intake, joined Daegu FC for the 2010 season. His professional debut was in an away match in the K-League Cup against Busan I'Park on 6 June 2010, a match which ended in a win for the visitors. His debut in the K-League itself was in a loss at home to Suwon Samsung Bluewings on 18 July 2010. He earned three yellow cards in his first four K-League matches. After limited appearances during the 2011 season, he was a regular starter for Daegu in 2012, and scored his first goal in Daegu's 3–0 win over the Chunnam Dragons on 14 June.

== Club career statistics ==
As of 1 June 2024

Club performance			League		Cup		League Cup		Total	
Season	Club	League	Apps	Goals	Apps	Goals	Apps	Goals	Apps	Goals
South Korea			League		KFA Cup		League Cup		Total	
2010	Daegu F.C.	K-League	4	0	0	0	2	0	6	0
2011	Daegu F.C.	K-League	7	0	0	0	1	0	8	0
2012	Daegu F.C.	K-League	37	1	1	0	-		38	1
2013	Daegu F.C.	K-League Classic	19	0	0	0	-		19	0
2014	Daegu F.C.	K League Challenge	26	3	0	0	-		26	3
2015	Sangju Sangmu FC	K League Challenge	7	0	0	0	-		7	0
2016	Sangju Sangmu FC	K-League Classic	7	0	0	0	-		7	0
2016	Daegu FC	K League Challenge	2	0	0	0	-		2	0
2017	Daejeon Hana Citizen	K League Challenge	32	0	0	0	-		32	0
2018	Cheonan City FC	Korea National League	22	1	1	0	-		23	1
2019	Ansan Greeners FC	K League 2	15	1	0	0	-		15	1
2020	Ansan Greeners FC	K League 2	17	1	0	0	-		17	1
2021	Ansan Greeners FC	K League 2	4	0	0	0	-		4	0
2022	Ansan Greeners FC	K League 2	0	0	0	0	-		0	0
Career total			199	7	2	0	3	0	204	7
