= Song Je-heon =

South Korean footballer (born 1986)

Song Je-Heon
Personal information
- Full name: Song Je-Heon
- Date of birth: 17 July 1986 (age 40)
- Place of birth: South Korea
- Height: 1.77 m (5 ft 9 1/2 in)
- Position: Forward

Team information
- Current team: Gyeongnam FC
- Number: 78

Youth career
- 2005–2008: Seonmum University

Senior career*
Years	Team	Apps	(Gls)
2009–2010	Pohang Steelers	2	(0)
2010–2012	Daegu FC	75	(20)
2013–2016	Jeonbuk Hyundai	28	(11)
2014–2015	Sangju Sangmu	15	(6)
2017–2018	Gyeongnam FC	14	(8)
- * Club domestic league appearances and goals as of 4 November 2017

- Song Je-heon
- Hangul: 송제헌
- Hanja: 宋制憲
- RR: Song Jeheon
- MR: Song Chehŏn

Song Je-Heon (Korean: 송제헌; born 17 July 1986) is a South Korean football forward, who plays for Gyeongnam FC in K League Classic.

== Club career ==
Song started his professional football career with the Pohang Steelers in 2009. On January 6, 2010, he transferred to Daegu FC, and became a regular in the senior squad, starting in a number of matches for the club.

== Club career statistics ==
As of 1 January 2013

Club performance			League		Cup		League Cup		Continental		Total	
Season	Club	League	Apps	Goals	Apps	Goals	Apps	Goals	Apps	Goals	Apps	Goals
South Korea			League		KFA Cup		League Cup		Asia		Total	
2009	Pohang Steelers	K League 1	2	0	1	0	1	0	1	0	5	0
2010	Daegu FC	K League 1	16	1	1	0	3	1	-		20	2
2011	Daegu FC	K League 1	23	8	0	0	2	0	-		25	8
2012	Daegu FC	K League 1	36	10	1	0	-		-		37	10
Career total			77	19	3	0	6	1	1	0	87	20
