= On Byung-hoon =

South Korean football player (born 1985)

On Byung-Hoon
Personal information
- Full name: On Byung-Hoon
- Date of birth: 7 August 1985 (age 41)
- Place of birth: Seoul, South Korea
- Height: 1.76 m (5 ft 9 in)
- Position: Midfielder

Team information
- Current team: Gimhae City

Youth career
- 2004–2005: Soongsil University

Senior career*
Years	Team	Apps	(Gls)
2006–2007	Pohang Steelers	0	(0)
2008–2009	Jeonbuk Hyundai Motors	8	(1)
2010–2011	Daegu FC	31	(1)
2013	Daegu FC	2	(0)
2013–	Gimhae City	0	(0)

International career^{‡}
2005	South Korea U-20	7	(0)
- * Club domestic league appearances and goals as of 25 July 2011 ‡ National team caps and goals as of 5 August 2013

- On Byung-hoon
- Hangul: 온병훈
- Hanja: 溫炳勳
- RR: On Byeonghun
- MR: On Pyŏnghun

On Byung-Hoon (Korean: 온병훈; born 7 August 1985) is a South Korean football player who plays for Gimhae City as a midfielder.

== Club career ==
A draftee from Soongsil University, On Byung-Hoon saw little game time with the Pohang Steelers from 2006 to 2007. On transferred to Jeonbuk Hyundai Motors for 2008, but still struggled to establish himself as a regular first team starter. After a total of 6 K-League games, and a single goal, in a two-year spell with Jeonbuk, On made a further move to Daegu FC for the 2010 season.

== International career ==
On was a member of the U-20 National side in 2005, and played 7 games.

== Club career statistics ==
As of 25 July 2011

Club performance			League		Cup		League Cup		Total	
Season	Club	League	Apps	Goals	Apps	Goals	Apps	Goals	Apps	Goals
South Korea			League		KFA Cup		League Cup		Total	
2006	Pohang Steelers	K-League	0	0	1	0	1	0	2	0
2007	Pohang Steelers	K-League	0	0	0	0	1	0	1	0
2008	Jeonbuk Hyundai	K-League	6	1	2	0	3	1	11	2
2009	Jeonbuk Hyundai	K-League	2	0	1	0	1	0	4	0
2010	Daegu FC	K-League	23	1	0	0	5	3	28	4
2011	Daegu FC	K-League	8	0	1	0	5	0	14	0
Career total			39	2	5	0	16	4	60	6
