= An Sung-min =

South Korean footballer

An Sung-Min
Personal information
- Date of birth: 3 November 1985 (age 40)
- Place of birth: Incheon, South Korea
- Height: 1.83 m (6 ft 0 in)
- Position: Midfielder

Youth career
- 2004–2006: Konkuk University

Senior career*
Years	Team	Apps	(Gls)
2007–2009	Busan I'Park	38	(3)
2010–2011	Daegu FC	32	(5)
Total		70	(8)
- * Club domestic league appearances and goals as of 25 July 2011

- An Sung-min
- Hangul: 안성민
- Hanja: 安成民
- RR: An Seongmin
- MR: An Sŏngmin

An Sung-Min (Korean: 안성민; born 3 November 1985) is a South Korean former footballer who played for Daegu FC in the K-League.

== Club career ==
An Sung-Min made his professional debut with Busan I'Park in 2007, and would stay a further two seasons. He played a total of 38 matches in the K-League in his time with Busan, scoring 3 league goals. He also made a number of appearances for the club in the Korean domestic cup competitions. For 2010, Ahn moved to Daegu FC. In July 2011, he related 2011 South Korean football betting scandal.
