= Lee Hyung-sang =

South Korean footballer

Lio
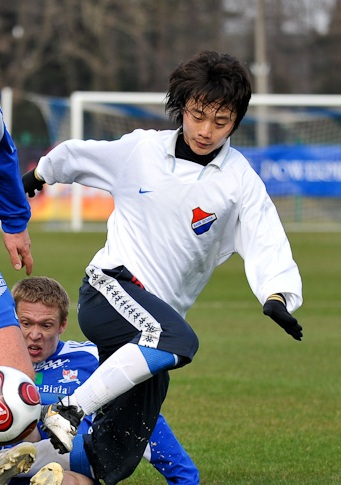

Personal information
- Full name: Lee Hyung-Sang
- Date of birth: 6 May 1985 (age 41)
- Place of birth: Pohang, South Korea
- Height: 1.70 m (5 ft 7 in)
- Position: Midfielder

Senior career*
Years	Team	Apps	(Gls)
2003	Ulsan Hyundai Horang-i	0	(0)
2004–2007	Daejeon Citizen	0	(0)
2007	Beira-Mar	0	(0)
2008	Feirense	0	(0)
2008	Spartak Varna	6	(0)
2009	Seongnam Ilhwa Chunma	6	(0)
2009–2010	Baník Ostrava	1	(0)
2010	HNK Šibenik	1	(0)
2011	Daegu FC	7	(0)
2012	Gangneung City	0	(0)
2012	Gimhae City	10	(0)
- * Club domestic league appearances and goals as of 12 July 2013

- Lee Hyung-sang
- Hangul: 이형상
- Hanja: 李形象
- RR: I Hyeongsang
- MR: I Hyŏngsang

Lee Hyung-Sang or simply Lio (Korean: 이형상; born 6 May 1985) is a South Korean football player.

Lee Hyung-Sang is an attacking midfielder, the winger type. His main advantages are his exceptional speed and maneuverability. He has good dribble and precise passing.

== Career ==
Lio start his professional career in Ulsan Hyundai, after which he plays for the elite Daejeon Citizen for four years. He played only 1 games in league cup. In 2007, he left for Europe and signed a contract with the Portuguese club S.C. Beira-Mar. After six months there, Lio was sold to C.D. Feirense. While there, the scouts of the Bulgarian Spartak Varna liked him and during the summer of 2008 he went to Bulgaria. In Spartak the Korean football player quickly becomes the favorite of the fans. Unfortunately, in the last friendly match of Spartak before the beginning of the Bulgarian championship Lio broke his arm and because of the fracture he did not play for about a month. In 2009, he returned to K-League by signing a contract with Seongnam Ilhwa Chunma.

In 2009, he signed a 3-year contract with Baník Ostrava making himself the first non-European player to ever play for the club. His first appearance for Baník Ostrava came on 8 August 2009, during a 1–0 win over Viktoria Plzeň by substitute on 90 minute.

On 4 January 2011, Lee joined Daegu FC. He made his Daegu FC debut in a 0–2 League Cup loss over Gyeongnam FC on 16 March 2011.
