= Hwang Il-su =

South Korean footballer

Personal information
- Full name: Hwang Il-su
- Date of birth: 8 August 1987 (age 39)
- Place of birth: Busan, South Korea
- Height: 1.73 m (5 ft 8 in)
- Positions: Winger; striker

Youth career
- Dong-A University

Senior career*
Years	Team	Apps	(Gls)
2010–2013	Daegu FC	124	(18)
2014–2017	Jeju United	44	(9)
2015–2016	→ Sangju Sangmu (army)	40	(4)
2017	Yanbian Funde	8	(1)
2018–2019	Ulsan Hyundai	55	(7)
2020–	Gyeongnam FC	42	(9)

International career^{‡}
2009	South Korea Universiade	6	(0)
2017–	South Korea	4	(0)
- * Club domestic league appearances and goals as of 5 December 2019 ‡ National team caps and goals as of 10 October 2017

- Hwang Il-su
- Hangul: 황일수
- Hanja: 黄一琇
- RR: Hwang Ilsu
- MR: Hwang Ilsu

Hwang Il-su (Korean: 황일수; born 8 August 1987) is a South Korean football player who plays for Gyeongnam FC as a midfielder.

== Club career ==
Hwang was a draftee pick for Daegu FC from Dong-A University for the 2010 season. Since the beginning of the season, he has been a regular in the first team, making his debut against Gwangju Sangmu on 27 February 2010. Hwang scored his first professional goal against Gangwon FC on 2 May 2010, and went on to score a second in the 1–2 away loss to Chunnam Dragons on 7 November 2010. During the 2010 season, he played in 31 games in all competitions, scoring 4 goals. Hwang stayed with Daegu for 2011, and scored Daegu's opening goal of the season in the club's 2–3 away loss to Gwangju FC on 5 March 2011.

Hwang transferred to Chinese Super League side Yanbian Funde on a two-year contract on 10 July 2017.

== Club career statistics ==
As of 23 October 2022

Club performance			League		Cup		League Cup		Continental		Other		Total	
Season	Club	League	Apps	Goals	Apps	Goals	Apps	Goals	Apps	Goals	Apps	Goals	Apps	Goals
South Korea			League		KFA Cup		League Cup		AFC		Other		Total	
2010	Daegu FC	K League 1	25	2	1	0	5	2	—		—		31	4
2011	Daegu FC	K League 1	27	2	1	0	5	2	—		—		33	4
2012	Daegu FC	K League 1	40	6	2	0	—		—		—		42	6
2013	Daegu FC	K League 1	32	8	1	0	—		—		—		33	8
2014	Jeju United	K League 1	31	7	0	0	—		—		—		31	7
2015	Sangju Sangmu (army)	K League 2	19	2	0	0	—		—		—		19	2
2016	Sangju Sangmu (army)	K League 1	21	2	0	0	—		—		—		21	2
2017	Jeju United	K League 1	13	1	1	0	—		7	1	—		21	2
China			League		FA Cup		League Cup		AFC		Other		Total	
2017	Yanbian Funde	Chinese Super League	8	1	0	0	—		—		—		8	1
South Korea			League		KFA Cup		League Cup		AFC		Other		Total	
2018	Ulsan Hyundai	K League 1	30	4	3	1	—		6	0	—		39	5
2019	Ulsan Hyundai	K League 1	24	3	0	0	—		4	1	—		28	4
2020	Gyeongnam FC	K League 2	21	5	0	0	—		—		—		21	5
2021	Gyeongnam FC	K League 2	21	4	2	0	—		—		—		23	4
2022	Gyeongnam FC	K League 2	2	0	0	0	—		—		1	0	3	0
Career total			314	47	11	1	10	4	17	2	1	0	353	54
