= Anderson Andrade =

Brazilian footballer (born 1981)

Personal information
- Full name: Anderson Andrade Antunes
- Date of birth: 15 November 1981 (age 44)
- Place of birth: Ibitinga, Brazil
- Height: 1.79 m (5 ft 10 in)
- Position: Striker

Team information
- Current team: Carmelita
- Number: 17

Senior career*
Years	Team	Apps	(Gls)
2003	Campinense		
2003	Atlético Monte Azul		
2004	Ferroviário		
2005	Fortaleza Esporte Clube		
2005	Grêmio Recreativo Barueri		
2006	Mito HollyHock	43	(17)
2007	Sagan Tosu	13	(2)
2007	Shimizu S-Pulse	1	(0)
2008	Yokohama F.C.	36	(16)
2009	Rio Branco de Andradas	6	(0)
2009	El Zamalek		
2009	Brujas FC	9	(8)
2010	Daegu FC	8	(2)
2010	Brujas FC	9	(3)
2010–2011	Barrio Mexico	3	(1)
2011	Valletta	11	(3)
2011–2012	Herediano	26	(6)
2012–2013	Alajuelense	23	(5)
2013–2014	Deportivo Mictlán		
2014–2016	Roasso Kumamoto	10	(4)
2016–2017	Liberia	19	(3)
2017–	Carmelita	10	(3)
- * Club domestic league appearances and goals as of 2 July 2013

Anderson Andrade Antunes (born 15 November 1981) is a Brazilian footballer who currently plays as a striker for AD Carmelita.

== Club career ==
After a short stint playing professionally in Mexico, and a subsequent four-year stint in his native Brazil, Anderson Andrade joined Japanese club Mito HollyHock for the 2006 J2 league season. He developed quickly into a fan favorite as he became one of the highest scorers in the division, placing 7th, with the best goal-per-shot ratio in Japanese professional soccer.

Following the conclusion of the 2006 season, he announced on 20 December that he would like to return to play soccer in Brazil for 2007. However, in January 2007, he was signed by Sagan Tosu. After seeing only limited matchplay for the first six months of his contract, on 16 June 2007, he joined Shimizu S-Pulse on loan. The move to Shizuoka was ultimately unsuccessful, and he joined J2 League team Yokohama FC for the 2008 season. The shift to Yokohama proved to be a more productive move than his previous two clubs, and he averaged a goal every two games.

Completing his Japanese contract, Anderson Andrade returned to Brazil in the summer of 2009, joining the team of Rio Branco de Andradas.

On 5 July 2009, Egyptian Premier League club El Zamalek officially announced the signing of a 3-year contract with Anderson. However, El Zamalek later canceled the deal without Anderson Andrade ever stepping foot on the football pitch in a competitive match for the club. The cancellation was put down to Anderson Andrade's lack of condition, as he apparently did not appear in good shape to play. In September 2009, Anderson moved to Brujas FC of Costa Rica, where he would score eight goals in nine league matches.

Anderson Andrade has since moved to K-League club Daegu FC, in South Korea. He scored his first goal for them on 28 March, in a 2-1 win over Daejeon Citizen, and went on to play eight league matches, as well as three league cup appearances for the Korean club, before returning his former club Brujas FC during the K-League midseason summer break.

On 2 February 2010, Valletta F.C., a Maltese Premier League team, presented the player as their new purchase, with a contract until the end of the season.

In July 2011, he returned to Costa Rica to join C.S. Herediano. In July 2014, he transferred to Roasso Kumamoto.

== Club statistics ==
Updated to 23 February 2016.

Club performance			League		Cup		Total	
Season	Club	League	Apps	Goals	Apps	Goals	Apps	Goals
Japan			League		Emperor's Cup		Total	
2006	Mito HollyHock	J2 League	43	17	1	0	44	17
2007	Sagan Tosu	J2 League	13	2	0	0	13	2
2007	Shimizu S-Pulse	J1 League	1	0	0	0	1	0
2008	Yokohama FC	J2 League	36	16	1	0	37	16
2014	Roasso Kumamoto	J2 League	7	4	0	0	7	4
2015	Roasso Kumamoto	J2 League	3	0	0	0	3	0
Total			103	39	2	0	105	39
