= 2010 Gangwon FC season =

Gangwon FC
2010 season
- Chairman: Kim Jin-Sun (governor)
- Manager: Choi Soon-Ho
- K-League: 12th
- Korean FA Cup: Round of 32
- League Cup: Group Round
- Top goalscorer: League: Kim Young-Hoo (12); All: Kim Young-Hoo (13)
- Highest home attendance: 19,285 vs Incheon United (5 May 2010)
- Lowest home attendance: 3,271 vs Ulsan Hyundai (8 August 2010)
- Average home league attendance: 8,489
Home colours	Away colours	Third colours

The 2010 season was Gangwon FC's second season in the K-League in South Korea. Gangwon FC will be competing in K-League, League Cup and Korean FA Cup.

== Current squad ==
Note: Flags indicate national team as defined under FIFA eligibility rules; some limited exceptions apply. Players may hold more than one non-FIFA nationality.

No.	Pos.	Nation	Player
1	GK	KOR	Yoo Hyun
2	DF	KOR	Ha Jae-Hoon
3	MF	KOR	Lee Jung-Woon
4	DF	KOR	Kwak Kwang-Seon
5	DF	KOR	Kim Bong-Kyum
6	MF	KOR	Ahn Sung-Nam
7	MF	KOR	Lee Eul-Yong
8	MF	BRA	Renato Medeiros
9	FW	KOR	Kim Young-Hoo
10	FW	MKD	Baže Ilijoski
11	FW	KOR	Seo Dong-Hyun
12	DF	KOR	Lee Yoon-Eui
13	FW	KOR	Yoon Jun-Ha
14	MF	KOR	Kwon Soon-Hyung
15	MF	KOR	Kang Sun-Kyu
16	FW	KOR	Chung Kyung-Ho (Captain)
17	MF	KOR	Kim Chang-Hee
18	DF	CRO	Stipe Lapić
19	MF	KOR	Lee Chang-Hoon
21	GK	KOR	Kim Keun-Bae
22	MF	KOR	Lee Sang-don
23	DF	KOR	Kang Min-Woo

No.	Pos.	Nation	Player
24	DF	KOR	Baek Jong-Hwan
25	DF	KOR	Jung Chul-Woon
26	MF	KOR	Kim Seung-Myung
27	FW	KOR	Oh Won-Jong
28	MF	CHN	Li Chunyu
29	FW	KOR	Lee Dong-Hyun
30	FW	KOR	Lee Joon-Hyup
31	GK	KOR	Jeong San
32	DF	KOR	Park Sang-Jin
33	FW	KOR	Ha Jung-Heon
34	DF	KOR	No Kyung-Tae
35	MF	KOR	Kim Dong-Min
36	MF	KOR	Kim Sung-Kyun
37	MF	KOR	Seo Bo-Sung
38	MF	KOR	Lee Hun
39	MF	KOR	Kim Jung-Joo
40	MF	KOR	Kim Woo-Kyung
41	GK	KOR	Yang Han-Bin
42	DF	KOR	Baek Yong-Sun
43	DF	KOR	Ko Jae-Min
44	MF	KOR	Shin Hyun-Joon

=== Out on loan ===
Note: Flags indicate national team as defined under FIFA eligibility rules; some limited exceptions apply. Players may hold more than one non-FIFA nationality.

No.	Pos.	Nation	Player
45	MF	KOR	Son Dae-Sung (to Incheon Korail)
46	FW	KOR	Kim Dae-Sik (to Yongin City)

== K-League ==
Date	Opponents	H / A	Result F – A	Scorers	Attendance	League position
27 February	Seongnam Ilhwa Chunma	A	0–3		4,162	15th
7 March	FC Seoul	H	0–3		9,828	15th
13 March	Daejeon Citizen	H	2–2	Ahn Sung-Nam 23', Kwon Soon-Hyung 49'	5,289	14th
20 March	Pohang Steelers	A	0–4		8,113	14th
28 March	Chunnam Dragons	H	5–2	Ahn Sung-Nam 34', 77', Kim Young-Hoo 37', 45+2', 79'	8,186	13th
3 April	Ulsan Hyundai	A	0–1		5,131	14th
11 April	Gyeongnam FC	H	1–2	Choi Young-Nam 78'	4,518	14th
18 April	Busan I'Park	H	0–0		11,126	15th
24 April	Suwon Samsung Bluewings	A	2–1	Kim Young-Hoo 67', 79'	22,915	12th
2 May	Daegu FC	A	2–2	Ha Jung-Heon 14', 50'	6,076	10th
5 May	Incheon United	H	1–2	Kim Young-Hoo 26'	19,285	12th
9 May	Gwangju Sangmu	A	0–1		2,367	13th
17 July	Jeju United	A	0–5		3,314	14th
24 July	Jeonbuk Hyundai Motors	H	2–3	Kim Young-Hoo 35', Lee Chang-Hoon 48'	10,726	15th
7 August	Ulsan Hyundai	H	2–2	Baže 54', Kim Young-Hoo 61'	3,271	15th
14 August	Daejeon Citizen	A	2–1	Seo Dong-Hyun 35', Kim Young-Hoo 87'	5,035	13th
21 August	FC Seoul	A	1–2	Kwak Kwang-Seon 32'	20,559	13th
28 August	Daegu FC	H	1–0	Kim Young-Hoo 90+2'	10,263	12th
4 September	Suwon Samsung Bluewings	H	1–2	Own goal 90+1'	14,952	12th
10 September	Jeonbuk Hyundai Motors	A	3–1	Chung Kyung-Ho 15', 58', Seo Dong-Hyun 41'	5,064	12th
18 September	Busan I'Park	A	1–1	Kwak Kwang-Seon 64'	5,104	12th
26 September	Seongnam Ilhwa Chunma	H	1–2	Kim Young-Hoo 9'	5,112	12th
3 October	Chunnam Dragons	A	1–2	Chung Kyung-Ho 43'	12,753	12th
9 October	Jeju United	H	1–4	Kim Young-Hoo 90'(pen)	7,527	12th
17 October	Gyeongnam FC	A	1–1	Seo Dong-Hyun 7'	10,123	12th
27 October	Gwangju Sangmu	H	1–0	Baek Jong-Hwan 90'	4,721	12th
3 November	Incheon United	A	3–1	Kim Young-Hoo 51', Seo Dong-Hyun 57', Ahn Sung-Nam 85'	1,255	12th
7 November	Pohang Steelers	H	2–0	Seo Dong-Hyun 52', Ahn Sung-Nam 88'	18,716	12th

Pos	Team	Pld	W	D	L	GF	GA	GD	Pts
10	Jeonnam Dragons	28	8	8	12	40	49	−9	32
11	Incheon United	28	8	7	13	42	51	−9	31
12	Gangwon FC	28	8	6	14	36	50	−14	30
13	Daejeon Citizen	28	5	7	16	27	50	−23	22
14	Gwangju Sangmu	28	3	10	15	17	43	−26	19

Source: K League (in Korean)
Rules for classification: 1) Points; 2) Goal difference; 3) Goals scored

Pos	Team	Qualification
1	FC Seoul (C)	Qualification for the Champions League
2	Jeju United	Qualification for the Champions League
3	Jeonbuk Hyundai Motors	Qualification for the Champions League
4	Seongnam Ilhwa Chunma	
5	Ulsan Hyundai	
6	Gyeongnam FC	

Source: RSSSF
(C) Champions

== Korean FA Cup ==
Date	Round	Opponents	H / A	Result F – A	Scorers	Attendance
21 April 2010	Round of 32	Daejeon KHNP	A	0–1		300

== League Cup ==
=== Group A ===
Date	Opponents	H / A	Result F – A	Scorers	Attendance	Group position
26 May	Jeonbuk Hyundai Motors	H	1 – 4	Kim Young-Hoo 22'	5,112	5th
29 May	Suwon Samsung Bluewings	A	0 – 2		18,277	5th
2 June	Chunnam Dragons	A	0 – 3		8,653	5th
6 June	Gyeongnam FC	H	1 – 2	Lee Chang-Hoon 89'	3,651	5th

Pos	Team	Pld	W	D	L	GF	GA	GD	Pts	JHM	GNM	SSB	JND	GWN
1	Jeonbuk Hyundai Motors	4	3	1	0	10	4	+6	10	—	2–1	—	1–1	—
2	Gyeongnam FC	4	3	0	1	8	4	+4	9	—	—	4–1	1–0	—
3	Suwon Samsung Bluewings	4	2	0	2	7	9	−2	6	1–3	—	—	—	2–0
4	Jeonnam Dragons	4	1	1	2	6	5	+1	4	—	—	2–3	—	3–0
5	Gangwon FC	4	0	0	4	2	11	−9	0	1–4	1–2	—	—	—

Source: RSSSF

== Squad statistics ==
=== Appearances and goals ===
Statistics accurate as of match played 7 November 2010

No.	Nat.	Pos.	Name	League		FA Cup		League Cup		Appearances		Goals
No.	Nat.	Pos.	Name	Apps	Goals	Apps	Goals	Apps	Goals	App (sub)	Total	Goals
1	(South Korea)	GK	Yoo Hyun	23 (1)	0	1	0	4	0	28 (1)	29	0
2	(South Korea)	DF	Ha Jae-Hoon	8 (1)	0	1	0	1 (1)	0	10 (2)	12	0
3	(South Korea)	MF	Lee Jung-Woon	0 (1)	0	0	0	0	0	0 (1)	1	0
4	(South Korea)	DF	Kwak Kwang-Seon	26	2	1	0	3 (1)	0	30 (1)	31	2
5	(South Korea)	DF	Kim Bong-Kyum	7 (1)	0	0	0	0 (1)	0	7 (2)	9	0
6	(South Korea)	MF	Ahn Sung-Nam	16 (7)	5	1	0	3	0	20 (7)	27	5
7	(South Korea)	MF	Lee Eul-Yong	15 (2)	0	0	0	0	0	15 (2)	17	0
8	(Brazil)	MF	Renato Medeiros	0 (4)	0	0	0	0	0	0 (4)	4	0
9	(South Korea)	FW	Kim Young-Hoo	27 (1)	13	1	0	4	1	32 (1)	33	14
10	(North Macedonia)	FW	Baže Ilijoski	3 (4)	1	0	0	0	0	3 (4)	7	1
11	(South Korea)	FW	Seo Dong-Hyun	11 (2)	5	0	0	0	0	11 (2)	13	5
12	(South Korea)	DF	Lee Yoon-Eui	0	0	0	0	0	0	0	0	0
13	(South Korea)	FW	Yoon Jun-Ha	4 (10)	0	1	0	3	0	8 (10)	18	0
14	(South Korea)	MF	Kwon Soon-Hyung	16 (6)	1	0	0	4	0	20 (6)	26	1
15	(South Korea)	MF	Kang Sun-Kyu	5	0	0	0	0	0	5 (0)	5	0
16	(South Korea)	FW	Chung Kyung-Ho (C)	23 (1)	3	1	0	2	0	26 (1)	27	3
17	(South Korea)	MF	Kim Chang-Hee	8	0	0	0	2	0	10 (0)	10	0
18	(Croatia)	DF	Stipe Lapić	19 (1)	0	1	0	0	0	20 (1)	21	0
19	(South Korea)	MF	Lee Chang-Hoon	19 (2)	1	0	0	3 (1)	1	22 (3)	25	2
21	(South Korea)	GK	Kim Keun-Bae	5 (1)	0	0	0	0	0	5 (1)	6	0
22	(South Korea)	MF	Lee Sang-don	16	0	0	0	0	0	16 (0)	16	0
23	(South Korea)	DF	Kang Min-Woo	0	0	0	0	0	0	0	0	0
24	(South Korea)	DF	Baek Jong-Hwan	5 (2)	1	0	0	0	0	5 (2)	7	1
25	(South Korea)	DF	Jung Chul-Woon	4 (3)	0	0 (1)	0	4	0	8 (4)	12	0
26	(South Korea)	MF	Kim Seung-Myung	1 (1)	0	0	0	1	0	2 (1)	3	0
27	(South Korea)	FW	Oh Won-Jong	3 (5)	0	1	0	0 (1)	0	4 (6)	10	0
28	(China)	MF	Li Chunyu	7	0	0	0	0	0	7 (0)	7	0
29	(South Korea)	FW	Lee Dong-Hyun	0 (3)	0	0	0	0 (2)	0	0 (5)	5	0
30	(South Korea)	FW	Lee Joon-Hyup	0 (3)	0	0	0	0	0	0 (3)	3	0
31	(South Korea)	GK	Jeong San	0	0	0	0	0	0	0	0	0
32	(South Korea)	DF	Park Sang-Jin	18	0	1	0	4	0	23 (0)	23	0
33	(South Korea)	FW	Ha Jung-Heon	6 (7)	2	0 (1)	0	3 (1)	0	9 (9)	18	2
34	(South Korea)	DF	No Kyung-Tae	0	0	0	0	0	0	0	0	0
35	(South Korea)	DF	Kim Dong-Min	0	0	0	0	0	0	0	0	0
36	(South Korea)	MF	Kim Sung-Kyun	0 (1)	0	0	0	0	0	0 (1)	1	0
37	(South Korea)	MF	Seo Bo-Sung	0	0	0	0	0	0	0	0	0
38	(South Korea)	FW	Lee Hun	0	0	0	0	0	0	0	0	0
39	(South Korea)	MF	Kim Jung-Joo	0 (6)	0	0 (1)	0	0 (1)	0	0 (8)	8	0
40	(South Korea)	MF	Kim Woo-Kyung	0	0	0	0	0	0	0	0	0
41	(South Korea)	GK	Yang Han-Bin	0	0	0	0	0	0	0	0	0
42	(South Korea)	DF	Baek Yong-Sun	0	0	0	0	0	0	0	0	0
43	(South Korea)	DF	Ko Jae-Min	0	0	0	0	0	0	0	0	0
44	(South Korea)	MF	Shin Hyun-Joon	0	0	0	0	0	0	0	0	0
3	(South Korea)	MF	Choi Young-Nam (out)	9 (1)	1	0	0	3	0	12 (1)	13	1
11	(South Korea)	FW	Kim Jin-Il (out)	0	0	0	0	0 (1)	0	0 (1)	1	0
15	(South Korea)	FW	Kim Chang-Hwi (out)	0	0	1	0	0	0	1 (0)	1	0
20	(South Korea)	MF	Kim Kyung-Choon (out)	1 (1)	0	0 (1)	0	0	0	1 (2)	3	0
22	(South Korea)	MF	Park Jong-Jin (out)	2 (2)	0	0	0	0	0	2 (2)	4	0
24	(South Korea)	MF	Kim Joon-Tae (out)	1 (3)	0	0	0	0	0	1 (3)	4	0
28	(Brazil)	FW	Caion (out)	0	0	0	0	0	0	0	0	0
35	(South Korea)	DF	Kim Tae-Ho (out)	0	0	0	0	0	0	0	0	0

=== Top scorers ===
Position	Nation	Number	Name	K-League	KFA Cup	League Cup	Total
1	(South Korea)	9	Kim Young-Hoo	13	0	1	14
2	(South Korea)	6	Ahn Sung-Nam	5	0	0	5
=	(South Korea)	11	Seo Dong-Hyun	5	0	0	5
3	(South Korea)	16	Chung Kyung-Ho	3	0	0	3
4	(South Korea)	4	Kwak Kwang-Seon	2	0	0	2
=	(South Korea)	33	Ha Jung-Heon	2	0	0	2
=	(South Korea)	19	Lee Chang-Hoon	1	0	1	2
5	(South Korea)	3	Choi Young-Nam	1	0	0	1
=	(North Macedonia)	10	Baže Ilijoski	1	0	0	1
=	(South Korea)	14	Kwon Soon-Hyung	1	0	0	1
=	(South Korea)	24	Baek Jong-Hwan	1	0	0	1
/	/	/	Own Goals	1	0	0	1
			TOTALS	36	0	2	38

- NB: In 2010 season, Seo Dong-Hyun has two league goals in Suwon, his previous club and Lee Sang-don has one league cup goal in Suwon

=== Discipline ===
Position	Nation	Number	Name	K-League		KFA Cup		League Cup		Total	
Position	Nation	Number	Name	Booked	Sent off (straight red)	Booked	Sent off (straight red)	Booked	Sent off (straight red)	Booked	Sent off (straight red)
MF	(South Korea)	3	Lee Jung-Woon	1	0	0	0	0	0	1	0
DF	(South Korea)	4	Kwak Kwang-Seon	5	0	0	0	1	0	6	0
MF	(South Korea)	6	Ahn Sung-Nam	2	0	0	0	0	0	2	0
MF	(South Korea)	7	Lee Eul-Yong	2	0	0	0	0	0	2	0
FW	(South Korea)	9	Kim Young-Hoo	1	0	0	0	0	0	1	0
FW	(North Macedonia)	10	Baže Ilijoski	2	0	0	0	0	0	2	0
FW	(South Korea)	11	Seo Dong-Hyun	4	1	0	0	0	0	4	1
FW	(South Korea)	13	Yoon Jun-Ha	1	0	0	0	0	0	1	0
MF	(South Korea)	14	Kwon Soon-Hyung	1	0	0	0	0	0	1	0
FW	(South Korea)	16	Chung Kyung-Ho	4	0	0	0	0	0	4	0
DF	(Croatia)	18	Stipe Lapić	9	0	0	0	0	0	9	0
MF	(South Korea)	22	Lee Sang-don	1	0	0	0	0	0	1	0
DF	(South Korea)	24	Baek Jong-Hwan	1	0	0	0	0	0	1	0
DF	(South Korea)	25	Jung Chul-Woon	0	0	0	0	1	0	1	0
FW	(South Korea)	27	Oh Won-Jong	1	0	0	0	0	0	1	0
MF	(China)	28	Li Chunyu	2	0	0	0	0	0	2	0
FW	(South Korea)	29	Lee Dong-Hyun	1	0	0	0	0	0	1	0
FW	(South Korea)	30	Lee Joon-Hyup	2	0	0	0	0	0	2	0
DF	(South Korea)	32	Park Sang-Jin	1	0	0	0	0	0	1	0
FW	(South Korea)	33	Ha Jung-Heon	2	0	0	0	0	0	2	0
/	/	/	TOTALS	43	1	0	0	2	0	45	1

== Transfer ==
=== In ===
Date	Pos.	Name	From	Source
17 November 2009	FW	(South Korea) Kim Chang-Hwi	(South Korea) Changwon City	
17 November 2009	MF	(South Korea) Choi Young-Nam	(South Korea) Ulsan Hyundai Mipo Dolphin	
17 November 2009	GK	(South Korea) Yang Han-Bin	(South Korea) Baekam High School	
17 November 2009	FW	(South Korea) Lee Dong-Hyun	(South Korea) Kyunghee University	
17 November 2009	DF	(South Korea) Lee Yoon-Eui	(South Korea) Kwangwoon University	
17 November 2009	FW	(South Korea) Ha Jung-Heon	(South Korea) Suwon City	
17 November 2009	DF	(South Korea) Baek Yong-Sun	(South Korea) Jeonju University	
17 November 2009	DF	(South Korea) Kang Min-Woo	(South Korea) Dongguk University	
17 November 2009	MF	(South Korea) Kim Joon-Tae	(South Korea) Changwon City	
17 November 2009	MF	(South Korea) Kim Jung-Joo	(South Korea) Gangneung Jeil High School	
17 November 2009	MF	(South Korea) Kim Seung-Myung	(South Korea) Jeonju University	
17 November 2009	MF	(South Korea) Son Dae-Sung	(South Korea) Kwandong University	
5 December 2009	DF	(South Korea) Kim Tae-Ho	(South Korea) Cheonan City	
January 2010	MF	(South Korea) Kim Kyung-Choon	(South Korea) Suwon City	
January 2010	MF	(South Korea) Kim Chang-Hee	(South Korea) Yeungnam University	
January 2010	DF	(South Korea) Ko Jae-Min	(South Korea) Hyundai High School	
January 2010	FW	(South Korea) Lee Joon-Hyup	(South Korea) Kwandong University	
January 2010	FW	(South Korea) Lee Hun	(South Korea) Jeju Jungang High School	
January 2010	MF	(South Korea) Kim Woo-Kyung	(South Korea) Mukho High School	
January 2010	MF	(South Korea) Seo Bo-Sung	(South Korea) Seogwipo High School	
January 2010	MF	(South Korea) Kim Sung-Kyun	(South Korea) Seongnam Ilhwa Chunma	
January 2010	DF	(South Korea) Park Sang-Jin	(South Korea) Kyunghee University	
March 2010	FW	(South Korea) Kim Dae-Sik	(South Korea) Ulsan Hyundai Mipo Dolphin	
2 July 2010	MF	(Brazil) Renato Medeiros	(Brazil) Universidadeard	Free Agent
2 July 2010	FW	(North Macedonia) Baže Ilijoski	(North Macedonia) Metalurg Skopje	Free Agent
9 July 2010	DF	(South Korea) Lee Jung-Woon	(South Korea) Gangneung City	
9 July 2010	MF	(South Korea) Kang Sun-Kyu	(South Korea) Daejeon Citizen	
9 July 2010	DF	(South Korea) Baek Jong-Hwan	(South Korea) Jeju United	
9 July 2010	DF	(South Korea) Kim Dong-Min	(South Korea) Ulsan Hyundai	
12 July 2010	FW	(South Korea) Seo Dong-Hyun	(South Korea) Suwon Samsung Bluewings	
12 July 2010	MF	(South Korea) Lee Sang-don	(South Korea) Suwon Samsung Bluewings	
22 July 2010	MF	(China) Li Chunyu	(Serbia) FK Rad	Free Agent

=== Out ===
Date	Pos.	Name	To	Source
30 November 2009	DF	(South Korea) Jeon Won-Keun	(South Korea) Daegu FC	
5 January 2010	DF	(South Korea) Lee Ho	(South Korea) Daejeon Citizen	
7 January 2010	DF	(South Korea) Lee Se-In	(China) Changchun Yatai	
8 January 2010	MF	(South Korea) Moon Joo-Won	(Japan) Sagan Tosu	
18 January 2010	MF	(Japan) Masahiro Ōhashi	(Japan) Mito Hollyhock	
January 2010	FW	(South Korea) Lee Sung-Min	(South Korea) Gangneung City	
January 2010	DF	(South Korea) Kang Yong	(South Korea) Chunnam Dragons	Loan end
January 2010	MF	(South Korea) Chu Jung-Hyun	unattached	Free agent
January 2010	MF	(South Korea) Kim Ju-Bong	unattached	Released
January 2010	DF	(South Korea) Moon Byung-Woo	unattached	Released
January 2010	MF	(South Korea) Kwon Kyung-Ho	unattached	Released
June 2010	FW	(Brazil) Caion	unattached	Cancel a contract
2 July 2010	FW	(South Korea) Kim Chang-Hwi	(South Korea) Changwon City	
2 July 2010	MF	(South Korea) Choi Young-Nam	(South Korea) Ulsan Hyundai Mipo Dolphin	
2 July 2010	DF	(South Korea) Kim Tae-Ho	(South Korea) Cheonan City	
2 July 2010	MF	(South Korea) Kim Kyung-Choon	(South Korea) Busan Transportation Corporation	
2 July 2010	FW	(South Korea) Kim Jin-Il	(South Korea) Goyang KB Kookmin Bank	
2 July 2010	MF	(South Korea) Hwang Dae-Kyun	(South Korea) Chungju Hummel	
9 July 2010	MF	(South Korea) Kim Joon-Tae	(South Korea) Changwon City	
12 July 2010	MF	(South Korea) Park Jong-Jin	(South Korea) Suwon Samsung Bluewings	
