= 2009 Gangwon FC season =

Gangwon FC
2009 season
- Chairman: Kim Jin-Sun (governor)
- Manager: Choi Soon-Ho
- K-League: 13th
- Korean FA Cup: Round of 16
- Peace Cup Korea: Group Stage
- Top goalscorer: League: Kim Young-Hoo (13); All: Kim Young-Hoo (13)
- Highest home attendance: 21,316 vs Jeju United (8 March 2009)
- Lowest home attendance: 5,129 vs Daegu FC (16 May 2009)
- Average home league attendance: 12,919
Home colours	Away colours

The 2009 season was Gangwon FC's first ever season in the K-League in South Korea. Gangwon FC competed in K-League, League Cup and Korean FA Cup. In K-League, they won two consecutive games at first, but failed to win any of their following eight matches. They were eliminated from the League Cup as of May 5, 2009 after losing to Incheon United by 2–3. Gangwon won three games consecutively in the league by June 27. In Korean FA Cup 2009, however, they lost to Chunnam Dragons on 1 July.

== Squad ==
Note: Flags indicate national team as defined under FIFA eligibility rules; some limited exceptions apply. Players may hold more than one non-FIFA nationality.

No.	Pos.	Nation	Player
1	GK	KOR	Yoo Hyun
2	MF	KOR	Kang Yong (on loan from Chunnam Dragons)
3	DF	KOR	Jeon Won-Keun
4	DF	KOR	Kwak Kwang-Seon
5	DF	KOR	Kim Bong-Kyum
6	MF	KOR	Ahn Sung-Nam
7	MF	KOR	Lee Eul-Yong (captain)
8	MF	JPN	Masahiro Ōhashi
9	FW	KOR	Kim Young-Hu
10	FW	KOR	Chung Kyung-Ho
11	FW	KOR	Kim Jin-Il
12	DF	KOR	Ha Jae-Hoon
13	FW	KOR	Yoon Jun-Ha
14	MF	KOR	Kwon Soon-Hyung
15	MF	KOR	Moon Joo-Won
16	DF	KOR	No Kyung-Tae
18	DF	CRO	Stipe Lapić

No.	Pos.	Nation	Player
19	MF	KOR	Lee Chang-Hoon
20	DF	KOR	Lee Ho
21	GK	KOR	Kim Keun-Bae
22	MF	KOR	Park Jong-Jin
23	MF	KOR	Kim Ju-Bong
24	DF	KOR	Moon Byung-Woo
25	MF	KOR	Chu Jung-Hyun
26	DF	KOR	Jung Chul-Woon
27	MF	KOR	Oh Won-Jong
28	FW	KOR	Lee Sung-Min
29	MF	KOR	Hwang Dae-Kyun
30	MF	KOR	Shin Hyun-Joon
31	GK	KOR	Jeong San
32	FW	BRA	Caion
33	DF	KOR	Lee Se-In
34	MF	KOR	Kwon Kyung-Ho

== K-League ==
Date	Opponents	H / A	Result F – A	Scorers	Attendance	League position
8 March	Jeju United	H	1 – 0	Jun–Ha 28'	21,316	4th
14 March	FC Seoul	A	2 – 1	Jin–Il 10', Jun–Ha 86'	15,409	1st
21 March	Busan I'Park	H	1 – 1	Jun–Ha 90+1'	16,814	2nd
5 April	Incheon United	A	0 – 2		21,254	5th
11 April	Chunnam Dragons	H	3 – 3	Kwang–Seon 14', Kim Young-Hoo 36'(p), 77'	12,575	3rd
26 April	Gwangju Sangmu Phoenix	A	1 – 3	Jun–Ha 31'	5,420	7th
2 May	Suwon Samsung Bluewings	H	1 – 1	Masahiro 17'	17,354	8th
10 May	Gyeongnam FC	A	0 – 1		9,438	10th
16 May	Daegu FC	H	2 – 2	Masahiro 61', Kwang–Seon 90+4'	5,129	9th
24 May	Ulsan Hyundai Horang-i	A	4 – 3	Kwang–Seon 17', Won–Jong 35', Won–Keun 51', Masahiro 60'	8,152	8th
21 June	Seongnam Ilhwa Chunma	H	4 – 1	Bong–Kyum 43', 63', Young–Hoo 46', Won–Jong 82'	16,742	5th
27 June	Jeonbuk Hyundai Motors	A	5 – 2	Won–Jong 4', Young–Hoo 41', 71', Jun–Ha 75', Chang–Hoon 88'	10,756	5th
4 July	Pohang Steelers	H	1 – 2	Young–Hoo 84' (p)	19,699	5th
12 July	Daejeon Citizen	A	2 – 2	own goal 2', Young–Hoo 36'	4,805	6th
19 July	FC Seoul	H	1 – 3	Young–Hoo 16'	21,012	6th
25 July	Busan I'Park	A	0 – 2		7,176	8th
2 August	Incheon United	H	3 – 2	Young–Hoo 47', 62, Lapić 57'	17,943	6th
15 August	Chunnam Dragons	A	1 – 4	Sung–Nam 55'	12,300	9th
30 August	Gwangju	H	2 – 2	Won–Jong 28', Young–Hoo 57'	14,237	9th
6 September	Suwon Samsung Bluewings	A	3 – 3	Young–Hoo 29', 59', Masahiro 49'	15,039	11th
12 September	Gyeongnam FC	H	0 – 4		15,912	12th
20 September	Daegu FC	A	1 – 2	Se–In 50'	3,414	13th
27 September	Ulsan Hyundai Horang-i	H	1 – 2	Jun–Ha 78'	8,895	13th
3 October	Seongnam Ilhwa Chunma	A	0 – 3		8,751	14th
11 October	Jeonbuk Hyundai Motors	H	1 – 3	Jun–Ha 45'	8,672	14th
17 October	Pohang Steelers	A	0 – 1		11,202	14th
24 October	Daejeon Citizen	H	1 – 2	Lapić 10'	10,724	14th
1 November	Jeju United	A	1 – 0	Caion 88'	2,522	13th

Pos	Team	Pld	W	D	L	GF	GA	GD	Pts
11	Gwangju Sangmu	28	9	3	16	33	40	−7	30
12	Busan IPark	28	7	8	13	36	42	−6	29
13	Gangwon FC	28	7	7	14	42	57	−15	28
14	Jeju United	28	7	7	14	22	44	−22	28
15	Daegu FC	28	5	8	15	20	45	−25	23

Source: K League (in Korean)
Rules for classification: 1) Points; 2) Goal difference; 3) Goals scored

Pos	Team	Qualification
1	Jeonbuk Hyundai Motors (C)	Qualification for the Champions League
2	Seongnam Ilhwa Chunma	Qualification for the Champions League
3	Pohang Steelers	Qualification for the Champions League
4	Jeonnam Dragons	
5	FC Seoul	
6	Incheon United	

Source: RSSSF
(C) Champions

== Korean FA Cup ==
Date	Round	Opponents	H / A	Result F – A	Scorers	Attendance
13 May 2009	Round of 32	Incheon Korail	H	2 – 2 (4 – 3 p)	Se–In 27', 47'	6,299
1 July 2009	Round of 16	Chunnam Dragons	A	0 – 1		?

== League Cup ==
Group stage

Date	Opponents	H / A	Result F – A	Scorers	Attendance	Group position
25 March	Seongnam Ilhwa Chunma	H	0 – 2		6,733	6th
8 April	Daegu FC	A	1 – 2	Joo–Won 1'	3,077	6th
22 April	Daejeon Citizen	H	3 – 0	Sung–Min 39', Kyung–Ho 78', 86'	6,733	5th
5 May	Incheon United	A	2 – 3	Jong–Jin 27', Sung–Min 56'	26,783	6th
27 May	Chunnam Dragons	H	1 – 2	own goal 52'	5,759	6th

Pos	Team	Pld	W	D	L	GF	GA	GD	Pts	SIC	ICU	DGU	JND	DJC	GWN
1	Seongnam Ilhwa Chunma	5	3	2	0	9	2	+7	11	—	1–1	—	4–1	—	—
2	Incheon United	5	2	2	1	6	6	0	8	—	—	—	—	1–0	3–2
3	Daegu FC	5	2	1	2	6	6	0	7	0–0	2–0	—	—	—	2–1
4	Jeonnam Dragons	5	2	1	2	8	10	−2	7	—	1–1	3–2	—	—	—
5	Daejeon Citizen	5	2	0	3	4	7	−3	6	0–2	—	2–0	2–1	—	—
6	Gangwon FC	5	1	0	4	7	9	−2	3	0–2	—	—	1–2	3–0	—

Source: RSSSF

== Squad statistics ==
=== Statistics ===
No.	Nat.	Pos.	Name	League		FA Cup		League Cup		Appearances		Goals
No.	Nat.	Pos.	Name	Apps	Goals	Apps	Goals	Apps	Goals	App (sub)	Total	Goals
1	(South Korea)	GK	Yoo Hyun	27	0	2	0	2	0	31 (0)	31	0
2	(South Korea)	MF	Kang Yong	12 (1)	0	0	0	1	0	13 (1)	14	0
3	(South Korea)	DF	Jeon Won-Keun	23 (3)	1	0	0	2	0	25 (3)	28	1
4	(South Korea)	DF	Kwak Kwang-Seon	26	3	0	0	2	0	28 (0)	28	3
5	(South Korea)	DF	Kim Bong-Kyum	15	2	1	0	2	0	18 (0)	18	2
6	(South Korea)	MF	Ahn Sung-Nam	17 (3)	1	1	0	0 (1)	0	18 (4)	22	1
7	(South Korea)	MF	Lee Eul-Yong (C)	22	0	0 (1)	0	2	0	24 (1)	25	0
8	(Japan)	MF	Masahiro Ōhashi	13 (7)	4	0	0	2	0	15 (7)	22	4
9	(South Korea)	FW	Kim Young-Hoo	25 (2)	13	0 (1)	0	3	0	28 (3)	31	13
10	(South Korea)	FW	Chung Kyung-Ho	7 (2)	0	0	0	0 (2)	2	7 (4)	11	2
11	(South Korea)	FW	Kim Jin-Il	5	1	0	0	0	0	5 (0)	5	1
12	(South Korea)	DF	Ha Jae-Hoon	16	0	1	0	2	0	19 (0)	19	0
13	(South Korea)	FW	Yoon Jun-Ha	14 (14)	7	2	0	2	0	18 (14)	32	7
14	(South Korea)	MF	Kwon Soon-Hyung	13 (2)	0	2	0	2 (1)	0	17 (3)	20	0
15	(South Korea)	MF	Moon Joo-Won	5 (4)	0	0	0	3	1	8 (4)	12	1
16	(South Korea)	DF	No Kyung-Tae	5	0	0	0	1 (1)	0	6 (1)	7	0
17	(South Korea)	MF	Lee Kang-Min	1 (5)	0	2	0	3 (1)	0	6 (6)	12	0
18	(Croatia)	DF	Stipe Lapić	11	2	0	0	0	0	11 (0)	11	2
19	(South Korea)	MF	Lee Chang-Hoon	18 (3)	1	1	0	3	0	22 (3)	25	1
20	(South Korea)	DF	Lee Ho	0	0	0	0	1	0	1 (0)	1	0
21	(South Korea)	GK	Kim Keun-Bae	1	0	0	0	3	0	4 (0)	4	0
22	(South Korea)	MF	Park Jong-Jin	5 (18)	0	2	0	2 (1)	1	9 (19)	28	1
23	(South Korea)	MF	Kim Ju-Bong	0	0	1	0	2 (1)	0	3 (1)	4	0
24	(South Korea)	DF	Moon Byung-Woo	0	0	1	0	1 (2)	0	2 (2)	4	0
25	(South Korea)	MF	Chu Jung-Hyun	0	0	0 (1)	0	0 (2)	0	0 (3)	3	0
26	(South Korea)	DF	Jung Chul-Woon	0 (3)	0	2	0	2 (1)	0	4 (4)	8	0
27	(South Korea)	MF	Oh Won-Jong	14 (2)	4	1 (1)	0	3	0	18 (3)	21	4
28	(South Korea)	FW	Lee Sung-Min	7 (5)	0	1 (1)	0	2 (2)	2	10 (8)	18	2
29	(South Korea)	MF	Hwang Dae-Kyun	0	0	0	0	0	0	0	0	0
30	(South Korea)	MF	Shin Hyun-Joon	0	0	0	0	0	0	0	0	0
31	(South Korea)	GK	Jung San	0	0	0	0	0	0	0	0	0
32	(Brazil)	FW	Caion	0 (7)	1	1	0	2	0	3 (7)	10	1
33	(South Korea)	DF	Lee Se-In	6 (1)	1	1	2	3	0	10 (1)	11	3
34	(South Korea)	MF	Kwon Kyung-Ho	0 (1)	0	0 (1)	0	2	0	2 (2)	4	0

Statistics accurate as of match played 1 November 2009

=== Top scorers ===
Position	Nation	Number	Name	K-League	KFA Cup	League Cup	Total
1	(South Korea)	9	Kim Young-Hoo	13	0	0	13
2	(South Korea)	13	Yoon Jun-Ha	7	0	0	7
3	(Japan)	8	Masahiro Ōhashi	4	0	0	4
=	(South Korea)	27	Oh Won-Jong	4	0	0	4
4	(South Korea)	4	Kwak Kwang-Seon	3	0	0	3
=	(South Korea)	33	Lee Se-In	1	2	0	3
5	(South Korea)	5	Kim Bong-Kyum	2	0	0	2
=	(Croatia)	18	Stipe Lapić	2	0	0	2
=	(South Korea)	10	Chung Kyung-Ho	0	0	2	2
=	(South Korea)	28	Lee Sung-Min	0	0	2	2
6	(South Korea)	3	Jeon Won-Keun	1	0	0	1
=	(South Korea)	6	Ahn Sung-Nam	1	0	0	1
=	(South Korea)	11	Kim Jin-Il	1	0	0	1
=	(South Korea)	19	Lee Chang-Hoon	1	0	0	1
=	(Brazil)	33	Caion	1	0	0	1
=	(South Korea)	15	Moon Joo-Won	0	0	1	1
=	(South Korea)	22	Park Jong-Jin	0	0	1	1
/	/	/	Own Goals	1	0	1	2
			TOTALS	42	2	7	51

=== Top assistors ===
Position	Nation	Number	Name	K-League	KFA Cup	League Cup	Total
1	(South Korea)	9	Kim Young-Hoo	8	0	0	8
2	(South Korea)	13	Yoon Jun-Ha	5	0	0	5
3	(South Korea)	19	Lee Chang-Hoon	3	0	1	4
=	(South Korea)	22	Park Jong-Jin	2	1	1	4
4	(South Korea)	3	Jeon Won-Keun	2	0	0	2
=	(South Korea)	7	Lee Eul-Yong	2	0	0	2
=	(Japan)	8	Masahiro Ōhashi	2	0	0	2
=	(South Korea)	14	Kwon Soon-Hyung	1	0	1	2
=	(Brazil)	33	Caion	1	0	1	2
=	(South Korea)	17	Lee Kang-Min	0	1	1	2
5	(South Korea)	1	Yoo Hyun	1	0	0	1
=	(South Korea)	2	Kang Yong	1	0	0	1
=	(South Korea)	6	Ahn Sung-Nam	1	0	0	1
=	(South Korea)	12	Ha Jae-Hoon	1	0	0	1
=	(South Korea)	27	Oh Won-Jong	1	0	0	1
			TOTALS	31	2	5	38

=== Discipline ===
Position	Nation	Number	Name	K-League		KFA Cup		League Cup		Total	
Position	Nation	Number	Name	Booked	Sent off (straight red)	Booked	Sent off (straight red)	Booked	Sent off (straight red)	Booked	Sent off (straight red)
DF	(South Korea)	3	Jeon Won-Keun	1	0	0	0	0	0	1	0
DF	(South Korea)	4	Kwak Kwang-Seon	2	0	0	0	1	0	3	0
DF	(South Korea)	5	Kim Bong-Kyum	3	0	0	0	0	0	3	0
MF	(South Korea)	6	Ahn Sung-Nam	2	0	0	0	0	0	2	0
MF	(South Korea)	7	Lee Eul-Yong	3	0	0	0	0	0	3	0
FW	(South Korea)	9	Kim Young-Hoo	4	0	0	0	0	0	4	0
DF	(South Korea)	12	Ha Jae-Hoon	2	0	0	0	0	0	2	0
FW	(South Korea)	13	Yoon Jun-Ha	2	0	0	0	0	0	2	0
MF	(South Korea)	14	Kwon Soon-Hyung	2	0	0	0	0	0	2	0
DF	(Croatia)	18	Stipe Lapić	2	0	0	0	0	0	2	0
MF	(South Korea)	19	Lee Chang-Hoon	3	0	0	0	0	0	3	0
MF	(South Korea)	22	Park Jong-Jin	1	0	0	0	0	0	1	0
MF	(South Korea)	23	Kim Ju-Bong	0	0	0	0	1	0	1	0
MF	(South Korea)	25	Chu Jung-Hyun	0	0	1	0	0	0	1	0
FW	(South Korea)	28	Lee Sung-Min	2	0	0	0	0	0	2	0
FW	(Brazil)	32	Caion	1	0	0	0	0	0	1	0
MF	(South Korea)	34	Kwon Kyung-Ho	0	0	1	0	0	0	1	0
			TOTALS	30	0	2	0	2	0	34	0

== Transfer ==
=== In ===
No.	Pos.	Player	From	Date
1	GK	(South Korea) Yoo Hyun	(South Korea) Ulsan Hyundai Mipo Dockyard	2008-11-18
4	DF	(South Korea) Kwak Kwang-Seon	(South Korea) Soongsil University	2008-11-18
5	DF	(South Korea) Kim Bong-Kyum	(South Korea) Ulsan Hyundai Mipo Dockyard	2008-11-18
6	MF	(South Korea) Ahn Sung-Nam	(South Korea) Ulsan Hyundai Mipo Dockyard	2008-11-18
9	FW	(South Korea) Kim Young-Hoo	(South Korea) Ulsan Hyundai Mipo Dockyard	2008-11-18
14	MF	(South Korea) Kwon Soon-Hyung	(South Korea) Korea University	2008-11-18
16	DF	(South Korea) No Kyung-Tae	(South Korea) Jeonju University	2008-11-18
20	DF	(South Korea) Lee Ho	(South Korea) Kyunghee University	2008-11-18
21	GK	(South Korea) Kim Keun-Bae	(South Korea) Korea University	2008-11-18
23	MF	(South Korea) Kim Ju-Bong	(South Korea) Soongsil University	2008-11-18
24	MF	(South Korea) Moon Byung-Woo	(South Korea) Myongji University	2008-11-18
26	DF	(South Korea) Jung Chul-Woon	(South Korea) Kwangwoon University	2008-11-18
31	GK	(South Korea) Jeong San	(South Korea) Kyunghee University	2008-11-18
34	MF	(South Korea) Kwon Kyung-Ho	(South Korea) Dongguk University	2008-11-18
3	DF	(South Korea) Jeon Won-Keun	(South Korea) Korea University	2008-11-20
13	FW	(South Korea) Yoon Jun-Ha	(South Korea) Daegu University	2008-11-20
17	MF	(South Korea) Lee Kang-Min	(South Korea) Gangneung City FC	2008-11-20
19	MF	(South Korea) Lee Chang-Hoon	(South Korea) University of Incheon	2008-11-20
22	MF	(South Korea) Park Jong-Jin	(Japan) JEF United Chiba	2008-11-20
25	MF	(South Korea) Chu Jung-Hyun	(South Korea) Myongji University	2008-11-20
28	FW	(South Korea) Lee Sung-Min	(South Korea) Honam University	2008-11-20
29	MF	(South Korea) Hwang Dae-Kyun	(South Korea) Korea University	2008-11-20
30	MF	(South Korea) Shin Hyun-Joon	(South Korea) Myongji University	2008-11-20
7	MF	(South Korea) Lee Eul-Yong	(South Korea) FC Seoul	2008-12-16
11	FW	(South Korea) Kim Jin-Il	(South Korea) Busan Transportation FC	2008 December
12	MF	(South Korea) Ha Jae-Hoon	(South Korea) Changwon City FC	2008 December
27	MF	(South Korea) Oh Won-Jong	(South Korea) Gangneung City FC	2008 December
8	MF	(Japan) Masahiro Ōhashi	(Japan) Kawasaki Frontale	2009-01-13
10	FW	(South Korea) Chung Kyung-Ho	(South Korea) Jeonbuk Hyundai Motors	2009-01-13
13	MF	(South Korea) Moon Joo-Won	(South Korea) Daegu FC	2009-01-13
33	DF	(South Korea) Lee Se-In	(South Korea) Busan I'Park	2009 February
32	FW	(Brazil) Caion	(Brazil) Iraty Sport Club	2009 March
18	DF	(Croatia) Stipe Lapić	(Croatia) NK Slaven Belupo	2009-07-28

Player in on loan

No.	Pos.	Player	From	Date	Date end
2	DF	(South Korea) Kang Yong	(South Korea) Chunnam Dragons	2009-02-06	End of season

=== Out ===
No.	Pos.	Player	To	Date
17	MF	(South Korea) Lee Kang-Min	unattached	2009 August
