= Kyung-tae =

- Hangul: 경태
- RR: Gyeongtae
- MR: Kyŏngt'ae

Kyung-tae is a Korean given name.

People with this name include:

- Han Kyung-tai (born 1975), South Korean handball player
- Kim Kyung-tae (born 1986), South Korean golfer
- No Kyung-tae (born 1986), South Korean football player
- Hwang Kyung-tae (born 1996), South Korean baseball pitcher
- Kim Kyeong-tae, South Korean judo practitioner, represented South Korea at the 2014 World Judo Championships – Men's 100 kg

Fictional characters with this name include

- Wang Gyeong-tae, in 1990 South Korean comic book Yeongsimi
- Ahn Kyung-tae, in 2009 South Korean television series Two Wives

== See also ==
- List of Korean given names
