= Lee Sung-min =

Lee Sung-min is a Korean name consisting of the family name Lee and the given name Sung-min, and may refer to:

- Clara Lee (born 1985), Swiss-born British actress and model active in South Korea, born Lee Sung-min
- Lee Sung-min (singer) (born 1986), South Korean pop singer and a member of Super Junior
- Lee Sung-min (actor) (born 1968), South Korean actor
- Lee Sung-min (footballer) (born 1986), South Korean footballer
