= Lee Kang-min =

Lee Kang-min may refer to:

- Lee Kang-min (footballer)
- Lee Kang-min (actor)
