= Kim Jin-il (disambiguation) =

Kim Jin-il may refer to:

- Jerry.K, a South Korean rapper
- Kim Jin-il, a South Korean football player
