= Lee Kang-min (footballer) =

South Korean football player

Lee Kang-Min
Personal information
- Date of birth: August 29, 1985 (age 41)
- Place of birth: South Korea
- Height: 1.77 m (5 ft 10 in)
- Position: Midfielder

Team information
- Current team: Busan Transportation Corporation
- Number: 22

Youth career
- 2004–2006: Kyung Hee University

Senior career*
Years	Team	Apps	(Gls)
2007–2008	Gangneung City	35	(6)
2009	Gangwon FC	6	(0)
2012	Chuncheon FC	?	(?)
2013–	Busan Transportation Corporation	0	(0)
- * Club domestic league appearances and goals as of August 2, 2009

- Korean name
- Hangul: 이강민
- Hanja: 李康敏
- RR: I Gangmin
- MR: I Kangmin

Lee Kang-min (born August 29, 1985) is a South Korean football player.

In 2007, he joined Korea National League side Gangneung City FC. In gangneung, he played 35 games and scored 6 goals.

On November 20, 2008, Gangwon was called Lee as extra order at 2009 K-League Draft.

== Club career statistics ==
As of 2 August 2009

Club performance			League		Cup		League Cup		Total	
Season	Club	League	Apps	Goals	Apps	Goals	Apps	Goals	Apps	Goals
South Korea			League		KFA Cup		League Cup		Total	
2007	Gangneung City	National League	13	3	0	0	-		13	3
2008	Gangneung City	National League	22	3	1	0	-		23	3
2009	Gangwon FC	K-League	6	0	2	0	4	0	12	0
Career total			41	6	3	0	4	0	48	6

== Honours ==
=== Club ===
Chuncheon FC

- Challengers League
  - Runners-up : 2012

=== Individual ===
- KFA Challengers League player of the Year: 2012
