= Kim Jun-tae (footballer) =

South Korean footballer (born 1985)

Personal information
- Date of birth: May 31, 1985 (age 41)
- Place of birth: South Korea
- Height: 1.79 m (5 ft 10 in)
- Position: Midfielder

Youth career
- 2004–2007: Hannam University

Senior career*
Years	Team	Apps	(Gls)
2008–2009	Changwon City	45	(8)
2010	Gangwon FC	4	(0)
2010–2014	Changwon City	61	(17)
2013–2014	→ Pocheon FC (loan)		
2015	Goyang Hi FC	38	(1)
2016–2018	Seoul E-Land	65	(1)
- * Club domestic league appearances and goals

- Kim Jun-tae
- Hangul: 김준태
- Hanja: 金俊泰
- RR: Gim Juntae
- MR: Kim Chunt'ae

Kim Jun-tae (Korean: 김준태; Hanja: 金俊泰, born 31 May 1985) is a retired South Korean football player who played as a midfielder.

== Club career ==
He started his career at Korea National League side Changwon City FC. On 17 November 2009, Gangwon called him as extra order at 2010 K-League Draft. His first K-League match was against Seongnam Ilhwa Chunma in Seongnam, which Gangwon lost by 0–3 in an away game on 27 February 2010.

In July 2010, he moved back to his previous club, Changwon City FC.

== Club career statistics ==
As of 28 March 2013

Club performance			League		Cup		League Cup		Total	
Season	Club	League	Apps	Goals	Apps	Goals	Apps	Goals	Apps	Goals
South Korea			League		KFA Cup		League Cup		Total	
2008	Changwon City FC	National League	23	1	2	0	—		25	1
2009	Changwon City FC	National League	22	7	0	0	—		22	7
2010	Gangwon FC	K-League	4	0	0	0	0	0	4	0
2010	Changwon City FC	National League	12	4	—		—		12	4
2011	Changwon City FC	National League	23	4	1	0	5	3	29	7
2012	Changwon City FC	National League	26	9	1	0	3	1	30	7
Total	South Korea		110	25	4	0	8	4	122	26
Career total			110	25	4	0	8	4	122	26

Note: appearances and goals include championship playoffs.
