= Oh Won-jong =

South Korean footballer

Oh Won-Jong
Personal information
- Full name: Oh Won-Jong (오원종)
- Date of birth: June 17, 1983 (age 43)
- Place of birth: South Korea
- Height: 1.70 m (5 ft 7 in)
- Position: Midfielder

Team information
- Current team: Busan TC
- Number: 34

Youth career
- 2002–2005: Yonsei University

Senior career*
Years	Team	Apps	(Gls)
2006	Gyeongnam FC	4	(0)
2007–2008	Gangneung City FC	21	(4)
2009–2012	Gangwon FC	24	(4)
2011–2012	→ Sangju Sangmu Phoenix (army)	3	(0)
2013–	Busan TC		
- * Club domestic league appearances and goals as of 5 July 2013

Oh Won-Jong (Korean: 오원종; Hanja: 吳源鐘, born June 17, 1983) is a South Korean football player who plays for Busan TC.

== Club career ==
He joined K-League side Gyeongnam FC in the 2006 draft. In Gyeongnam, he played 4 league games, and 4 league cup games. One year later, he moved to Korea National League side, Gangneung City FC. He played 21 games, scored 4 goals, and made 1 assist for Gangneung. From 2009, Oh played at newly formed Gangwon FC as founding member. On 29 November 2010, he joined Sangju Sangmu FC for military duty. On 3 September 2012, he discharged from military services and returned Gangwon FC.

== Club career statistics ==
As of 3 September 2012

Club performance			League		Cup		League Cup		Total	
Season	Club	League	Apps	Goals	Apps	Goals	Apps	Goals	Apps	Goals
South Korea			League		KFA Cup		League Cup		Total	
2006	Gyeongnam FC	K-League	4	0	1	0	4	0	9	0
2007	Gangneung City FC	National League	6	2	0	0	-		6	2
2008	Gangneung City FC	National League	15	2	1	0	-		16	2
2009	Gangwon FC	K-League	16	4	2	0	3	0	21	4
2010	Gangwon FC	K-League	8	0	1	0	1	0	10	0
2011	Sangju Sangmu Phoenix	K-League	3	0	0	0	2	0	5	0
2012	Sangju Sangmu Phoenix	K-League	0	0	0	0	-		0	0
2012	Gangwon FC	K-League	0	0	0	0	-		0	0
Career total			52	8	5	0	10	0	67	8
