= Choi Young-nam =

South Korean footballer (born 1984)

Choi Young-Nam
Personal information
- Full name: Choi Young-Nam (최영남)
- Date of birth: July 27, 1984 (age 42)
- Place of birth: South Korea
- Height: 1.71 m (5 ft 7 1/2 in)
- Position: Defender

Team information
- Current team: Ulsan Hyundai Mipo Dolphin FC
- Number: 32

Youth career
- 2003–2006: Ajou University

Senior career*
Years	Team	Apps	(Gls)
2007–2009	Ulsan Hyundai Mipo Dockyard	67	(6)
2010	Gangwon FC	10	(1)
2010–	Ulsan Hyundai Mipo Dolphin FC	11	(0)
2011–2013	→ Yangju Citizen (loan)	0	(0)
- * Club domestic league appearances and goals as of 2 July 2010

- Choi Young-nam
- Hangul: 최영남
- Hanja: 崔永男
- RR: Choe Yeongnam
- MR: Ch'oe Yŏngnam

Choi Young-Nam (Korean: 최영남; Hanja: 崔永男, born 27 July 1984) is a South Korean football player who plays as a fullback or centerback.

After graduating from university, Choi began his career at Korea National League side Ulsan Hyundai Mipo Dockyard. On 17 November 2009, Gangwon called him as a second order pick during the 2010 K-League Draft. His first K-League match was against Seongnam Ilhwa Chunma in Seongnam on 27 February 2010, which Gangwon lost 0-3. In July 2010, he moved back to Korea National League side Ulsan Hyundai Mipo Dockyard, his previous club.

== Honours ==
=== Club ===
Ulsan Hyundai Mipo Dockyard

- Korea National League (2) : 2007, 2008
- Korean President's Cup (1) : 2008

== Club career statistics ==
As of 2 March 2011

Club performance			League		Cup		League Cup		Total	
Season	Club	League	Apps	Goals	Apps	Goals	Apps	Goals	Apps	Goals
South Korea			League		KFA Cup		League Cup		Total	
2007	Ulsan Hyundai Mipo Dockyard	Korea National League	21	0	2	0	-		23	0
2008	Ulsan Hyundai Mipo Dockyard	Korea National League	26	2	1	0	-		27	2
2009	Ulsan Hyundai Mipo Dockyard	Korea National League	20	4	0	0	-		20	4
2010	Gangwon FC	K-League	10	1	1	0	3	0	14	1
2010	Ulsan Hyundai Mipo Dockyard	Korea National League	11	0	0	0	-		11	0
Total	South Korea		88	7	4	0	3	0	95	7
Career total			88	7	4	0	3	0	95	7

Note: appearances and goals include championship playoffs.
