= Ahn Sung-nam =

South Korean footballer

Ahn Sung-Nam
Personal information
- Full name: Ahn Sung-Nam (안성남)
- Date of birth: April 17, 1984 (age 42)
- Place of birth: Dongducheon, Gyeonggi-do, South Korea
- Height: 1.74 m (5 ft 9 in)
- Position: Midfielder

Team information
- Current team: Gyeongnam FC
- Number: 8

Youth career
- 2003–2006: Chung-Ang University

Senior career*
Years	Team	Apps	(Gls)
2007–2008	Ulsan Hyundai Mipo Dockyard	48	(19)
2009–2011	Gangwon FC	43	(6)
2011	→ Gwangju FC (loan)	21	(2)
2012–2015	Gwangju FC	25	(0)
2013–2014	→ FC Pocheon (loan)	8	(0)
2015	→ Gangwon FC (loan)	7	(0)
2016–	Gyeongnam FC	92	(5)
- * Club domestic league appearances and goals as of 6 January 2020

Ahn Sung-Nam (Korean: 안성남; Hanja: 安成男, born April 17, 1984) is a South Korean footballer who plays as a midfielder for Gyeongnam FC.

== Club career ==
=== Ulsan Mipo Dockyard ===
After he graduated from Chung-Ang University, he joined Korea National League's side Ulsan Hyundai Mipo Dockyard. He has scored 19 goals for two seasons.

=== Gangwon FC ===
In 2009, he moved to the newly formed Gangwon FC as a founding member with former Ulsan Hyundai Mipo Dockyard manager Choi Soon-Ho. At the first K-League match against Jeju United, he was injured unexpectedly and will have to go through rehab for eight weeks. On 15 August 2009, he scored his first K-League goal against Chunnam Dragons.

=== Gwangju FC ===
In January 2011, Ahn Sung-Nam joined Gwangju FC on loan for 1 year. After a loan spell, he completed his free transfer to Gwangju on 25 December 2011.

=== Statistics ===
As of 31 October 2011

Club performance			League		Cup		League Cup		Total	
Season	Club	League	Apps	Goals	Apps	Goals	Apps	Goals	Apps	Goals
South Korea			League		KFA Cup		League Cup		Total	
2007	Ulsan Mipo Dolphins	National League	21	13	2	1	-		23	14
2008	Ulsan Mipo Dolphins	National League	27	6	2	0	-		29	6
2009	Gangwon FC	K League 1	20	1	1	0	1	0	22	1
2010	Gangwon FC	K League 1	23	5	1	0	3	0	27	5
2011	Gwangju FC	K League 1	21	2	1	0	1	0	23	2
Career total			112	27	7	1	5	0	124	28

== Honours ==
=== Club ===
Ulsan Hyundai Mipo Dockyard

- Korea National League (2) : 2007, 2008
- Korean President's Cup (1) : 2008
