= Kim Tae-ho (footballer) =

South Korean footballer

Kim Tae-Ho
Personal information
- Full name: Kim Tae-Ho
- Date of birth: 22 September 1989 (age 37)
- Place of birth: South Korea
- Height: 1.82 m (5 ft 11 1/2 in)
- Position: Full back

Team information
- Current team: East Coast Bays
- Number: 12

Youth career
- 2009–2012: Ajou University

Senior career*
Years	Team	Apps	(Gls)
2013–2015	Jeonnam Dragons	64	(0)
2016–2019	FC Anyang	55	(0)
2019–2020	Incheon United	0	(0)
2023	East Coast Bays	0	(0)
- * Club domestic league appearances and goals as of 1 January 2019

Kim Tae-Ho (Korean: 김태호; born 22 September 1989) is a South Korean footballer who plays as full back and center back for East Coast Bays in the NRFL Championship.

== Career ==
He was selected by Chunnam Dragons in the 2013 K League draft. He made his debut in the league match against Daegu FC on 10 March 2013.
