= Lee Yun-eui =

South Korean footballer (born 1987)

Personal information
- Date of birth: 25 July 1987 (age 39)
- Place of birth: South Korea
- Height: 1.80 m (5 ft 11 in)
- Position: Defender

Team information
- Current team: Bucheon FC 1995
- Number: 2

Youth career
- Kwangwoon University

Senior career*
Years	Team	Apps	(Gls)
2010–2012	Gangwon FC	4	(0)
2011–2012	→ Sangju Sangmu Phoenix (army)	4	(0)
2013–	Bucheon FC 1995	21	(2)
- * Club domestic league appearances and goals as of 19 December 2013

Lee Yun-eui (Korean: 이윤의; born 25 July 1987) was a South Korean footballer who last played as a defender for Bucheon FC in the K League in 2013.
