= Kim Young-hoo =

South Korean footballer (born 1983)

Kim Young-Hoo 김영후
Personal information
- Date of birth: March 11, 1983 (age 43)
- Place of birth: Seoul, South Korea
- Height: 1.83 m (6 ft 0 in)
- Position: Forward

Youth career
- 2002–2005: Soongsil University

Senior career*
| Years | Team | Apps | (Gls) |
| 2006–2008 | Ulsan Hyundai Mipo Dolphin | 63 | (60) |
| 2009–2014 | Gangwon FC | 112 | (35) |
| 2012–2013 | → Police (Military service) | 37 | (21) |
| 2015 | Shenzhen Ruby | 13 | (4) |
| 2016 | FC Anyang | 20 | (3) |
| 2017 | Gyeongju KHNP FC | 9 | (3) |
| 2018 | Cheongju City FC | 16 | (4) |
| Total | | 270 | (130) |
- * Club domestic league appearances and goals as of 31 December 2018

- Kim Young-hoo
- Hangul: 김영후
- Hanja: 金泳厚
- RR: Gim Yeonghu
- MR: Kim Yŏnghu

Kim Young-Hoo (Korean: 김영후; born March 11, 1983) is a South Korean footballer who plays as a striker.

Kim began his career at Korea National League side Ulsan Hyundai Mipo Dockyard. He won the National League top scorer in his first season. After two seasons in Ulsan he won the second National League top scorer with 31 goals.

On November 18, 2008, Kim was as one of sixteen priority member, join Gangwon FC. So from 2009, He moved to newly formed Gangwon FC as founding member with former Ulsan Hyundai Mipo Dockyard manager Choi Soon-Ho.

In January 2019, Kim retired from playing football.

== Club career ==
=== Ulsan Hyundai Mipo Dolphin ===
Originally, Kim applied for 2006 K-League draft, but he wasn't nominated by any team. So, Kim started his career at Ulsan Hyundai Mipo Dolphin, a National league side as a rookie. In 2006 season, which was his first season as a professional, he won the Rookie of the Year and the top scorer with 19 goals.

He missed half of 2007 season through injury. Nonetheless injury, he scored 10 goals in 14 games. In 2007 Korea National League Championship playoff second leg, Ulsan Mipo secured league winner by his two goals. Kim won the MVP of championship playoff.

2008 season was best season in his National League career. Kim won his second top scorer title by 31 goals. It was 1.97 goal ratio per games. He made the biggest impact in 2008 season, so Ulsan's manager Choi Soon-Ho took him and some of his teammates to Gangwon FC, a newly formed football club.

=== Gangwon FC ===
Kim became K-Leaguer as he joined Gangwon FC. In his first K-League game against Jeju United he assisted Gangwon's winning goal scored by Yoon Jun-Ha. A 3–3 draw with Chunnam Dragons, saw his first goal and second goal in K-League on April 12, 2009. From June he scored 9 goals in 9 consecutive games. He was also selected K-League all-star due to his good performance. He is nominated 2009 K-League Rookie of the Year. He had three assists in the match against Jeonbuk Hyundai Motors on September 10, 2010.

=== Police ===
After 2011 season, Kim went to Police for military duty. He returned to Gangwon at the end of the 2013 season.

== Club career statistics ==
As of 31 December 2018

| Club performance | | | League | | Cup | | League Cup | | Total | |
| Season | Club | League | Apps | Goals | Apps | Goals | Apps | Goals | Apps | Goals |
| South Korea | | | League | | KFA Cup | | League Cup | | Total | |
|---|---|---|---|---|---|---|---|---|---|---|
| 2006 | Ulsan Hyundai Mipo Dockyard | Korea National League | 20 | 19 | 2 | 1 | 5 | 3 | 27 | 23 |
| 2007 | Ulsan Hyundai Mipo Dockyard | Korea National League | 14 | 10 | 0 | 0 | 0 | 0 | 14 | 10 |
| 2008 | Ulsan Hyundai Mipo Dockyard | Korea National League | 29 | 31 | 2 | 1 | 3 | 1 | 34 | 33 |
| 2009 | Gangwon FC | K-League | 27 | 13 | 1 | 0 | 3 | 0 | 31 | 13 |
| 2010 | Gangwon FC | K-League | 28 | 13 | 1 | 0 | 4 | 1 | 33 | 14 |
| 2011 | Gangwon FC | K-League | 28 | 4 | 1 | 0 | 3 | 2 | 32 | 6 |
| 2012 | Police FC/ Ansan Mugunghwa FC | R-League | 14 | 11 | 2 | 2 | - | | 16 | 13 |
| 2013 | Police FC/ Ansan Mugunghwa FC | K League Challenge | 23 | 10 | 1 | 1 | - | | 24 | 11 |
| 2013 | Gangwon FC | K League Classic | 6 | 1 | - | | - | | 6 | 1 |
| 2014 | Gangwon FC | K League Challenge | 23 | 4 | 2 | 1 | - | | 25 | 5 |
| China | | | League | | CFA Cup | | League Cup | | Total | |
| 2015 | Shenzhen Ruby | China League One | 13 | 4 | 0 | 0 | - | | 13 | 4 |
| South Korea | | | League | | KFA Cup | | League Cup | | Total | |
| 2016 | FC Anyang | K League Challenge | 20 | 3 | 1 | 1 | - | | 21 | 4 |
| 2017 | Gyeongju KHNP FC | Korea National League | 9 | 3 | 1 | 0 | 0 | 0 | 10 | 3 |
| 2018 | Cheongju City FC | K3 League Advanced | 16 | 4 | 1 | 0 | - | | 17 | 4 |
| Career total | | | 270 | 130 | 15 | 7 | 18 | 7 | 303 | 144 |

Note 1: 2013 season's appearance in Gangwon is including 1 game of Relegation Play-off.
Note 2: League Cup included Korean League Cup, Korea National League Championship.

== Honours ==
Ulsan Hyundai Mipo Dockyard

- Korea National League: 2007, 2008
- Korean President's Cup: 2008
- K2 League Cup runner-up: 2006

Individual

- Korea National League Rookie of the Year: 2006
- Korea National League Top scorer: 2006 (19 goals), 2008 (31 goals)
- Korea National League Championship playoff MVP: 2007
- Windsor Awards Best Eleven: 2008
- K-League All-Star: 2009
- K-League Rookie of the Year: 2009

Awards
| Preceded by (South Korea) Kim Han-Won | National League Top Scorer; 2006 | Succeeded by (South Korea) Lim Ho |
| Preceded by (South Korea) Lim Ho | National League Top Scorer; 2008 | Succeeded by (South Korea) Lee Yong-Seung |
