= Lee Dong-hyun (footballer) =

South Korean footballer (born 1989)

Personal information
- Full name: Lee Dong-hyun
- Date of birth: November 19, 1989 (age 36)
- Place of birth: South Korea
- Height: 1.86 m (6 ft 1 in)
- Position: Forward

Team information
- Current team: FC Anyang
- Number: 9

Youth career
- 2008–2009: Kyunghee University

Senior career*
Years	Team	Apps	(Gls)
2010	Gangwon FC	3	(0)
2011–2012	Gangneung City FC	47	(11)
2013	Daejeon Citizen	27	(3)
2014	→ Ulsan Hyundai Mipo (loan)	15	(5)
2015–	FC Anyang	12	(1)
- * Club domestic league appearances and goals as of 15 December 2015

- Lee Dong-hyun
- Hangul: 이동현
- Hanja: 李東炫
- RR: I Donghyeon
- MR: I Tonghyŏn

Lee Dong-hyun (Korean: 이동현, born 19 November 1989) is a South Korean football player who plays as a forward for South Korean club that K League Challenge side FC Anyang.

== Club career ==
On 17 November 2009, Gangwon called him as 4th order at 2010 K-League Draft. His first K-League match was against Daegu FC in Daegu that draw by 2–2 in away game by substitute on 2 May 2010. Since 2011, he move to Korea National League side Gangneung City FC in the same city.

=== Statistics ===
As of 10 November 2012

Club performance			League		Cup		League Cup		Total	
Season	Club	League	Apps	Goals	Apps	Goals	Apps	Goals	Apps	Goals
South Korea			League		KFA Cup		League Cup		Total	
2010	Gangwon FC	K-League	3	0	0	0	2	0	5	0
2011	Gangneung City FC	Korea National League	21	4	0	0	-		21	4
2012	Gangneung City FC	Korea National League	26	7	0	0	-		26	7
Career total			50	11	0	0	2	0	52	11
