= Kim Bong-kyum =

South Korean footballer (born 1984)

Kim Bong-Kyum
Personal information
- Full name: Kim Bong-Kyum
- Date of birth: 1 May 1984 (age 42)
- Place of birth: South Korea
- Height: 1.77 m (5 ft 10 in)
- Position: Defender

Youth career
- 2003–2006: Korea University

Senior career*
Years	Team	Apps	(Gls)
2007–2008	Ulsan Hyundai Mipo Dockyard	48	(8)
2009–2010	Gangwon FC	23	(2)
2011	Ulsan Hyundai Mipo Dockyard	2	(0)
- * Club domestic league appearances and goals as of 26 September 2010

- Kim Bong-kyum
- Hangul: 김봉겸
- Hanja: 金奉兼
- RR: Gim Bonggyeom
- MR: Kim Ponggyŏm

Kim Bong-Kyum (Korean: 김봉겸; Hanja: 金奉兼, born 1 May 1984) is a South Korean football player.

== Club career ==
In 2007, he joined Korea National League side Ulsan Hyundai Mipo Dockyard.

On 18 November 2008, Kim, as one of sixteen priority members, joined newly established club Gangwon FC under former Ulsan Hyundai Mipo Dockyard manager Choi Soon-Ho as a foundation player. The club was making its debut for the 2009 K-League season. He scored his first and second goals in the same match against Seongnam on 21 June 2009. Kim made regular appearances throughout 2009 for Gangwon, but saw less game time the following year.

Leaving Gangwon at the conclusion of the 2010 K-League season, Kim dropped down to the National League, in a return to former club Ulsan Hyundai Mipo Dockyard.

== Club career statistics ==
As of 26 September 2010

Club performance			League		Cup		League Cup		Total	
Season	Club	League	Apps	Goals	Apps	Goals	Apps	Goals	Apps	Goals
South Korea			League		KFA Cup		League Cup		Total	
2007	Ulsan Mipo Dolphins	National League	20	1	2	0	-		22	1
2008	Ulsan Mipo Dolphins	National League	28	7	2	0	-		30	7
2009	Gangwon FC	K-League	15	2	1	0	2	0	18	2
2010	Gangwon FC	K-League	8	0	0	0	1	0	9	0
Total	South Korea		71	10	5	0	3	0	79	10
Career total			71	10	5	0	3	0	79	10

== Honours ==
=== Club ===
Ulsan Hyundai Mipo Dockyard

- Korea National League (2) : 2007, 2008
- Korean President's Cup (1) : 2008
