= Ha Jae-hoon (footballer, born 1984) =

South Korean footballer (born 1984)

Ha Jae-Hoon
Personal information
- Full name: Ha Jae-Hoon (하재훈)
- Date of birth: October 3, 1984 (age 42)
- Place of birth: South Korea
- Height: 1.81 m (5 ft 11 in)
- Position: Defender

Team information
- Current team: Changwon City FC
- Number: 12

Youth career
- 2003–2006: Dongguk University

Senior career*
| Years | Team | Apps | (Gls) |
| 2007–2008 | Changwon City FC | 44 | (0) |
| 2009–2010 | Gangwon FC | 25 | (0) |
| 2011– | Changwon City FC | | |
- * Club domestic league appearances and goals as of 13 March 2011

Ha Jae-Hoon (Korean: 하재훈; Hanja: 河在勳, born October 3, 1984) is a South Korean football player who, as of 2011 is playing for Changwon City FC.

He was played at Korea National League side Changwon City FC since 2007 to 2008. He was played 44 games and four assists for Changwon.

== Club career statistics ==
As of 13 March 2011

| Club performance | | | League | | Cup | | League Cup | | Total | |
| Season | Club | League | Apps | Goals | Apps | Goals | Apps | Goals | Apps | Goals |
| South Korea | | | League | | KFA Cup | | League Cup | | Total | |
|---|---|---|---|---|---|---|---|---|---|---|
| 2007 | Changwon City | National League | 20 | 0 | 1 | 0 | - | | 21 | 0 |
| 2008 | Changwon City | National League | 24 | 0 | 2 | 0 | - | | 26 | 0 |
| 2009 | Gangwon FC | K-League | 16 | 0 | 1 | 0 | 2 | 0 | 19 | 0 |
| 2010 | Gangwon FC | K-League | 9 | 0 | 1 | 0 | 2 | 0 | 12 | 0 |
| 2011 | Changwon City | National League | | | | | - | | | |
| Total | South Korea | | 69 | 0 | 5 | 0 | 4 | 0 | 78 | 0 |
| Career total | | | 69 | 0 | 5 | 0 | 4 | 0 | 78 | 0 |
