= Ha Jung-heon =

South Korean footballer

Ha Jung-Heon
Personal information
- Full name: Ha Jung-Heon (하정헌)
- Date of birth: October 14, 1987 (age 39)
- Place of birth: South Korea
- Height: 1.79 m (5 ft 10 1/2 in)
- Position: Forward

Team information
- Current team: Ansan Mugunghwa
- Number: 12

Youth career
- 2006–2008: Woosuk University

Senior career*
Years	Team	Apps	(Gls)
2008–2009	Suwon City	32	(17)
2010–2011	Gangwon FC	17	(2)
2012	Goyang KB	23	(6)
2013–	Suwon FC	30	(6)
2015–	→ Ansan Mugunghwa (army)	19	(2)
- * Club domestic league appearances and goals as of 1 November 2016

- Ha Jung-heon
- Hangul: 하정헌
- Hanja: 河廷憲
- RR: Ha Jeongheon
- MR: Ha Chŏnghŏn

Ha Jung-Heon (Korean: 하정헌; Hanja: 河廷憲, born 14 October 1987) is a South Korean football player who plays as a forward for Ansan Mugunghwa.

He started his career at Korea National League side Ansan Police. On 17 November 2009, K-League side Gangwon FC called him as sixth order at 2010 K-League Draft. His first K-League match was against FC Seoul in Gangneung, that Gangwon lost by 0–3 in the first home game of the 2010 season on 6 March 2010.

== Club career statistics ==
As of 31 October 2011

Club performance			League		Cup		League Cup		Total	
Season	Club	League	Apps	Goals	Apps	Goals	Apps	Goals	Apps	Goals
South Korea			League		KFA Cup		League Cup		Total	
2008	Suwon City	Korea National League	15	11	0	0	-		15	11
2009	Suwon City	Korea National League	17	6	1	0	-		18	6
2010	Gangwon FC	K-League	13	2	1	0	4	0	18	2
2011	Gangwon FC	K-League	4	0	0	0	1	1	5	1
Career total			49	19	2	0	5	1	56	20

Note: appearances and goals include championship playoffs.
