= Jung Chul-woon =

South Korean footballer

Jung Chul-Woon
Personal information
- Full name: Jung Chul-Woon (정철운)
- Date of birth: July 30, 1986 (age 40)
- Place of birth: South Korea
- Height: 1.87 m (6 ft 2 in)
- Position: Defender

Youth career
- 2005–2008: Kwangwoon University

Senior career*
Years	Team	Apps	(Gls)
2009–2010	Gangwon FC	10	(0)
2011–2012	Daejeon KHNP	6	(0)
2013	Pattaya United	5	(0)
2014	Chiangmai F.C		
- * Club domestic league appearances and goals as of 7 July 2013

Jung Chul-Woon (Korean: 정철운, born July 30, 1986) is a South Korean football player who currently plays as a centre back, for Thai Premier League side Pattaya United. His previous clubs are K-League club Gangwon FC and Korea National League side Daejeon Korea Hydro & Nuclear Power FC.

On November 18, 2008, he was one of sixteen priority members to join Gangwon FC. He made his debut for Gangwon against Daegu FC on April 8, 2009, in league cup match. His first league match for Gangwon against FC Seoul on July 19, 2009, by substitute for teammate Lee Se-In.

== Club career statistics ==
As of 10 September 2010

Club performance			League		Cup		League Cup		Total	
Season	Club	League	Apps	Goals	Apps	Goals	Apps	Goals	Apps	Goals
South Korea			League		KFA Cup		League Cup		Total	
2009	Gangwon FC	K-League	3	0	2	0	3	0	8	0
2010	Gangwon FC	K-League	7	0	1	0	4	0	12	0
Total	South Korea		10	0	3	0	7	0	20	0
Career total			10	0	3	0	7	0	20	0
