= Renato Medeiros =

Brazilian footballer

Personal information
- Full name: Renato Medeiros de Almeida
- Date of birth: 4 February 1982 (age 44)
- Place of birth: Brasília, Brazil
- Height: 5 ft 7 in (1.70 m)
- Position: Midfielder

Team information
- Current team: São Raimundo

Senior career*
Years	Team	Apps	(Gls)
1996–2002	São Paulo		
2003	Portuguesa Santista		
2004–2005	Ponte Preta		
2006–2007	Muscat		
2007–2009	Sanat Naft		
2010	Canoas SC	3	(0)
2010	Gangwon FC	4	(0)
2011–	São Raimundo		
- * Club domestic league appearances and goals as of 13 February 2011 (UTC)

Renato Medeiros de Almeida (commonly known as Renato Medeiros, born 4 February 1982 in Brasília) is a Brazilian football midfielder who currently plays for São Raimundo.
