= Hwang Kyeong-tae =

South Korean baseball player

- Infielder
- Born: August 17, 1996 (age 28); Daegu, South Korea
- Batted: Right Threw: Right

KBO debut
- July 19, 2017, for the Doosan Bears

Last KBO appearance
- April 18, 2021, for the Doosan Bears

KBO statistics
- Batting average: .214
- Home runs: 0
- Runs batted in: 0

Teams
- Doosan Bears (2017–2021)

Hwang Kyeong-tae (Korean: 황경태; born August 17, 1996) is a South Korean professional baseball infielder who played for the Doosan Bears of the KBO League. His major position is shortstop, however, he sometimes plays as second baseman or third baseman. He graduated from Daegu Sangwon High School and was selected for the Doosan Bears by a draft in 2016 (2nd draft, 2nd round).
