= Kim Chang-hee (footballer, born 1987) =

South Korean footballer (born 1987)

Kim Chang-Hee
Personal information
- Full name: Kim Chang-Hee (김창희)
- Date of birth: June 8, 1987 (age 39)
- Place of birth: South Korea
- Height: 1.79 m (5 ft 10 1/2 in)
- Position: Midfielder

Team information
- Current team: Daejeon Korail FC
- Number: 27

Youth career
- 2006–2009: Yeungnam University

Senior career*
| Years | Team | Apps | (Gls) |
| 2010 | Gangwon FC | 8 | (0) |
| 2011 | Gangneung City | 24 | (2) |
| 2012 | Daejeon KHNP | 12 | (0) |

International career^{‡}
| 2005 | South Korea U-20 | 1 | (0) |
- * Club domestic league appearances and goals as of 25 May 2012 ‡ National team caps and goals as of 28 March 2010

- Kim Chang-hee
- Hangul: 김창희
- Hanja: 金昌希
- RR: Gim Changhui
- MR: Kim Ch'anghŭi

Kim Chang-Hee (Korean: 김창희; Hanja: 金昌希, born 8 June 1987) is a South Korean football player who plays as a midfielder.

== Club career ==
Kim spent his formative football years playing at university level for Yeungnam University. Nominating himself for the 2010 K-League draft, he wasn't selected by any K-League clubs. However, Kim joined Gangwon FC late in the preseason. His first K-League match was against Chunnam Dragons in Gangneung on 28 March 2010, resulting in a handy win 5 -2 for his club. Despite starting a number of matches for Gangwon in the first half of the season, he gradually fell out of favour and was eventually released by the club in January 2011. Chang subsequently dropped down to the next tier of Korean football, the Korea National League, with a move to Gangneung City FC.

== Club career statistics ==
As of 25 May 2011

| Club performance | | | League | | Cup | | League Cup | | Total | |
| Season | Club | League | Apps | Goals | Apps | Goals | Apps | Goals | Apps | Goals |
| South Korea | | | League | | KFA Cup | | League Cup | | Total | |
|---|---|---|---|---|---|---|---|---|---|---|
| 2010 | Gangwon FC | K-League | 8 | 0 | 0 | 0 | 2 | 0 | 10 | 0 |
| 2011 | Gangneung City FC | National League | 24 | 2 | 0 | 0 | 0 | 0 | 24 | 2 |
| Career total | | | 32 | 2 | 0 | 0 | 2 | 0 | 34 | 2 |

== International career ==
Kim was a member of the South Korea national under-20 football team in the Niigata International Youth Friendly Tournament. He played two games in this tournament, but only one of these constituted a full youth international match.
