= Jeon Won-keun =

South Korean footballer (born 1986)

Jeon Won-Keun
Personal information
- Full name: Jeon Won-Keun
- Date of birth: 13 November 1986 (age 39)
- Place of birth: South Korea
- Height: 1.77 m (5 ft 10 in)
- Position: Defender

Team information
- Current team: Yongin City
- Number: 13

Youth career
- 2005–2008: Korea University

Senior career*
Years	Team	Apps	(Gls)
2009	Gangwon FC	26	(1)
2010–2011	Daegu FC	3	(0)
2011	Gyeongnam FC	0	(0)
2012	Ulsan Hyundai Mipo	23	(2)
2013–	Yongin City	2	(0)
- * Club domestic league appearances and goals as of 7 July 2013

- Jeon Won-keun
- Hangul: 전원근
- Hanja: 全源根
- RR: Jeon Wongeun
- MR: Chŏn Wŏn'gŭn

Jeon Won-Keun (Korean: 전원근, born 13 November 1986) is a South Korean football player.

== Club career ==
Gangwon FC called upon Jeon as their first pick in the 2009 K-League Draft. He quickly established himself in the first team, playing in all but two of Gangwon's league matches in 2009. At the end of the 2009 playing season, on 30 November 2009, he moved to Daegu FC. He saw little on field action during the 2010 season, making only three appearances with the senior squad. On 2 August 2011, he moved to K-League rivals Gyeongnam FC.

== Club career statistics ==
As of 5 November 2011

Club performance			League		Cup		League Cup		Total	
Season	Club	League	Apps	Goals	Apps	Goals	Apps	Goals	Apps	Goals
South Korea			League		KFA Cup		League Cup		Total	
2009	Gangwon FC	K-League	26	1	0	0	2	0	28	1
2010	Daegu FC	K-League	3	0	0	0	0	0	3	0
2011	Daegu FC	K-League	0	0	0	0	0	0	0	0
2011	Gyeongnam FC	K-League	0	0	0	0	0	0	0	0
Career total			29	1	0	0	2	0	31	1
