= Kwon Kyung-ho =

South Korean footballer

Kwon Kyung-Ho
Personal information
- Full name: Kwon Kyung-Ho (권경호)
- Date of birth: July 12, 1986 (age 40)
- Place of birth: South Korea
- Height: 1.77 m (5 ft 9 1/2 in)
- Position: Midfielder

Team information
- Current team: Goyang Kookmin Bank
- Number: 29

Youth career
- 2005–2008: Dongguk University

Senior career*
Years	Team	Apps	(Gls)
2009	Gangwon FC	1	(0)
2010–	Goyang Kookmin Bank	0	(0)
- * Club domestic league appearances and goals as of 1 March 2010

Kwon Kyung-Ho (Korean: 권경호, born July 12, 1986) is a South Korean football player who, as of 2010 is playing for Korea National League side Goyang Kookmin Bank. His previous club is Gangwon FC.

On November 18, 2008, he was one of sixteen priority members to join Gangwon FC. He made his debut for Gangwon against Daegu FC on April 8, 2009 in league cup match. His first league match was against Seongnam by substitute on 21 June 2009. From 2010 season, he joined Korea National League side Goyang Kookmin Bank.

== Club career statistics ==
As of 1 March 2010

Club performance			League		Cup		League Cup		Total	
Season	Club	League	Apps	Goals	Apps	Goals	Apps	Goals	Apps	Goals
South Korea			League		KFA Cup		League Cup		Total	
2009	Gangwon FC	K-League	1	0	1	0	2	0	4	0
2010	Goyang Kookmin Bank	Korea National League	0	0	0	0	-		0	0
Total	South Korea		1	0	1	0	2	0	4	0
Career total			1	0	1	0	2	0	4	0
