= Kim Geun-bae =

South Korean footballer

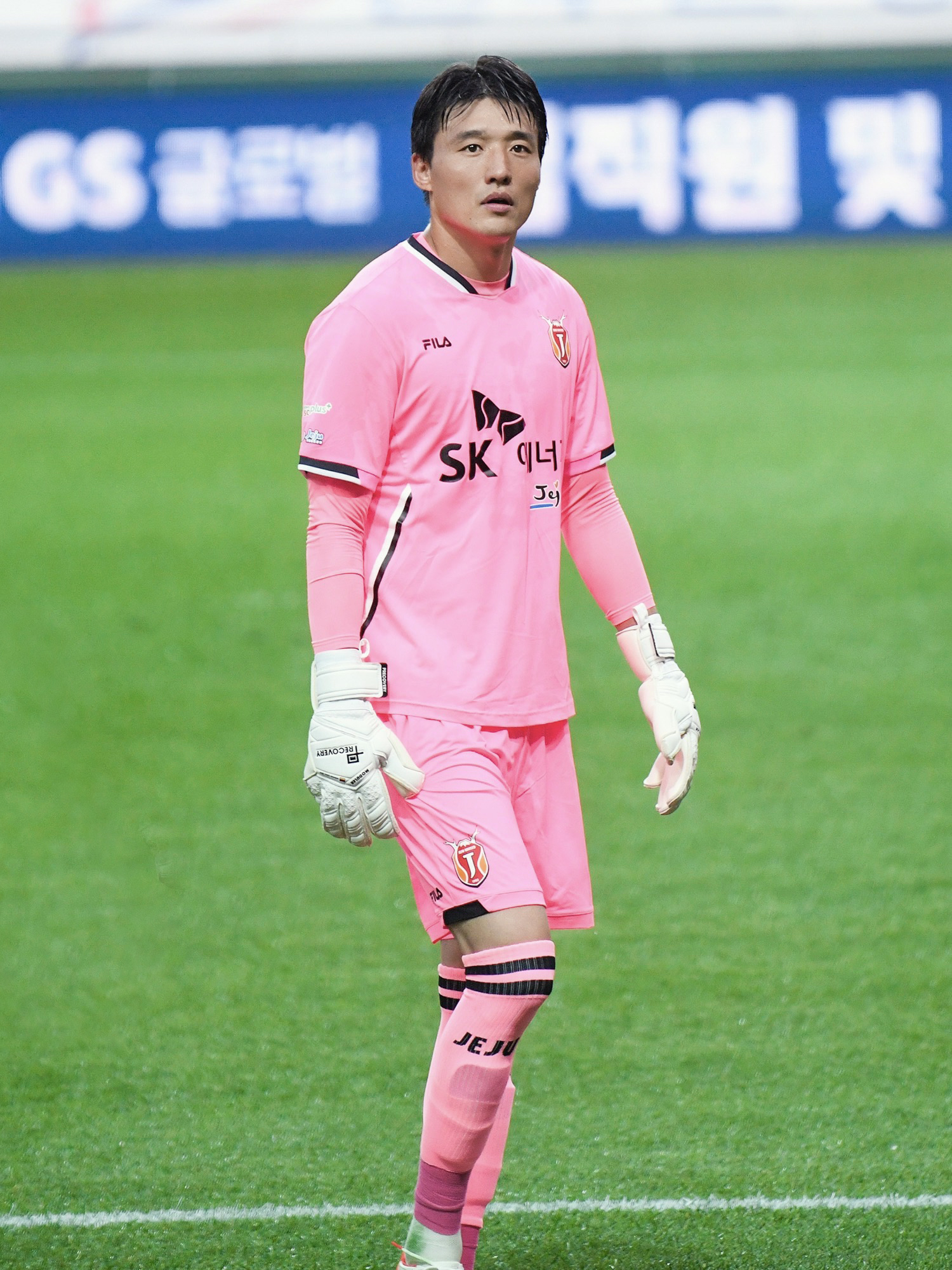
- Kim in August 2022

Personal information
- Date of birth: August 7, 1986 (age 40)
- Place of birth: South Korea
- Height: 1.87 m (6 ft 1 1/2 in)
- Position: Goalkeeper

Team information
- Current team: Jeju United
- Number: 41

Youth career
- 2005–2008: Korea University

Senior career*
Years	Team	Apps	(Gls)
2009–2015	Gangwon FC	58	(0)
2014–2015	→ Sangju Sangmu (army)	25	(0)
2016–2021	Seongnam FC	35	(0)
2020	→ Daejeon Hana Citizen (loan)	9	(0)
2022–2023	Gimpo FC	0	(0)
2022–2023	→ Jeju United (loan)	6	(0)
2024–	→ Jeju United	0	(0)

International career^{‡}
2002	South Korea U-17		
- * Club domestic league appearances and goals as of July 15, 2022 ‡ National team caps and goals as of April 8, 2009

Kim Geun-bae (Korean: 김근배, born August 7, 1986) is a South Korean football goalkeeper who plays for Jeju United.

On November 18, 2008, Kim was as one of sixteen priority member, he joined Gangwon FC. He made his debut for Gangwon against Daegu FC on April 8, 2009, in league cup match. His first league match for Gangwon against Suwon Bluewings on September 6, 2009.

== Club statistics ==
As of 11 November 2023

Club	Season	League			Cup		League Cup		Other		Total	
Club	Season	Division	Apps	Goals	Apps	Goals	Apps	Goals	Apps	Goals	Apps	Goals
Gangwon FC	2009	K League 1	1	0	0	0	3	0	-		4	0
Gangwon FC	2010	K League 1	6	0	0	0	0	0	-		6	0
Gangwon FC	2011	K League 1	8	0	0	0	4	0	-		12	0
Gangwon FC	2012	K League 1	18	0	1	0	-		-		19	0
Gangwon FC	2013	K League 1	23	0	2	0	-		2	0	27	0
Gangwon FC	2015	K League 2	3	0	-		-		-		3	0
Gangwon FC	Total		59	0	3	0	7	0	2	0	71	0
Sangju Sangmu (army)	2014	K League 1	5	0	0	0	-		-		5	0
Sangju Sangmu (army)	2015	K League 2	20	0	0	0	-		-		20	0
Sangju Sangmu (army)	Total		25	0	0	0	0	0	0	0	25	0
Seongnam FC	2016	K League 1	9	0	2	0	-		1	0	12	0
Seongnam FC	2018	K League 2	23	0	1	0	-		-		24	0
Seongnam FC	2019	K League 1	2	0	1	0	-		-		3	0
Seongnam FC	2020	K League 1	0	0	-		-		-		0	0
Seongnam FC	2021	K League 1	0	0	2	0	-		-		2	0
Seongnam FC	Total		34	0	6	0	0	0	1	0	41	0
Daejeon Hana Citizen (loan)	2020	K League 2	9	0	1	0	-		-		10	0
Gimpo FC	2022	K League 2	0	0	1	0	-		-		1	0
Jeju United (loan)	2022	K League 1	4	0	-		-		-		4	0
Jeju United	2023	K League 1	2	0	2	0	-		-		4	0
Jeju United	Total		6	0	2	0	0	0	0	0	8	0
Career total			133	0	13	0	7	0	3	0	156	0
