= Shin Hyun-joon (footballer) =

South Korean footballer

Shin Hyun-Joon
Personal information
- Full name: Shin Hyun-Joon
- Date of birth: April 9, 1983 (age 43)
- Place of birth: South Korea
- Height: 1.77 m (5 ft 9 1/2 in)
- Position: Midfielder

Senior career*
Years	Team	Apps	(Gls)
2003−2004	Gangneung City	7	(0)
2005−2007	Seosan Omega	38	(1)
2008	Daejeon KHNP	12	(0)
2009	Cheonan City	13	(1)
2009–2010	PSM Makassar	18	(2)
2010−2011	PSPS Pekanbaru	26	(4)
2011−2012	Deltras Sidoarjo	16	(3)
2012− 2013	PSMS Medan	14	(2)
2014–2015	Putrajaya SPA	20	(0)
- * Club domestic league appearances and goals as of January 07, 2015

Shin Hyun Joon (born April 9, 1983 in South Korea) is a South Korean former footballer who plays as a midfielder.

== Club career ==
He started his senior career in Gangneung City for 2003 season.
