= Kang Yong =

South Korean footballer (born 1979)

Personal information
- Full name: Kang Yong (강용)
- Date of birth: January 14, 1979 (age 47)
- Place of birth: South Korea
- Height: 1.78 m (5 ft 10 in)
- Position: Defender

Team information
- Current team: Daegu FC
- Number: 3

Youth career
- Korea University

Senior career*
Years	Team	Apps	(Gls)
2001–2004	Pohang Steelers	59	(2)
2005	Chunnam Dragons	6	(0)
2006–2007	Gwangju Sangmu	35	(4)
2008–2010	Chunnam Dragons	0	(0)
2009	→ Gangwon FC (loan)	13	(0)
2011–	Daegu FC	19	(1)
- * Club domestic league appearances and goals as of 18 December 2012

Kang Yong (Korean: 강용; Hanja: 康甬; born January 14, 1979) is a South Korean football player who since 2008 has played for Chunnam Dragons. He formerly played for Pohang Steelers and Gwangju Sangmu Bulsajo.

From 2009, he was loaned to Gangwon FC for one year. In July 2011, he joined Daegu FC.

== Honours ==
=== Club ===
Pohang Steelers

- K-League
  - Runner-up (1) : 2004
- Korean FA Cup
  - Runner-up (2) : 2001, 2002

== Club career statistics ==
As of 5 November 2011

Club performance			League		Cup		League Cup		Continental		Total	
Season	Club	League	Apps	Goals	Apps	Goals	Apps	Goals	Apps	Goals	Apps	Goals
South Korea			League		KFA Cup		League Cup		Asia		Total	
2001	Pohang Steelers	K-League	2	0			8	0	-			
2002	Pohang Steelers	K-League	0	0			7	0	-			
2003	Pohang Steelers	K-League	37	2	3	0	-		-		40	2
2004	Pohang Steelers	K-League	20	0	0	0	11	1	-		31	1
2005	Chunnam Dragons	K-League	6	0	0	0	6	0	-		12	0
2006	Gwangju Sangmu	K-League	16	4	2	0	9	0	-		27	4
2007	Gwangju Sangmu	K-League	19	0	1	0	7	0	-		27	0
2008	Chunnam Dragons	K-League	0	0	0	0	0	0	1	0	1	0
2009	Gangwon FC	K-League	13	0	0	0	1	0	-		14	0
2011	Daegu FC	K-League	9	0	0	0	0	0	-		9	0
Career total			122	6	6	0	49	1	1	0	178	7

Sporting positions
Preceded by	Gwangju Sangmu Phoenix captain 2007	Succeeded by
