= Chu Jung-hyun =

South Korean footballer

Chu Jung-Hyun
Personal information
- Full name: Chu Jung-Hyun (추정현)
- Date of birth: January 28, 1988 (age 38)
- Place of birth: South Korea
- Height: 1.72 m (5 ft 7 1/2 in)
- Position: Midfielder

Team information
- Current team: Mokpo City
- Number: 11

Youth career
- 2003–2005: Iri High School
- 2004–2005: → FC Metz (KFA Youth Project)
- 2006–2008: Myongji University

Senior career*
Years	Team	Apps	(Gls)
2009	Gangwon FC	0	(0)
2010–2011	Yongin City FC	48	(3)
2012	Daejeon KHNP	10	(0)
2013–	Mokpo City	4	(0)

International career^{‡}
2002–2004	South Korea U-17	?	(3)
2005–2006	South Korea U-20	7	(2)
- * Club domestic league appearances and goals as of July 7, 2013 ‡ National team caps and goals as of April 8, 2009

Chu Jung-Hyun (Korean: 추정현, born January 28, 1988) is a South Korean football player who currently plays for Korea National League side Mokpo City FC. His previous clubs are K-League side Gangwon FC, National League side Yongin City FC and Daejeon KHNP.

On November 20, 2008, Gangwon was called Chu as extra order at 2009 K-League Draft. He made his debut for Gangwon against Daegu FC by substitute on April 8, 2009 in league cup match. From 2010 season, he joined Korea National League side Yongin City FC.

== Club career statistics ==
As of end of the 2012 season

Club performance			League		Cup		League Cup		Total	
Season	Club	League	Apps	Goals	Apps	Goals	Apps	Goals	Apps	Goals
South Korea			League		KFA Cup		League Cup		Total	
2009	Gangwon FC	K-League	0	0	1	0	2	0	3	0
2010	Yongin City FC	Korea National League	25	2	2	0	-		27	2
2011	Yongin City FC	Korea National League	23	1	1	0	-		24	1
2012	Daejeon KHNP	Korea National League	10	0	0	0	-		10	0
Total	South Korea		58	3	4	0	2	0	64	3
Career total			58	3	4	0	2	0	64	3
