= Moon Joo-won =

South Korean football player (born 1983)

Moon Joo-Won
Personal information
- Full name: Moon Joo-Won (문주원)
- Date of birth: May 8, 1983 (age 43)
- Place of birth: South Korea
- Height: 1.80 m (5 ft 11 in)
- Position: Defensive midfielder

Team information
- Current team: Gyeongnam FC
- Number: 18

Youth career
- Kyunghee University

Senior career*
Years	Team	Apps	(Gls)
2006–2008	Daegu FC	38	(4)
2009	Gangwon FC	9	(0)
2010	Sagan Tosu	3	(0)
2011–2012	Icheon Citizen	0	(0)
2013–	Gyeongnam FC	11	(0)
- * Club domestic league appearances and goals as of 4 December 2014

Moon Joo-Won (born May 8, 1983) is a South Korean football player. He currently plays for Gyeongnam FC

== Club career ==
Moon made his professional debut for Daegu FC, having joined the club for the 2007 season. Moon would stay for three seasons, before transferring to newly formed K-League club Gangwon FC in January 2010.

In January 2011, Moon moved to Japanese club Sagan Tosu, who play in the J2 League. On June 30, 2012, he was released from Sagan Tosu and is now a free agent.

== Club statistics ==
As of June 30, 2010

Club performance			League		Cup		League Cup		Total	
Season	Club	League	Apps	Goals	Apps	Goals	Apps	Goals	Apps	Goals
South Korea			League		KFA Cup		League Cup		Total	
2007	Daegu FC	K-League	10	1	2	0	9	0	21	1
2007	Daegu FC	K-League	12	1	5	0	6	0	23	1
2008	Daegu FC	K-League	18	2	1	0	9	0	28	2
2009	Gangwon FC	K-League	14	0	0	0	3	1	17	1
Japan			League		Emperor's Cup		League Cup		Total	
2010	Sagan Tosu	J2 League	19	1	5	0	-		24	1
Total	South Korea		54	4	8	0	27	1	90	5
Total	Japan		19	1	5	0	-		24	1
Career total			83	5	13	0	27	1	124	5
