= Chung Kyung-ho (footballer) =

South Korean footballer (born 1980)

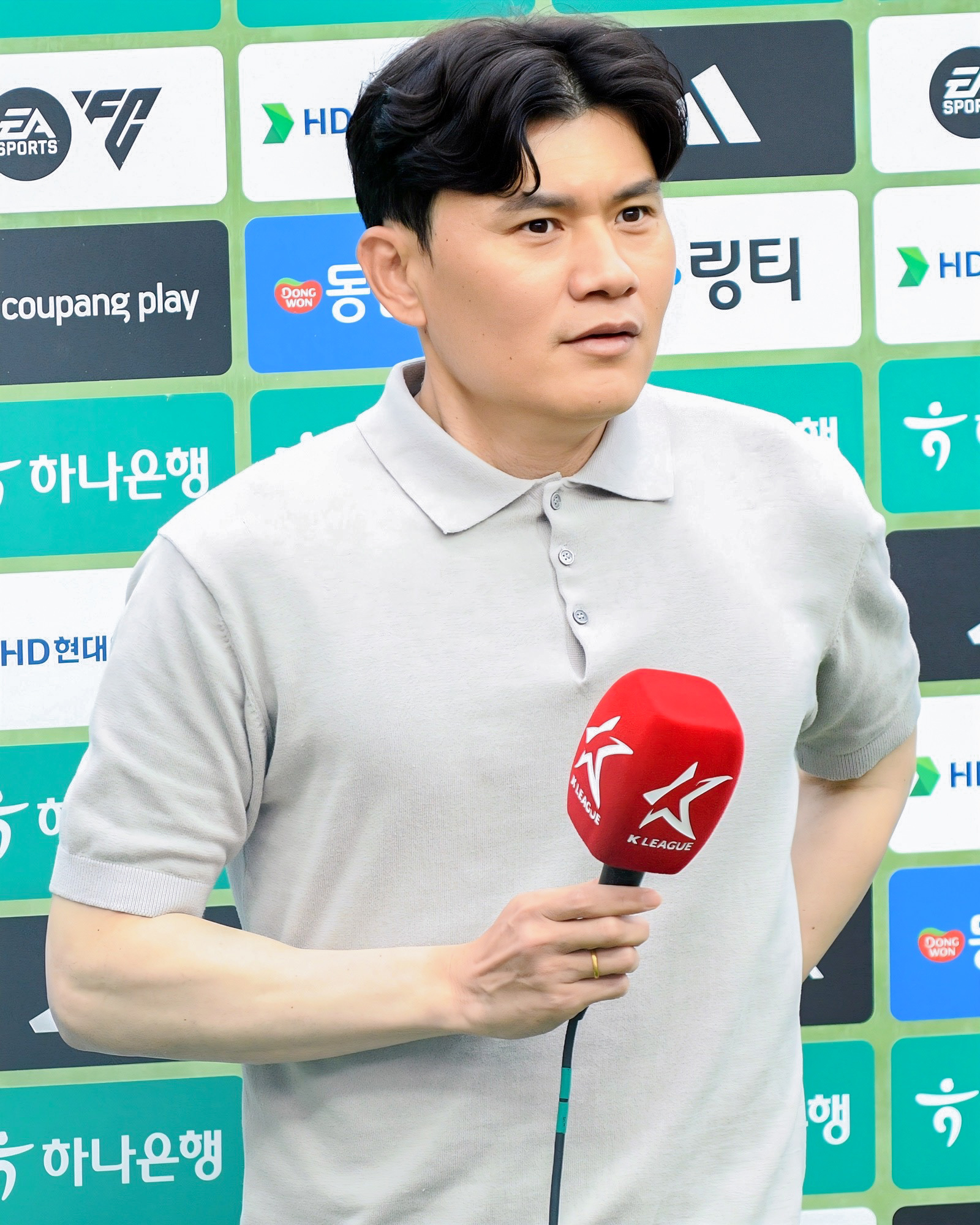
- Chung in 2026

Personal information
- Date of birth: 22 May 1980 (age 46)
- Place of birth: Samcheok, Gangwon, South Korea
- Height: 1.79 m (5 ft 10 1/2 in)
- Position: Left winger

Youth career
- 1996–1998: Gangnung Jeil High School

College career
Years	Team	Apps	(Gls)
1999–2002	University of Ulsan		

Senior career*
Years	Team	Apps	(Gls)
2003–2007	Ulsan Hyundai Horang-i	68	(10)
2004–2006	→ Gwangju Sangmu (draft)	37	(8)
2007–2008	Jeonbuk Hyundai Motors	34	(5)
2009–2011	Gangwon FC	43	(3)
2012	Daejeon Citizen	22	(0)
Total		204	(26)

International career
2004	South Korea U23	4 (Note: Appearances as an overage player in Summer Olympics)	(0)
2003–2006	South Korea	41	(6)
Korean name
Hangul	정경호
Hanja	鄭暻鎬
RR	Jeong Gyeongho
MR	Chŏng Kyŏngho
- * Club domestic league appearances and goals

Chung Kyung-ho (Korean: 정경호; born 22 May 1980) is a former South Korean footballer. He is the currently manager of Gangwon FC. He was in the South Korea national team in the 2004 Summer Olympics and the 2004 AFC Asian Cup. He was also selected for South Korea's squad for the 2006 FIFA World Cup by performing a key role in the qualifiers, but didn't appear in World Cup matches.

== Career statistics ==
=== Club ===
Appearances and goals by club, season and competition
Club	Season	League			National cup		League cup		Continental		Total	
Club	Season	Division	Apps	Goals	Apps	Goals	Apps	Goals	Apps	Goals	Apps	Goals
Ulsan Hyundai Horang-i	2003	K League	38	5	4	0	—		—		42	5
Ulsan Hyundai Horang-i	2004	K League	18	3	0	0	0	0	—		18	3
Ulsan Hyundai Horang-i	2007	K League	12	2	1	0	11	0	—		24	2
Ulsan Hyundai Horang-i	Total		68	10	5	0	11	0	—		84	10
Gwangju Sangmu (draft)	2005	K League	18	4	0	0	9	0	—		27	4
Gwangju Sangmu (draft)	2006	K League	19	4	0	0	0	0	—		19	4
Gwangju Sangmu (draft)	Total		37	8	0	0	9	0	—		46	8
Jeonbuk Hyundai Motors	2007	K League	11	2	0	0	0	0	2	0	13	2
Jeonbuk Hyundai Motors	2008	K League	23	3	0	0	9	2	—		32	5
Jeonbuk Hyundai Motors	Total		34	5	0	0	9	2	2	0	45	7
Gangwon FC	2009	K League	9	0	0	0	2	2	—		11	2
Gangwon FC	2010	K League	24	3	1	0	2	0	—		27	3
Gangwon FC	2011	K League	10	0	1	0	1	0	—		12	0
Gangwon FC	Total		43	3	2	0	5	2	—		50	5
Daejeon Citizen	2012	K League	22	0	3	0	—		—		25	0
Career total			204	26	10	0	34	4	2	0	250	30

=== International ===
Results list South Korea's goal tally first.

List of international goals scored by Chung Kyung-ho
No.	Date	Venue	Opponent	Score	Result	Competition
1	29 September 2003	Incheon, South Korea	Nepal	13–0	16–0	2004 AFC Asian Cup qualification
2	21 October 2003	Muscat, Oman	Oman	1–0	1–3	2004 AFC Asian Cup qualification
3	24 October 2003	Muscat, Oman	Nepal	6–0	7–0	2004 AFC Asian Cup qualification
4	15 January 2005	Los Angeles, United States	Colombia	1–0	1–2	Friendly
5	22 January 2005	Carson, United States	Sweden	1–0	1–1	Friendly
6	8 June 2005	Kuwait City, Kuwait	Kuwait	3–0	4–0	2006 FIFA World Cup qualification

== Honours ==
University of Ulsan

- Korean President's Cup runner-up: 2001

Ulsan Hyundai Horang-i

- Korean League Cup: 2007

== Notes ==
Sporting positions
Preceded by Lee Eul-yong	Gangwon FC captain 2009–2011	Succeeded by Seo Dong-hyeon
