= Stipe Lapić =

Croatian footballer (born 1983)

Personal information
- Full name: Stipe Lapić
- Date of birth: 22 January 1983 (age 43)
- Place of birth: Sinj, SFR Yugoslavia
- Height: 1.86 m (6 ft 1 in)
- Position: Defender

Youth career
- 1995–2001: Hajduk Split
- 2001–2003: PSV

Senior career*
Years	Team	Apps	(Gls)
2003–2004	Dinamo Zagreb	0	(0)
2004	Kuban Krasnodar	0	(0)
2005	SV Pasching	2	(0)
2005–2007	Zimbru Chisinau	32	(0)
2007–2008	Šibenik	26	(1)
2008–2009	Slaven Belupo	18	(1)
2009–2011	Gangwon	32	(2)
2011–2012	NK Zagreb	8	(0)
2012	Yanbian Baekdu Tigers	15	(7)
2013	Chongqing	7	(0)

International career^{‡}
- Croatia U-17
- Croatia U-19
2004	Croatia U-21	1	(0)
- Croatia U-23
- * Club domestic league appearances and goals as of 2013-03-08 ‡ National team caps and goals as of 2013-03-08

Stipe Lapić (Croatian pronunciation: [stǐːpe lǎːpitɕ]; born 22 January 1983, Sinj, Croatia) is a Croatian football player who last played for China League One side Chongqing F.C.

== Club career ==
He played at HNK Hajduk Split and PSV Eindhoven's under-19 team. His first senior team was NK Dinamo Zagreb. From this, he played several team in some countries. He also capped Croatia national under-21 football team.

=== Club career statistics ===
As of 23 May 2011

Club performance			League		Cup		League Cup		Continental		Total	
Season	Club	League	Apps	Goals	Apps	Goals	Apps	Goals	Apps	Goals	Apps	Goals
Croatia			League		Croatian Cup		League Cup		Europe		Total	
2003–04	NK Dinamo Zagreb	Prva HNL	0	0			-		0	0		
Russia			League		Russian Cup		League Cup		Europe		Total	
2004	FC Kuban Krasnodar	Russian Premier League	0	0	1	0	-		-			
Austria			League		Austrian Cup		League Cup		Europe		Total	
2004–05	SV Pasching	Austrian Football Bundesliga	2	0			-		0	0		
Moldova			League		Moldavian Cup		League Cup		Europe		Total	
2005–06	FC Zimbru Chişinău	Moldovan National Division	11	0			-		-			
2006–07	FC Zimbru Chişinău	Moldovan National Division	21	0			-		4	0		
Croatia			League		Croatian Cup		League Cup		Europe		Total	
2007–08	HNK Šibenik	Prva HNL	26	1	2	0	-		-		28	1
2008–09	Slaven Belupo	Prva HNL	18	1	2	0	-		4	0	24	1
2009–10	Slaven Belupo	Prva HNL	0	0	0	0	-		2	0	2	0
South Korea			League		KFA Cup		League Cup		Asia		Total	
2009	Gangwon FC	K-League	11	2	0	0	0	0	-		11	2
2010	Gangwon FC	K-League	20	0	1	0	0	0	-		21	0
2011	Gangwon FC	K-League	1	0	0	0	0	0	-		1	0
Total	Croatia		44	2			-		6	0		
Total	Russia		0	0			-		-			
Total	Austria		2	0			-		0	0		
Total	Moldova		32	0			-		4	0		
Total	South Korea		32	2	1	0	0	0	-		33	2
Career total			110	4			0	0	10	0		

== Honors ==
=== Zimbru Chisinau ===
- Moldovan National Division Runner-up (2) : 2005–06, 2006–07
- Moldavian Cup Winner (1) : 2006–07
