= Kwon Soon-hyung =

South Korean footballer

Kwon Soon-Hyung
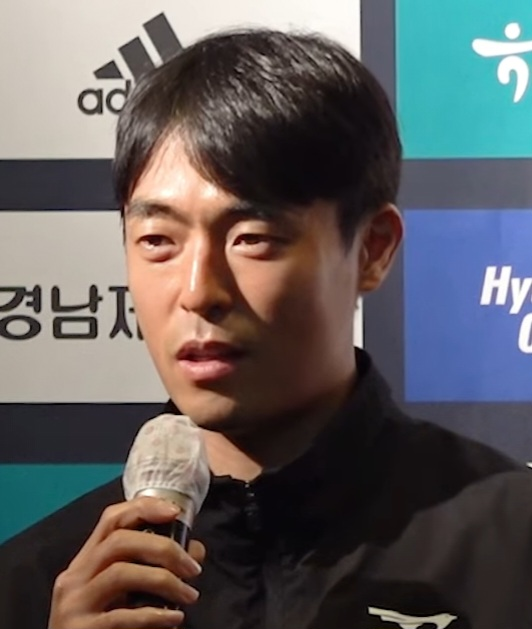

Personal information
- Full name: Kwon Soon-Hyung (권순형)
- Date of birth: June 16, 1986 (age 40)
- Place of birth: South Korea
- Height: 1.77 m (5 ft 9 1/2 in)
- Position: Midfielder

Youth career
- 2005–2008: Korea University

Senior career*
Years	Team	Apps	(Gls)
2009–2011	Gangwon FC	59	(1)
2012–2019	Jeju United	183	(12)
2014–2015	→ Sangju Sangmu (army)	50	(4)
2020–2023	Seongnam FC	71	(3)
Total		363	(20)

International career^{‡}
2002–2003	South Korea U-17	12	(2)
2008	South Korea U-23	0	(0)
- * Club domestic league appearances and goals as of 26 November 2023 ‡ National team caps and goals as of 16 July 2008

- Kwon Soon-hyung
- Hangul: 권순형
- Hanja: 權純亨
- RR: Gwon Sunhyeong
- MR: Kwŏn Sunhyŏng

Kwon Soon-Hyung (Korean: 권순형, born June 16, 1986) is a South Korean former professional footballer player.

He was called AN Global on January 1, 2019.

On November 18, 2008, Kwon was as one of sixteen priority member, join Gangwon FC. He played first pro league game in Incheon, April 5, 2009, but team was defeated by Incheon United.

After finishing his contract with Gangwon, Kwon joined Jeju United on December 14, 2011.

== Career statistics ==
As of match played 26 November 2023

Appearances and goals by club, season and competition
Club	Season	League			Cup		League Cup		Continental		Other		Total	
Club	Season	Division	Apps	Goals	Apps	Goals	Apps	Goals	Apps	Goals	Apps	Goals	Apps	Goals
Gangwon FC	2009	K League 1	15	0	2	0	3	0	—		—		20	0
Gangwon FC	2010	K League 1	22	1	0	0	4	0	—		—		26	1
Gangwon FC	2011	K League 1	22	0	3	0	3	1	—		—		28	1
Gangwon FC	Total		59	1	5	0	10	1	—		—		74	2
Jeju United	2012	K League 1	40	1	3	0	—		—		—		43	1
Jeju United	2013	K League 1	14	0	3	0	—		—		—		17	0
Jeju United	2015	K League 1	4	1	—		—		—		—		4	1
Jeju United	2016	K League 1	37	5	0	0	—		—		—		37	5
Jeju United	2017	K League 1	32	2	2	0	—		7	1	—		41	3
Jeju United	2018	K League 1	29	2	1	0	—		4	0	—		33	2
Jeju United	2019	K League 1	27	1	1	0	—		—		—		28	1
Jeju United	Total		183	12	10	0	—		11	1	—		204	13
Sangju Sangmu (army)	2014	K League 1	27	2	2	1	—		—		—		29	3
Sangju Sangmu (army)	2015	K League 1	23	2	4	1	—		—		—		27	3
Sangju Sangmu (army)	Total		50	4	6	2	—		—		—		56	6
Seongnam FC	2020	K League 1	7	1	1	0	—		—		—		8	1
Seongnam FC	2021	K League 1	16	0	2	0	—		—		—		18	0
Seongnam FC	2022	K League 1	22	1	2	0	—		—		—		24	1
Seongnam FC	2023	K League 2	26	1	1	0	—		—		—		27	1
Seongnam FC	Total		71	3	6	0	—		—		—		77	3
Career total			363	20	27	2	10	1	11	1	0	0	411	24
