= Kim Jin-il =

South Korean footballer (born 1985)

Kim Jin-Il
Personal information
- Full name: Kim Jin-Il (김진일)
- Date of birth: October 26, 1985 (age 41)
- Place of birth: South Korea
- Height: 1.76 m (5 ft 9 in)
- Position: Forward

Team information
- Current team: Yangju Citizen
- Number: 9

Senior career*
Years	Team	Apps	(Gls)
2004–2005	Pohang Steelers	0	(0)
2006–2008	Busan Transportation Corporation FC	63	(30)
2009–2010	Gangwon FC	5	(1)
2010–2011	Goyang Kookmin Bank FC	31	(4)
2012–	Yangju Citizen FC		
- * Club domestic league appearances and goals as of 23 March 2012

Kim Jin-Il (Korean: 김진일; Hanja: 金鎭一, born October 26, 1985) is a South Korean football player who, as of 2012 is playing for Yangju Citizen FC.

He was joined K-League side Pohang Steelers in 2004 season. In two seasons of Pohang, He played only 1 game for Korean FA Cup.

After release from Pohang, he moved Korea National League side Busan Transportation Corporation FC. He was played 21 games and 8 goals, 1 assist for 2007 season. He finished the 2008 season as Busan's top scorer and Korea National League's 2nd scorer with 18 goals.

From 2009, Kim plays at newly formed Gangwon FC as founding member.

In July 2010, He move back to Korea National League side Goyang Kookmin Bank FC due to long-time injury.

== Club career statistics ==
As of 1 March 2012

Club performance			League		Cup		League Cup		Total	
Season	Club	League	Apps	Goals	Apps	Goals	Apps	Goals	Apps	Goals
Korea Republic			League		FA Cup		K-League Cup		Total	
2004	Pohang Steelers	K-League	0	0	1	0	0	0	1	0
2005	Pohang Steelers	K-League	0	0	0	0	0	0	0	0
2006	Busan Transportation Corp.	National League	18	4	0	0	-		18	4
2007	Busan Transportation Corp.	National League	21	8	1	0	-		22	8
2008	Busan Transportation Corp.	National League	24	18	1	0	-		25	18
2009	Gangwon FC	K-League	5	1	0	0	0	0	5	1
2010	Gangwon FC	K-League	0	0	0	0	1	0	1	0
2010	Goyang Kookmin Bank	National League	11	3	0	0	-		11	3
2011	Goyang Kookmin Bank	National League	20	1	1	0	-		21	1
2012	Yangju Citizen	Challengers League					-			
Total			99	35	4	0	1	0	104	35

== Honours ==
Busan Kyotong

- Korean President's Cup (1) : 2006
