= Kim Ju-bong =

South Korean footballer

Kim Ju-Bong
Personal information
- Full name: Kim Ju-Bong (김주봉)
- Date of birth: April 7, 1986 (age 40)
- Place of birth: South Korea
- Height: 1.70 m (5 ft 7 in)
- Position: Midfielder

Team information
- Current team: Mokpo City
- Number: 2

Youth career
- 2005–2008: Soongsil University

Senior career*
| Years | Team | Apps | (Gls) |
| 2009 | Gangwon FC | 0 | (0) |
| 2010 | Daejeon KHNP | 15 | (0) |
| 2011– | Mokpo City | 10 | (0) |
- * Club domestic league appearances and goals as of 1 March 2012

Kim Ju-Bong (Korean: 김주봉, born April 7, 1986) is a South Korean football player who, as of 2011 is playing for Korea National League side Mokpo City FC. His previous clubs are Gangwon FC and Daejeon Hydro & Nuclear Power FC.

On November 18, 2008, he was one of sixteen priority members to join Gangwon FC. He made his debut for Gangwon against Daegu FC by substitute on April 8, 2009, in league cup match. From 2010 season, he joined Korea National League side Daejeon Hydro & Nuclear Power FC.

== Club career statistics ==
As of 1 March 2010

| Club performance | | | League | | Cup | | League Cup | | Total | |
| Season | Club | League | Apps | Goals | Apps | Goals | Apps | Goals | Apps | Goals |
| South Korea | | | League | | KFA Cup | | League Cup | | Total | |
|---|---|---|---|---|---|---|---|---|---|---|
| 2009 | Gangwon FC | K-League | 0 | 0 | 1 | 0 | 3 | 0 | 4 | 0 |
| 2010 | Daejeon HNP FC | Korea National League | 0 | 0 | 0 | 0 | - | | 0 | 0 |
| Total | South Korea | | 0 | 0 | 1 | 0 | 3 | 0 | 4 | 0 |
| Career total | | | 0 | 0 | 1 | 0 | 3 | 0 | 4 | 0 |
