= Kwak Kwang-seon =

South Korean footballer

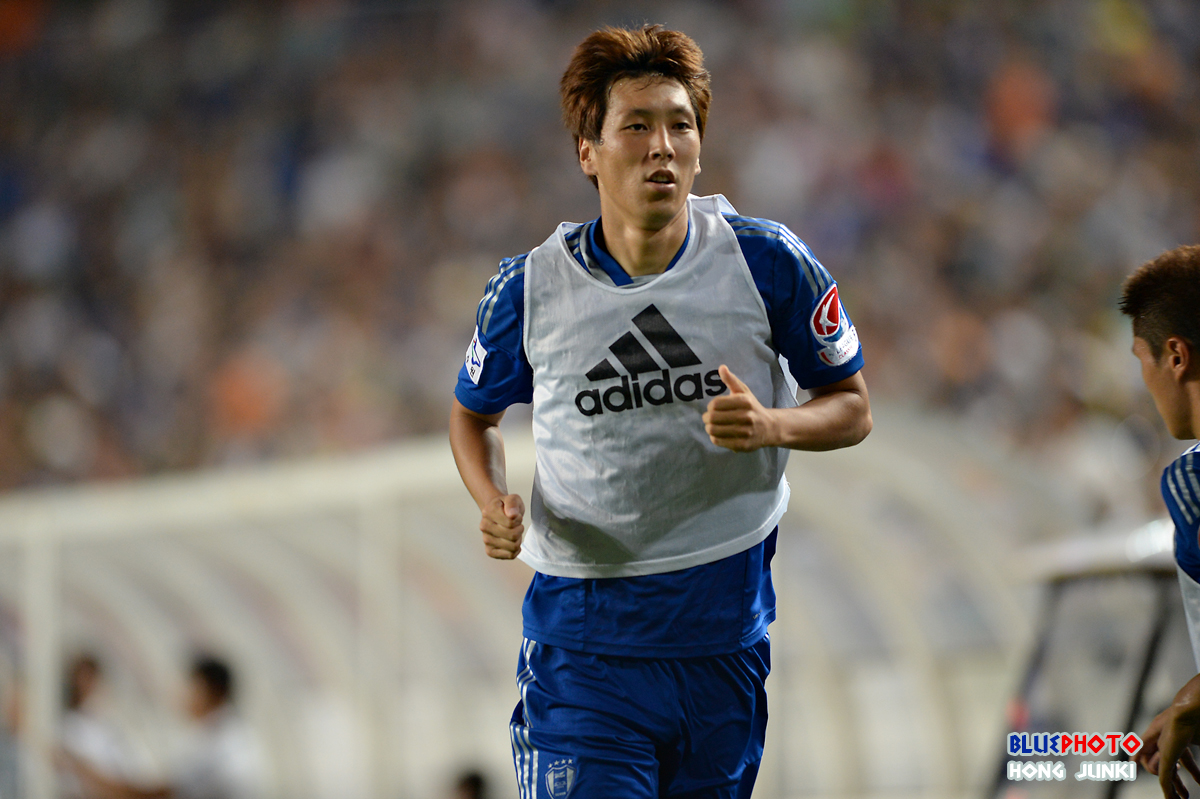

Personal information
- Full name: Kwak Kwang-seon (곽광선)
- Date of birth: March 28, 1986 (age 40)
- Place of birth: South Korea
- Height: 1.86 m (6 ft 1 in)
- Position: Defender

Team information
- Current team: Seongnam FC

Youth career
- 2005–2008: Soongsil University

Senior career*
Years	Team	Apps	(Gls)
2009–2011	Gangwon FC	76	(5)
2012–2018	Suwon Samsung Bluewings	139	(4)
2014–2015	→ Sangju Sangmu (army)	43	(0)
2019–2020	Jeonnam Dragons	42	(0)
2021	Gwangju FC	10	(0)
2022–	Seongnam FC	12	(0)
- * Club domestic league appearances and goals as of 3 October 2022

Kwak Kwang-seon (Korean: 곽광선, born March 28, 1986) is a South Korean football player for Seongnam FC.

On 18 November 2008, Kwak was as one of sixteen priority member, join the newly formed Gangwon FC.

On 11 April 2009, Kwak scored his first K-League goal of the 2009 season against Chunnam Dragons.

On 6 December 2011, Kwak was traded to Suwon Samsung Bluewings for Oh Jae-suk.

== Club career statistics ==
As of 3 October 2022

Club performance			League		Cup		League Cup		Continental		Total	
Season	Club	League	Apps	Goals	Apps	Goals	Apps	Goals	Apps	Goals	Apps	Goals
South Korea			League		KFA Cup		League Cup		Asia		Total	
2009	Gangwon FC	K League 1	26	3	0	0	2	0	–		28	3
2010	Gangwon FC	K League 1	26	2	1	0	4	0	–		31	2
2011	Gangwon FC	K League 1	24	0	2	0	3	0	–		29	0
2012	Suwon Samsung Bluewings	K League 1	30	0	3	0	–		–		33	0
2013	Suwon Samsung Bluewings	K League 1	23	0	1	0	–		4	0	28	0
2014	Suwon Samsung Bluewings	K League 1	4	0	0	0	–		–		4	0
2014	Sangju Sangmu (army)	K League 1	18	0	3	0	–		–		21	0
2015	Sangju Sangmu (army)	K League 2	25	0	0	0	–		–		25	0
2016	Suwon Samsung Bluewings	K League 1	21	1	4	1	–		0	0	25	2
2017	Suwon Samsung Bluewings	K League 1	31	2	1	0	–		4	0	36	2
2018	Suwon Samsung Bluewings	K League 1	30	2	3	0	–		9	0	42	2
2019	Jeonnam Dragons	K League 2	27	0	0	0	–		–		27	0
2020	Jeonnam Dragons	K League 2	15	0	1	0	–		–		16	0
2021	Gwangju FC	K League 1	10	0	1	0	–		–		11	0
2022	Seongnam FC	K League 1	12	0	0	0	–		–		12	0
Career total			322	10	20	1	9	0	17	0	368	9
