= Jeong San =

South Korean footballer (born 1989)

Personal information
- Date of birth: 10 February 1989 (age 37)
- Place of birth: South Korea
- Height: 1.90 m (6 ft 3 in)
- Position: Goalkeeper

Team information
- Current team: Daejeon Hana Citizen
- Number: 99

Youth career
- 2004–2006: Joongdong High School
- 2007–2008: Kyunghee University

Senior career*
Years	Team	Apps	(Gls)
2009–2010	Gangwon FC	0	(0)
2011–2015	Seongnam FC	20	(0)
2016	Ulsan Hyundai	11	(0)
2017–2021	Incheon United	70	(0)
2022–	Daejeon Hana Citizen	1	(0)
- * Club domestic league appearances and goals as of 4 April 2022

Jeong San (Korean: 정산; born 10 February 1989) is a South Korean footballer who plays as a goalkeeper for Daejeon Hana Citizen.

== Career statistics ==
As of 24 May 2023

Appearances and goals by club, season and competition
Club	Season	League			Cup		League Cup		Continental		Other		Total	
Club	Season	Division	Apps	Goals	Apps	Goals	Apps	Goals	Apps	Goals	Apps	Goals	Apps	Goals
Gangwon FC	2009	K League 1	0	0	0	0	0	0	—		—		0	0
Gangwon FC	2010	K League 1	0	0	0	0	0	0	—		—		0	0
Gangwon FC	Total		0	0	0	0	0	0	—		—		0	0
Seongnam FC	2011	K League 1	1	0	0	0	0	0	—		—		1	0
Seongnam FC	2012	K League 1	19	0	1	0	—		1	0	—		21	0
Seongnam FC	2013	K League 1	0	0	0	0	—		—		—		0	0
Seongnam FC	2014	K League 1	0	0	0	0	—		—		—		0	0
Seongnam FC	2015	K League 1	0	0	0	0	—		0	0	—		0	0
Seongnam FC	Total		20	0	1	0	0	0	1	0	—		22	0
Ulsan Hyundai	2016	K League 1	11	0	2	0	—		—		—		13	0
Incheon United	2017	K League 1	12	0	1	0	—		—		—		13	0
Incheon United	2018	K League 1	18	0	2	0	—		—		—		30	0
Incheon United	2019	K League 1	27	0	0	0	—		—		—		27	0
Incheon United	2020	K League 1	12	0	0	0	—		—		—		12	0
Incheon United	2021	K League 1	1	0	0	0	—		—		—		1	0
Incheon United	Total		70	0	3	0	—		—		—		73	0
Daejeon Hana Citizen	2022	K League 2	1	0	1	0	—		—		0	0	2	0
Daejeon Hana Citizen	2023	K League 1	0	0	2	0	—		—		—		2	0
Daejeon Hana Citizen	2024	K League 1	0	0	0	0	—		—		—		0	0
Daejeon Hana Citizen	Total		1	0	3	0	—		—		0	0	4	0
Career total			102	0	9	0	0	0	1	0	0	0	112	0
