= Yoon Jun-ha =

South Korean footballer (born 1987)

Yoon Jun-Ha
Personal information
- Full name: Yoon Jun-Ha (윤준하)
- Date of birth: January 4, 1987 (age 39)
- Place of birth: South Korea
- Height: 1.73 m (5 ft 8 in)
- Position: Forward

Team information
- Current team: Daejeon Citizen

Youth career
- 2005–2008: Daegu University

Senior career*
Years	Team	Apps	(Gls)
2009–2011	Gangwon FC	68	(8)
2012	Incheon United	3	(0)
2013–	Daejeon Citizen	6	(0)
2014–2015	→ Ansan Police (army)	38	(5)
- * Club domestic league appearances and goals as of 15 December 2015

- Yoon Jun-ha
- Hangul: 윤준하
- Hanja: 尹俊河
- RR: Yun Junha
- MR: Yun Chunha

Yoon Jun-Ha is a South Korean football player who currently plays for Daejeon Citizen.

On March 8, 2009, he scored debut goal and the final goal in the 1–0 against Jeju United. This goal is the first goal of club, too. He made three goal from first game against Jeju to third game against Busan by substitute consecutively.

On 5 January 2012, Yoon left Gangwon for Incheon United.

== Club career statistics ==
As of 31 October 2011

Club performance			League		Cup		League Cup		Total	
Season	Club	League	Apps	Goals	Apps	Goals	Apps	Goals	Apps	Goals
South Korea			League		KFA Cup		League Cup		Total	
2009	Gangwon FC	K-League	28	7	2	0	2	0	32	7
2010	Gangwon FC	K-League	14	0	1	0	3	0	18	0
2011	Gangwon FC	K-League	26	1	3	0	4	0	33	1
2012	Incheon United	K-League								
Career total			68	8	6	0	9	0	83	8
