= No Kyung-tae =

South Korean footballer

Personal information
- Date of birth: September 20, 1986 (age 40)
- Place of birth: South Korea
- Height: 1.80 m (5 ft 11 in)
- Position: Defender

Youth career
- 2005–2008: Jeonju University

Senior career*
Years	Team	Apps	(Gls)
2009–2010	Gangwon FC	5	(0)
Korean name
Hangul	노경태
RR	No Gyeongtae
MR	No Kyŏngt'ae
- * Club domestic league appearances and goals as of 10 March 2011

No Kyung-tae (Korean: 노경태, born September 20, 1986) is a South Korean football player.

== Club career ==
On November 18, 2008, he was one of sixteen priority members to join Gangwon FC. He made his debut for Gangwon against Daegu FC on April 8, 2009 in league cup match.

=== Club career statistics ===
As of 4 September 2010

Club performance			League		Cup		League Cup		Total	
Season	Club	League	Apps	Goals	Apps	Goals	Apps	Goals	Apps	Goals
South Korea			League		KFA Cup		League Cup		Total	
2009	Gangwon FC	K-League	5	0	0	0	2	0	7	0
2010	Gangwon FC	K-League	0	0	0	0	0	0	0	0
Total	South Korea		5	0	0	0	2	0	7	0
Career total			5	0	0	0	2	0	7	0
