= Lee Sung-min (footballer) =

South Korean footballer

Personal information
- Full name: Lee Sung-min
- Date of birth: 16 May 1986 (age 40)
- Place of birth: South Korea
- Height: 1.81 m (5 ft 11 in)
- Position: Striker

Youth career
- 2005–2008: Honam University

Senior career*
Years	Team	Apps	(Gls)
2009	Gangwon FC	12	(0)
2010	Gangneung City	26	(10)
2011	Daegu FC	0	(0)
2011–	Gangneung City		
- * Club domestic league appearances and goals as of 5 January 2011

- Lee Sung-min
- Hangul: 이성민
- RR: I Seongmin
- MR: I Sŏngmin

Lee Sung-min (Korean: 이성민, born 16 May 1986) is a South Korean former football player who play as a Striker.

== Club career ==
On November 20, 2008, Gangwon called Lee up as an extra order from 2009 K-League Draft. His first goal for Gangwon came on April 22, 2009, in a match against Daejeon Citizen during the League Cup group stage.

For the 2010 season, he dropped down to the second tier of South Korean football, joining Korea National League side Gangneung City FC. He proved himself to be a regular starter for his new side. On 4 January 2011, it was announced that Lee would return to the K-League, joining Daegu FC.

In 2016 season, he has played for the Buriram United in the Toyota Premier Cup with Nagoya Grampus Eight just 45 minutes of play was not good enough. His contract was canceled by that he did not play in the Thai Premier League even once.

== Club career statistics ==
As of 5 January 2011

Club performance			League		Cup		League Cup		Total	
Season	Club	League	Apps	Goals	Apps	Goals	Apps	Goals	Apps	Goals
South Korea			League		KFA Cup		League Cup		Total	
2009	Gangwon FC	K-League	12	0	2	0	4	2	18	2
2010	Gangneung City FC	Korea National League	26	10			-		26	10
2011	Daegu FC	K-League	-	-	-	-	-	-	-	-
Total	South Korea		38	10	2	0	4	2	43	12
Career total			38	10	2	0	4	2	43	12
