= Lee Se-in =

South Korea football player (born 1980)

Lee Se-In
Personal information
- Full name: Lee Se-In (이세인)
- Date of birth: June 16, 1980 (age 46)
- Place of birth: South Korea
- Height: 1.84 m (6 ft 0 in)
- Position: Defender

Youth career
- Hanyang University

Senior career*
Years	Team	Apps	(Gls)
2005–2007	Daejeon Citizen	13	(0)
2008	Busan I'Park	3	(0)
2009	Gangwon FC	7	(1)
2010	Changchun Yatai	26	(0)
2011	Busan I'Park	0	(0)
2012	Tianjin Songjiang	24	(0)
- * Club domestic league appearances and goals as of 8 July 2011

Lee Se-In (born June 16, 1980) is a South Korea football player who plays for Chinese club Tianjin Songjiang. His previous club is Daejeon Citizen, Gangwon FC and Busan I'Park. He also played for Changchun Yatai in the Chinese Super League.

== Club career ==
He scored debut and second goal consecutively came on 13 May 2009, against National League side Incheon Korail in the first round of Korean FA Cup 2009.

On 9 January 2010, Lee transferred to Changchun Yatai. On 8 July 2011, he joined Busan I'Park.

== Club career statistics ==
As of 8 July 2011

Club performance			League		Cup		League Cup		Continental		Total	
Season	Club	League	Apps	Goals	Apps	Goals	Apps	Goals	Apps	Goals	Apps	Goals
Korea Republic			League		FA Cup		K-League Cup		Asia		Total	
2005	Daejeon Citizen	K-League	2	0	1	0	1	0	-		4	0
2006	Daejeon Citizen	K-League	5	0	1	0	5	0	-		11	0
2007	Daejeon Citizen	K-League	6	0	1	0	2	0	-		9	0
2008	Busan I'Park	K-League	3	0	1	0	2	0	-		6	0
2009	Gangwon FC	K-League	7	1	1	2	3	0	-		11	3
China PR			League		FA Cup		League Cup		Asia		Total	
2010	Changchun Yatai	Chinese Super League	26	0	-		-		6	0	32	0
Korea Republic			League		FA Cup		K-League Cup		Asia		Total	
2011	Busan I'Park	K-League	0	0	0	0	0	0	-		0	0
Country	Korea Republic		23	1	5	2	13	0	0	0	41	3
Country	China PR		26	0	0	0	0	0	6	0	32	0
Total			49	1	5	2	13	0	2	0	73	3
