= Yoo Hyun =

South Korean footballer (born 1984)

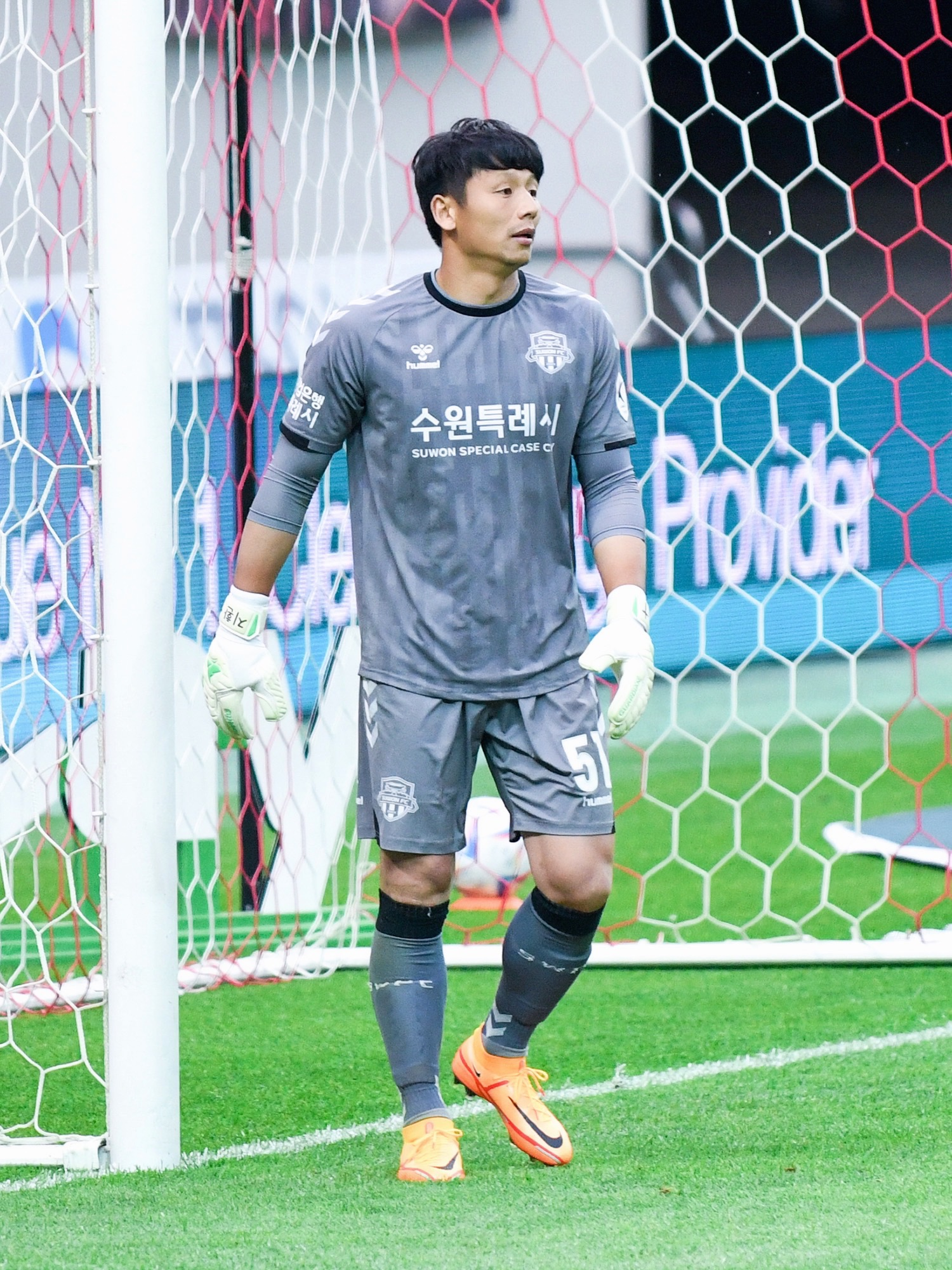
- Yoo with Suwon FC in May 2022

Personal information
- Full name: Yoo Hyun (유현)
- Date of birth: August 1, 1984 (age 42)
- Place of birth: Jangheung, Jeonnam, South Korea
- Height: 1.84 m (6 ft 0 in)
- Position: Goalkeeper

Team information
- Current team: Suwon FC
- Number: 51

Youth career
- 2003–2006: Chung-Ang University

Senior career*
Years	Team	Apps	(Gls)
2007–2008	Ulsan Hyundai Mipo Dockyard	39	(0)
2009–2011	Gangwon FC	72	(0)
2012–2015	Incheon United	71	(0)
2013–2014	→ Police FC (army)	43	(0)
2016–2018	FC Seoul	29	(0)
2019–2020	Tochigi SC	8	(0)
2020–	Suwon FC	31	(0)
Korean name
Hangul	유현
Hanja	劉鉉
RR	Yu Hyeon
MR	Yu Hyŏn
- * Club domestic league appearances and goals as of 19 January 2019

Yoo Hyun (born August 1, 1984) is a South Korean football player who currently plays for Suwon FC.

He was a member of 2005 East Asian Games's South Korea national football team. In 2007, he joined Korea National League's side Ulsan Hyundai Mipo Dockyard. He was awarded MVP in 2008 by the Korea National League.

In 2009, he moved to the newly formed Gangwon FC as a founding member with former Ulsan Hyundai Mipo Dockyard manager Choi Soon-Ho.

He left Gangwon for Incheon United in a straight swap deal involving Song Yoo-Geol on 28 November 2011. In January 2013 he joined Police FC in the new K League for the 2013 as part of his military service.

== Honours ==
=== Club ===
Ulsan Hyundai Mipo Dockyard

- Korea National League (2) : 2007, 2008
- Korean President's Cup (1) : 2008

=== Individual ===
- Korea National League MVP (1) : 2008

Awards
Preceded by (South Korea) Jung Jae-suk	N-League MVP; 2008	Succeeded by (South Korea) Na Il-gyun
