= 2007 Korea National League =

STC Cup, KB Kookmin Bank Korea National League
- Season: 2007
- Dates: 6 April – 28 November 2007
- Champions: Hyundai Mipo Dockyard (1st title)
- Matches: 132
- Goals: 372 (2.82 per match)
- Best Player: Jung Jae-seok
- Top goalscorer: Lim Ho (14 goals)

The 2007 Korea National League was the fifth season of the Korea National League, which was then the second-highest division of South Korea's football league system. The league was divided into two stages, and the winners of each stage qualified for the championship playoff.

== Regular season ==
=== First stage ===
Pos	Team	Pld	W	D	L	GF	GA	GD	Pts	Qualification
1	Hyundai Mipo Dockyard	11	8	1	2	20	7	+13	25	Qualification for the playoff
2	Gangneung City	11	8	1	2	19	10	+9	25	
3	Incheon Korail	11	7	1	3	16	10	+6	22	
4	Suwon City	11	5	1	5	15	13	+2	16	
5	Daejeon KHNP	11	3	5	3	13	10	+3	14	
6	Goyang KB Kookmin Bank	11	7	2	2	20	8	+12	13 (Note: Goyang KB Kookmin Bank was docked 10 points due to the refusal of promotion.)	
7	Busan Transportation Corporation	11	3	4	4	15	14	+1	13	
8	Icheon Hummel Korea	11	3	3	5	11	13	−2	12	
9	Ansan Hallelujah	11	3	3	5	9	15	−6	12	
10	Seosan Omega	11	2	2	7	11	21	−10	8	
11	Changwon City	11	2	2	7	8	19	−11	8	
12	Yeosu INGNEX	11	2	1	8	11	28	−17	7	

Source: RSSSF

=== Second stage ===
Pos	Team	Pld	W	D	L	GF	GA	GD	Pts	Qualification
1	Suwon City	11	10	1	0	25	8	+17	31	Qualification for the playoff
2	Hyundai Mipo Dockyard	11	6	4	1	20	11	+9	22	
3	Incheon Korail	11	6	2	3	20	18	+2	20	
4	Gangneung City	11	5	2	4	21	15	+6	17	
5	Busan Transportation Corporation	11	4	3	4	16	16	0	15	
6	Changwon City	11	4	2	5	16	23	−7	14	
7	Ansan Hallelujah	11	3	4	4	16	17	−1	13	
8	Icheon Hummel Korea	11	1	8	2	12	12	0	11	
9	Goyang KB Kookmin Bank	11	6	2	3	26	13	+13	10 (Note: Goyang KB Kookmin Bank was docked 10 points due to the refusal of promotion.)	
10	Daejeon KHNP	11	1	4	6	7	17	−10	7	
11	Seosan Omega	11	1	2	8	13	27	−14	5	
12	Yeosu INGNEX	11	1	2	8	12	27	−15	5	

Source: RSSSF

== Championship playoff ==
=== Summary ===
Team 1	Agg.	Team 2	1st leg	2nd leg
Hyundai Mipo Dockyard (C)	7–1	Suwon City	3–0	4–1

=== Results ===
23 November

Hyundai Mipo Dockyard	3–0 Forfeited	Suwon City
	Report

Munsu World Cup Stadium, Ulsan
Attendance: 257

28 November

Suwon City	1–4	Hyundai Mipo Dockyard
Ko Jae-hyo 52'	Report	Jeong Jae-seok 3'; Ahn Sung-nam 62'; Kim Young-hoo 68'; Kim Young-hoo 76'

Suwon World Cup Stadium, Suwon
Attendance: 985

Hyundai Mipo Dockyard won 7–1 on aggregate.

== Awards ==
=== Main awards ===
Award	Winner	Club
Most Valuable Player	(South Korea) Jung Jae-seok	Hyundai Mipo Dockyard
Top goalscorer	(South Korea) Lim Ho	Gangneung City
Top assist provider	(South Korea) Kim Yo-hwan	Goyang KB Kookmin Bank
Manager of the Year	(South Korea) Choi Soon-ho	Hyundai Mipo Dockyard
Fair Play Award	Ansan Hallelujah	

=== Best XI ===
Position	Winner	Club
Goalkeeper	(South Korea) Yoo Hyun	Hyundai Mipo Dockyard
Defenders	(South Korea) Cho Sung-rae	Busan Transportation Corporation
Defenders	(South Korea) Ha Jae-hoon	Changwon City
Defenders	(South Korea) Lee Su-jae	Icheon Hummel Korea
Defenders	(South Korea) Kim Jung-kyum	Daejeon KHNP
Midfielders	(South Korea) Ahn Sung-nam	Hyundai Mipo Dockyard
Midfielders	(South Korea) Jung Jae-seok	Hyundai Mipo Dockyard
Midfielders	(South Korea) Kim Yo-hwan	Goyang KB Kookmin Bank
Midfielders	(South Korea) Lee Seung-tae	Changwon City
Forwards	(South Korea) Lim Ho	Gangneung City
Forwards	(South Korea) Sung Ho-sang	Ansan Hallelujah

== See also ==
- 2007 in South Korean football
- 2007 Korea National League Championship
- 2007 Korean FA Cup
