= 2008 Korea National League =

KB Kookmin Bank Korea National League
- Season: 2008
- Dates: 5 April – 8 November 2008
- Champions: Hyundai Mipo Dockyard (2nd title)
- Matches: 186
- Goals: 556 (2.99 per match)
- Best Player: Yoo Hyun
- Top goalscorer: Kim Young-hoo (30 goals)

The 2008 Korea National League was the sixth season of the Korea National League. It was divided into two stages, and the top two clubs of the overall table qualified for the championship playoffs in addition to the winners of each stage.

== Regular season ==
=== First stage ===
Pos	Team	Pld	W	D	L	GF	GA	GD	Pts	Qualification
1	Hyundai Mipo Dockyard	13	11	2	0	29	8	+21	35	Qualification for the playoffs
2	Busan Transportation Corporation	13	8	3	2	27	18	+9	27	
3	Suwon City	13	7	3	3	21	11	+10	24	
4	Gangneung City	13	7	3	3	22	18	+4	24	
5	Gimhae City	13	7	1	5	16	17	−1	22	
6	Goyang KB Kookmin Bank	13	6	3	4	23	14	+9	21	
7	Cheonan City	13	5	4	4	18	15	+3	19	
8	Daejeon KHNP	13	4	4	5	16	17	−1	16	
9	Changwon City	13	4	4	5	16	19	−3	16	
10	Ansan Hallelujah	13	4	2	7	18	21	−3	14	
11	Nowon Hummel Korea	13	2	6	5	14	21	−7	12	
12	Incheon Korail	13	2	3	8	12	21	−9	9	
13	Yesan FC	13	1	4	8	11	24	−13	7	
14	Hongcheon Idu	13	0	4	9	15	34	−19	4	

Source: RSSSF

=== Second stage ===
Pos	Team	Pld	W	D	L	GF	GA	GD	Pts	Qualification
1	Suwon City	13	11	1	1	33	15	+18	34	Qualification for the playoffs
2	Gangneung City	13	7	4	2	20	11	+9	25	
3	Ansan Hallelujah	13	7	4	2	22	15	+7	25	
4	Hyundai Mipo Dockyard	13	7	3	3	40	25	+15	24	
5	Gimhae City	13	7	1	5	25	19	+6	22	
6	Daejeon KHNP	13	6	2	5	18	13	+5	20	
7	Goyang KB Kookmin Bank	13	5	4	4	12	12	0	19	
8	Changwon City	13	5	3	5	23	15	+8	18	
9	Busan Transportation Corporation	13	5	2	6	22	19	+3	17	
10	Nowon Hummel Korea	13	3	5	5	15	18	−3	14	
11	Cheonan City	13	3	4	6	22	27	−5	13	
12	Incheon Korail	13	3	3	7	13	24	−11	12	
13	Hongcheon Idu	13	2	0	11	20	51	−31	6	
14	Yesan FC	13	0	4	9	13	34	−21	4	

Source: RSSSF

=== Overall table ===
Pos	Team	Pld	W	D	L	GF	GA	GD	Pts	Qualification
1	Hyundai Mipo Dockyard	26	18	5	3	69	33	+36	59	First stage winners
2	Suwon City	26	18	4	4	54	26	+28	58	Second stage winners
3	Gangneung City FC	26	14	7	5	42	29	+13	49	Qualification for the playoffs
4	Busan Transportation Corporation	26	13	5	8	49	37	+12	44	Qualification for the playoffs
5	Gimhae City	26	14	2	10	41	36	+5	44	
6	Goyang KB Kookmin Bank	26	11	7	8	35	26	+9	40	
7	Ansan Hallelujah	26	11	6	9	40	36	+4	39	
8	Daejeon KHNP	26	10	6	10	34	30	+4	36	
9	Changwon City	26	9	7	10	39	34	+5	34	
10	Cheonan City	26	8	8	10	40	42	−2	32	
11	Nowon Hummel Korea	26	5	11	10	29	39	−10	26	
12	Incheon Korail	26	5	6	15	25	45	−20	21	
13	Yesan FC	26	1	8	17	24	58	−34	11	
14	Hongcheon Idu	26	2	4	20	35	85	−50	10	

Source: RSSSF

== Championship playoffs ==
=== Bracket ===
Semi-finals
Hyundai Mipo Dockyard	3
Gangneung City	0
Suwon City	2
Busan Transportation Corporation	0

Final
Hyundai Mipo Dockyard (p)	1	1	2 (5)
Suwon City	1	1	2 (4)

=== Semi-finals ===
November 8

Hyundai Mipo Dockyard	3–0	Gangneung City
Kim Bong-kyum 78'; Choi Young-nam 84'; Kim Young-hoo 87'	Report

Ulsan Complex Stadium, Ulsan
Attendance: 324

November 8

Suwon City	2–0	Busan Transportation Corporation
Park Hee-wan 55'; Jung Jae-woon 90+3'	Report

Suwon Civil Stadium, Suwon
Attendance: 2,813

=== Final ===
November 12

Suwon City	1–1	Hyundai Mipo Dockyard
Lee Joon-young} 81'	Report	Cho Sung-yoon 80'

Suwon Civil Stadium, Suwon
Attendance: 3,251

November 16

Hyundai Mipo Dockyard	1–1 (a.e.t.)	Suwon City
Kim Ki-hyung 57'	Report	Ha Jung-heon 90'
Penalties
	5–4

Ulsan Complex Stadium, Ulsan
Attendance: 1,513

2–2 on aggregate. Hyundai Mipo Dockyard won 5–4 on penalties.

== Top scorers ==
This list includes goals of the championship playoffs. The official top goalscorer was decided with records of only regular season, and Kim Young-hoo won the award with 30 goals.

Rank	Player	Club	Goals	Apps
1	(South Korea) Kim Young-hoo	Hyundai Mipo Dockyard	31	29
2	(South Korea) Kim Jin-il	Busan Transportation Corporation	18	24
3	(South Korea) Kim Min-goo	Gangneung City	13	21
4	(South Korea) Lee Kil-yong	Changwon City	13	25
5	(South Korea) Gu Hyun-seo	Cheonan City	13	25
5	(South Korea) Park Dong-il	Hongcheon Idu	13	25
7	(South Korea) Ha Jung-heon	Suwon City	11	14
8	(South Korea) Cho Joo-young	Daejeon KHNP	10	22
9	(South Korea) Yang Dong-chul	Gimhae City	9	26

== Awards ==
=== Main awards ===
Award	Winner	Club
Most Valuable Player	(South Korea) Yoo Hyun	Hyundai Mipo Dockyard
Top goalscorer	(South Korea) Kim Young-hoo	Hyundai Mipo Dockyard
Top assist provider	(South Korea) Kim Yo-hwan	Goyang KB Kookmin Bank
Manager of the Year	(South Korea) Choi Soon-ho	Hyundai Mipo Dockyard
Club of the Year	Ansan Hallelujah	
Fair Play Award	Hyundai Mipo Dockyard	

=== Best XI ===
Position	Winner	Club
Goalkeeper	(South Korea) Yoo Hyun	Hyundai Mipo Dockyard
Defenders	(South Korea) Kim Do-yong	Busan Transportation Corporation
Defenders	(South Korea) Lee Young-kyun	Suwon City
Defenders	(South Korea) Kim Bong-kyum	Hyundai Mipo Dockyard
Defenders	(South Korea) Kim Jung-kyum	Daejeon KHNP
Midfielders	(South Korea) Park Hee-wan	Suwon City
Midfielders	(South Korea) Cha Jong-yoon	Goyang KB Kookmin Bank
Midfielders	(South Korea) Na Il-kyun	Gangneung City
Midfielders	(South Korea) Jo Joo-young	Daejeon KHNP
Forwards	(South Korea) Kim Young-hoo	Hyundai Mipo Dockyard
Forwards	(South Korea) Kim Jin-il	Busan Transportation Corporation

== See also ==
- 2008 in South Korean football
- 2008 Korea National League Championship
- 2008 Korean FA Cup
