= 2012 Ulsan Hyundai FC season =

Ulsan Hyundai
2012 season
- Chairman: (South Korea) Kwon Oh-Gab
- Head Coach: Kim Ho-Gon
- Stadium: Big Crown
- K-League: 5th
- Korean FA Cup: Semifinals
- Champions League: Champions
- Club World Cup: 6th
- Top goalscorer: League: (Brazil) Maranhão (9); All: (Brazil) Maranhão (14)
- Highest home attendance: 42,153 vs Al-Ahli (November 10)
- Lowest home attendance: 1,107 vs Seongnam (March 16)
- Average home league attendance: 5,413 (as of May 30)
Home colours	Away colours

The 2012 season was Ulsan Hyundai FC's thirtieth season in the K-League in South Korea. Ulsan Hyundai is competing K-League, Korean FA Cup, AFC Champions League and FIFA Club World Cup.

== Current squad ==
Note: Flags indicate national team as defined under FIFA eligibility rules; some limited exceptions apply. Players may hold more than one non-FIFA nationality.

No.	Pos.	Nation	Player
1	GK	KOR	Kim Young-Kwang
2	DF	KOR	Lee Yong
3	DF	KOR	Lee Jae-Seong
4	DF	KOR	Kang Min-Soo
5	DF	KOR	Kwak Tae-Hwi (captain)
6	DF	KOR	Choi Sung-Hwan
7	MF	KOR	Ko Chang-Hyun
8	MF	KOR	Lee Ho
9	FW	KOR	Kim Shin-Wook
10	FW	BRA	Maranhão (on loan from Ventforet Kofu)
11	FW	KOR	Lee Keun-Ho
13	FW	KOR	Kim Seung-Yong
14	MF	KOR	Kim Young-Sam
15	MF	KOR	Kim Dong-Suk
16	MF	KOR	Park Seung-Il
17	MF	KOR	Go Seul-Ki
18	GK	KOR	Kim Seung-Gyu
19	FW	BRA	Rafinha (on loan from Nacional AC)

No.	Pos.	Nation	Player
20	MF	COL	Julián Estiven Vélez
21	FW	KOR	Lee Seung-Yeoul (on loan from Gamba Osaka)
22	DF	KOR	Choi Bo-Kyung
23	FW	KOR	Kim Da-Bin
24	DF	KOR	Lim Chang-Woo
25	MF	KOR	Choi Jin-soo
27	DF	KOR	Kang Jin-Wook
28	DF	KOR	Kim Chi-Gon
29	MF	KOR	Kim Yong-Tae
30	DF	KOR	Jung Woon
31	GK	KOR	Jeon Hong-Suk
32	FW	KOR	Park Kyung-Ik
33	MF	KOR	Min Hoon-Gi
34	DF	KOR	Yoon Jung-Min
35	GK	KOR	Lee Hee-Sung
37	FW	KOR	Park Dong-Hyuk
39	MF	KOR	Lee Dong-Hyun

=== Out on loan ===
Note: Flags indicate national team as defined under FIFA eligibility rules; some limited exceptions apply. Players may hold more than one non-FIFA nationality.

No.	Pos.	Nation	Player
—	MF	KOR	Byun Woong (to Ulsan Hyundai Mipo Dolphin until 2012 season)
—	FW	KOR	Kim Hyo-Gi (to Ulsan Hyundai Mipo Dolphin until 2012 season)

No.	Pos.	Nation	Player
—	MF	KOR	Kim Seo-Joon (to Ulsan Hyundai Mipo Dolphin until 2012 season)
—	MF	KOR	Kim Jong-Gook (to Gangwon FC until 2012 season)

== Transfer ==
=== In ===
Note: Flags indicate national team as defined under FIFA eligibility rules; some limited exceptions apply. Players may hold more than one non-FIFA nationality.

No.	Pos.	Nation	Player
—	DF	KOR	Kim Nam-Geol (Drafted from Korea University)
—	DF	KOR	Jung Woon (Drafted from Myongji University)
—	MF	KOR	Kim Hyun-Ki (Drafted from Hannam University)
—	MF	KOR	Jung Jang-Hoon (Drafted from Daegu University)
—	MF	KOR	Lee Dong-Hyun (Drafted from Myongji University)
—	MF	KOR	Kim Seung-Yong (Transferred from Gamba Osaka)
—	FW	KOR	Kim Hyo-Gi (Loan returned from Ulsan Hyundai Mipo Dolphin)

No.	Pos.	Nation	Player
—	FW	KOR	Lee Keun-Ho (Transferred from Gamba Osaka)
—	FW	BRA	Rafinha (Loaned from Nacional AC)
—	DF	KOR	Choi Sung-Hwan (Transferred from Suwon Samsung Bluewings)
—	FW	KOR	Lee Seung-Yeoul (Loaned from Gamba Osaka)
—	DF	KOR	Kim Chi-Gon (Transferred from Sangju Sangmu Phoenix)
—	MF	KOR	Kim Yong-Tae (Transferred from Sangju Sangmu Phoenix)

=== Out ===
Note: Flags indicate national team as defined under FIFA eligibility rules; some limited exceptions apply. Players may hold more than one non-FIFA nationality.

No.	Pos.	Nation	Player
—	GK	KOR	Choi Moo-Lim (Transferred to Ulsan Hyundai Mipo Dolphin)
—	FW	KOR	Lee Jin-Ho (Transferred to Daegu FC)
—	MF	JPN	Akihiro Ienaga (Loan returned to Mallorca)
—	DF	KOR	Choi Jae-Soo (Transferred to Suwon Samsung Bluewings)
—	MF	KOR	Byun Woong (Loaned to Ulsan Hyundai Mipo Dolphin)

No.	Pos.	Nation	Player
—	FW	KOR	Kim Hyo-Gi (Loaned to Ulsan Hyundai Mipo Dolphin)
—	MF	KOR	Kim Seo-Joon (Loaned to Ulsan Hyundai Mipo Dolphin)
—	MF	KOR	Kim Jong-Gook (Loaned to Gangwon FC)
—	FW	KOR	Jung Jang-Hoon (released)
—	DF	KOR	Kim Nam-Geol (released)

== Coaching staff ==
Position	Staff
Manager	(South Korea) Kim Ho-Gon
Assistant Manager	(South Korea) Kim Hyun-Seok
Coach	(South Korea) Kim Sang-Hoon
Coach	(South Korea) Kim Joon-Hyun
GK Coach	(South Korea) Kim Sung-Soo
Scouter	(South Korea) Seo Hyuk-Su

Last updated: 29 February 2012
Source: Ulsan Hyundai FC

== Match results ==
=== K-League ===
All times are Korea Standard Time (KST) – UTC+9

Date Round	Home	Score	Away	Location

3 March 1	Pohang	0–1	Ulsan	Pohang, Gyeongbuk
15:00		Report	Kim Shin-Wook 44'	Stadium: Pohang Steel Yard; Attendance: 13,612; Referee: Song Min-Seok

11 March 2	Ulsan	2–1	Gyeongnam	Nam-gu, Ulsan
17:00	Kwak Tae-Hwi 42'; Maranhão 66' (Assist by No.13)	Report	Lee Jae-An 83'	Stadium: Ulsan Munsu Football Stadium; Attendance: 5,537; Referee: Lee Dong-Jun

16 March 3	Ulsan	3–0	Seongnam	Nam-gu, Ulsan
19:00	Lee Keun-Ho 45'; Lee Keun-Ho 51' (Assist by No.17); Lee Keun-Ho 75' (Assist by No.27)	Report		Stadium: Ulsan Munsu Football Stadium; Attendance: 1,107; Referee: Lee Min-Hu

25 March 4	Daegu	1–0	Ulsan	Suseong-gu, Daegu
17:00	Matheus 12'	Report		Stadium: Daegu Stadium; Attendance: 5,729; Referee: Ko Hyung-Jin

31 March 5	Ulsan	2–2	Sangju	Nam-gu, Ulsan
15:00	Kang Min-Soo 51'; Lee Keun-Ho 56' (pen.)	Report	Kim Jae-Sung 37'; Ko Cha-Won 45'	Stadium: Ulsan Munsu Football Stadium; Attendance: 3,349; Referee: Ko Keum-Bok

8 April 6	Gwangju	0–1	Ulsan	Seo-gu, Gwangju
15:00		Report	Kim Shin-Wook 66' (Assist by No.14)	Stadium: Gwangju World Cup Stadium; Attendance: 3,423; Referee: Yoo Sun-Ho

11 April 7	Jeju	0–0	Ulsan	Seogwipo, Jeju
15:00		Report		Stadium: Jeju World Cup Stadium; Attendance: 7,086; Referee: Lee Jong-Guk

22 April 9	Incheon	0–1	Ulsan	Nam-gu, Incheon
15:00		Report	Maranhão 90+3' (Assist by No.17)	Stadium: Incheon Football Stadium; Attendance: 1,434; Referee: Lee Min-Hu

25 April 8	Ulsan	2–2	Seoul	Nam-gu, Ulsan
19:00	Go Seul-Ki; Maranhão 77'	Report	Damjanović 9', 52'; Choi Hyun-Tae (yellow card) 31' (yellow-red card) 64'	Stadium: Ulsan Munsu Football Stadium; Attendance: 1,272; Referee: Kim Sung-Ho

28 April 10	Ulsan	2–0	Daejeon	Nam-gu, Ulsan
15:00	Maranhão 69' (Assist by No.17); Maranhão 78' (Assist by No.17)	Report		Stadium: Ulsan Munsu Football Stadium; Attendance: 3,538; Referee: Kim Dae-Yong

6 May 11	Ulsan	1–0	Chunnam	Nam-gu, Ulsan
14:00	Go Seul-Ki 85' (Assist by No.9)	Report		Stadium: Ulsan Munsu Football Stadium; Attendance: 10,097; Referee: An Yong-Hee

11 May 12	Jeonbuk	2–1	Ulsan	Jeonju, Jeonbuk
19:00	Eninho 12'; Droguett 16'	Report	Lee Keun-Ho 83' (Assist by No.17)	Stadium: Jeonju World Cup Stadium; Attendance: 9,887; Referee: Yoo Sun-Ho

20 May 13	Suwon	2–1	Ulsan	Suwon, Gyeonggi
15:00	Bosnar 17'; Éverton 87'	Report	Lee Jae-Seong 8' (Assist by No.7)	Stadium: Suwon World Cup Stadium; Attendance: 37,519; Referee: Kim Sung-Ho

26 May 14	Ulsan	1–2	Gangwon	Nam-gu, Ulsan
17:00	Ko Chang-Hyun 38'	Report	Kim Eun-Jung 37'; Jung Sung-Min 42'	Stadium: Ulsan Munsu Football Stadium; Attendance: 11,373; Referee: Ko Hyung-Jin

14 June 15	Ulsan	2–1	Busan	Nam-gu, Ulsan
19:00	Kim Seung-Yong 22' (Free kick); Kim Seung-Yong 35' (Assist by No.17)	Report	Kim Chang-Soo 33'	Stadium: Ulsan Munsu Football Stadium; Attendance: 2,598; Referee: Lee Min-Hu

17 June 16	Gyeongnam	3–2	Ulsan	Changwon, Gyeongnam
19:00	Kang Seung-Jo 31'; Caíque 76'; Kim In-Han 80'	Report	Maranhão 47' (Assist by No.13); Kim Shin-Wook 69' (Assist by No.14)	Stadium: Changwon Football Center; Attendance: 2,471; Referee: Lee Jong-Guk

24 June 17	Seoul	1–1	Ulsan	Mapo-gu, Seoul
19:00	Go Seul-Ki 39' (o.g.)	Report(English); Report(Korean)	Maranhão 46'	Stadium: Seoul World Cup Stadium; Attendance: 25,653; Referee: Kim Sung-Ho

27 June 18	Ulsan	3–1	Pohang	Nam-gu, Ulsan
19:00	Maranhão 27' (Assist by No.6); Ienaga 48' (Assist by No.10); Choi Jae-Soo 67' (Free kick)	Report(English); Report(Korean)	No Byung-Jun 30'; Shin Kwang-Hoon (red card) 58'	Stadium: Ulsan Munsu Football Stadium; Attendance: 14,135; Referee: Ko Keum-Bok

1 July 19	Chunnam	0–1	Ulsan	Gwangyang, Jeonnam
19:00	Jung Myung-Oh (yellow card) 48'	Report	Kim Seung-Yong (yellow card) 3'; Go Seul-Ki (yellow card) 56'; Lee Keun-Ho 60'	Stadium: Gwangyang Football Stadium; Attendance: 2,720; Referee: Lee Min-Hu

12 July 20	Ulsan	2–2	Jeju	Nam-gu, Ulsan
19:00	Kim Shin-Wook 34'; Lee Keun-Ho 53'		Seo Dong-Hyun 2'; Song Jin-Hyung 90+1'	Stadium: Ulsan Munsu Football Stadium

15 July 21	Gangwon	1–2	Ulsan	Gangneung, Gangwon
18:00	Kim Eun-Jung 42'		Kim Shin-Wook 40'; Lee Keun-Ho 54'	Stadium: Gangneung Stadium

22 July 22	Ulsan	2–1	Gwangju	Nam-gu, Ulsan
20:00	Lee Keun-Ho (yellow card) 20'; Maranhão 56'; Kwak Tae-Hwi 90'	Report	Jeong Woo-In (yellow card) 16'; Kim Dong-Sub 36'; Lee Seung-Gi (yellow card) 69'	Stadium: Ulsan Munsu Football Stadium; Attendance: 8,280; Referee: Lee Jong-Kuk

25 July 23	Busan	1–0	Ulsan	Yeonje-gu, Busan
20:30	Lim Sang-Hyub 69'; Kim Han-Yoon (yellow card) 73'	Report	Kim Shin-Wook (yellow card) 52'	Stadium: Busan Asiad Main Stadium; Attendance: 2,207; Referee: Kim Jong-Hyeok

28 July 24	Daejeon	0–0	Ulsan	Yuseong-gu, Daejeon
20:00	Alessandro Lopes Pereira (yellow card) 39'; Oris (yellow card) 90+1'	Report	Choi Sung-Hwan (yellow card) 41'; Estiven (yellow card) 65'	Stadium: Daejeon World Cup Stadium; Attendance: 3,039; Referee: Woo Sang-Il

5 August 25	Ulsan	3–2	Suwon	Nam-gu, Ulsan
19:00	Kim Seung-Yong (yellow card) 20'; Kwak Tae-Hwi 24'; Lee Jae-Seong (yellow card) 33'; Kim Shin-Wook 43', 60'	Report(Eng); Report(Kor)	Yang Sang-Min (yellow card) 17' (goal) 19'; Choi Jae-Soo (yellow card) 45' (goal) 51'; Hong Soon-Hak (yellow card) 56'; Radončić (yellow card) 88'	Stadium: Ulsan Munsu Football Stadium; Attendance: 5,985; Referee: Ko Keum-Bok

8 August 26	Seongnam	0–1	Ulsan	Seongnam, Gyeonggi
19:30	Byun Sung-Hwan (yellow card) 27'; Hwang Jae-Won (yellow card) 65'; Hong Chul (yellow card) 84'	Report	Kim Seung-Yong 84'	Stadium: Tancheon Sports Complex; Attendance: 1,885; Referee: Lee Min-Hu

12 August 27	Ulsan	1–1	Daegu	Nam-gu, Ulsan
20:00	Rafinha 52'; Kim Seung-Yong (yellow card) 77'; Choi Sung-Hwan (yellow card) 85'	Report	Dinélson (yellow card) 32'; An Sang-Hyun (yellow card) 45'; Song Je-Heon (yellow card) 75' (goal) 90'	Stadium: Ulsan Munsu Football Stadium; Attendance: 4,727; Referee: Yoo Sun-Ho

18 August 28	Ulsan	0–1	Incheon	Nam-gu, Ulsan
20:00	Maranhão (yellow card) 23'; Kim Young-Sam (yellow card) 48'	Report	Seol Ki-Hyeon 8'; Nam Joon-Jae (yellow card) 85'	Stadium: Ulsan Munsu Football Stadium; Attendance: 25,395; Referee: Lee Jong-Kuk

22 August 29	Sangju	3–4	Ulsan	Sangju, Gyeongbuk
20:00	Yoo Chang-Hyun 30' (yellow card) 32'; Ha Sung-Min (yellow card) 41'; Kim Jae-Sung 73', 86'	Summary	Kim Shin-Wook 6', 42', 71' (yellow card) 44'; Rafinha 20'	Stadium: Sangju Civic Stadium; Attendance: 2,358; Referee: Kim Jong-Hyeok

26 August 30	Ulsan	1–1	Jeonbuk	Nam-gu, Ulsan
20:00	Rafinha 9'	Report	Kim Dong-Chan 46'; Sim Woo-Yeon (yellow card) 76'	Stadium: Ulsan Munsu Football Stadium; Attendance: 18,611; Referee: Lee Min-Hu

15 September 2012 31	Gyeongnam FC	1–2	Ulsan	Changwon, South Gyeongsang Province
16:00	Kim In-Han 15'; Jung Da-Hwon (yellow card) 54'; Yoon Sin-Young (yellow card) 83'	Summary	Rafinha 5' (yellow card) 90'; Lee Seung-Yeoul (yellow card) 21'; Kim Shin-Wook 79'	Stadium: Changwon Football Center; Attendance: 1,857; Referee: Sun-Ho Yoo

23 September 2012 32	Ulsan	2–2	Busan IPark	Nam-gu, Ulsan
18:00	Lee Seung-Yeoul 50'; Maranhão (yellow card) 77'; Kang Min-Soo 90+2'	Summary	Bang Seung-Hwan (yellow card) 43'; Han Ji-Ho 47'; Park Jong-Woo (yellow card) 56'; Kim Han-Yoon 90'; Lim Sang-Hyub (yellow card) 90+1'	Stadium: Ulsan Munsu Football Stadium; Attendance: 4,575; Referee: Min-Seok Song

26 September 2012 33	Ulsan	1–2	FC Seoul	Nam-gu, Ulsan
20:30	Rafinha 24'; Kang Min-Soo (yellow card) 80'	Summary	Molina 22'; Damjanović (yellow card) 33' (goal) 90'; Ha Dae-Sung (yellow card) 42'	Stadium: Ulsan Munsu Football Stadium; Attendance: 13,101; Referee: Hyung-Jin Ko

8 October 2012 34	Ulsan	0–0	Jeju United	Nam-gu, Ulsan
20:30		Summary	Madaschi (yellow card) 27'; Seo Dong-Hyun (yellow card) 32'	Stadium: Ulsan Munsu Football Stadium; Attendance: 3,889; Referee: Jong-Kuk Lee

14 October 2012 35	Pohang Steelers	3–1	Ulsan	North Gyeongsang Province, Pohang
16:00	Park Hee-Chul (yellow card) 35'; Kim Dae-Ho 41'; Asamoah 68'; Park Sung-Ho 72'	Summary	Kang Min-Soo (yellow card) 19'; Lee Seung-Yeoul (yellow card) 27'; Maranhão 58'; Kim Seung-Yong (yellow card) 75'; Kim Yong-Sam (yellow card) 88'	Stadium: Pohang Steel Yard; Attendance: 9,121; Referee: Jong-Hyeok Kim

17 October 2012 36	Ulsan	1–3	Jeonbuk Hyundai Motors	Nam-gu, Ulsan
20:30	Kim Dong-Suk [ (yellow card) 13' (yellow-red card) 31'; Go Seul-Ki 42'; Vélez (yellow card) 77'	Summary	Lee Dong-Gook 10'; Droguett 35'; Lim You-Hwan (yellow card) 64'; Leonardo 75'; Jin Kyung-Sun (yellow card) 79'	Stadium: Ulsan Munsu Football Stadium; Attendance: 2,159; Referee: Dong-Jun Lee

28 October 2012 37	Suwon Samsung Bluewings	0–0	Ulsan	Suwon
15:00	Lee Sang-ho (yellow card) 27'; Oh Jang-Eun (yellow card) 47'	Summary	Go Seul-Ki (yellow card) 6'; Choi Bo-Kyung (yellow card) 50'	Stadium: Suwon World Cup Stadium; Attendance: 21,130; Referee: Wan-Tae Kim

3 November 2012 38	Ulsan	0–1	Pohang Steelers	Ulsan
15:00		Summary	No Byung-Jun 68'; Hwang Ji-Soo (yellow card) 76'	Stadium: Ulsan Munsu Football Stadium; Attendance: 5,784; Referee: Sun-Ho Yoo

15 November 2012 39	FC Seoul	3–1	Ulsan	Seoul
20:00	Adilson 11'; Hyun Young-Min 19' (red card) 90'; Damjanović 43'	Summary	Choi Bo-Kyung (yellow card) 88'; Maranhão 90+2'	Stadium: Seoul World Cup Stadium; Attendance: 7,278; Referee: Jong-Kuk Lee

18 November 2012 40	Ulsan	0–0	Suwon Samsung Bluewings	Ulsan
15:00	Rafinha (yellow card) 22'	Summary	Oh Jang-Eun (yellow card) 22'; Choi Jae-Soo (yellow card) 46'	Stadium: Ulsan Munsu Football Stadium; Attendance: 7,239; Referee: Sang-Il Woo

21 November 2012 41	Jeonbuk Hyundai Motors	3–3	Ulsan	Jeonju
19:00	Lee Dong-Gook 31', 69' (pen.); Lee Seung-Hyun (yellow card) 76'; Eninho 82'	Summary	Lee Jae-Seong (yellow card) 26'; Ko Chang-Hyun 27'; Maranhão 43', 45+2' (pen.); Rim Chang-Woo (yellow card) 57'; Kang Min-Soo (yellow card) 68'	Stadium: Jeonju World Cup Stadium; Attendance: 4,051; Referee: Hee-Sun Ryu

25 November 2012 42	Jeju United	2–2	Ulsan	Jeju
15:00	Song Jin-Hyung 45+2'; Han Yong-Su (yellow card) 63'; Heo Jae-Won 65'	Summary	Kim Shin-Wook (yellow card) 19'; Go Seul-Ki 46'; Kim Young-Kwang (yellow card) 64'; Lee Seung-Yeoul 75'	Stadium: Jeju World Cup Stadium; Attendance: 11,506; Referee: Sung-Ho Kim

29 November 2012 43	Busan IPark	0–1	Ulsan	Busan
19:30	Lee Kyung-Ryul (yellow card) 19'	Summary	Rafinha 87'	Stadium: Busan Asiad Main Stadium; Attendance: 2,209; Referee: Jin-Ho Hong

2 December 2012 44	Ulsan	3–1	Gyeongnam FC	Ulsan
14:00	Kim Shin-Wook 32', 61'; Lee Jae-Seong 90'	Summary	Yun Il-Rok 43'	Stadium: Ulsan Munsu Football Stadium; Attendance: 3,552; Referee: Min-Hu Lee

==== League table ====
Pos	Team	Pld	W	D	L	GF	GA	GD	Pts	Qualification or relegation
3	Pohang Steelers	44	23	8	13	72	47	+25	77	Qualification for the Champions League (Note: Pohang Steelers finished the league in third place after qualifying for the Champions League as winners of the FA Cup: therefore, the spot given to the third-placed team was passed to the Suwon Samsung Bluewings, the fourth-placed team.)
4	Suwon Samsung Bluewings	44	20	13	11	61	51	+10	73	Qualification for the Champions League
5	Ulsan Hyundai	44	18	14	12	60	52	+8	68	
6	Jeju United	44	16	15	13	71	56	+15	63	
7	Busan IPark	44	13	14	17	40	51	−11	53	

Source: K League
Rules for classification: 1) Points; 2) Goal difference; 3) Goals scored.

==== Results summary ====
Overall								Home						Away					
Pld	W	D	L	GF	GA	GD	Pts	W	D	L	GF	GA	GD	W	D	L	GF	GA	GD
44	18	14	12	60	52	+8	68	9	8	5	34	26	+8	9	6	7	26	26	0

==== Results by round ====
Round	1	2	3	4	5	6	7	8	9	10	11	12	13	14	15	16	17	18	19	20	21	22	23	24	25	26	27	28	29	30	31	32	33	34	35	36	37	38	39	40	41	42	43	44
Ground	A	H	H	A	H	A	A	A	H	H	H	A	A	H	H	A	A	H	A	H	A	H	A	A	H	A	H	H	A	H	A	H	H	H	A	H	A	H	A	H	A	A	A	H
Result	W	W	W	L	D	W	D	W	D	W	W	L	L	L	W	L	D	W	W	D	W	W	L	D	W	W	D	L	W	D	W	D	L	D	L	L	D	L	L	D	D	D	W	W
Position	4	3	2	4	4	3	3	3	3	3	1	4	5	5	5	5	4	4	4	4	4	4	4	4	3	3	3	4	4	4	5	5	5	5	5	5	5	5	5	5	5	5	5	5

Updated to match(es) played on 2 December 2012. Source: League Fixtures and Results
A = Away; H = Home; W = Win; D = Draw; L = Loss

=== Korean FA Cup ===
23 May Round of 32	Ulsan Hyundai	1–0	Daejeon KHNP	Nam-gu, Ulsan
19:30 KST	Kim Shin-Wook 38' (Assist by No.10)			Stadium: Ulsan Munsu Football Stadium; Attendance: 1,115; Referee: Kim Hee-Gon

20 June Round of 16	Seongnam Ilhwa Chunma	1–2	Ulsan Hyundai	Seongnam, Gyeonggi
19:00 KST	Éverton 6'		Kim Shin-Wook 88' (Assist by No.14); Maranhão 90+1' (Assist by No.7)	Stadium: Tancheon Sports Complex; Attendance: 2,849; Referee: Ko Hyung-Jin

1 August Quarterfinal	Ulsan Hyundai	6–1	Goyang KB Kookmin Bank	Nam-gu, Ulsan
19:30 KST	Kim Shin-Wook 7'; Maranhão 45', 63'; Lee Keun-Ho 60'; Rafinha 84'; Go Seul-Ki 89'	Report	Lee Jae-Won 87'	Stadium: Ulsan Munsu Football Stadium

1 September Semifinal	Ulsan Hyundai	0–3	Gyeongnam FC	Nam-gu, Ulsan
19:00 KST	Lee Ho (yellow card) 16'; Lee Jae-Seong (yellow card) 66'; Kim Young-Kwang (red card) 78'	Summary	Kim In-Han 4'; Kang Seung-Jo (yellow card) 57'; Yoon Sin-Young (yellow card) 75'; Caíque 81' (pen.); Yun Il-Rok 87'	Stadium: Ulsan Munsu Football Stadium

=== AFC Champions League ===
==== Group stage (Group F) ====
Pos	Team	Pld	W	D	L	GF	GA	GD	Pts	Qualification	ULS	TOK	BBR	BEG
1	(South Korea) Ulsan Hyundai	6	4	2	0	11	7	+4	14	Advance to knockout stage	—	1–0	1–1	2–1
2	(Japan) FC Tokyo	6	3	2	1	12	6	+6	11	Advance to knockout stage	2–2	—	4–2	3–0
3	(Australia) Brisbane Roar	6	0	3	3	6	11	−5	3 (Note: Brisbane Roar and Beijing Guoan are tied on their head-to-head record (2 pts, 0 GD, 2 GF), overall goal difference and overall goals scored, and so are ranked by their fair play record (Brisbane Roar: 12 pts; Beijing Guoan: 18 pts).)		1–2	0–2	—	1–1
4	(China) Beijing Guoan	6	0	3	3	6	11	−5	3		2–3	1–1	1–1	—

Source: WorldFootball.net
Notes:

6 March Match 1	(South Korea) Ulsan Hyundai	2–1	Beijing Guoan (China)	Ulsan, South Korea
19:30 UTC+9	Kim Shin-Wook 26' (Assist by No.13); Go Seul-Ki	Report	Piao Cheng 51'	Stadium: Ulsan Munsu Football Stadium; Attendance: 1,515; Referee: Mohamed Al Zarooni (UAE)

20 March Match 2	(Japan) FC Tokyo	2–2	Ulsan Hyundai (South Korea)	Tokyo, Japan
14:00 UTC+9	Tokunaga 37'; Kajiyama 83'	Report	Kim Seung-Yong 80' (Assist by No.10); Maranhão 88' (Assist by No.5)	Stadium: National Olympic Stadium; Attendance: 14,110; Referee: Ravshan Irmatov (Uzbekistan)

4 April Match 3	(South Korea) Ulsan Hyundai	1–1	Brisbane Roar (Australia)	Ulsan, South Korea
19:30 UTC+9	Lee Jae-Seong 54' (Assist by No.20)	Report	Fitzgerald 36'; Jurman (red card) 46'	Stadium: Ulsan Munsu Football Stadium; Attendance: 1,673; Referee: Andre El Haddad (Lebanon)

17 April Match 4	(Australia) Brisbane Roar	1–2	Ulsan Hyundai (South Korea)	Brisbane, Australia
19:30 UTC+10	Stefanutto 25'	Report	Estiven 11'; Kwak Tae-Hwi 73' (pen.)	Stadium: Suncorp Stadium; Attendance: 7,200; Referee: Mohsen Torky (Iran)

2 May Match 5	(China) Beijing Guoan	2–3	Ulsan Hyundai (South Korea)	Beijing, China PR
19:30 UTC+8	Zhang Xizhe 47'; Shao Jiayi 90+2'	Report	Kim Shin-Wook 17' (Assist by No.17); Kim Seung-Yong; Maranhão 79'	Stadium: Workers Stadium; Attendance: 21,692; Referee: Abdullah Al Hilali (Oman)

16 May Match 6	(South Korea) Ulsan Hyundai	1–0	FC Tokyo (Japan)	Ulsan, South Korea
19:30 UTC+9	Kang Min-Soo 37'	Report		Stadium: Ulsan Munsu Football Stadium; Attendance: 5,746; Referee: Khalil Al Ghamdi (Saudi Arabia)

==== Knockout stage ====
30 May Round of 16	(South Korea) Ulsan Hyundai	3–2	Kashiwa Reysol (Japan)	Ulsan, South Korea
19:30 UTC+9	Kim Shin-Wook; Kondo 71' (o.g.); Lee Keun-Ho 88' (Assist by No.9)	Report	Leandro Domingues 66'; Tanaka 90+2'	Stadium: Ulsan Munsu Football Stadium; Attendance: 14,341; Referee: Mohamed Al Zarooni (UAE)

19 September Quarterfinal 1st leg	(South Korea) Ulsan Hyundai	1–0	Al-Hilal (Saudi Arabia)	Ulsan, South Korea
19:30 UTC+9	Rafinha 10'			Stadium: Ulsan Munsu Football Stadium; Attendance: 5,955; Referee: Sato Ryuji (Japan)

3 October Quarterfinal 2nd leg	(Saudi Arabia) Al-Hilal	0–4	Ulsan Hyundai (South Korea)	Riyadh, Saudi Arabia
20:10 UTC+3			Rafinha 23', 26'; Kim Shin-Wook 54'; Lee Keun-Ho 65'	Stadium: Prince Faisal bin Fahd Stadium; Attendance: 19,573; Referee: Abdulrahman Abdou (Qatar

24 October Semifinal 1st leg	(Uzbekistan) Bunyodkor	1–3	Ulsan Hyundai (South Korea)	Tashkent, Uzbekistan
19:00 UTC+5	Ibrokhimov 5'; Shorakhmedov (yellow card) 41'; Juraev (yellow card) 45'	Summary	Rafinha 31'; Kim Shin-Wook 53'; Lee Keun-Ho 72'; Kang Min-Soo (yellow card) 76'	Stadium: Bunyodkor Stadium; Attendance: 7,500; Referee: (United Arab Emirates) Ali Hamad Madhad Saif Al Badwawi

31 October Semifinal 2nd leg	(South Korea) Ulsan Hyundai	2–0 (5–1 agg.)	Bunyodkor (Uzbekistan)	Ulsan, South Korea
19:30 UTC+9	Kim Shin-Wook 53'; Lee Keun-Ho 75'	Summary	Turaev (yellow card) 79'	Stadium: Ulsan Munsu Football Stadium; Attendance: 7,864; Referee: (Bahrain) Abdulrahman Abdou

10 November Final	(South Korea) Ulsan Hyundai	3–0	Al-Ahli (Saudi Arabia)	Ulsan, South Korea
19:30 UTC+9	Kwak Tae-Hwi 13'; Rafinha 68'; Kim Seung-Yong 75'	Report		Stadium: Ulsan Munsu Football Stadium; Attendance: 42,153; Referee: Ben Williams (Australia)

=== FIFA Club World Cup ===
==== Knockout stage ====
9 December Quarterfinal	Ulsan Hyundai (South Korea)	1–3	(Mexico) Monterrey	Toyota Stadium, Toyota
16:00 UTC+9	Lee Keun-Ho 88'	Report	Corona 9'; Delgado 77', 84'	Attendance: 20,353; Referee: Cüneyt Çakır (Turkey)

12 December Match for fifth place	Ulsan Hyundai (South Korea)	2–3	(Japan) Sanfrecce Hiroshima	Toyota Stadium, Toyota
16:30 UTC+9	Mizumoto 17' (o.g.); Lee Yong 90+5'	Report	Yamagishi 35'; Satō 56', 72'	Attendance: 17,581; Referee: Nawaf Shukralla (Bahrain)

== Squad statistics ==
=== Appearances ===
Statistics accurate as of match played 27 June 2012

No.	Nat.	Pos.	Name	League		FA Cup		Champions League		Appearances		Goals
No.	Nat.	Pos.	Name	Apps	Goals	Apps	Goals	Apps	Goals	App (sub)	Total	Goals
1	(South Korea)	GK	Kim Young-Kwang	13	0	2	0	3	0	18 (0)	18	0
2	(South Korea)	DF	Lee Yong	6	0	0	0	3	0	9 (0)	9	0
3	(South Korea)	DF	Lee Jae-Seong	13 (4)	1	2	0	5 (1)	1	20 (5)	25	2
4	(South Korea)	DF	Kang Min-Soo	15 (2)	1	2	0	6	1	23 (2)	25	2
5	(South Korea)	DF	Kwak Tae-Hwi	15	1	0 (1)	0	7	1	22 (1)	23	2
6	(South Korea)	DF	Choi Sung-Hwan	0	0	0	0	0	0	0	0	0
7	(South Korea)	MF	Ko Chang-Hyun	6 (1)	1	1 (1)	0	0	0	7 (2)	9	1
8	(South Korea)	MF	Lee Ho	16	0	1 (1)	0	5 (1)	0	22 (2)	24	0
9	(South Korea)	FW	Kim Shin-Wook	11 (6)	3	2	2	4 (2)	3	17 (8)	25	8
10	(Brazil)	FW	Maranhão	5 (11)	8	1 (1)	1	3 (3)	2	9 (15)	24	11
11	(South Korea)	FW	Lee Keun-Ho	15 (2)	5	0	0	7	1	22 (2)	24	6
13	(South Korea)	MF	Kim Seung-Yong	15	2	2	0	7	2	24 (0)	24	4
14	(South Korea)	MF	Kim Young-Sam	10 (2)	0	1	0	4	0	15 (2)	17	0
15	(South Korea)	MF	Kim Dong-Suk	3 (5)	0	1 (1)	0	1 (2)	0	5 (8)	13	0
16	(South Korea)	FW	Park Seung-Il	0 (2)	0	0	0	0 (2)	0	0 (4)	4	0
17	(South Korea)	MF	Go Seul-Ki	14 (1)	2	2	0	6	1	22 (1)	23	3
18	(South Korea)	GK	Kim Seung-Gyu	5	0	0	0	4	0	9 (0)	9	0
19	(Brazil)	FW	Rafinha	0	0	0	0	0	0	0	0	0
20	(Colombia)	MF	Julián Estiven Vélez	17 (1)	0	1	0	7	1	25 (1)	26	1
21	(South Korea)	FW	Lee Seung-Yeoul	0	0	0	0	0	0	0	0	0
22	(South Korea)	DF	Choi Bo-Kyung	0 (1)	0	0	0	0	0	0 (1)	1	0
23	(South Korea)	FW	Kim Da-Bin	0	0	0	0	0	0	0	0	0
24	(South Korea)	DF	Lim Chang-Woo	0	0	0	0	0	0	0	0	0
25	(South Korea)	MF	Choi Jin-soo	0	0	0	0	0	0	0	0	0
27	(South Korea)	DF	Kang Jin-Wook	5	0	2	0	1 (1)	0	8 (1)	9	0
28	(South Korea)	DF	Kim Chi-Gon	0	0	0	0	0	0	0	0	0
29	(South Korea)	MF	Kim Yong-Tae	0	0	0	0	0	0	0	0	0
30	(South Korea)	DF	Jung Woon	0	0	0	0	0	0	0	0	0
31	(South Korea)	GK	Jeon Hong-Suk	0	0	0	0	0	0	0	0	0
32	(South Korea)	FW	Park Kyung-Ik	0	0	0	0	0	0	0	0	0
33	(South Korea)	MF	Min Hoon-Gi	0	0	0	0	0	0	0	0	0
34	(South Korea)	DF	Yoon Jung-Min	0	0	0	0	0	0	0	0	0
35	(South Korea)	GK	Lee Hee-Sung	0	0	0	0	0	0	0	0	0
37	(South Korea)	FW	Park Dong-Hyuk	0	0	0	0	0	0	0	0	0
39	(South Korea)	MF	Lee Dong-Hyun	0	0	0	0	0	0	0	0	0
6	(South Korea)	DF	Choi Jae-Soo (out)	8 (3)	1	1	0	2 (2)	0	11 (5)	16	1
19	(South Korea)	MF	Byun Woong (loan out)	0	0	0	0	0	0	0	0	0
21	(South Korea)	FW	Kim Hyo-Gi (loan out)	1 (1)	0	0	0	0 (2)	0	1 (3)	4	0
26	(South Korea)	MF	Kim Jong-Gook (loan out)	0	0	0	0	0	0	0	0	0
28	(Japan)	MF	Akihiro Ienaga (out)	5 (5)	1	1 (1)	0	2 (3)	0	8 (9)	17	1
29	(South Korea)	MF	Kim Seo-Joon (out)	0	0	0	0	0	0	0	0	0
38	(South Korea)	FW	Jung Jang-Hoon (out)	0	0	0	0	0	0	0	0	0
40	(South Korea)	DF	Kim Nam-Geol (out)	0	0	0	0	0	0	0	0	0

=== Goals and assists ===
Rank	Nation	Number	Name	K-League		KFA Cup		Champions League		Sum		Total
Rank	Nation	Number	Name	Goals	Assists	Goals	Assists	Goals	Assists	Goals	Assists	Total
1	(Brazil)	10	Maranhão	8	1	1	1	2	1	11	3	14
2	(South Korea)	9	Kim Shin-Wook	3	1	2	0	3	1	8	2	10
=	(South Korea)	11	Lee Keun-Ho	5	1	0	0	1	3	6	4	10
=	(South Korea)	17	Go Seul-Ki	2	6	0	0	1	1	3	7	10
3	(South Korea)	13	Kim Seung-Yong	2	1	0	0	2	1	4	2	6
4	(South Korea)	5	Kwak Tae-Hwi	1	0	0	0	1	1	2	1	3
=	(South Korea)	7	Ko Chang-Hyun	1	1	0	1	0	0	1	2	3
=	(South Korea)	14	Kim Young-Sam	0	2	0	1	0	0	0	3	3
5	(South Korea)	3	Lee Jae-Seong	1	0	0	0	1	0	2	0	2
=	(South Korea)	4	Kang Min-Soo	1	0	0	0	1	0	2	0	2
=	(South Korea)	6	Choi Jae-Soo	1	1	0	0	0	0	1	1	2
=	(Colombia)	20	Julián Estiven Vélez	0	0	0	0	1	1	1	1	2
6	(Japan)	28	Akihiro Ienaga	1	0	0	0	0	0	1	0	1
=	(South Korea)	27	Kang Jin-Wook	0	1	0	0	0	0	0	1	1
/	/	/	Own Goals	0	-	0	-	1	-	1	-	1
/	/	/	TOTALS	26	15	3	3	14	9	43	27	

=== Discipline ===
Position	Nation	Number	Name	K-League		KFA Cup		Champions League		Total	
Position	Nation	Number	Name	Yellow card	Red card	Yellow card	Red card	Yellow card	Red card	Yellow card	Red card
GK	(South Korea)	1	Kim Young-Kwang	2	0	0	0	0	0	2	0
DF	(South Korea)	2	Lee Yong	1	0	0	0	0	0	1	0
DF	(South Korea)	3	Lee Jae-Seong	2	0	0	0	0	0	2	0
DF	(South Korea)	4	Kang Min-Soo	4	0	1	0	2	0	7	0
DF	(South Korea)	5	Kwak Tae-Hwi	3	0	0	0	0	0	3	0
MF	(South Korea)	7	Ko Chang-Hyun	0	0	1	0	0	0	1	0
DF	(South Korea)	8	Lee Ho	4	0	0	0	2	0	6	0
FW	(South Korea)	9	Kim Shin-Wook	1	0	0	0	1	0	2	0
FW	(Brazil)	10	Maranhão	1	0	0	0	0	0	1	0
FW	(South Korea)	11	Lee Keun-Ho	2	0	0	0	0	0	2	0
MF	(South Korea)	13	Kim Seung-Yong	2	0	0	0	0	0	2	0
MF	(South Korea)	14	Kim Young-Sam	2	0	0	0	1	0	3	0
MF	(South Korea)	17	Go Seul-Ki	1	0	0	0	1	0	2	0
DF	(South Korea)	27	Kang Jin-Wook	3	0	0	0	0	0	3	0
MF	(Japan)	28	Akihiro Ienaga	1	0	0	0	2	0	3	0
/	/	/	TOTALS	29	0	2	0	9	0	40	0

== Honours ==
=== Club ===
- AFC Champions League Champions, Fair Play Award

=== Individual ===
- AFC Champions League MVP: (South Korea) Lee Keun-Ho
- AFC Footballer of the Year: (South Korea) Lee Keun-Ho
- AFC Coach of the Year: (South Korea) Kim Ho-Gon
