= 2012 FIFA Club World Cup squads =

== Al Ahly ==
Manager: (Egypt) Hossam El-Badry

Note: Flags indicate national team as defined under FIFA eligibility rules; some limited exceptions apply. Players may hold more than one non-FIFA nationality.

No.	Pos.	Nation	Player
1	GK	EGY	Sherif Ekramy
2	DF	EGY	Saad Samir
3	DF	EGY	Ramy Rabia
4	DF	EGY	Sherif Abdel-Fadil
5	MF	EGY	Shehab El-Din Ahmed
6	DF	EGY	Wael Gomaa
8	FW	EGY	Mohamed Barakat
9	FW	EGY	Emad Moteab
11	FW	EGY	Walid Soliman
12	DF	EGY	Ahmad Shedid Qinawi
13	GK	EGY	Ahmed Adel Abd El-Moneam
14	MF	EGY	Hossam Ghaly (captain)

No.	Pos.	Nation	Player
15	FW	EGY	Gedo
16	GK	EGY	Mahmoud Abou El-Saoud
17	DF	EGY	Sayed Moawad
18	FW	EGY	Al-Sayed Hamdy
19	MF	EGY	Abdallah El Said
22	MF	EGY	Mohamed Aboutrika
23	DF	EGY	Mohamed Nagieb
24	DF	EGY	Ahmed Fathy
25	MF	EGY	Hossam Ashour
26	FW	MTN	Dominique Da Silva
27	FW	EGY	Trezeguet

== Auckland City ==
Manager: (Spain) Ramon Tribulietx

Note: Flags indicate national team as defined under FIFA eligibility rules; some limited exceptions apply. Players may hold more than one non-FIFA nationality.

No.	Pos.	Nation	Player
1	GK	NZL	Jacob Spoonley
2	DF	NZL	Simon Arms
3	DF	JPN	Takuya Iwata
4	DF	NZL	Riki Van Steeden
5	DF	ESP	Ángel Berlanga
6	MF	NZL	Jason Hicks
7	DF	NZL	James Pritchett
8	MF	WAL	Chris Bale
9	FW	ESP	Manel Expósito
10	FW	CRC	Luis Corrales
11	MF	NZL	Daniel Koprivcic

No.	Pos.	Nation	Player
12	GK	NZL	Tamati Williams
13	MF	NZL	Alex Feneridis
14	FW	ENG	Adam Dickinson
15	DF	NZL	Ivan Vicelich (captain)
16	MF	ESP	Albert Riera
17	MF	ESP	Pedro
18	GK	NZL	Liam Anderson
19	MF	NZL	Daniel Saric
20	FW	ARG	Emiliano Tade
21	MF	PNG	David Browne
22	DF	NZL	Andrew Milne

== Chelsea ==
Manager: (Spain) Rafael Benítez

Note: Flags indicate national team as defined under FIFA eligibility rules; some limited exceptions apply. Players may hold more than one non-FIFA nationality.

No.	Pos.	Nation	Player
1	GK	CZE	Petr Čech (captain)
2	DF	SRB	Branislav Ivanović
3	DF	ENG	Ashley Cole
4	DF	BRA	David Luiz
7	MF	BRA	Ramires
8	MF	ENG	Frank Lampard
9	FW	ESP	Fernando Torres
10	MF	ESP	Juan Mata
11	MF	BRA	Oscar
12	MF	NGA	Mikel John Obi
13	FW	NGA	Victor Moses
17	MF	BEL	Eden Hazard

No.	Pos.	Nation	Player
19	DF	POR	Paulo Ferreira
21	MF	GER	Marko Marin
22	GK	ENG	Ross Turnbull
23	FW	ENG	Daniel Sturridge
24	DF	ENG	Gary Cahill
26	DF	ENG	~~John Terry~~
28	DF	ESP	César Azpilicueta
34	DF	ENG	Ryan Bertrand
35	FW	BRA	Lucas Piazon
40	GK	POR	Hilário
56	MF	ENG	George Saville

== Monterrey ==
Manager: (Mexico) Víctor Manuel Vucetich

Note: Flags indicate national team as defined under FIFA eligibility rules; some limited exceptions apply. Players may hold more than one non-FIFA nationality.

No.	Pos.	Nation	Player
1	GK	MEX	Jonathan Orozco
2	DF	MEX	Severo Meza
3	DF	MEX	Luis López
4	DF	MEX	Ricardo Osorio
5	DF	MEX	Darvin Chávez
6	DF	MEX	Héctor Morales
7	MF	MEX	Edgar Solís
8	MF	MEX	Gerardo Moreno
9	FW	MEX	Aldo de Nigris
10	FW	MEX	Luis Madrigal
11	DF	ECU	Walter Ayoví
12	GK	MEX	Jesús Dautt

No.	Pos.	Nation	Player
13	FW	MEX	Abraham Carreño
14	MF	MEX	Jesús Manuel Corona
15	DF	ARG	José María Basanta (captain)
18	MF	ARG	Neri Cardozo
19	FW	ARG	César Delgado
20	DF	MEX	Óscar García Carmona
21	DF	MEX	Hiram Mier
23	GK	MEX	Juan de Dios Ibarra
24	DF	MEX	Sergio Pérez
26	FW	CHI	Humberto Suazo
59	FW	MEX	Salvador Jasso

== Corinthians ==
Manager: (Brazil) Tite

Note: Flags indicate national team as defined under FIFA eligibility rules; some limited exceptions apply. Players may hold more than one non-FIFA nationality.

No.	Pos.	Nation	Player
1	GK	BRA	Júlio César
2	DF	BRA	Alessandro (captain)
3	DF	BRA	Chicão
4	DF	BRA	Wallace
5	MF	BRA	Ralf
6	DF	BRA	Fábio Santos
7	FW	ARG	Juan Manuel Martínez
8	MF	BRA	Paulinho
9	FW	PER	Paolo Guerrero
10	MF	BRA	Douglas
11	FW	QAT	Emerson
12	GK	BRA	Cássio

No.	Pos.	Nation	Player
13	DF	BRA	Paulo André
15	DF	BRA	Ânderson Polga
17	DF	BRA	Willian Arão
20	MF	BRA	Danilo
21	MF	BRA	Edenílson
22	GK	BRA	Danilo Fernandes
23	MF	BRA	Jorge Henrique
26	DF	BRA	Guilherme Andrade
28	DF	BRA	Felipe
29	MF	BRA	Giovanni
31	FW	BRA	Romarinho

== Sanfrecce Hiroshima ==
Manager: (Japan) Hajime Moriyasu

Note: Flags indicate national team as defined under FIFA eligibility rules; some limited exceptions apply. Players may hold more than one non-FIFA nationality.

No.	Pos.	Nation	Player
1	GK	JPN	Shusaku Nishikawa
2	DF	KOR	Hwang Seok-ho
4	DF	JPN	Hiroki Mizumoto
5	DF	JPN	Kazuhiko Chiba
6	MF	JPN	Toshihiro Aoyama
7	MF	JPN	Kōji Morisaki
8	MF	JPN	Kazuyuki Morisaki
9	FW	JPN	Naoki Ishihara
11	FW	JPN	Hisato Satō (captain)
13	GK	JPN	Takuya Masuda
14	MF	CRO	Mihael Mikić
15	MF	JPN	Yojiro Takahagi

No.	Pos.	Nation	Player
16	MF	JPN	Satoru Yamagishi
18	FW	JPN	Ryuichi Hirashige
20	MF	JPN	Hironori Ishikawa
21	GK	JPN	Yutaro Hara
22	DF	JPN	Tsubasa Yokotake
24	DF	JPN	Ryota Moriwaki
25	FW	JPN	Junya Osaki
27	MF	JPN	Kohei Shimizu
30	DF	JPN	Shinji Tsujio
33	DF	JPN	Tsukasa Shiotani
35	MF	JPN	Koji Nakajima

== Ulsan Hyundai ==
Manager: (South Korea) Kim Ho-kon

Note: Flags indicate national team as defined under FIFA eligibility rules; some limited exceptions apply. Players may hold more than one non-FIFA nationality.

No.	Pos.	Nation	Player
1	GK	KOR	Kim Young-kwang
2	DF	KOR	Lee Yong
3	DF	KOR	Lee Jae-sung
5	DF	KOR	Kwak Tae-hwi (captain)
7	MF	KOR	Ko Chang-hyun
8	MF	KOR	Lee Ho
9	FW	KOR	Kim Shin-wook
10	FW	BRA	Maranhão
11	FW	KOR	Lee Keun-ho
13	MF	KOR	Kim Seung-yong
14	MF	KOR	Kim Young-sam
15	MF	KOR	Kim Dong-suk

No.	Pos.	Nation	Player
17	MF	KOR	Go Seul-ki
18	GK	KOR	Kim Seung-gyu
19	FW	BRA	Rafinha
20	MF	COL	Julián Estiven Vélez
21	FW	KOR	Lee Seung-yeoul
22	DF	KOR	Choi Bo-kyung
24	DF	KOR	Rim Chang-woo
25	MF	KOR	Choi Jin-soo
27	DF	KOR	Kang Jin-wook
28	MF	KOR	Kim Yong-tae
31	GK	KOR	Chun Hong-suk
