= 2012 AFC Champions League final =

- Event: 2012 AFC Champions League
Ulsan Hyundai	Al-Ahli
(South Korea)	(Saudi Arabia)
3	0
- Date: 10 November 2012
- Venue: Ulsan Munsu Football Stadium, Ulsan
- AFC Man of the Match: Kwak Tae-hwi (Ulsan Hyundai)
- Fans' Man of the Match: Kim Seung-yong (Ulsan Hyundai)
- Referee: Ben Williams (Australia)
- Attendance: 42,153
- Weather: Clear; 15 °C (59 °F); 50% humidity

The 2012 AFC Champions League final was a football match which was played on Saturday, 10 November 2012, to determine the champion of the 2012 AFC Champions League. It was the final of the 31st edition of the top-level Asian club tournament organized by the Asian Football Confederation (AFC), and the 10th under the current AFC Champions League title.

The match was played between Ulsan Hyundai from Korea Republic and Al-Ahli from Saudi Arabia. Ulsan Hyundai won 3–0 to win their first title. As Asian champions, Ulsan Hyundai qualified to represent the AFC at the 2012 FIFA Club World Cup in Japan, entering at the quarter-finals.

== Qualified teams ==
Team	Previous finals appearances (bold indicates winners)
(South Korea) Ulsan Hyundai	None
(Saudi Arabia) Al-Ahli	1986

== Venue ==
The AFC decided that the final would be hosted by one of the finalists. On 14 June 2012, the draw for the quarter-finals, semi-finals and final was made. For the final, the winner of semi-final 2 (played between the winners of quarter-finals 3 and 4) would be the home team, while the winner of semi-final 1 (played between the winners of quarter-finals 1 and 2) would be the away team. As a result, Ulsan Hyundai are the home team, and Al-Ahli are the away team.

The match was played at Ulsan Hyundai's home stadium, Ulsan Munsu Football Stadium, at Ulsan, South Korea. It was one of the stadiums used at the 2002 FIFA World Cup.

== Road to final ==
(South Korea) Ulsan Hyundai				Round	(Saudi Arabia) Al-Ahli			
Bye				Qualifying play-off	Bye			
Opponent	Result			Group stage	Opponent	Result		
(China) Beijing Guoan	2–1 (H)			Matchday 1	(Qatar) Lekhwiya	0–1 (A)		
(Japan) FC Tokyo	2–2 (A)			Matchday 2	(Iran) Sepahan	1–1 (H)		
(Australia) Brisbane Roar	1–1 (H)			Matchday 3	(United Arab Emirates) Al-Nasr	2–1 (A)		
(Australia) Brisbane Roar	2–1 (A)			Matchday 4	(United Arab Emirates) Al-Nasr	3–1 (H)		
(China) Beijing Guoan	3–2 (A)			Matchday 5	(Qatar) Lekhwiya	3–0 (H)		
(Japan) FC Tokyo	1–0 (H)			Matchday 6	(Iran) Sepahan	1–2 (A)		
**Group F winner**: Team / Pld / W / D / L / GF / GA / GD / Pts; (South Korea) **Ulsan Hyundai** / 6 / 4 / 2 / 0 / 11 / 7 / +4 / **14**; (Japan) FC Tokyo / 6 / 3 / 2 / 1 / 12 / 6 / +6 / **11**; (Australia) Brisbane Roar / 6 / 0 / 3 / 3 / 6 / 11 / −5 / **3**; (China) Beijing Guoan / 6 / 0 / 3 / 3 / 6 / 11 / −5 / **3**				Final standings	**Group C runner-up**: Team / Pld / W / D / L / GF / GA / GD / Pts; (Iran) Sepahan / 6 / 4 / 1 / 1 / 9 / 4 / +5 / **13**; (Saudi Arabia) **Al-Ahli** / 6 / 3 / 1 / 2 / 10 / 6 / +4 / **10**; (United Arab Emirates) Al-Nasr / 6 / 2 / 0 / 4 / 6 / 11 / −5 / **6**; (Qatar) Lekhwiya / 6 / 2 / 0 / 4 / 5 / 9 / −4 / **6**			
Opponent	Agg.	1st leg	2nd leg	Knockout stage	Opponent	Agg.	1st leg	2nd leg
(Japan) Kashiwa Reysol	3–2 (H) (one-leg match)			Round of 16	(United Arab Emirates) Al-Jazira	3–3 (aet) (4–2 p) (A) (one-leg match)		
(Saudi Arabia) Al-Hilal	5–0	1–0 (H)	4–0 (A)	Quarterfinals	(Iran) Sepahan	4–1	0–0 (A)	4–1 (H)
(Uzbekistan) Bunyodkor	5–1	3–1 (A)	2–0 (H)	Semifinals	(Saudi Arabia) Al-Ittihad	2–1	0–1 (A)	2–0 (H)

== Summary ==
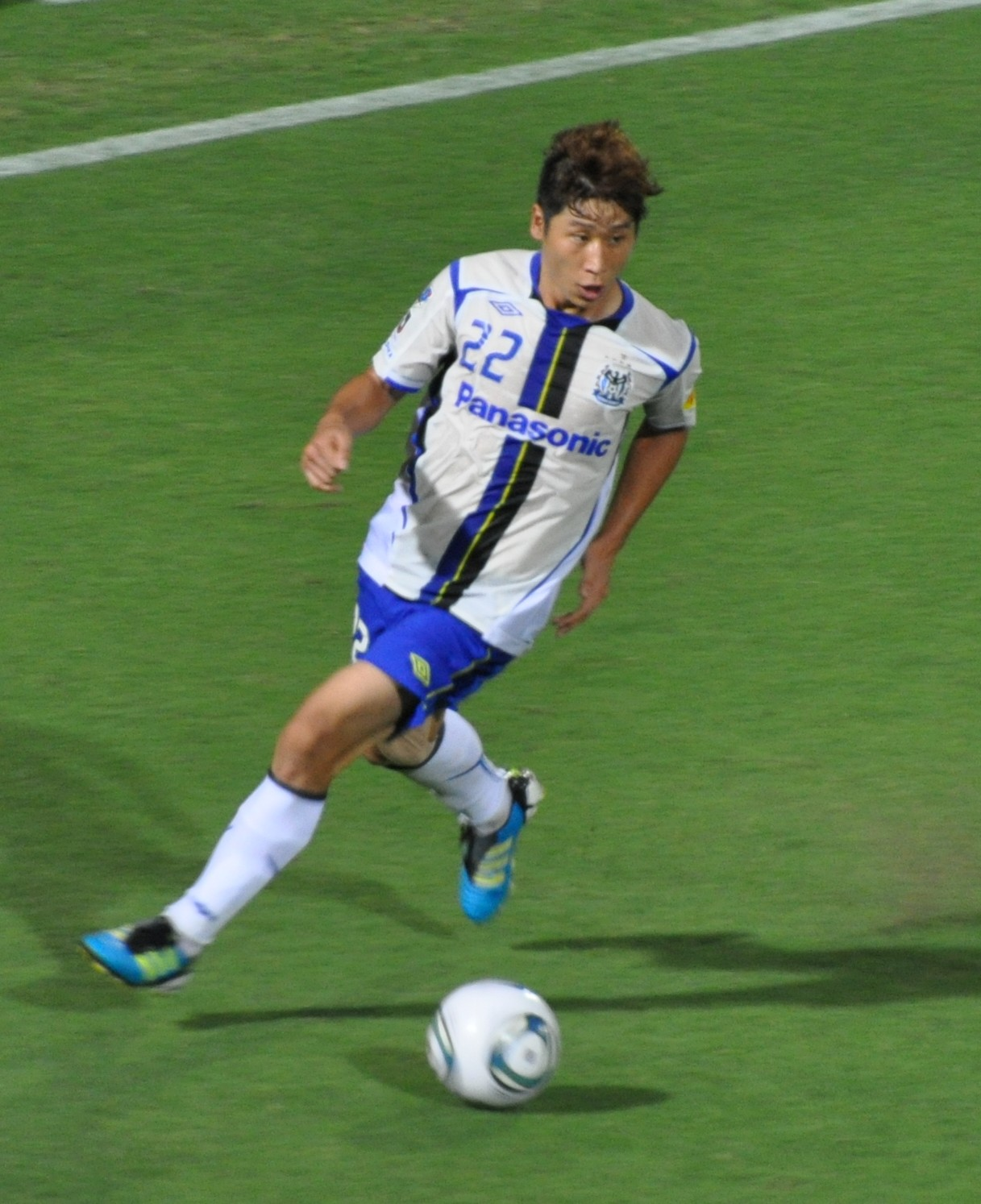
Lee Keun-Ho was named as MVP of the tournament.

Ulsan Hyundai became the third K-League club in four years to be crowned Asian champions with a 3-0 win over Al Ahli of Saudi Arabia in the final of the AFC Champions League at Ulsan Munsu Stadium on Saturday with goals from captain Kwak Tae-Hwi, Brazilian striker Rafael dos Santos de Oliveira (Rafinha) and Kim Seung-Yong learned last year's K-League Cup winners their first-ever continental crown and a place at next month's FIFA Club World Cup in Japan. Ulsan were the fourth Korean side in a row to reach the final and Kim Ho-gon's team join Pohang Steelers and Seongnam Ilhwa Chunma in lifting the title after their successes in 2009 and 2010 respectively. The win was nothing less than Ulsan deserved against an Al Ahli side who were also making their first appearance in the final of the AFC Champions League but who appeared overawed by the occasion. Ulsan took command early on with Rafinha firing off an effort from the edge of the area seven minutes in while Kwak headed Kim Seung-yong's corner wide three minutes later. It only took a further three minutes, though, for the Korean side to go in front with Ulsan's prowess from set pieces paying dividends when Kim Seung-yong flicked a free kick into the area and Kwak rose highest to head past Abdullah Al Muaiof. The goal did little to wake Al Ahli out of their slumber and, although the time spent in the Ulsan half increased, Karel Jarolim's team did little to make it count. It was at the other end that the majority of the action continued, with Ulsan's Colombian midfielder Juan Estiven Velez trying his luck from range twice in the space of three minutes, but both his efforts were off target. Indeed, it was Ulsan's complacency at the back that threatened to allow Al Ahli back into the game as the home side gave away possession too easily on several occasions, but only Motaz Al Mosa went close to testing Kim Young-kwang when he shot over the bar with seven minutes left in the half. Al Ahli shook off some of the lethargy that had hampered their play in the opening 45 minutes, but Ulsan still remained in the ascendancy and, by the 67th minute, they had doubled their lead. Velez's left footed cross from the right was headed across goal by Kim Shin-wook and Rafinha emerged through a trio of Al Ahli defenders to poke the ball over the line and to send most of the 42,153 fans in Ulsan Munsu Stadium into raptures. And eight minutes later Kim Seung-yong confirmed the title would be heading back to Korea with a fierce low left-foot drive that Al Muaiouf could do little to keep out.

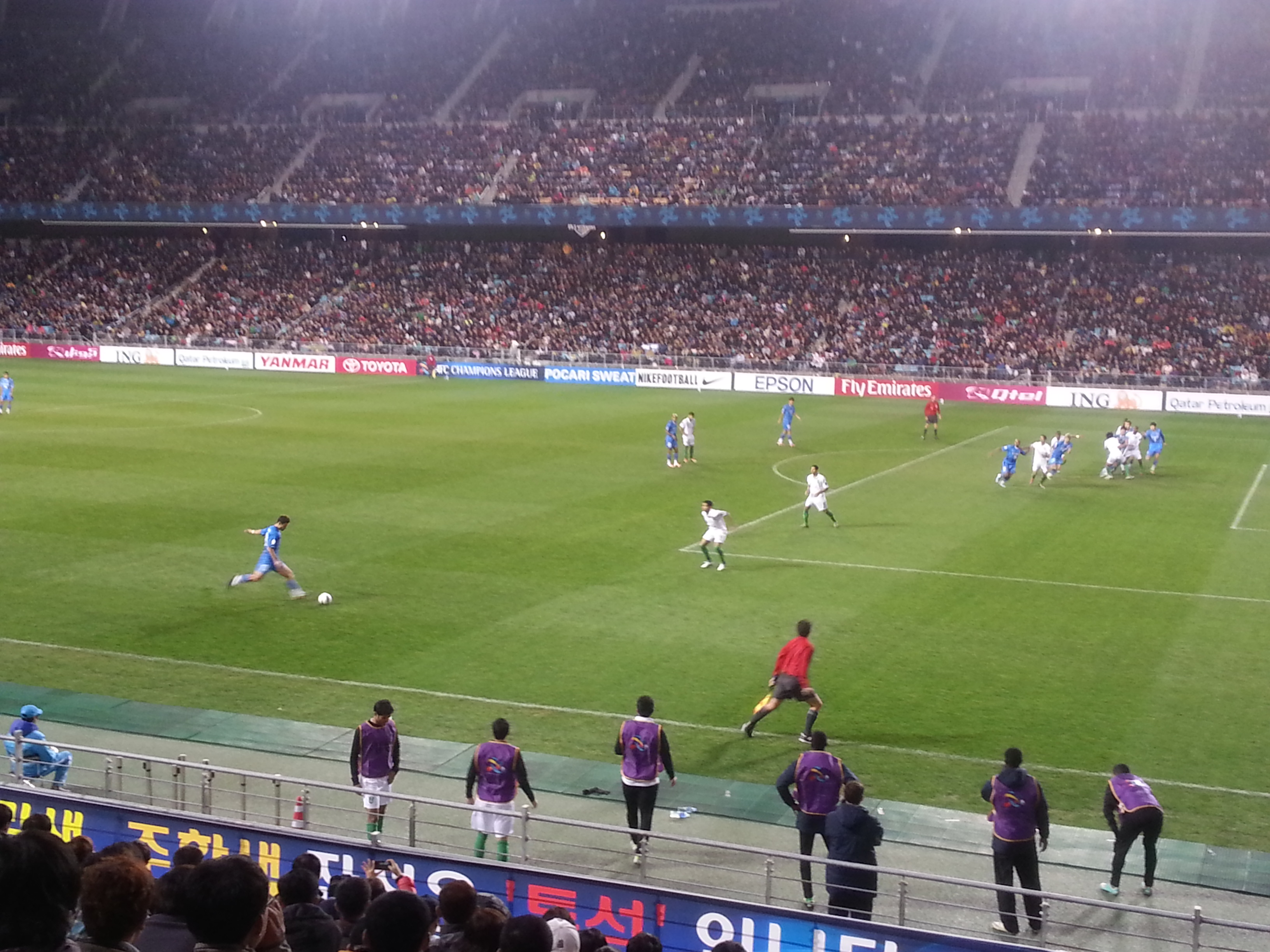
2012 AFC Champions League Final in Ulsan Munsu Football Stadium.

Winning head coach, Kim Ho-Gon hailed Ulsan Hyundai's historic maiden AFC Champions League: "Ulsan have had to wait for a long time to come to final so I told the players we must win the game and to do that we must play a normal game," said Ulsan coach Kim Ho-gon. "The players created a lot of pressure in the first half and all of the players played their part." Ulsan were always in control of the contest despite Al Ahli improving after Kwak's 13th-minute header from Kim Seung-yong's free-kick and after Rafinha's fifth goal in as many games seven minutes after the hour mark, Kim Seung-yong sealed the win in spectacular fashion with 15 minutes remaining as Ulsan netted their 27th goal of the campaign. "After the first goal the players felt they could win and they made some mistakes and allowed Al Ahli to create some attacks," added Kim Ho-gon, At half-time I talked to the players and the second half was very good." Having won their group with an unbeaten record ahead of Japan's FC Tokyo, Ulsan edged out J.League champions Kashiwa Reysol 3-2 in the Round of 16 to maintain Korean interest in the competition and Ulsan bettered their 2006 run to the semi-finals with wins over Saudi Arabia's Al Hilal and Uzbekistan's Bunyodkor in the knockout stage. "After the first group game every game felt like a final, but the final did not feel like a final as we had done so well in the semi-final," added Kim Ho-gon. Having won the AFC Champions League title for the first, Ulsan have also earned an appearance at next month's FIFA Club World Cup in Japan with Kim Ho-gon's side set to meet Mexico's Monterrey in the quarter-finals. "I am so happy for the players," added Kim Ho-gon. "They wanted to play in the FIFA Club World Cup and it is the same for me. This is the happiest day in my coaching career."

A despondent Karel Jarolim poured praise on the players of Ulsan Hyundai: "Maybe we are expecting a lot from the players and it's true they didn't perform well, but it's not because they didn't want to but because Ulsan are a strong team and they played well," said Jarolim. "Most of the players did their best but Ulsan are strong and they deserved to win. This is football." Al Ahli went behind after just 13 minutes, when Kwak scored with a header, but with the Saudi side unable to pull themselves back into the game, Rafinha's strike midway through the second half all but killed the game before Kim put the seal on the victory. "After the first goal I think we created a few chances to score at least one goal in the first half, but the strikers didn't score and they didn't work with the ball very well," said Jarolim. "I was planning to make some changes in the second half but I was surprised when Ulsan scored and after that I thought our players lost their concentration and didn't focus well on the match. Ulsan controlled the ball and won the match." While Ulsan may be champions, the Korean side are unlikely to qualify for next year's competition given their poor showing in the latter stages of the K-League's championship round, but Al Ahli have already booked their spot in the 2013 edition by finishing second in last year's Saudi Professional League. Jarolim is hoping his players have learned lessons from their run to this year's final that they can put in place for the 2013 campaign. "The team learned a lot this year by playing against different strong teams," said the coach. "Al Ahli is a very young team and these players have gained experience this season and they will work hard for next year and will try to do our best."

== Match details ==
10 November 2012
19:30 UTC+09:00

Ulsan Hyundai (South Korea)	3–0	(Saudi Arabia) Al-Ahli
Kwak Tae-hwi 13'; Rafinha 68'; Kim Seung-yong 75'	Report

Ulsan Munsu Football Stadium, Ulsan
Attendance: 42,153
Referee: Ben Williams (Australia)

**Ulsan Hyundai**	**Al-Ahli**

**Ulsan Hyundai: 4–4–2**
GK	1	(South Korea) Kim Young-Kwang
DF	2	(South Korea) Lee Yong
DF	4	(South Korea) Kang Min-Soo	(yellow card) 31'
DF	5	(South Korea) Kwak Tae-Hwi (c)
DF	14	(South Korea) Kim Young-Sam		(substituted off) 68'
MF	8	(South Korea) Lee Ho		(substituted off) 46'
MF	13	(South Korea) Kim Seung-Yong
MF	20	(Colombia) Julián Estiven Vélez
FW	9	(South Korea) Kim Shin-Wook
FW	11	(South Korea) Lee Keun-Ho
FW	19	(Brazil) Rafinha	(yellow card) 79'	(substituted off) 88'
**Substitutes**
GK	18	(South Korea) Kim Seung-Gyu
DF	3	(South Korea) Lee Jae-Seong		(substituted on) 68'
DF	22	(South Korea) Choi Bo-Kyung
MF	7	(South Korea) Ko Chang-Hyun
MF	17	(South Korea) Go Seul-Ki		(substituted on) 46'
FW	10	(Brazil) Maranhão		(substituted on) 88'
FW	21	(South Korea) Lee Seung-Yeoul
**Manager**
(South Korea) Kim Ho-Gon

**Al-Ahli: 4-3-3**
GK	22	(Saudi Arabia) Abdullah Al-Mayouf
DF	2	(Saudi Arabia) Kamel Al-Mor
DF	4	(Saudi Arabia) Waleed Bakshween		(substituted off) 71'
DF	16	(Saudi Arabia) Haider Al-Amer
DF	21	(Saudi Arabia) Ageel Balghaith
DF	47	(Saudi Arabia) Mustafa Al-Bassas	(yellow card) 90+2'
MF	3	(Colombia) Jairo Palomino
MF	5	(Saudi Arabia) Moataz Al-Musa	(yellow card) 66'	(substituted off) 72'
MF	8	(Saudi Arabia) Taisir Al-Jassim (c)		(substituted off) 86'
FW	7	(Brazil) Victor Simões
FW	20	(Oman) Amad Al Hosni
**Substitutes**
GK	1	(Saudi Arabia) Yasser Al Mosailem
DF	28	(Saudi Arabia) Jufain Al-Bishi
MF	10	(Argentina) Diego Alberto Morales		(substituted on) 86'
MF	14	(Saudi Arabia) Mohammad Massad
MF	24	(Saudi Arabia) Abdulrahim Jaizawi		(substituted on) 71'
MF	26	(Saudi Arabia) Mohsen Al-Eisa		(substituted on) 72'
FW	11	(Saudi Arabia) Essa Al-Mehyani
**Manager**
(Czech Republic) Karel Jarolím

AFC's Man of the Match:
Kwak Tae-Hwi (South Korea)

Assistant referees:
Luke Brennan (Australia)
Paul Cetrangolo (Australia)
Fourth official:
Strebre Delovski (Australia)

**Match rules**

- 90 minutes.
- 30 minutes of extra time if necessary.
- Penalty shoot-out if scores still level.
- Seven named substitutes.
- Maximum of three substitutions.

=== Statistics ===
First half
	Ulsan Hyundai	Al-Ahli
Goals scored	1	0
Total shots	7	1
Shots on target	5	0
Saves	1	2
Ball possession	60%	40%
Corner kicks	3	2
Fouls committed	5	12
Offsides	1	0
Yellow cards	1	0
Red cards	0	0

Second half
	Ulsan Hyundai	Al-Ahli
Goals scored	2	0
Total shots	16	8
Shots on target	10	2
Saves	1	0
Ball possession	50%	50%
Corner kicks	2	3
Fouls committed	5	5
Offsides	2	0
Yellow cards	1	2
Red cards	0	0

Overall
	Ulsan Hyundai	Al-Ahli
Goals scored	3	0
Total shots	23	9
Shots on target	15	2
Saves	2	2
Ball possession	55%	45%
Corner kicks	5	5
Fouls committed	10	17
Offsides	3	0
Yellow cards	2	2
Red cards	0	0
