= Jin-wook =

- Hangul: 진욱
- RR: Jinuk
- MR: Chinuk

Jin-wook is a Korean given name.

People with this name include:

- Kang Jin-wook (born 1986), South Korean footballer
- Kim Jin-wook (born 1960), South Korean baseball manager
- Lee Jin-wook (born 1981), South Korean actor
- Suk Jin-wook (born 1976), South Korean volleyball player

Fictional characters with this name include:

- Choi Jin-wook, in 2011 South Korean television series Baby Faced Beauty
- Han Jin-wook, in 2013 South Korean television series Good Doctor
- Seo Jin-wook, in 2013 South Korean television series You Are the Best!

== See also ==
- List of Korean given names
