= 2012 AFC Champions League knockout stage =

Football tournament knockout stage

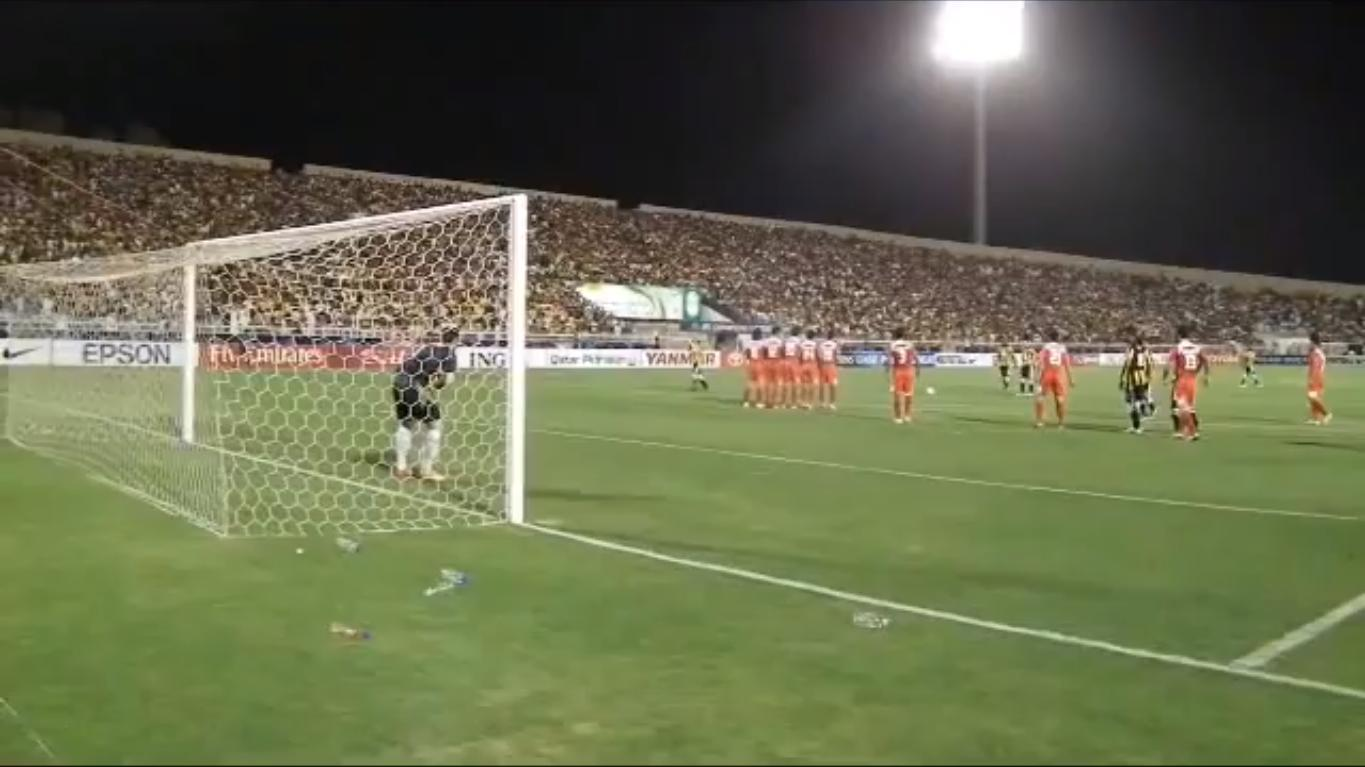
Free kick for Al-Ittihad (2004 & 2005 AFC winner) against Persepolis. That match ended 3-0.

The 2012 AFC Champions League knockout stage was contested by a total of 16 teams (8 from West Zone and 8 from East Zone). They included the 8 group winners and the 8 group runners-up from the group stage.

Each round of this single-elimination tournament was played over one or two matches. In the round of 16, each tie was played in one match, hosted by the winners of each group against the runners-up of another group. In the quarter-finals and semi-finals, each tie was played over two legs on a home-and-away basis. The final was hosted by one of the finalists, decided by draw. The away goals rule (for two-legged ties), extra time (away goals do not apply in extra time) and penalty shootout would be used to decide the winner if necessary.

The matchups for the round of 16 were decided based on the results from the group stage. After the completion of the round of 16, the draw for the quarter-finals, semi-finals, and final was held at the AFC house in Kuala Lumpur, Malaysia on 14 June 2012, 16:00 UTC+08:00. In this draw, the "country protection" rule was applied: if there are exactly two clubs from the same country, they may not face each other in the quarter-finals; however, if there are more than two clubs from the same country, they may face each other in the quarter-finals.

== Qualified teams ==
Group	Winners	Runners-up
A	(United Arab Emirates) Al-Jazira	(Iran) Esteghlal
B	(Saudi Arabia) Al-Ittihad	(United Arab Emirates) Baniyas
C	(Iran) Sepahan	(Saudi Arabia) Al-Ahli
D	(Saudi Arabia) Al-Hilal	(Iran) Persepolis
E	(Australia) Adelaide United	(Uzbekistan) Bunyodkor
F	(South Korea) Ulsan Hyundai	(Japan) FC Tokyo
G	(South Korea) Seongnam Ilhwa Chunma	(Japan) Nagoya Grampus
H	(China) Guangzhou Evergrande	(Japan) Kashiwa Reysol

== Bracket ==
While the bracket below shows the entire knockout stage, the draw for the round of 16 matches was determined at the time of the group draw, and kept teams from West Zone and East Zone completely separate for that round.

The draw for the quarter-finals and beyond was held separately, after the conclusion of the round of 16.

Round of 16
(Australia) Adelaide United	1
(Japan) Nagoya Grampus	0
(South Korea) Seongnam Ilhwa Chunma	0
(Uzbekistan) Bunyodkor	1
(South Korea) Ulsan Hyundai	3
(Japan) Kashiwa Reysol	2
(Saudi Arabia) Al-Hilal	7
(United Arab Emirates) Baniyas	1
(Saudi Arabia) Al-Ittihad	3
(Iran) Persepolis	0
(China) Guangzhou Evergrande	1
(Japan) FC Tokyo	0
(Iran) Sepahan	2
(Iran) Esteghlal	0
(United Arab Emirates) Al-Jazira	3 (2)
(Saudi Arabia) Al-Ahli (p)	3 (4)

Quarter-finals
(Australia) Adelaide United	2	2	4
(Uzbekistan) Bunyodkor (a.e.t.)	2	3	5
(South Korea) Ulsan Hyundai	1	4	5
(Saudi Arabia) Al-Hilal	0	0	0
(Saudi Arabia) Al-Ittihad	4	1	5
(China) Guangzhou Evergrande	2	2	4
(Iran) Sepahan	0	1	1
(Saudi Arabia) Al-Ahli	0	4	4

Semi-finals
(Uzbekistan) Bunyodkor	1	0	1
(South Korea) Ulsan Hyundai	3	2	5
(Saudi Arabia) Al-Ittihad	1	0	1
(Saudi Arabia) Al-Ahli	0	2	2

Final
(South Korea) Ulsan Hyundai	3
(Saudi Arabia) Al-Ahli	0

== Round of 16 ==
The matches were played 22 and 23 May (West Zone) and 29 and 30 May 2012 (East Zone).

West Zone
Team 1	Score	Team 2
Al-Jazira (United Arab Emirates)	3–3 (aet) (2–4 p)	(Saudi Arabia) Al-Ahli
Sepahan (Iran)	2–0	(Iran) Esteghlal
Al-Ittihad (Saudi Arabia)	3–0	(Iran) Persepolis
Al-Hilal (Saudi Arabia)	7–1	(United Arab Emirates) Baniyas

East Zone
Team 1	Score	Team 2
Adelaide United (Australia)	1–0	(Japan) Nagoya Grampus
Seongnam Ilhwa Chunma (South Korea)	0–1	(Uzbekistan) Bunyodkor
Ulsan Hyundai (South Korea)	3–2	(Japan) Kashiwa Reysol
Guangzhou Evergrande (China)	1–0	(Japan) FC Tokyo

=== Matches ===
22 May 2012
19:45 UTC+04:00

Al-Jazira (United Arab Emirates)	3–3 (a.e.t.)	(Saudi Arabia) Al-Ahli
Oliveira 33', 114'; Delgado 62'	Report	Camacho 22'; Al Hosni 75'; Simões 118'
Penalties
Oliveira (penalty missed); Al Menhali (penalty scored); Esmaeell (penalty scored); Neill (penalty missed)	2–4	(penalty scored) Camacho; (penalty scored) Al-Mayouf; (penalty scored) Al-Fahmi; (penalty missed) Palomino; (penalty scored) Simões

Mohammed Bin Zayed Stadium, Abu Dhabi
Attendance: 13,355
Referee: Ryuji Sato (Japan)

22 May 2012
20:30 UTC+04:30

Sepahan (Iran)	2–0	(Iran) Esteghlal
Correa 8'; Bengar 34'	Report

Foolad Shahr Stadium, Isfahan
Attendance: 12,351
Referee: Kim Dong-Jin (Korea Republic)

23 May 2012
21:10 UTC+03:00

Al-Ittihad (Saudi Arabia)	3–0	(Iran) Persepolis
Hazazi 36' (pen.); Abdelghani 45+1'; Otaif 87'	Report

Prince Abdullah al-Faisal Stadium, Jeddah
Attendance: 15,300
Referee: Valentin Kovalenko (Uzbekistan)

23 May 2012
21:10 UTC+03:00

Al-Hilal (Saudi Arabia)	7–1	(United Arab Emirates) Baniyas
Yoo Byung-Soo 23', 38', 53', 61'; Wilhelmsson 26', 59'; Al-Dawsari 86'	Report	Yeste 57' (pen.)

Prince Faisal bin Fahd Stadium, Riyadh
Attendance: 22,518
Referee: Nawaf Shukralla (Bahrain)

29 May 2012
19:30 UTC+09:30

Adelaide United (Australia)	1–0	(Japan) Nagoya Grampus
McKain 42'	Report

Hindmarsh Stadium, Adelaide
Attendance: 9,758
Referee: Malik Abdul Bashir (Singapore)

29 May 2012
19:30 UTC+09:00

Seongnam Ilhwa Chunma (South Korea)	0–1	(Uzbekistan) Bunyodkor
	Report	Karimov 53' (pen.)

Tancheon Sports Complex, Seongnam
Attendance: 3,808
Referee: Mohsen Torky (Iran)

30 May 2012
19:30 UTC+09:00

Ulsan Hyundai (South Korea)	3–2	(Japan) Kashiwa Reysol
Kim Shin-Wook 54'; Kondo 71' (o.g.); Lee Keun-Ho 88'	Report	Leandro Domingues 66'; Tanaka 90+2'

Ulsan Munsu Football Stadium, Ulsan
Attendance: 14,341
Referee: Mohamed Al Zarooni (UAE)

30 May 2012
20:00 UTC+08:00

Guangzhou Evergrande (China)	1–0	(Japan) FC Tokyo
Cléo 31'	Report

Tianhe Stadium, Guangzhou
Attendance: 39,560
Referee: Abdullah Balideh (Qatar)

== Quarter-finals ==
The first legs were played 19 September 2012, and the second legs were played 2 and 3 October 2012.

Team 1	Agg.	Team 2	1st leg	2nd leg
Al-Ittihad (Saudi Arabia)	5–4	(China) Guangzhou Evergrande	4–2	1–2
Sepahan (Iran)	1–4	(Saudi Arabia) Al-Ahli	0–0	1–4
Adelaide United (Australia)	4–5	(Uzbekistan) Bunyodkor	2–2	2–3 (a.e.t.)
Ulsan Hyundai (South Korea)	5–0	(Saudi Arabia) Al-Hilal	1–0	4–0

=== First legs ===
19 September 2012
19:30 UTC+09:30

Adelaide United (Australia)	2–2	(Uzbekistan) Bunyodkor
Ramsay 7'; Kostopoulos 16'	Report	Hasanov 44'; Salomov 75'

Hindmarsh Stadium, Adelaide
Attendance: 10,366
Referee: Abdullah Al Hilali (Oman)

19 September 2012
19:30 UTC+09:00

Ulsan Hyundai (South Korea)	1–0	(Saudi Arabia) Al-Hilal
Rafinha 10'	Report

Ulsan Munsu Football Stadium, Ulsan
Attendance: 5,955
Referee: Ryuji Sato (Japan)

19 September 2012
20:30 UTC+04:30

Sepahan (Iran)	0–0	(Saudi Arabia) Al-Ahli
	Report

Foolad Shahr Stadium, Isfahan
Attendance: 9,280
Referee: Liu Kwok Man (Hong Kong)

19 September 2012
20:35 UTC+03:00

Al-Ittihad (Saudi Arabia)	4–2	(China) Guangzhou Evergrande
Diego Souza 28'; Noor 49' (pen.); Hazazi 61', 88'	Report	Gao Lin 27'; Huang Bowen 39'

Prince Abdullah al-Faisal Stadium, Jeddah
Attendance: 15,971
Referee: Andre El Haddad (Lebanon)

=== Second legs ===
2 October 2012
20:00 UTC+08:00

Guangzhou Evergrande (China)	2–1	(Saudi Arabia) Al-Ittihad
Barrios 19'; Conca 35' (pen.)	Report	F. Al-Muwallad 79'

Tianhe Stadium, Guangzhou
Attendance: 39,997
Referee: Kim Dong-Jin (Korea Republic)

Al-Ittihad won 5–4 on aggregate.

2 October 2012
20:15 UTC+03:00

Al-Ahli (Saudi Arabia)	4–1	(Iran) Sepahan
Simões 30' (pen.); Al Hosni 35', 45+1'; Jaizawi 70'	Report	Talebi 37'

Prince Abdullah al-Faisal Stadium, Jeddah
Attendance: 16,838
Referee: Peter Green (Australia)

Al-Ahli won 4–1 on aggregate.

3 October 2012
19:00 UTC+05:00

Bunyodkor (Uzbekistan)	3–2 (a.e.t.)	(Australia) Adelaide United
Turaev 20'; Shorakhmedov 72'; Rakhmatullaev 114'	Report	Ramsay 4'; Neumann 63'

JAR Stadium, Tashkent
Attendance: 7,212
Referee: Ali Abdulnabi (Bahrain)

Bunyodkor won 5–4 on aggregate.

3 October 2012
20:10 UTC+03:00

Al-Hilal (Saudi Arabia)	0–4	(South Korea) Ulsan Hyundai
	Report	Rafinha 24', 27'; Kim Shin-Wook 54'; Lee Keun-Ho 65'

Prince Faisal bin Fahd Stadium, Riyadh
Attendance: 19,573
Referee: Mohsen Torky (Iran)

Ulsan Hyundai won 5–0 on aggregate.

== Semi-finals ==
The first legs were played 22 and 24 October 2012, and the second legs were played 31 October 2012.

Team 1	Agg.	Team 2	1st leg	2nd leg
Al-Ittihad (Saudi Arabia)	1–2	(Saudi Arabia) Al-Ahli	1–0	0–2
Bunyodkor (Uzbekistan)	1–5	(South Korea) Ulsan Hyundai	1–3	0–2

=== First legs ===
22 October 2012
20:00 UTC+03:00

Al-Ittihad (Saudi Arabia)	1–0	(Saudi Arabia) Al-Ahli
Hazazi 67'	Report

Prince Abdullah al-Faisal Stadium, Jeddah
Attendance: 17,050
Referee: Abdullah Balideh (Qatar)

24 October 2012
18:00 UTC+05:00

Bunyodkor (Uzbekistan)	1–3	(South Korea) Ulsan Hyundai
Ibrokhimov 5'	Report	Rafinha 31'; Kim Shin-Wook 53'; Lee Keun-Ho 72'

JAR Stadium, Tashkent
Attendance: 7,500
Referee: Ali Al Badwawi (UAE)

=== Second legs ===
31 October 2012
19:30 UTC+09:00

Ulsan Hyundai (South Korea)	2–0	(Uzbekistan) Bunyodkor
Kim Shin-Wook 53'; Lee Keun-Ho 75'	Report

Ulsan Munsu Football Stadium, Ulsan
Attendance: 7,864
Referee: Abdulrahman Abdou (Qatar)

Ulsan Hyundai won 5–1 on aggregate.

31 October 2012
20:00 UTC+03:00

Al-Ahli (Saudi Arabia)	2–0	(Saudi Arabia) Al-Ittihad
Al-Musa 44'; Simões 84'	Report

Prince Abdullah al-Faisal Stadium, Jeddah
Attendance: 17,200
Referee: Yuichi Nishimura (Japan)

Al-Ahli won 2–1 on aggregate.

== Final ==
The final of the 2012 AFC Champions League was hosted by one of the finalists, decided by a draw. According to the draw on 14 June 2012, the winner of semi-final 2 would host the final. Therefore, Ulsan Hyundai was the home team.

10 November 2012
19:30 UTC+09:00

Ulsan Hyundai (South Korea)	3–0	(Saudi Arabia) Al-Ahli
Kwak Tae-Hwi 13'; Rafinha 68'; Kim Seung-Yong 75'	Report

Ulsan Munsu Football Stadium, Ulsan
Attendance: 42,153
Referee: Ben Williams (Australia)
