= Haider Al-Amer =

Saudi Arabian footballer

Personal information
- Full name: Haider Mahdi Al-Amer
- Date of birth: December 2, 1989 (age 36)
- Place of birth: Saudi Arabia
- Height: 1.68 m (5 ft 6 in)
- Position: Full back

Youth career
- Hajer

Senior career*
Years	Team	Apps	(Gls)
2007–2012	Hajer		
2012–2014	Al-Ahli		
2015–2018	Al-Adalah		
2018–2019	Al-Omran		
- * Club domestic league appearances and goals

Haider Al-Amer (Arabic: حيدر العامر; born December 2, 1989) is a Saudi football player who plays as a full back.
