= Kim Hyo-gi =

South Korean footballer (born 1986)

Kim Hyo-Gi
Personal information
- Full name: Kim Hyo-Gi
- Date of birth: 3 July 1986 (age 40)
- Place of birth: Chungju, Chungcheongbuk-do, South Korea
- Height: 1.79 m (5 ft 10 1/2 in)
- Position: Forward

Team information
- Current team: Hwaseong FC
- Number: 18

Youth career
- Chosun University

Senior career*
| Years | Team | Apps | (Gls) |
| 2010– | Ulsan Hyundai | 5 | (0) |
| 2011 | → Ulsan Hyundai Mipo (loan) | 12 | (6) |
| 2012 | → Ulsan Hyundai Mipo (loan) | 10 | (4) |
| 2013–2014 | → Hwaseong FC (loan) | | |
| 2015 | → FC Anyang (loan) | 15 | (8) |
| 2016 | Jeonbuk Hyundai | 0 | (0) |
| 2016–2017 | FC Anyang | 46 | (9) |
| 2018–2019 | Gyeongnam FC | 59 | (11) |
| 2020–2021 | Gwangju FC | 12 | (0) |
| 2021- | Hwaseong FC | 33 | (6) |
- * Club domestic league appearances and goals as of 23 October 2022

Kim Hyo-Gi (Korean: 김효기; born 3 July 1986) is a South Korean footballer who plays as a forward for Hwaseong FC in the K3 League.
