= Choi Jin-soo (footballer) =

South Korean footballer

Choi Jin-Soo
Personal information
- Date of birth: 17 June 1990 (age 36)
- Place of birth: South Korea
- Height: 1.78 m (5 ft 10 in)
- Position: Midfielder

Team information
- Current team: Ulsan Citizen FC
- Number: 10

Senior career*
Years	Team	Apps	(Gls)
2010–2013	Ulsan Hyundai	7	(0)
2013	→ FC Anyang (loan)	31	(6)
2014–2017	FC Anyang	65	(6)
2016–2017	→ Asan Mugunghwa (army)	15	(3)
2018	Gangneung City FC	19	(0)
2019-2021	Cheonan City FC	32	(4)
2022–	Ulsan Citizen FC	18	(0)
- * Club domestic league appearances and goals as of 24 October 2022

- Choi Jin-soo
- Hangul: 최진수
- Hanja: 催進樹
- RR: Choe Jinsu
- MR: Ch'oe Chinsu

Choi Jin-Soo (Korean: 최진수; born 17 June 1990) is a South Korean footballer who plays as midfielder for Ulsan Citizen FC in K3 League.

== Career ==
Choi Jin-Soo was selected by Ulsan Hyundai in 2010 K-League Draft. Choi made his K-League debut against Pohang Steelers, coming on as a substitute in the 1–1 draw on 5 May 2010.
