= Kim Seung-gyu =

South Korean footballer (born 1990)

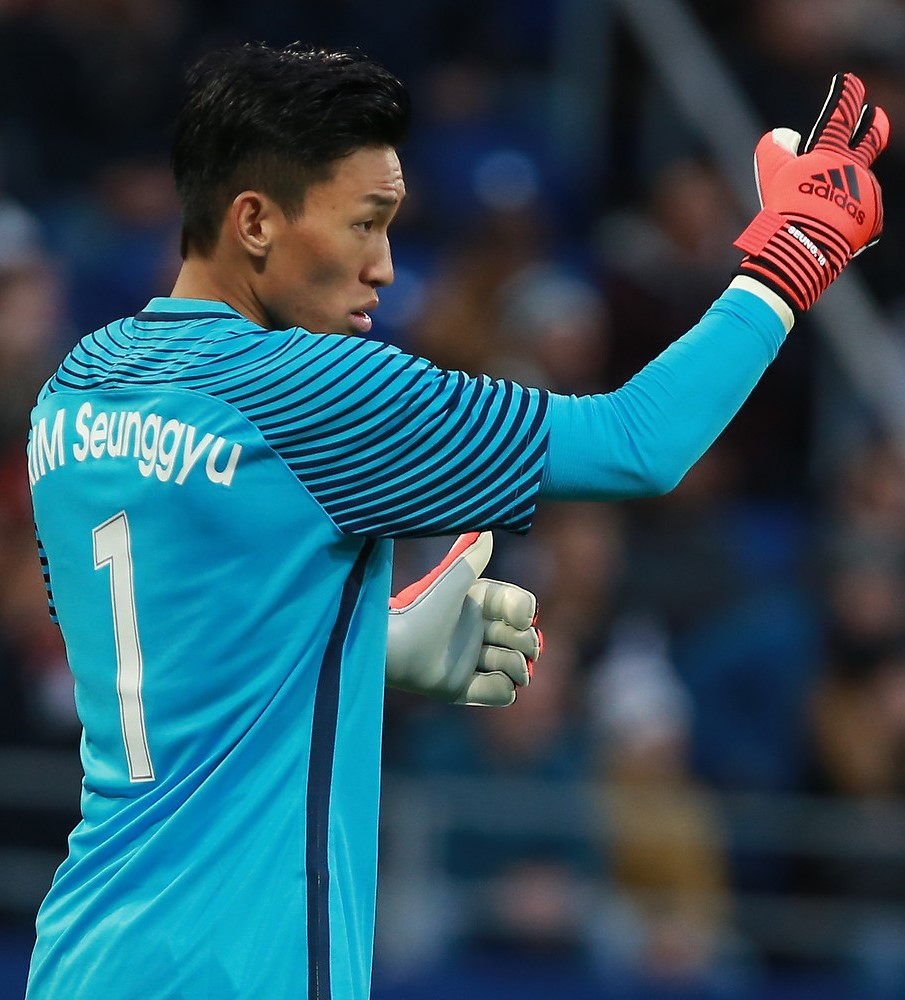
- Kim with South Korea in 2017

Personal information
- Full name: Kim Seung-gyu
- Date of birth: 30 September 1990 (age 36)
- Place of birth: Ulsan, South Korea
- Height: 1.89 m (6 ft 2 in)
- Position: Goalkeeper

Team information
- Current team: FC Tokyo
- Number: 81

Youth career
- 2003–2012: Ulsan Hyundai (Note: Played for Hyundai Middle School from 2003 to 2005, Hyundai High School from 2006 to 2007, and Ulsan Hyundai B from 2006 to 2012, which were academies of Ulsan Hyundai.)

Senior career*
Years	Team	Apps	(Gls)
2008–2015	Ulsan Hyundai	110	(0)
2016–2019	Vissel Kobe	107	(0)
2019	Ulsan Hyundai	16	(0)
2020–2022	Kashiwa Reysol	72	(0)
2022–2025	Al-Shabab	57	(0)
2025–	FC Tokyo	28	(0)

International career^{‡}
2006–2007	South Korea U17	17 (Note: Includes one appearance against non-national team.)	(0)
2008–2009	South Korea U20	16	(0)
2009–2014	South Korea U23	15 (Note: Includes six appearances as an overage player in Asian Games.)	(0)
2013–	South Korea	93	(0)
Medal record
Men's football
Representing South Korea
AFC Asian Cup
Runner-up	2015 Australia
Asian Games
Gold medal – first place	2014 Incheon
Bronze medal – third place	2010 Guangzhou
EAFF Championship
Winner	2015 China
Winner	2019 South Korea
AFF U-19 Youth Championship
Runner-up	2008 Thailand
- * Club domestic league appearances and goals as of 7 November 2026 ‡ National team caps and goals as of 13 November 2026

- Kim Seung-gyu
- Hangul: 김승규
- Hanja: 金承奎
- RR: Gim Seunggyu
- MR: Kim Sŭnggyu
- IPA: [kim.sɯŋ.ɡju]

Kim Seung-gyu (Korean: 김승규; born 30 September 1990) is a South Korean professional footballer who plays as a goalkeeper for J1 League club FC Tokyo and the South Korea national team.

== Club career ==
=== Ulsan Hyundai ===
Kim was a much-anticipated youth player of K League club Ulsan Hyundai, and joined the senior team after graduating middle school. However, he usually played for the reserve team and high school's team for a long time. He started to get opportunities after existing goalkeeper Kim Young-kwang was injured in 2013. That year, he was selected for the K League Best XI as well as proving his worth at the senior team.

=== Vissel Kobe ===
After playing as Ulsan's main goalkeeper until 2015, Kim moved to J1 League club Vissel Kobe. In his first season at Kobe, he was selected as one of the league's three best goalkeepers, who were nominated for the Best XI award. But the award was given to Urawa Red Diamonds goalkeeper Shūsaku Nishikawa. He played as first-choice goalkeeper for Kobe until 2018, but lost his place in the 2019 season when the club exceeded the limit on the number of foreign players. He decided to return to Ulsan in the summer.

=== Return to Ulsan ===
Kim came back to Ulsan Hyundai in the middle of the 2019 season, lending support to the club in the K League 1 title race. Prior to the last league match against Pohang Steelers, they were three points clear of second-placed Jeonbuk Hyundai Motors, with one match left. However, they lost the match 4–1 at their home stadium, and lost the league title on the number of goals to Jeonbuk, who earned the same points. Kim was criticised for making a fatal mistake in the match. He urgently took a throw-in when his team were trailing 2–1 with three minutes left in the match, but opposing forward Heo Yong-joon intercepted the ball and put it into the empty goal.

=== Kashiwa Reysol ===
Prior to the 2020 season, Kim joined J1 League club Kashiwa Reysol. He was pushed to the bench early in the season due to the existence of Japan international Kosuke Nakamura, and then received opportunities after Nakamura was injured. On 7 October, he led Kashiwa to a 1–0 win by showing numerous saves in the J.League Cup semi-finals against Yokohama F. Marinos, being in the spotlight of the Japanese press. He also participated in the league cup final against FC Tokyo, which ended in a 2–1 defeat.

=== Al-Shabab ===
On 6 July 2022, Kim transferred to Saudi Pro League club Al-Shabab. He kept the third highest number of clean sheets with 11 at the 2022–23 Saudi Pro League. He kept clean sheets in all four matches until the quarter-finals of the 2023 Arab Club Champions Cup, but conceded three goals in the 3–1 semi-final defeat to Al-Hilal.

Kim suffered a cruciate ligament injury while training at the South Korea national team in January 2024, and had a relapse two months later after recovering from it in August. In 2025, Al-Shabab did not pay their players salaries, causing controversy.

=== FC Tokyo ===
On 7 June 2025, J1 League club FC Tokyo announced they recruited Kim. They had been ranked 18th out of 20 teams in the league standings at the time, but finished 11th after his contribution.

== International career ==
=== Early career ===
After representing South Korea at between under-17 and under-20 level, Kim played as the main goalkeeper for the national under-23 team at the 2010 Asian Games, where he won a bronze medal. In the semi-finals against United Arab Emirates, manager Hong Myung-bo replaced Kim with another goalkeeper Lee Bum-young to prepare for a penalty shoot-out when the score was tied at 0–0 prior to stoppage time after 120 minutes, but this decision was followed by opponents' winning goal at the last moment.

On 14 August 2013, Kim made his senior international debut in a 0–0 friendly draw with Peru.

=== 2014 World Cup ===
Kim was named in the South Korea squad for the 2014 FIFA World Cup as second-choice goalkeeper behind Jung Sung-ryong. He did not play the first two matches, but was in the starting line-up against Belgium after Jung's poor performance in a 4–2 defeat to Algeria. Despite conceding one goal during a 1–0 defeat to Belgium, he was praised for his numerous saves by South Korean media and fans.

=== 2014 Asian Games ===
Kim participated at the 2014 Asian Games as an overage player of the South Korea under-23 team. He conceded no goals in six matches he played, helping South Korea win the competition for the first time in 28 years. He was exempted from mandatory military service after receiving a gold medal at the competition.

Kim was selected for the senior national team for the 2015 AFC Asian Cup, and appeared in their second group stage match against Kuwait in place of main goalkeeper Kim Jin-hyeon. He contributed to a 1–0 win by keeping a clean sheet, but was criticised for his inaccurate passes and lack of harmony with defenders. He was also called up to the national team for the 2018 FIFA World Cup, but Jo Hyeon-woo played all matches this time.

=== 2022 World Cup ===
After the 2018 World Cup, Kim received a strong trust from new manager Paulo Bento, playing as first-choice goalkeeper for South Korea under him. Kim conceded two goals during five matches at the 2019 AFC Asian Cup and three goals during 14 matches in the 2022 FIFA World Cup qualifiers.

In 2022, Kim participated at the World Cup as the main goalkeeper for the first time. While South Korea finished second in the Group H, he conceded only one goal during two matches against Uruguay and Portugal, which ended in a goalless draw and a 2–1 win respectively, although he failed to block any of opponents' three shots on target in a 3–2 defeat to Ghana. He made five saves in the round of 16 against Brazil, where his team lost 4–1.

During the 2023 AFC Asian Cup, Kim played for his country in a 3–1 win over Bahrain, which was their opener, but he was absent from the other matches due to a cruciate ligament injury.

=== 2026 World Cup ===
While playing three Group A matches for South Korea at the 2026 FIFA World Cup, Kim made nine saves and conceded three goals. In the middle of the second group stage match against hosts Mexico, he tried catching the aerial ball behind his teammate, but missed the ball after running into the teammate, and opposing player Luis Romo put it into the net. Despite blocking Mexico's three shots on target, he caused a 1–0 defeat with that mistake.

== Style of play ==
Known as one of the most versatile goalkeepers in South Korea, Kim was originally noted for his quick reflexes and movement, and improved his passing skills while playing at the J1 League.

== Personal life ==
On 17 June 2024, Kim married model Kim Jin-kyung. On 4 June 2026, the couple welcomed their first child, a daughter.

== Career statistics ==
=== Club ===
As of match played 7 November 2026

Appearances and goals by club, season and competition
Club	Season	League			National cup (Note: Includes Korean FA Cup, Emperor's Cup, King Cup)		League cup (Note: Includes Korean League Cup, J.League Cup)		Continental		Other		Total	
Club	Season	Division	Apps	Goals	Apps	Goals	Apps	Goals	Apps	Goals	Apps	Goals	Apps	Goals
Ulsan Hyundai	2008	K League	0	0	0	0	0	0	—		2 (Note: Appearances in K League Championship)	0	2	0
Ulsan Hyundai	2009	K League	0	0	0	0	0	0	1 (Note: Appearances in AFC Champions League)	0	—		1	0
Ulsan Hyundai	2010	K League	3	0	1	0	4	0	—		—		8	0
Ulsan Hyundai	2011	K League	0	0	0	0	0	0	—		2	0	2	0
Ulsan Hyundai	2012	K League	12	0	0	0	—		5	0	—		17	0
Ulsan Hyundai	2013	K League 1	32	0	2	0	—		—		—		34	0
Ulsan Hyundai	2014	K League 1	29	0	1	0	—		6	0	—		36	0
Ulsan Hyundai	2015	K League 1	34	0	4	0	—		—		—		38	0
Ulsan Hyundai	Total		110	0	8	0	4	0	12	0	4	0	138	0
Vissel Kobe	2016	J1 League	34	0	1	0	2	0	—		—		37	0
Vissel Kobe	2017	J1 League	31	0	3	0	5	0	—		—		39	0
Vissel Kobe	2018	J1 League	30	0	2	0	0	0	—		—		32	0
Vissel Kobe	2019	J1 League	12	0	0	0	1	0	—		—		13	0
Vissel Kobe	Total		107	0	6	0	8	0	—		—		121	0
Ulsan Hyundai	2019	K League 1	16	0	—		—		—		—		16	0
Kashiwa Reysol	2020	J1 League	24	0	—		3	0	—		—		27	0
Kashiwa Reysol	2021	J1 League	35	0	1	0	1	0	—		—		37	0
Kashiwa Reysol	2022	J1 League	13	0	0	0	0	0	—		—		13	0
Kashiwa Reysol	Total		72	0	1	0	4	0	0	0	—		77	0
Al-Shabab	2022–23	Saudi Pro League	30	0	1	0	—		2	0	4 (Note: Appearances in Arab Club Champions Cup)	0	37	0
Al-Shabab	2023–24	Saudi Pro League	19	0	3	0	—		—		5	0	27	0
Al-Shabab	2024–25	Saudi Pro League	8	0	1	0	—		—		—		9	0
Al-Shabab	Total		57	0	5	0	—		2	0	9	0	73	0
FC Tokyo	2025	J1 League	14	0	3	0	0	0	—		—		17	0
FC Tokyo	2026–27	J1 League	14	0	0	0	0	0	—		16 (Note: Appearances in J1 100 Year Vision League)	0	30	0
FC Tokyo	Total		28	0	3	0	0	0	—		16	0	47	0
Career total			390	0	23	0	16	0	14	0	29	0	472	0

=== International ===
As of match played 13 November 2026

Appearances and goals by national team and year
National team	Year	Apps	Goals
South Korea	2013	3	0
South Korea	2014	4	0
South Korea	2015	10	0
South Korea	2016	5	0
South Korea	2017	5	0
South Korea	2018	10	0
South Korea	2019	11	0
South Korea	2021	9	0
South Korea	2022	14	0
South Korea	2023	8	0
South Korea	2024	2	0
South Korea	2025	3	0
South Korea	2026	9	0
Total		93	0

== Honours ==
Ulsan Hyundai

- AFC Champions League: 2012

Kashiwa Reysol

- J.League Cup runner-up: 2020

South Korea U23

- Asian Games: 2014

South Korea

- AFC Asian Cup runner-up: 2015
- EAFF Championship: 2015, 2019

Individual

- K League 1 Best XI: 2013
- K League All-Star: 2014
- EAFF Championship Best Goalkeeper: 2019
