= Kim Yong-tae (footballer) =

South Korean footballer (born 1984)

Personal information
- Full name: Kim Yong-tae
- Date of birth: May 20, 1984 (age 42)
- Place of birth: South Korea
- Height: 1.76 m (5 ft 9 in)
- Position: Midfielder

Youth career
- University of Ulsan

Senior career*
Years	Team	Apps	(Gls)
2006–2008	Daejeon Citizen	49	(1)
2009–2014	Ulsan Hyundai	71	(4)
2011–2012	→ Sangju Sangmu	38	(2)
2014–2015	Busan IPark	36	(1)
2016–2017	Chungju Hummel	25	(0)
2017	Pusamania Borneo	0	(0)
- * Club domestic league appearances and goals

Kim Yong-tae (born May 20, 1984) is a South Korean football player who recently plays for Indonesian club Pusamania Borneo in the Liga 1.
