= Lee Seung-yeoul =

South Korean footballer (born 1989)

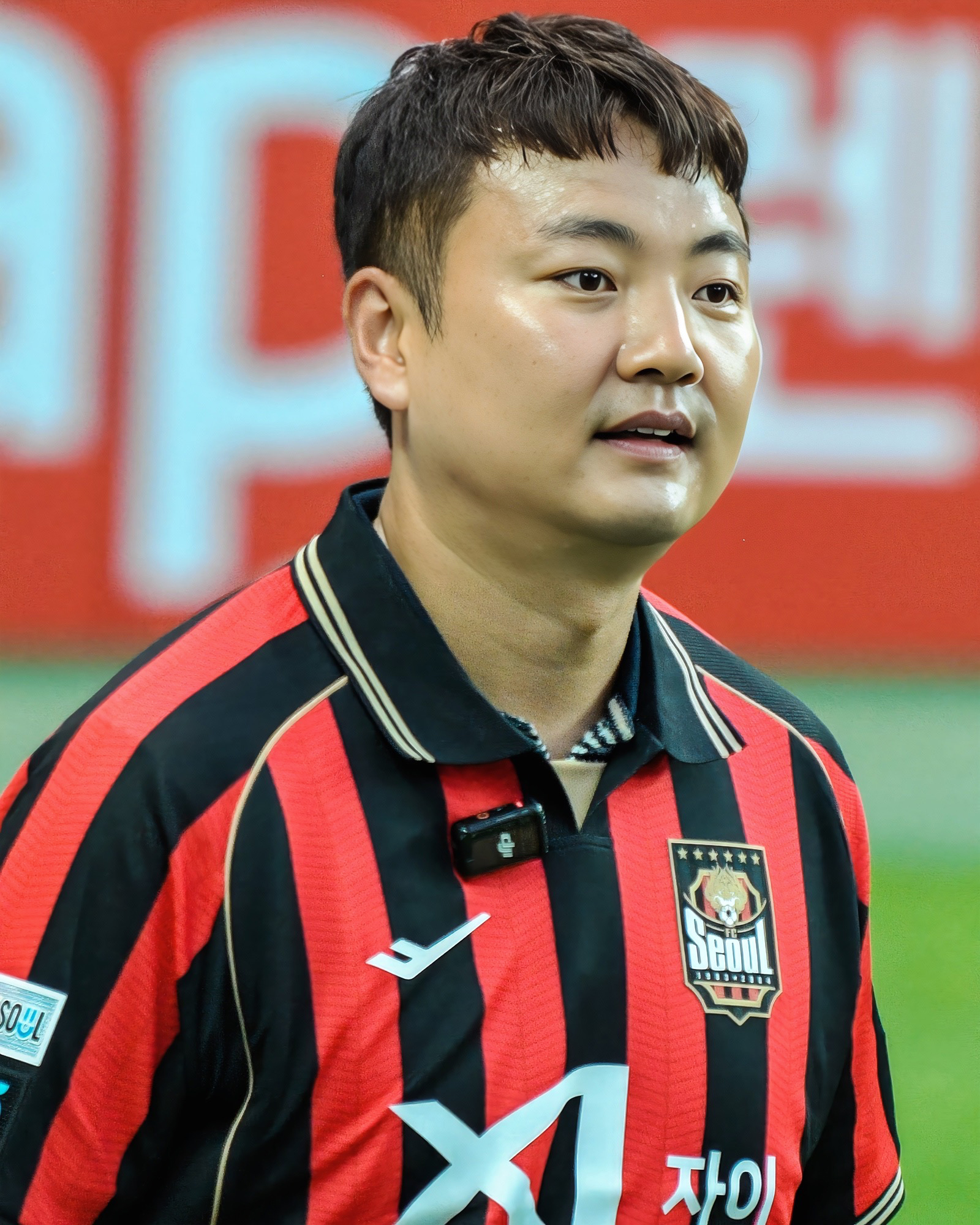
- Lee in 2026

Personal information
- Full name: Lee Seung-yeoul
- Date of birth: 6 March 1989 (age 37)
- Place of birth: Bucheon, Gyeonggi, South Korea
- Height: 1.82 m (6 ft 0 in)
- Position: Forward

Youth career
- 2005–2007: Shingal High School

Senior career*
Years	Team	Apps	(Gls)
2008–2011	FC Seoul	82	(16)
2012	Gamba Osaka	8	(0)
2012	→ Ulsan Hyundai (loan)	14	(2)
2013	Seongnam Ilhwa Chunma	23	(3)
2014–2015	Jeonbuk Hyundai Motors	12	(0)
2016	Suwon FC	4	(0)
Total		143	(21)

International career
2009	South Korea U20	6	(1)
2009–2011	South Korea U23	3	(0)
2010	South Korea	10	(3)
Medal record
Men's football
Representing South Korea
EAFF Championship
Runner-up	2010 Japan
- * Club domestic league appearances and goals

- Lee Seung-yeoul
- Hangul: 이승렬
- Hanja: 李昇烈
- RR: I Seungryeol
- MR: I Sŭngnyŏl

Lee Seung-yeoul (Korean: 이승렬; Hanja: 李昇烈; born 6 March 1989), also romanised as Lee Seung-ryul, is a former South Korean footballer who played as a striker or winger.

== Club career ==
A graduate of Shingal High School, Lee entered the 2008 K League draft and joined FC Seoul. He scored five goals including three winning goals while playing 31 matches as a striker in his first professional season. He was named the K League Rookie of the Year at the end of the season.

On 7 March 2009, Lee scored a goal in Seoul's season opener against Jeonnam Dragons, which ended in a 6–1 win. He made 21 appearances and 5 goals at the 2009 K League, while concentrating on the 2009 FIFA U-20 World Cup.

In 2010, Lee simultaneously played for Seoul and the national team. During the 2010 season, he had 10 goals and six assists in 28 matches, and won a K League title. He was evaluated as one of the best South Korean talents at the time, and played a match against Greece at the 2010 FIFA World Cup under Huh Jung-moo, the national team manager.

Contrary to expectation, Lee's capability was in decline since 2011. He scored only one goal in 2011, and transferred to several K League clubs as well as J1 League club Gamba Osaka to find a turning point in his career. He finished his professional career without a reversal after leaving Suwon FC in 2016. After retiring, he criticised his agent for sending him to clubs, who did not consider him as a main player. According to him, he complained to the agent about dogmatic negotiations and his lack of playing time, but a 20-year unfair contract with the agent caught up with him.

== International career ==
On 9 January 2010, Lee made his first international cap for South Korea in a 4–2 friendly defeat to Zambia.

Lee scored his first and second international goal against Hong Kong and Japan, respectively, at the 2010 East Asian Football Championship. He became the tournament's joint-top scorer with two goals.

Lee played as a 87th-minute substitute in South Korea's opener against Greece at the 2010 FIFA World Cup. Afterwards, he was benched for the next three matches. Despite playing only five minutes, he expressed a deep impression he felt at that moment in an interview after the competition.

== Career statistics ==
=== Club ===
Appearances and goals by club, season and competition
Club	Season	League			National cup		League cup		Asia		Other		Total	
Club	Season	Division	Apps	Goals	Apps	Goals	Apps	Goals	Apps	Goals	Apps	Goals	Apps	Goals
FC Seoul	2008	K League	21	3	1	0	10	2	—		—		32	5
FC Seoul	2009	K League	21	5	2	0	4	2	7	1	1 (Note: Appearances in K League Championship)	0	35	8
FC Seoul	2010	K League	23	7	1	0	3	3	—		2	0	29	10
FC Seoul	2011	K League	17	1	1	0	1	0	4	0	1	0	24	1
FC Seoul	Total		82	16	5	0	18	7	11	1	4	0	120	24
Gamba Osaka	2012	J1 League	8	0	0	0	0	0	—		—		8	0
Ulsan Hyundai (loan)	2012	K League	14	2	1	0	—		5	0	—		20	2
Seongnam Ilhwa Chunma	2013	K League 1	23	3	2	1	—		—		—		25	4
Jeonbuk Hyundai Motors	2014	K League 1	9	0	?	?	—		2	0	—		11	0
Jeonbuk Hyundai Motors	2015	K League 1	3	0	?	?	—		0	0	—		3	0
Jeonbuk Hyundai Motors	Total		12	0	?	?	—		2	0	—		14	0
Suwon FC	2016	K League 1	4	0	?	?	—		—		—		4	0
Career total			143	21	8	1	18	7	18	1	4	0	191	30

=== International ===
List of international goals scored by Lee Seung-yeoul
No.	Date	Venue	Opponent	Score	Result	Competition
1	7 February 2010	Tokyo, Japan	Hong Kong	4–0	5–0	2010 EAFF Championship
2	14 February 2010	Tokyo, Japan	Japan	2–1	3–1	2010 EAFF Championship
3	16 May 2010	Seoul, South Korea	Ecuador	1–0	2–0	Friendly

== Honours ==
FC Seoul

- K League 1: 2010
- Korean League Cup: 2010

Ulsan Hyundai

- AFC Champions League: 2012

Jeonbuk Hyundai Motors

- K League 1: 2014, 2015

South Korea

- EAFF Championship runner-up: 2010

Individual

- K League Rookie of the Year: 2008
- EAFF Championship top goalscorer: 2010
- K League All-Star: 2010
