= Kang Jin-wook =

South Korean footballer

Personal information
- Full name: Kang Jin-wook
- Date of birth: 13 February 1986 (age 40)
- Place of birth: South Korea
- Height: 1.83 m (6 ft 0 in)
- Position: Defender

Team information
- Current team: UiTM FC

Youth career
- 2002–2003: Joongdong High School
- 2002–2003: → FC Metz (KFA Youth Project)
- 2003–2004: FC Metz

Senior career*
Years	Team	Apps	(Gls)
2004–2005	Metz B	?	(?)
2005–2006	Metz	4	(0)
2006	→ Jeju United (loan)	3	(0)
2007–2008	Gwangju Sangmu (army)	14	(0)
2009–2012	Ulsan Hyundai	53	(1)
2013–2015	Seongnam FC	6	(0)
2016–	UiTM FC		

International career^{‡}
2003	South Korea U-17	6	(0)
2004–2005	South Korea U-20	9	(0)
- * Club domestic league appearances and goals as of 5 December 2015 ‡ National team caps and goals as of 2 September 2008

- Kang Jin-wook
- Hangul: 강진욱
- Hanja: 姜珍旭
- RR: Gang Jinuk
- MR: Kang Chinuk

Kang Jin-wook (Korean: 강진욱; born 13 February 1986) is a South Korean footballer who currently plays for UiTM FC in Liga Perdana.

His previous club was Gwangju Sangmu at K-League in South Korea, and his youth club is FC Metz in France.

== Club career statistics ==
As of end of 2015 season

Club performance			League		Cup		League Cup		Continental		Total	
Season	Club	League	Apps	Goals	Apps	Goals	Apps	Goals	Apps	Goals	Apps	Goals
France			League		Coupe de France		Coupe de la Ligue		Europe		Total	
2005–06	FC Metz	Ligue 1	4	0	0	0	0	0	-		4	0
South Korea			League		KFA Cup		League Cup		Asia		Total	
2006	Jeju United	K-League	3	0	0	0	0	0	-		3	0
2007	Gwangju Sangmu	K-League	0	0	0	0	0	0	-		0	0
2008	Gwangju Sangmu	K-League	10	0	2	0	4	0	-		16	0
2009	Ulsan Hyundai	K-League	10	0	0	0	1	0			11	0
2010	Ulsan Hyundai	K-League	12	0	0	0	4	0	-		16	0
2011	Ulsan Hyundai	K-League	14	0	-	-	3	0	-		17	1
2012	Ulsan Hyundai	K-League	19	0	2	0	-	-	2	0	21	0
2013	Seongnam	K-League	6	0	-	-	-	-	-		6	0
2015	Seongnam	K-League	0	0	?	?	0	0	-		0	0
Total	France		4	0	0	0	0	0	-		4	0
Total	South Korea		86	1	2	0	9	0			97	1
Career total			90	1	2	0	9	0	-		111	1
