= Lee Jae-sung (footballer, born 1988) =

South Korean footballer

Personal information
- Full name: Lee Jae-sung
- Date of birth: 5 July 1988 (age 38)
- Place of birth: South Korea
- Height: 1.87 m (6 ft 1 1/2 in)
- Position: Central defender

Youth career
- Korea University

Senior career*
Years	Team	Apps	(Gls)
2009–2010	Suwon Samsung Bluewings	11	(1)
2010	→ Ulsan Hyundai (loan)	13	(0)
2011–2016	Ulsan Hyundai	99	(7)
2013–2014	→ Sangju Sangmu (army)	36	(2)
2017–2018	Jeonbuk Hyundai	26	(3)
2019–2020	Incheon United	29	(1)
2020–2021	Ratchaburi Mitr Phol	9	(0)
2022–2024	Chungnam Asan FC	20	(0)
2024	Muangthong United	9	(1)
Total		252	(15)

International career^{‡}
2011	South Korea	1	(0)
- * Club domestic league appearances and goals as of 04:05, 7 July 2026 (UTC) ‡ National team caps and goals as of 10 August 2011

Lee Jae-sung (Korean: 이재성; Hanja: 李宰誠; born 5 July 1988) is a South Korean retired football defender.

In January 2019, he moved to Incheon United.

== Honours ==
Ulsan Hyundai

- AFC Champions League (1): 2012
