= Choi Bo-kyung =

South Korean footballer (born 1988)

Personal information
- Date of birth: 12 April 1988 (age 38)
- Place of birth: Gwangyang, South Korea
- Height: 6 ft 1 in (1.85 m)
- Position: Defender

Team information
- Current team: Chungnam Asan
- Number: 20

Youth career
- 2003: Jeonnam Dragons
- 2004–2006: Choji High School
- 2007–2010: Dongguk University

Senior career*
Years	Team	Apps	(Gls)
2011–2013	Ulsan Hyundai	36	(1)
2014–2022	Jeonbuk Hyundai Motors	132	(2)
2016–2017	→ Asan Mugunghwa (loan)	39	(2)
2023	Suwon FC	13	(0)
2024–2025	Arema	17	(0)
2025–	Chungnam Asan	3	(0)
- * Club domestic league appearances and goals as of August 6, 2026

Choi Bo-kyung (Korean: 최보경; Hanja: 崔普慶; born April 12, 1988) is a South Korean professional footballer who plays for the Chungnam Asan football club as an defender and defensive midfielder.

== Club career ==
After graduating from Choji High School and Dongguk University, Choi joined the Ulsan Hyundai football club through the 2011 K League draft. By the 2013 season, his third year with the club, he had established himself as a regular starter, appearing in 29 league matches that year.

Ahead of the 2014 season, Choi transferred to the Jeonbuk Hyundai Motors football club, where he and his team won the K League Classic title.

After the 2015 season, Choi began his mandatory military service after joining Ansan Mugunghwa FC. He completed his service and returned to Jeonbuk on September 23, 2017.

Before the start of the 2023 season, Choi moved to Suwon FC and then to Arema FC the following year. He later to moved to Chungnam Asan FC in May 2025.

== International career ==
On June 1, 2015, Choi was invited to join the South Korean national soccer team for a friendly match against the United Arab Emirates and a second-round qualifying match for the 2018 FIFA World Cup against Myanmar. He did not make an appearance in either match.

== Honors ==
Ulsan Hyundai

- AFC Champions League: 2012

Jeonbuk Hyundai Motors

- K League 1: 2014

Arema

- Piala Presiden: 2024
