= Maranhão (footballer, born 1984) =

Brazilian footballer

Personal information
- Full name: Luis Carlos dos Santos Martins
- Date of birth: June 19, 1984 (age 42)
- Place of birth: São Luís, Maranhão, Brazil
- Height: 1.75 m (5 ft 9 in)
- Position: Striker

Team information
- Current team: North Bangkok University
- Number: 23

Senior career*
Years	Team	Apps	(Gls)
2005–2006	Sertãozinho		
2006	Comercial		
2007	Monte Azul		
2007–2008	Sertãozinho		
2008	→ Monte Azul (loan)		
2008	→ Marília (loan)	3	(0)
2008	→ Ventforet Kofu (loan)	17	(9)
2009–2012	Ventforet Kofu	76	(28)
2011	→ Tokyo Verdy (loan)	27	(9)
2012	→ Ulsan Hyundai (loan)	39	(13)
2013	Jeju United	31	(7)
2014	Al-Qadisiyah		
2014–2015	Naft Masjed Soleyman	13	(2)
2015	Ventforet Kofu	2	(0)
2016	Monte Azul	12	(0)
2016–2017	Gangwon FC	12	(1)
2017	Zwegabin United		
2018	Trat	0	(0)
2018–	North Bangkok University		
- * Club domestic league appearances and goals as of 00:08, 7 January 2018 (UTC)

Luis Carlos dos Santos Martins, or simply Maranhão (born June 19, 1984, in São Luís, Maranhão), is a Brazilian striker. He currently plays for North Bangkok University.

== Club statistics ==
Club performance			League		Cup		Total	
Season	Club	League	Apps	Goals	Apps	Goals	Apps	Goals
Japan			League		Emperor's Cup		Total	
2008	Ventforet Kofu	J2 League	17	9	2	1	19	10
2009	Ventforet Kofu	J2 League	48	19	2	1	50	20
2010	Ventforet Kofu	J2 League	26	9	1	0	27	9
2011	Tokyo Verdy	J2 League	27	9	-	-	27	9
Country	Japan		118	46	5	2	123	48
Total			118	46	5	2	123	48

== Honours ==
Ulsan Hyundai

- AFC Champions League: 2012
