= Kim Young-sam (footballer) =

South Korean footballer (born 1982)

Personal information
- Full name: Kim Young-sam
- Date of birth: April 4, 1982 (age 44)
- Place of birth: South Korea
- Height: 1.74 m (5 ft 9 in)
- Positions: Full back; defensive midfielder

Youth career
- Korea University

Senior career*
Years	Team	Apps	(Gls)
2005–2016	Ulsan Hyundai	163	(4)
2010–2011	→ Sangju Sangmu (army)	28	(0)
- * Club domestic league appearances and goals

- Kim Young-sam
- Hangul: 김영삼
- Hanja: 金英三
- RR: Gim Yeongsam
- MR: Kim Yŏngsam

Kim Young-sam (born April 4, 1982) is a retired South Korean football player who played for Ulsan Hyundai FC.

== Honours ==
Ulsan Hyundai

- AFC Champions League (1): 2012
