= Julián Estiven Vélez =

Colombian footballer (born 1982)

Juan Estiven Vélez
Personal information
- Full name: Juan Estiven Vélez Upegui
- Date of birth: 9 February 1982 (age 44)
- Place of birth: Medellín, Colombia
- Height: 1.72 m (5 ft 8 in)
- Positions: Left back; defensive midfielder

Youth career
- Atlético Nacional

Senior career*
Years	Team	Apps	(Gls)
2004–2006	Deportes Quindío	57	(0)
2006	Deportivo Pereira	27	(0)
2007–2009	Atlético Nacional	55	(1)
2010–2012	Ulsan Hyundai	90	(1)
2013	Vissel Kobe	28	(0)
2014	Jeju United	12	(0)
2014–2015	Tokushima Vortis	44	(2)

International career
2006–2008	Colombia	15	(0)
- * Club domestic league appearances and goals

Juan Estiven Vélez Upegui (born in Medellín, Antioquia. 9 February 1982) is a retired Colombian footballer. He played as a left back defender or defensive midfielder.

== Club career ==
Born In Medellin, Velez began his career in the youth ranks of Atlético Nacional. In 2004, he made his debut with the Categoría Primera B club Deportes Quindío. In 2006, he joined Deportivo Pereira. The following year, he joined Nacional, where he was part of the squad that won the 2007 Finalizacion. After a poor collective 2009 season, he left the club.

In 2010, he joined South Korean club Ulsan Hyundai, where he won the 2012 AFC Champions League, and playing the full 90 minutes in the 3–0 victory against Al-Ahli.

He retired after the 2014–15 season, playing his final season with Tokushima Vortis in the Japanese League.

== International career ==
He made his debut for the Colombia national team in 2006, and played in the 2007 Copa America. He played for the national team from 2006 to 2008.

== Honours ==
Atlético Nacional
- Categoria Primera A: 2007 Finalizacion
Ulsan Hyundai

- AFC Champions League: 2012
