= Kwak Tae-hwi =

South Korean footballer (born 1981)

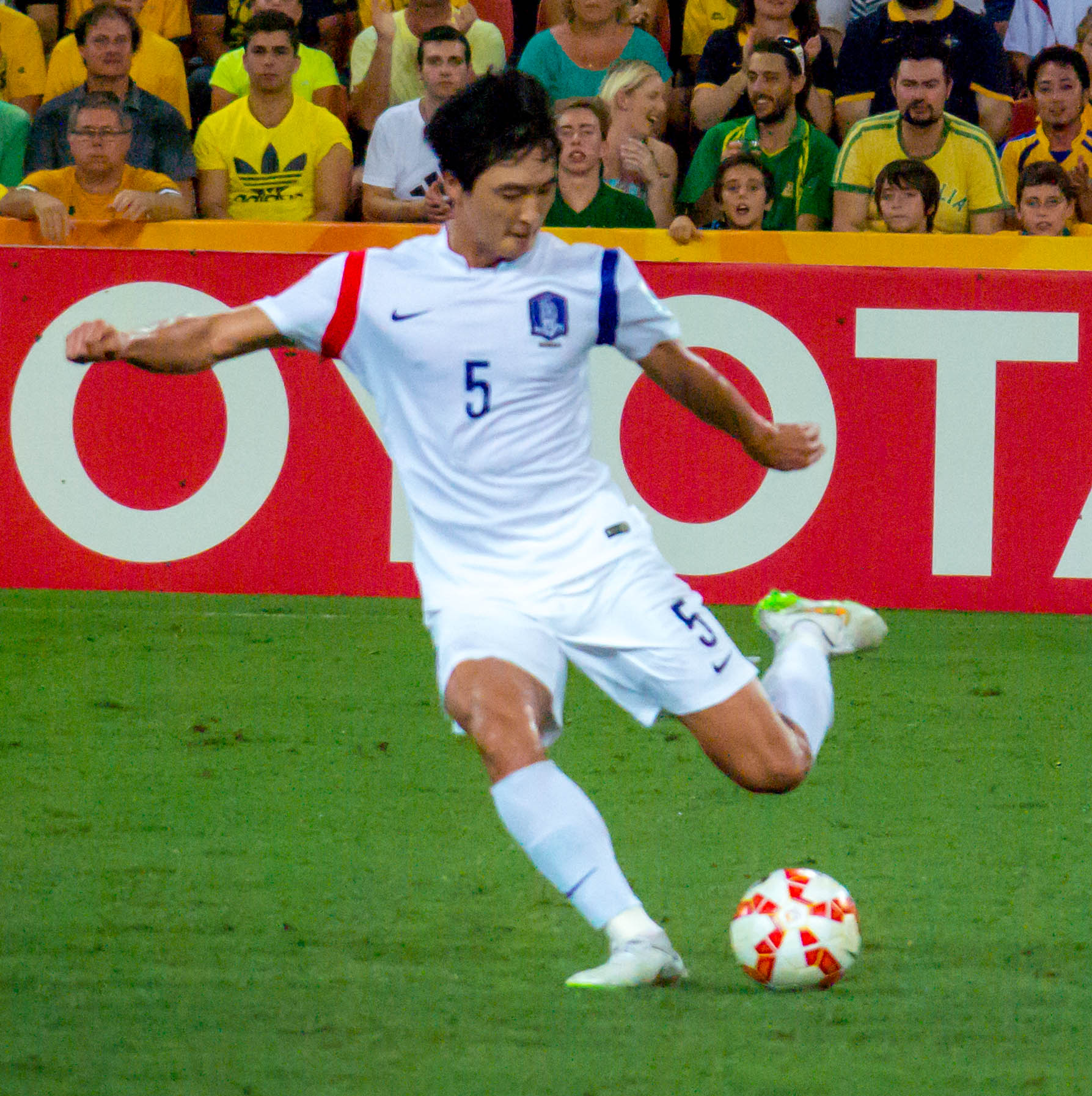
- Kwak with South Korea at the 2015 AFC Asian Cup

Personal information
- Full name: Kwak Tae-hwi
- Date of birth: 8 July 1981 (age 45)
- Place of birth: Chilgok, Gyeongbuk, South Korea
- Height: 1.86 m (6 ft 1 in)
- Position: Centre-back

College career
Years	Team	Apps	(Gls)
2000–2003	Chung-Ang University		

Senior career*
Years	Team	Apps	(Gls)
2005–2007	FC Seoul	28	(1)
2007–2009	Jeonnam Dragons	33	(1)
2010	Kyoto Sanga FC	24	(2)
2011–2012	Ulsan Hyundai	66	(12)
2013	Al-Shabab	16	(2)
2013–2016	Al-Hilal	42	(2)
2016–2018	FC Seoul	49	(3)
2019	Gyeongnam FC	16	(0)
Total		274	(23)

International career
2003	South Korea Universiade		
2008–2017	South Korea	58	(5)

Managerial career
- 2021-2023: Chengdu Rongcheng (assistant)
Medal record
Representing South Korea
Men's football
AFC Asian Cup
Runner-up	2015 Australia
Bronze medal – third place	2011 Qatar
EAFF Championship
Winner	2008 China
Runner-up	2010 Japan
- * Club domestic league appearances and goals

- Kwak Tae-hwi
- Hangul: 곽태휘
- Hanja: 郭泰輝
- RR: Gwak Taehwi
- MR: Kwak T'aehwi

Kwak Tae-hwi (Korean: 곽태휘; [kwak̚.tʰεçy] or [kwak̚.tʰεɦwi]; born 8 July 1981) is a former South Korean football player. He was blind in his left eye since his youth, but became a centre-back of the South Korea national football team.

== Career statistics ==
Appearances and goals by club, season and competition
Club	Season	League			National cup		League cup		Continental		Other		Total	
Club	Season	Division	Apps	Goals	Apps	Goals	Apps	Goals	Apps	Goals	Apps	Goals	Apps	Goals
FC Seoul	2005	K League	11	1	2	0	8	0	—		—		21	1
FC Seoul	2006	K League	12	0	1	0	11	1	—		—		24	1
FC Seoul	2007	K League	5	0	1	0	7	0	—		—		13	0
FC Seoul	Total		28	1	4	0	26	1	—		—		58	2
Jeonnam Dragons	2007	K League	13	1	5	1	0	0	0	0	—		18	2
Jeonnam Dragons	2008	K League	10	0	0	0	3	2	0	0	—		13	2
Jeonnam Dragons	2009	K League	10	0	0	0	0	0	—		—		10	0
Jeonnam Dragons	Total		33	1	5	1	3	2	0	0	—		41	4
Kyoto Sanga	2010	J1 League	24	2	1	0	2	0	—		—		27	2
Ulsan Hyundai	2011	K League	34	9	4	0	7	0	—		—		45	9
Ulsan Hyundai	2012	K League	32	3	3	0	—		12	2	2 (Note: Appearances in FIFA Club World Cup)	0	49	5
Ulsan Hyundai	Total		66	12	7	0	7	0	12	2	2	0	94	14
Al-Shabab	2012–13	Saudi Pro League	6	1	5	0	0	0	9	0	—		20	1
Al-Shabab	2013–14	Saudi Pro League	10	1	0	0	1	0	—		—		11	1
Al-Shabab	Total		16	2	5	0	1	0	9	0	—		31	2
Al-Hilal	2013–14	Saudi Pro League	2	1	0	0	0	0	10	0	—		12	1
Al-Hilal	2014–15	Saudi Pro League	21	1	4	1	3	0	12	0	—		40	2
Al-Hilal	2015–16	Saudi Pro League	19	0	3	0	3	0	6	0	1 (Note: Appearance in Saudi Super Cup)	0	32	0
Al-Hilal	Total		42	2	7	1	6	0	28	0	1	0	84	3
FC Seoul	2016	K League 1	11	0	2	0	—		4	0	—		17	0
FC Seoul	2017	K League 1	24	2	1	0	—		2	0	—		27	2
FC Seoul	2018	K League 1	14	1	2	0	—		—		—		16	1
FC Seoul	Total		49	3	5	0	—		6	0	—		60	3
Gyeongnam FC	2019	K League 1	16	0	1	1	—		1	1	—		18	2
Career total			274	23	35	3	45	3	56	3	3	0	413	32

=== International ===
Appearances and goals by national team and year
National team	!Year	Apps	Goals
South Korea	2008	7	3
South Korea	2009	1	0
South Korea	2010	8	1
South Korea	2011	5	0
South Korea	2012	7	1
South Korea	2013	5	0
South Korea	2014	4	0
South Korea	2015	13	0
South Korea	2016	6	0
South Korea	2017	2	0
Total		58	5

Scores and results list South Korea's goal tally first.

List of international goals scored by Kwak Tae-hwi
No.	Date	Venue	Opponent	Score	Result	Competition
1	2 February 2008	Seoul, South Korea	Turkmenistan	1–0	4–0	2010 FIFA World Cup qualification
2	17 February 2008	Chongqing, China	China	3–2	3–2	2008 EAFF Championship
3	15 October 2008	Seoul, South Korea	United Arab Emirates	4–1	4–1	2010 FIFA World Cup qualification
4	3 March 2010	London, England	Ivory Coast	2–0	2–0	Friendly
5	8 June 2012	Doha, Qatar	Qatar	2–1	4–1	2014 FIFA World Cup qualification

== Honours ==
FC Seoul

- K League 1: 2016
- Korean League Cup: 2006
- Korean FA Cup runner-up: 2016

Jeonnam Dragons

- Korean FA Cup: 2007
- Korean League Cup runner-up: 2008

Ulsan Hyundai

- AFC Champions League: 2012
- Korean League Cup: 2011

Al–Shabab

- King Cup runner-up: 2013

Al-Hilal

- King Cup: 2015
- Saudi Crown Prince Cup: 2015–16
- Saudi Super Cup: 2015
- AFC Champions League runner-up: 2014

South Korea

- AFC Asian Cup runner-up: 2015
- EAFF Championship: 2008

Individual

- K League 1 Best XI: 2011, 2012
- K League All-Star: 2012, 2017
- AFC Champions League Dream Team: 2014
- AFC Asian Cup Team of the Tournament: 2015
- AFC Champions League All-Star Squad: 2016

Sporting positions
Preceded by Song Jung-hyun	Jeonnam Dragons captain 2008	Succeeded by Yeom Dong-gyun
