= Kim Seung-yong =

South Korean footballer (born 1985)

Kim Seung-yong 김승용 金承龍
Personal information
- Full name: Kim Seung-yong
- Date of birth: 14 March 1985 (age 41)
- Place of birth: Seoul, South Korea
- Height: 1.81 m (5 ft 11 in)
- Positions: Forward; winger

Senior career*
Years	Team	Apps	(Gls)
2004–2009	FC Seoul	47	(3)
2007–2008	→ Gwangju Sangmu (military service)	28	(1)
2010	Jeonbuk Hyundai Motors	4	(0)
2011	Gamba Osaka	28	(4)
2012–2013	Ulsan Hyundai	61	(5)
2014	Central Coast Mariners	14	(3)
2015	Qingdao Hainiu	23	(4)
2016	Buriram United	16	(3)
2016	→ Suphanburi (loan)	11	(0)
2017–2018	Gangwon FC	49	(4)
2019	Incheon United	2	(0)
2020	Tai Po	0	(0)
2021–2022	Lee Man	16	(5)
Total		306	(32)

International career
2003–2005	South Korea U-20	26	(8)
2006–2008	South Korea U-23	17	(1)
- * Club domestic league appearances and goals as of 27 June 2022

- Kim Seung-yong
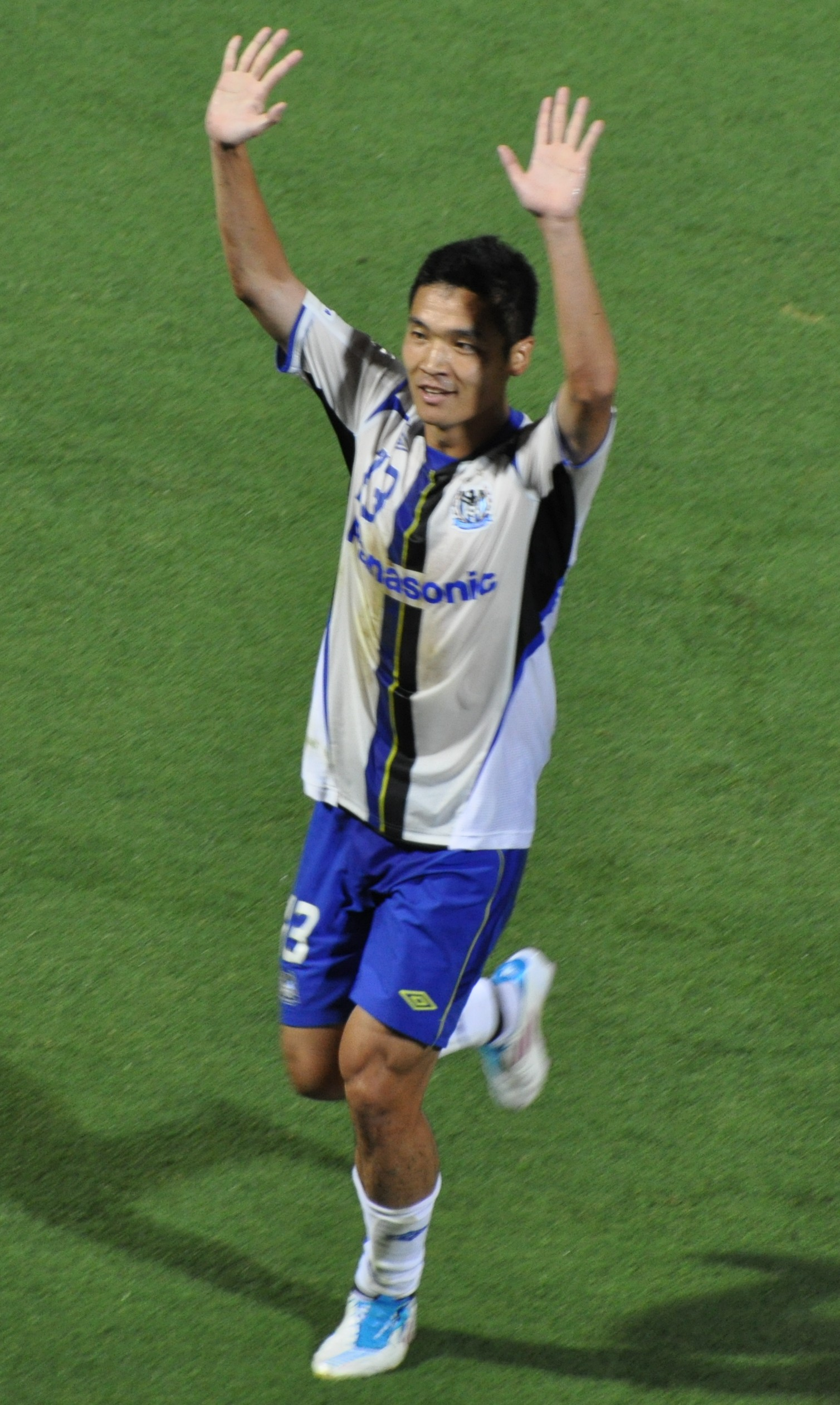

Korean name
- Hangul: 김승용
- Hanja: 金承龍
- RR: Gim Seungyong
- MR: Kim Sŭngyong

Kim Seung-yong (Korean: 김승용; Hanja: 金承龍; born 14 March 1985) is a former South Korean professional footballer.

He has also played in Australia, Japan, China and Thailand during his career.

== Career statistics ==
=== Club ===
Appearances and goals by club, season and competition
Club	Season	League			Cup		League Cup		Continental		Other		Total	
Club	Season	Division	Apps	Goals	Apps	Goals	Apps	Goals	Apps	Goals	Apps	Goals	Apps	Goals
FC Seoul	2004	K League	3	0	1	0	11	0	—		—		15	0
FC Seoul	2005	K League	14	1	2	0	6	0	—		—		22	1
FC Seoul	2006	K League	6	0	1	1	7	1	—		—		14	2
FC Seoul	2008	K League	1	1	0	0	0	0	—		—		1	1
FC Seoul	2009	K League	23	1	1	0	4	0	6	1	—		34	2
FC Seoul	Total		47	3	5	1	28	1	6	1	—		86	6
Gwangju Sangmu (army)	2007	K League	16	0	2	0	7	0	—		—		25	0
Gwangju Sangmu (army)	2008	K League	12	1	1	1	7	2	—		—		20	4
Gwangju Sangmu (army)	Total		28	1	3	1	14	2	—		—		45	4
Jeonbuk Hyundai Motors	2010	K League	4	0	1	0	1	1	3	1	—		9	2
Gamba Osaka	2011	J1 League	28	4	2	2	0	0	7	1	—		37	7
Ulsan Hyundai	2012	K League	34	3	3	0	—		12	3	2	0	51	6
Ulsan Hyundai	2013	K League Classic	27	2	2	2	—		—		—		29	4
Ulsan Hyundai	Total		61	5	5	2	—		12	3	2	0	80	10
Central Coast Mariners	2013–14	A-League	9	2	—		—		5	0	—		14	2
Central Coast Mariners	2014–15	A-League	5	1	0	0	—		—		—		5	1
Central Coast Mariners	Total		14	3	0	0	—		5	0	—		19	3
Qingdao Hainiu	2015	China League One	23	4	0	0	—		—		—		23	4
Buriram United	2016	Thai Premier League	16	3	0	0	0	0	0	0	—		16	3
Suphanburi (loan)	2016	Thai Premier League	11	0	0	0	—		—		—		11	0
Gangwon FC	2017	K League Classic	34	3	2	0	—		—		—		36	3
Gangwon FC	2018	K League 1	15	1	0	0	—		—		—		15	1
Gangwon FC	Total		49	4	2	0	—		—		—		51	4
Incheon United	2019	K League 1	9	0	0	0	—		—		—		9	0
Tai Po	2019–20	Hong Kong Premier League	0	0	3	1	—		0	0	2	3	5	4
Lee Man	2020–21	Hong Kong Premier League	14	4	—		—		3	1	1	0	18	5
Lee Man	2021–22	Hong Kong Premier League	2	1	1	0	—		4	0	5	1	12	2
Lee Man	Total		16	5	1	0	—		7	1	6	1	30	7
Career total			306	32	22	7	43	4	40	6	10	4	421	53

== Honours ==
=== Club ===
Ulsan Hyundai

- AFC Champions League: 2012

=== International ===
- AFC U-19 Championship: 2004
