= Rafinha (footballer, born 1987) =

Brazilian footballer

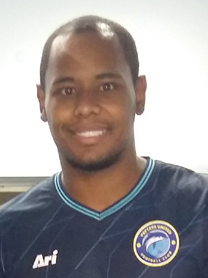
- Rafinha with Pattaya United in 2018

Personal information
- Full name: Rafael dos Santos de Oliveira
- Date of birth: 30 June 1987 (age 39)
- Place of birth: Osasco, Brazil
- Height: 1.72 m (5 ft 8 in)
- Position: Striker

Senior career*
| Years | Team | Apps | (Gls) |
| 2004–2013 | Nacional-SP | | |
| 2007 | → Avispa Fukuoka (loan) | 2 | (0) |
| 2008 | → Paulista (loan) | | |
| 2008 | → Atlético Juventus (loan) | | |
| 2009 | → Votoraty (loan) | | |
| 2010–2011 | → Thespa Kusatsu (loan) | 49 | (13) |
| 2011–2012 | → Gamba Osaka (loan) | 27 | (14) |
| 2012–2013 | → Ulsan Hyundai (loan) | 41 | (17) |
| 2014 | Ulsan Hyundai | 12 | (1) |
| 2014–2016 | Yokohama F. Marinos | 18 | (5) |
| 2017 | GO Audax | 2 | (0) |
| 2017 | Paraná | 3 | (0) |
| 2018 | Pattaya United | 9 | (1) |
| Total | | 159 | (51) |
- * Club domestic league appearances and goals

Rafael dos Santos de Oliveira (born 30 June 1987), commonly known as Rafinha, is a Brazilian footballer who plays as a striker.

Rafinha scored in the final as Ulsan Hyundai defeated Al-Ahli of Saudi Arabia to win the 2012 AFC Champions League. He subsequently represented Ulsan Hyundai in the 2012 FIFA Club World Cup, playing in both matches and earning recognition in FIFA's official technical report.

== Career statistics ==
=== Club ===
Appearances and goals by club, season and competition
| Club | Season | League | | | State League | | Cup | | League Cup | | Continental | | Other | | Total | |
| Club | Season | Division | Apps | Goals | Apps | Goals | Apps | Goals | Apps | Goals | Apps | Goals | Apps | Goals | Apps | Goals |
|---|---|---|---|---|---|---|---|---|---|---|---|---|---|---|---|---|
| Avispa Fukuoka | 2007 | J2 League | 2 | 0 | — | | 0 | 0 | — | | — | | — | | 2 | 0 |
| Thespa Kusatsu (loan) | 2010 | J2 League | 34 | 8 | — | | 1 | 0 | — | | — | | — | | 35 | 8 |
| Thespa Kusatsu (loan) | 2011 | J2 League | 15 | 5 | — | | 0 | 0 | — | | — | | — | | 15 | 5 |
| Thespa Kusatsu (loan) | Total | | 49 | 13 | — | | 1 | 0 | — | | — | | — | | 50 | 13 |
| Gamba Osaka (loan) | 2011 | J1 League | 17 | 11 | — | | 0 | 0 | 2 | 1 | — | | — | | 19 | 12 |
| Gamba Osaka (loan) | 2012 | J1 League | 10 | 3 | — | | — | | — | | 6 | 2 | — | | 16 | 5 |
| Gamba Osaka (loan) | Total | | 27 | 14 | — | | 0 | 0 | 2 | 1 | 6 | 2 | — | | 35 | 17 |
| Ulsan Hyundai (loan) | 2012 | K-League | 17 | 6 | — | | 2 | 1 | — | | 5 | 5 | 2 | 0 | 26 | 12 |
| Ulsan Hyundai (loan) | 2013 | K League Classic | 24 | 11 | — | | 1 | 0 | — | | — | | — | | 25 | 11 |
| Ulsan Hyundai | 2014 | K League Classic | 12 | 1 | — | | 0 | 0 | — | | 5 | 2 | — | | 17 | 3 |
| Ulsan Hyundai | Ulsan total | | 53 | 18 | — | | 3 | 1 | — | | 10 | 7 | 2 | 0 | 68 | 26 |
| Yokohama F. Marinos | 2014 | J1 League | 8 | 4 | — | | 0 | 0 | 0 | 0 | — | | — | | 8 | 4 |
| Yokohama F. Marinos | 2015 | J1 League | 10 | 1 | — | | 0 | 0 | 3 | 1 | — | | — | | 13 | 2 |
| Yokohama F. Marinos | Total | | 18 | 5 | — | | 0 | 0 | 3 | 1 | — | | — | | 21 | 6 |
| GO Audax | 2017 | Paulista | — | | 2 | 0 | 1 | 0 | — | | — | | — | | 3 | 0 |
| Paraná | 2017 | Série B | 1 | 0 | — | | — | | — | | — | | — | | 1 | 0 |
| Pattaya United | 2018 | Thai League 1 | 9 | 1 | — | | — | | — | | — | | — | | 9 | 1 |
| Career total | | | 159 | 51 | 2 | 0 | 5 | 1 | 5 | 2 | 16 | 9 | 2 | 0 | 189 | 63 |

== Honours ==
Ulsan Hyundai

- AFC Champions League (1): 2012

== Externaler links ==
- Rafinha at J.League (archive) (in Japanese)
- Rafinha – K League stats at kleague.com (in Korean and English)
