= 2012 Gangwon FC season =

Gangwon FC
2012 season
- Chairman: Gangwon provincial governor
- Manager: Kim Sang-ho (until July 1, 2012); Kim Hak-Beom (since July 6, 2012)
- K-League: 15th
- Korean FA Cup: Round of 16
- Top goalscorer: League: Kim Eun-Jung (13); All: Kim Eun-Jung (13)
- Highest home attendance: 6,932 vs Sangju (May 5)
- Lowest home attendance: 80 vs Korea Univ. (May 23)
- Average home league attendance: 3,188 (as of October 21)
Home colours	Away colours

The 2012 season was Gangwon FC's fourth season in the K-League in South Korea. Gangwon FC will be competing in K-League and Korean FA Cup.

== Current squad ==
Note: Flags indicate national team as defined under FIFA eligibility rules; some limited exceptions apply. Players may hold more than one non-FIFA nationality.

No.	Pos.	Nation	Player
1	GK	KOR	Kim Keun-Bae
2	DF	KOR	Lee Sang-don
3	DF	KOR	Lee Min-Kyu
4	DF	KOR	Oh Jae-Suk
5	DF	KOR	Bae Hyo-Sung (Vice-captain)
6	MF	BIH	Muhamed Džakmić
7	MF	KOR	Baek Jong-Hwan
8	FW	KOR	Han Dong-Won
9	FW	KOR	Shim Young-Sung (on loan from Jeju)
10	MF	JPN	Yusuke Shimada
11	FW	KOR	Kim Myung-Joong
12	DF	KOR	Lee Jae-Hun
13	DF	KOR	Park Sang-Jin
14	DF	KOR	Kim Jin-Hwan
15	DF	KOR	Kim Oh-Gyu
16	FW	KOR	Kim Jung-Joo
17	FW	KOR	Jung Sung-Min
18	FW	KOR	Kim Eun-Jung (Captain)
19	FW	BRA	Wesley (on loan from Corinthians)
20	MF	KOR	Kim Tae-Min
21	GK	KOR	Song Yoo-Geol
22	MF	KOR	Denis Laktionov
23	DF	KOR	Chun Jae-Ho

No.	Pos.	Nation	Player
24	MF	KOR	Lee Woo-Hyeok
25	MF	KOR	Oh Won-Jong
26	MF	KOR	Jang Seok-Min
27	FW	KOR	Jang Hyuk-Jin
28	DF	KOR	Lee Jun-Hyung
29	FW	KOR	Kim Dong-Ki
30	FW	KOR	Ko Min-Joo
31	GK	KOR	Yang Han-Been
32	MF	KOR	Kim Jong-Gook (on loan from Ulsan)
33	DF	KOR	Park Woo-Hyun
34	FW	KOR	Kim Do-Hun
35	DF	KOR	Lee Bong-Jun
36	DF	KOR	Na Byeong-Hwan
37	DF	KOR	Ma Sang-Hoon
38	DF	KOR	Yang Yun-Hyeok
39	MF	KOR	Moon Kyung-Min
40	FW	KOR	Park Jae-Bum
41	DF	KOR	Ham Min-Seok
42	DF	KOR	Lee Yoon-Ho
43	DF	KOR	Kang Min-Woo
77	DF	KOR	Lee Yoon-Eui
83	MF	ROU	Ianis Zicu (on loan from Pohang)
99	FW	KOR	Park Jung-Hoon (on loan from Chunnam)

=== Out on loan ===
Note: Flags indicate national team as defined under FIFA eligibility rules; some limited exceptions apply. Players may hold more than one non-FIFA nationality.

No.	Pos.	Nation	Player
—	MF	KOR	Kim Jin-Yong (to Pohang Steelers until 2012 season)
—	MF	KOR	Kim Joon-Beom (to Gangneung City until 2012 season)
—	MF	KOR	Lee Jung-Woon (to Gangneung City until 2012 season)

No.	Pos.	Nation	Player
—	FW	KOR	Kim Young-Hoo (to National Police Agency until 2013 season)
—	MF	KOR	Kim Moon-Soo (to National Police Agency until 2013 season)

== Transfer ==
=== In ===
No.	Pos.	Nation	Player
—	MF	KOR	Chang Hyuk-Jin (loan return from Gangneung City)
—	DF	KOR	Lee Jae-Hoon (draft(1st) from Yonsei University)
—	FW	KOR	Kim Dong-Ki (draft(2nd) from Kyunghee University)
—	MF	KOR	Kim Jun-Beom (draft(4th) from Gangneung City)
—	FW	KOR	Ko Min-Ju (draft(Extra) from Munseong High School)
—	DF	KOR	Bae Hyo-Sung (from Incheon United)
—	DF	KOR	Na Byeong-Hwan (draft(supplement) from Chuncheon Citizen)
—	DF	KOR	Yang Yun-Hyeok (draft(supplement) from Wonkwang University)
—	FW	KOR	Kim Eun-Jung (from Jeju United)
—	GK	KOR	Song Yoo-Geol (from Incheon United)
—	DF	KOR	Oh Jae-Seok (from Suwon Samsung Bluewings)
—	MF	KOR	Kim Tae-Min (from Jeju United)
—	FW	KOR	Kim Myung-Joong (from Chunnam Dragons)
—	FW	KOR	Park Jae-Bum (draft(supplement) from Goyang Citizen)
—	MF	KOR	Moon Kyung-Min (draft(supplement) from Jeonju University)
—	DF	KOR	Lee Bong-Jun (draft(supplement) from Gangneung City)
—	DF	KOR	Ham Min-Seok (from Bucheon FC 1995)
—	FW	BRA	Wesley (loan from Corinthians (1 year))
—	MF	KOR	Noh Yong-Hun (from Tokushima Vortis)
—	MF	JPN	Yusuke Shimada (from Daejeon Citizen)
—	FW	KOR	Kim Do-Hoon (from Pohang Steelers)
—	FW	KOR	Shim Young-Sung (loan from Jeju United)
—	MF	KOR	Park Jung-Hoon (loan from Chunnam Dragons)
—	FW	ROU	Ianis Zicu (loan from Pohang Steelers (6 months))
—	DF	KOR	Jeon Jae-Ho (from Busan IPark)
—	FW	KOR	Denis Laktionov (from Tom Tomsk)
—	FW	KOR	Han Dong-Won (from Seongnam Ilhwa)
—	MF	KOR	Kim Jong-Gook (loan from Ulsan Hyundai)
—	DF	KOR	Lee Yoon-Ho (from Ulsan Mipo Dockyard)
—	FW	KOR	Oh Won-Jong (from Sangju Sangmu Phoenix)
—	DF	KOR	Lee Yoon-Eui (from Sangju Sangmu Phoenix)
—	DF	KOR	Kang Min-Woo (from Sangju Sangmu Phoenix)

=== Out ===
No.	Pos.	Nation	Player
10	FW	KOR	Kim Young-Hoo (to Police FC(military duty))
43	DF	KOR	Kim Moon-Soo (to Police FC(military duty))
27	FW	KOR	Seo Dong-Hyun (to Jeju United)
51	GK	KOR	Yoo Hyun (to Incheon United)
4	DF	KOR	Kwak Kwang-Seon (to Suwon Samsung Bluewings)
14	MF	KOR	Kwon Soon-Hyung (to Jeju United)
16	FW	KOR	Chung Kyung-Ho (to Daejeon Citizen)
—	MF	KOR	Ahn Sung-Nam (to Gwangju FC, previously on loan)
13	FW	KOR	Yoon Jun-Ha (to Incheon United)
18	FW	KOR	Kim Jin-Yong (loan(1 year) to Pohang Steelers)
20	MF	KOR	Ha Jung-Heon (released, to Goyang KB)
25	MF	KOR	Nam Gwang-Hyun (released, (Thailand) Suphanburi)
29	FW	KOR	Yang Jung-Min (released)
30	MF	KOR	Moon Kyung-Joo (released, to Paju Citizen)
32	DF	KOR	Park Jong-In (released)
33	DF	KOR	Lee Kyung-Soo (released)
35	FW	KOR	Heo Min-Hyuk (released)
37	FW	KOR	Kim Seok (released)
38	MF	KOR	Lee Hun (released)
40	MF	KOR	Kim Woo-Kyung (released)
41	GK	KOR	Kim Se-Jun (released, to Gyeongnam FC)
42	MF	KOR	Lee Shin-Kyu (released)
45	FW	KOR	Lee Joong-Gwan (released)
9	FW	CRO	Mateas Delić (released, to (Croatia) Slaven Belupo)
8	MF	KOR	Park Tae-Woong (released, to Suwon Bluewings)
25	MF	KOR	Kim Eun-Hu (released)
32	MF	KOR	Noh Yong-Hun (released, to Daejeon Citizen)
22	MF	KOR	Kim Joon-Beom (loan to Gangneung City (6 months))
23	MF	KOR	Lee Jung-Woon (loan to Gangneung City (6 months))

== Coaching staff ==
To 1 July 2012

Position	Staff
Manager	(South Korea) Kim Sang-ho
Assistant Manager	(South Korea) Roh Sang-Rae
Coach	(South Korea) Shin Jin-Won
Coach	(South Korea) Choi Sung-Yong
GK Coach	(South Korea) Kim Bum-Soo
Physical coach	(Japan) Hiroshi Yamada

Last updated: 11 November 2011
Source: Gangwon FC

From 18 July 2012

Position	Staff
Manager	(South Korea) Kim Hak-Beom
Assistant Manager	(South Korea) Kim Hyung-Yeol
Coach	(South Korea) Lee Min-Sung
Coach	(South Korea) Lee Eul-Yong
Coach	(South Korea) Jeon Hwan-Chul
GK Coach	(South Korea) Kim Tae-Su
Physical coach	(Japan) Hiroshi Yamada

Last updated: 18 July 2012
Source: Gangwon FC

== Match results ==
=== K-League ===
All times are Korea Standard Time (KST) – UTC+9

Date Round	Home	Score	Away	Location

4 March 1	Chunnam	0 – 0	Gangwon	Gwangyang, Jeonnam
15:00		Report		Stadium: Gwangyang Football Stadium; Attendance: 4,355; Referee: An Yong-Hee

10 March 2	Gangwon	2 – 0	Daegu	Gangneung, Gangwon
15:00	Kim Eun-Jung 64' (Assist by No.4); Kim Eun-Jung 75' (pen.)	Report	Kang Yong (yellow card) 48' (yellow-red card) 73'	Stadium: Gangneung Stadium; Attendance: 5,153; Referee: Mun Jin-Hee

17 March 3	Suwon	3 – 0	Gangwon	Suwon, Gyeonggi
15:00	Radončić 28', 75'; Ha Tae-Gyun 78'	Report		Stadium: Suwon World Cup Stadium; Attendance: 9,227; Referee: Kim Wan-Tae

25 March 4	Gangwon	1 – 2	Seongnam	Gangneung, Gangwon
15:00	Shimada 57' (Free kick)	Report	Éverton Santos 24', 37'	Stadium: Gangneung Stadium; Attendance: 5,172; Referee: Kim Dae-Yong

1 April 5	Gwangju	1 – 1	Gangwon	Seo-gu, Gwangju
15:00	Milić 90+3'	Report	Kim Myung-Joong 41' (Assist by No.5)	Stadium: Gwangju World Cup Stadium; Attendance: 4,515; Referee: Woo Sang-Il

7 April 6	Gangwon	2 – 1	Incheon	Gangneung, Gangwon
15:00	Kim Eun-Jung 19' (pen.); Kim Eun-Jung 79' (Assist by No.10)	Report	Seol Ki-Hyeon 46'	Stadium: Gangneung Stadium; Attendance: 3,266; Referee: Hong Jin-Ho

11 April 7	Gangwon	0 – 1	Jeonbuk	Gangneung, Gangwon
17:00		Report	Luiz 69'	Stadium: Gangneung Stadium; Attendance: 3,454; Referee: Lee Min-Hu

15 April 8	Gyeongnam	0 – 2	Gangwon	Changwon, Gyeongnam
15:00		Report	Kim Eun-Jung 28' (pen.); Jung Sung-Min 62' (Assist by No.10)	Stadium: Changwon Football Center; Attendance: 1,762; Referee: Ko Hyung-Jin

21 April 9	Busan	1 – 0	Gangwon	Yeonje-gu, Busan
17:00	Choi Jin-Ho 25'	Report		Stadium: Busan Asiad Stadium; Attendance: 929; Referee: An Yong-Hee

29 April 10	Gangwon	1 – 2	Seoul	Gangneung, Gangwon
15:00	Bae Hyo-Sung 68'	Report	Molina 28'; Damjanović 90+4'	Stadium: Gangneung Stadium; Attendance: 5,013; Referee: Kim Jong-hyeok

5 May 11	Gangwon	0 – 3	Sangju	Gangneung, Gangwon
15:00		Report	Lee Sung-Jae 65', 89'; Kim Cheol-Ho 67'	Stadium: Gangneung Stadium; Attendance: 6,932; Referee: Kim Sung-Ho

13 May 12	Jeju	4 – 2	Gangwon	Seogwipo, Jeju
15:00	Jair 9', 35', 82' (pen.); Santos 49'	Report	Wesley 32' (Assist by No.17); Kim Eun-Jung 37' (pen.)	Stadium: Jeju World Cup Stadium; Attendance: 9,330; Referee: Choi Myung-Yong

20 May 13	Gangwon	1 – 2	Pohang	Gangneung, Gangwon
15:00	Jung Sung-Min 80' (Assist by No.4)	Report	Asamoah 7'; Ko Mu-Yeol 62'	Stadium: Gangneung Stadium; Attendance: 3,293; Referee: Lee Dong-Jun

26 May 14	Ulsan	1 – 2	Gangwon	Nam-gu, Ulsan
17:00	Ko Chang-Hyun 38'	Report	Kim Eun-Jung 37' (Assist by No.4); Jung Sung-Min 42' (Assist by No.18)	Stadium: Ulsan Munsu Football Stadium; Attendance: 11,373; Referee: Ko Hyung-Jin

14 June 15	Gangwon	0 – 2	Daejeon	Chuncheon, Gangwon
19:30	Park Tae-Woong (yellow card) 21' (yellow-red card) 90+2'	Report	Oris 35', 37'	Stadium: Chuncheon Stadium; Attendance: 2,400; Referee: Ko Keum-Bok

17 June 16	Sangju	2 – 1	Gangwon	Sangju, Gyeongbuk
19:00	Park Sang-Hee 90', 90+3'	Report	Chang Hyuk-Jin 86'	Stadium: Sangju Civic Stadium; Attendance: 3,345; Referee: Kim Sung-Ho

23 June 17	Gangwon	1 – 4	Suwon	Chuncheon, Gangwon
19:00	Kim Eun-Jung 82' (pen.)	Report	Yang Sang-Min 35'; Ha Tae-Goon 40'; Seo Jung-Jin 58'; Éverton 66' (pen.)	Stadium: Chuncheon Stadium; Attendance: 4,227; Referee: Kim Dong-Jin

27 June 18	Gangwon	0 – 3	Gyeongnam	Chuncheon, Gangwon
19:30		Report(English); Report(Korean)	Kang Seung-Jo 23'; Yun Il-Rok 56'; Caíque 63'	Stadium: Chuncheon Stadium; Attendance: 1,309; Referee: Kim Wan-Tae

30 June 19	Seongnam	1 – 2	Gangwon	Seongnam, Gyeonggi
19:00	Kim Sung-hwan 50'	Report(English); Report(Korean)	Kim Eun-jung 9' (Assist by No.19); Wesley 83'	Stadium: Tancheon Sports Complex; Attendance: 2,017; Referee: Ko Hyung-Jin

11 July 20	Daejeon	0 – 3	Gangwon	Yuseong-gu, Daejeon
19:00		Report(Korean)	Wesley 31' (Assist by No.18); Wesley 57'; Wesley 68' (Assist by No.27)	Stadium: Daejeon World Cup Stadium; Attendance: 6,161; Referee: Kim Jong-hyeok

15 July 21	Gangwon	1 – 2	Ulsan	Chuncheon, Gangwon
17:00	Kim Eun-Jung 41' (Assist by No.17)	Report(Korean)	Kim Shin-Wook 40'; Lee Keun-Ho 53'	Stadium: Chuncheon Stadium; Attendance: 2,557; Referee: An Yong-Hee

22 July 22	Jeonbuk	2 – 1	Gangwon	Jeonju, Jeonbuk
17:00	Kim Jung-Woo 7'; Lee Dong-Gook 27' (pen.); Jin Kyung-Sun (yellow card) 70' (yellow-red card) 72'	Report	Kim Eun-Jung 66' (pen.)	Stadium: Jeonju World Cup Stadium; Attendance: 12,248; Referee: Lee Dong-Jun

25 July 23	Pohang	1 – 2	Gangwon	Pohang, Gyeongbuk
19:30	No Byung-Jun 68'	Report	Kim Eun-Jung 31' (pen.); Park Jung-Hoon 77'	Stadium: Pohang Steel Yard; Attendance: 9,075; Referee: Choi Myung-Yong

29 July 24	Gangwon	0 – 0	Gwangju	Gangneung, Gangwon
19:00		Report		Stadium: Gangneung Stadium; Attendance: 3,586; Referee: Song Min-Seok

4 August 25	Seoul	3 – 2	Gangwon	Mapo-gu, Seoul
19:00	Damjanović 31'; Molina 62', 67'	Report	Wesley 6'; Jung Sung-Min 86' (Assist by No.19)	Stadium: Seoul World Cup Stadium; Attendance: 13,576; Referee: Yoo Sun-Ho

8 August 26	Gangwon	1 – 1	Jeju	Gangneung, Gangwon
19:30	Bae Hyo-Sung 68' (Assist by No.22)	Report	Kim Jun-Yeop (yellow card) 40' (yellow-red card) 59'; Jair 90+3' (pen.)	Stadium: Gangneung Stadium; Attendance: 2,511; Referee: Kim Dong-Jin

12 August 27	Incheon	2 – 0	Gangwon	Nam-gu, Incheon
19:00	Nam Joon-Jae 21'; Park Jun-Tae 62'	Report	Kim Tae-Min (yellow card) 14' (yellow-red card) 52'	Stadium: Incheon Football Stadium; Attendance: 2,133; Referee: Lee Min-Hu

18 August 28	Gangwon	1 – 2	Busan	Gangneung, Gangwon
19:00	Wesley 46' (Assist by No.32)	Report	Bang Seung-Hwan 10'; McKay 90+2'	Stadium: Gangneung Stadium; Attendance: 3,166; Referee: Kim Jong-hyeok

22 August 29	Daegu	2 – 0	Gangwon	Suseong-gu, Daegu
19:00	Dinélson 31' (pen.); Lee Jin-Ho 77'	Report		Stadium: Daegu Stadium; Attendance: 3,059; Referee: Kim Sung-Ho

26 August 30	Gangwon	3 – 4	Chunnam	Gangneung, Gangwon
19:00	Zicu 5', 38' (both Free kick); Denis 88' (Assist by No.5)	Report	Flávio 31', 34' (pen.); Kim Young-Uk 41'; Cornthwaite 75'	Stadium: Gangneung Stadium; Attendance: 4,204; Referee: Kim Dong-Jin

16 September 31	Incheon	2 – 1	Gangwon	Nam-gu, Incheon
17:00	Jung In-Hwan 52'; Han Kyo-Won 81'	Report(Korean)	Han Dong-Won 70' (Assist by No.22)	Stadium: Incheon Football Stadium; Attendance: 2,238; Referee: Kim Jong-hyeok

22 September 32	Gangwon	0 – 1	Seongnam	Gangneung, Gangwon
15:00		Report(Korean)	Kim Seong-Jun 13'	Stadium: Gangneung Stadium; Attendance: 1,446; Referee: Kim Sung-Ho

27 September 33	Gangwon	1 – 0	Gwangju	Gangneung, Gangwon
19:00	Kim Eun-Jung 75' (pen.)	Report(Korean)	Jeong Woo-In (yellow card) 13' (yellow-red card) 74'	Stadium: Gangneung Stadium; Attendance: 1,318; Referee: Yoo Seon-Ho

3 October 34	Chunnam	0 – 0	Gangwon	Gwangyang, Jeonnam
15:00		Report(Korean)		Stadium: Gwangyang Football Stadium; Attendance: 2,259; Referee: Hong Jin-Ho

7 October 35	Daejeon	5 – 3	Gangwon	Yuseong-gu, Daejeon
15:00	Terra 8'; Oris 34', 45', 62'; Han Kyung-In 90'	Report(Korean)	Zicu 21'; Zicu 47' (Assist by No.32); Zicu 58'	Stadium: Daejeon World Cup Stadium; Attendance: 3,626; Referee: Ryu Hee-Sun

21 October 36	Gangwon	3 – 0	Daegu	Gangneung, Gangwon
17:00	Zicu 44'; Zicu 60' (Assist by No.19); Oh Jae-Suk 90+3' (Assist by No.83)	Report		Stadium: Gangneung Stadium; Attendance: 1,481; Referee: Choi Myung-Yong

27 October 37	Sangju	0 – 2	Gangwon	Sangju, Gyeongbuk
15:00		w/o		Stadium: Sangju Civic Stadium

4 November 38	Gangwon	5 – 1	Daejeon	Gangneung, Gangwon
15:00	Zicu 30'; Shim Young-Sung 39' (Assist by No.83); Baek Jong-Hwan 47' (Assist by No.11); Wesley 56' (Assist by No.32); Kim Eun-Jung 88' (Assist by No.32)	Report	Oris 41'; Namgung Do (yellow card) 67' (yellow-red card) 79'	Stadium: Gangneung Stadium; Attendance: 1,757; Referee: Lee Min-Hu

11 November 39	Gwangju	1 – 1	Gangwon	Seo-gu, Gwangju
15:00	Lee Seung-Gi 55'	Report	Oh Jae-Seok 62'	Stadium: Gwangju World Cup Stadium; Attendance: 1,584; Referee: Choi Myung-Yong

17 November 40	Daegu	2 – 2	Gangwon	Suseong-gu, Daegu
17:00	Lee Ji-Nam 29'; Song Je-Heon 68'	Report	Zicu 1'; Kim Eun-Jung 85' (Assist by No.83)	Stadium: Daegu Stadium; Attendance: 2,928; Referee: Yoo Seon-Ho

21 November 41	Gangwon	2 – 3	Chunnam	Gangneung, Gangwon
19:00	Wesley 20' (pen.); Kim Eun-Jung 89' (Assist by No.19)	Report	Ko Cha-Won 7'; Yoon Suk-Young 10'; Shim Dong-Woon 86'	Stadium: Gangneung Stadium; Attendance: 1,313; Referee: Lee Min-Hu

24 November 42	Gangwon	2 – 0	Sangju	Gangneung, Gangwon
15:00		w/o		Stadium: Gangneung Stadium

28 November 43	Seongnam	0 – 1	Gangwon	Seongnam, Gyeonggi
19:30		Report	Baek Jong-Hwan 43'	Stadium: Tancheon Sports Complex; Attendance: 1,613; Referee: Choi Myung-Yong

1 December 44	Gangwon	2 – 1	Incheon	Gangneung, Gangwon
15:00	Jung Sung-Min 45'; Kim Myung-Joong 90' (Assist by No.17)	Report	Jung Hyuk 84' (pen.)	Stadium: Gangneung Stadium; Attendance: 1,241; Referee: Kim Jong-hyeok

==== League table ====
Pos	Team	Pld	W	D	L	GF	GA	GD	Pts	Qualification or relegation
12	Seongnam Ilhwa Chunma	44	14	10	20	47	56	−9	52	
13	Daejeon Citizen	44	13	11	20	46	67	−21	50	
14	Gangwon FC	44	14	7	23	57	68	−11	49	
15	Gwangju FC (R)	44	10	15	19	57	67	−10	45	Relegation to the K League Challenge
16	Sangju Sangmu Phoenix (R)	44	7	6	31	29	74	−45	27	Withdrawal (Note: Sangju Sangmu Phoenix were going to be forcibly relegated to the second division by K League Federation regardless of the results after they failed to get a club license from the Asian Football Confederation. They withdrew after the 31st matchweek once their relegation was confirmed.)

Source: K League
Rules for classification: 1) Points; 2) Goal difference; 3) Goals scored.
(R) Relegated

==== Results summary ====
Overall								Home						Away					
Pld	W	D	L	GF	GA	GD	Pts	W	D	L	GF	GA	GD	W	D	L	GF	GA	GD
44	14	7	23	57	68	−11	49	7	2	13	29	35	−6	7	5	10	28	33	−5

==== Results by round ====
Round	1	2	3	4	5	6	7	8	9	10	11	12	13	14	15	16	17	18	19	20	21	22	23	24	25	26	27	28	29	30	31	32	33	34	35	36	37	38	39	40	41	42	43	44
Ground	A	H	A	H	A	H	H	A	A	H	H	A	H	A	H	A	H	H	A	A	H	A	A	H	A	H	A	H	A	H	A	H	H	A	A	H	A	H	A	A	H	H	A	H
Result	D	W	L	L	D	W	L	W	L	L	L	L	L	W	L	L	L	L	W	W	L	L	W	D	L	D	L	L	L	L	L	L	W	D	L	W	W	W	D	D	L	W	W	W
Position	9	6	8	11	12	10	10	8	11	12	13	13	14	12	13	14	15	16	14	12	13	13	12	12	13	13	14	16	16	16	16	16	15	15	15	15	14	14	14	15	15	14	14	14

Updated to match(es) played on 2 December 2012. Source: League Fixtures and Results
A = Away; H = Home; W = Win; D = Draw; L = Loss

=== Korean FA Cup ===
23 May Round of 32	Gangwon FC	1 – 0	Korea University	Gangneung, Gangwon
19:00 KST	Jung Sung-Min 86' (Assist by No.18)			Stadium: Gangneung Stadium; Attendance: 80; Referee: Ju Kyung-Ho

20 June Round of 16	Gyeongnam FC	1 – 0	Gangwon FC	Changwon, Gyeongnam
19:30 KST	Yun Il-Rok 26' (yellow card) 30' (yellow-red card) 66'		Jung Sung-Min (yellow card) 19' (yellow-red card) 36'	Stadium: Changwon Football Center, Changwon; Attendance: 1,486

== Squad statistics ==
=== Appearances ===
Statistics accurate as of match played 1 December 2012

No.	Nat.	Pos.	Name	League		FA Cup		Appearances		Goals
No.	Nat.	Pos.	Name	Apps	Goals	Apps	Goals	App (sub)	Total	Goals
1	(South Korea)	GK	Kim Keun-Bae	16 (1)	0	1	0	17 (1)	18	0
2	(South Korea)	DF	Lee Sang-don	8 (3)	0	1	0	9 (3)	12	0
3	(South Korea)	DF	Lee Min-Kyu	4 (5)	0	1	0	5 (5)	10	0
4	(South Korea)	DF	Oh Jae-Seok	30 (1)	2	2	0	32 (1)	33	2
5	(South Korea)	DF	Bae Hyo-Sung	27	2	0	0	27 (0)	27	2
6	(Bosnia and Herzegovina)	MF	Muhamed Džakmić	21	0	0	0	21 (0)	21	0
7	(South Korea)	MF	Baek Jong-Hwan	32 (4)	2	1 (1)	0	33 (5)	38	2
8	(South Korea)	FW	Han Dong-Won	0 (7)	1	0	0	0 (7)	7	1
9	(South Korea)	FW	Shim Young-Sung	6 (3)	1	0	0	6 (3)	9	1
10	(Japan)	MF	Yusuke Shimada	20 (3)	1	0	0	20 (3)	23	1
11	(South Korea)	FW	Kim Myung-Joong	14 (8)	2	1	0	15 (8)	23	2
12	(South Korea)	DF	Lee Jae-Hoon	9 (1)	0	1	0	10 (1)	11	0
13	(South Korea)	DF	Park Sang-Jin	12 (3)	0	0	0	12 (3)	15	0
14	(South Korea)	DF	Kim Jin-Hwan	16 (3)	0	2	0	18 (3)	21	0
15	(South Korea)	DF	Kim Oh-Gyu	30 (3)	0	1	0	31 (3)	34	0
16	(South Korea)	FW	Kim Jung-Joo	2 (1)	0	0	0	2 (1)	3	0
17	(South Korea)	FW	Jung Sung-Min	16 (9)	5	1 (1)	1	17 (10)	27	6
18	(South Korea)	FW	Kim Eun-Jung	32 (9)	16	0 (2)	0	32 (11)	43	16
19	(Brazil)	FW	Wesley	29 (7)	9	0 (1)	0	29 (8)	37	9
20	(South Korea)	MF	Kim Tae-Min	22 (4)	0	1	0	23 (4)	27	0
21	(South Korea)	GK	Song Yoo-Geol	25	0	0	0	25 (0)	25	0
22	(South Korea)	MF	Denis Laktionov	1 (9)	1	0	0	1 (9)	10	1
23	(South Korea)	DF	Jeon Jae-Ho	13	0	0	0	13 (0)	13	0
24	(South Korea)	MF	Lee Woo-Hyeok	2 (6)	0	0	0	2 (6)	8	0
25	(South Korea)	MF	Oh Won-Jong	0	0	0	0	0	0	0
26	(South Korea)	MF	Jang Seok-Min	0	0	0	0	0	0	0
27	(South Korea)	MF	Chang Hyuk-Jin	9 (6)	1	2	0	11 (6)	17	1
28	(South Korea)	DF	Lee Jun-Hyung	0 (1)	0	1	0	1 (1)	2	0
29	(South Korea)	FW	Kim Dong-Ki	4 (3)	0	0	0	4 (3)	7	0
30	(South Korea)	FW	Ko Min-Ju	0	0	0	0	0	0	0
31	(South Korea)	GK	Yang Han-Bin	1	0	1	0	2 (0)	2	0
32	(South Korea)	MF	Kim Jong-Gook	11 (5)	0	0	0	11 (5)	16	0
33	(South Korea)	DF	Park Woo-Hyun	25 (7)	0	0	0	25 (7)	32	0
34	(South Korea)	DF	Ma Sang-Hoon	0	0	0	0	0	0	0
35	(South Korea)	DF	Lee Bong-Jun	0 (1)	0	1	0	1 (1)	2	0
36	(South Korea)	DF	Na Byung-Hwan	0	0	0	0	0	0	0
38	(South Korea)	DF	Yang Yoon-Hyuk	0	0	0	0	0	0	0
39	(South Korea)	MF	Moon Kyung-Min	0	0	0	0	0	0	0
40	(South Korea)	FW	Park Jae-Bum	0	0	0	0	0	0	0
41	(South Korea)	DF	Ham Min-Seok	0	0	0 (1)	0	0 (1)	1	0
42	(South Korea)	DF	Lee Yoon-Ho	0	0	0	0	0	0	0
43	(South Korea)	DF	Kang Min-Woo	0	0	0	0	0	0	0
77	(South Korea)	DF	Lee Yoon-Eui	2 (2)	0	0	0	2 (2)	4	0
83	(Romania)	FW	Ianis Zicu	16 (1)	9	0	0	16 (1)	17	9
99	(South Korea)	FW	Park Jung-Hoon	1 (2)	1	0	0	1 (2)	3	1
8	(South Korea)	MF	Park Tae-Woong (out)	4 (4)	0	1	0	5 (4)	9	0
9	(Croatia)	MF	Mateas Delić (out)	0	0	0	0	0	0	0
22	(South Korea)	DF	Kim Joon-Beom (loan out)	0 (1)	0	1	0	1 (1)	2	0
23	(South Korea)	MF	Lee Jung-Woon (loan out)	0	0	2	0	2 (0)	2	0
25	(South Korea)	MF	Kim Eun-Hu (out)	0	0	0	0	0	0	0
32	(South Korea)	MF	Noh Yong-Hun (out)	0	0	0	0	0	0	0

=== Goals and assists ===
Rank	Nation	Number	Name	K-League		KFA Cup		Sum		Total
Rank	Nation	Number	Name	Goals	Assists	Goals	Assists	Goals	Assists	Total
1	(South Korea)	18	Kim Eun-Jung	16	2	0	1	16	3	19
2	(Brazil)	19	Wesley	9	4	0	0	9	4	13
=	(Romania)	83	Ianis Zicu	9	4	0	0	9	4	13
3	(South Korea)	17	Jung Sung-Min	5	3	1	0	6	3	9
4	(South Korea)	4	Oh Jae-Seok	2	3	0	0	2	3	5
5	(South Korea)	5	Bae Hyo-Sung	2	2	0	0	2	2	4
=	(South Korea)	32	Kim Jong-Gook	0	4	0	0	0	4	4
6	(South Korea)	11	Kim Myung-Joong	2	1	0	0	2	1	3
=	(Japan)	10	Yusuke Shimada	1	2	0	0	1	2	3
=	(South Korea)	22	Denis Laktionov	1	2	0	0	1	2	3
7	(South Korea)	7	Baek Jong-Hwan	2	0	0	0	2	0	2
=	(South Korea)	27	Chang Hyuk-Jin	1	1	0	0	1	1	2
8	(South Korea)	8	Han Dong-Won	1	0	0	0	1	0	1
=	(South Korea)	9	Shim Young-Sung	1	0	0	0	1	0	1
=	(South Korea)	99	Park Jung-Hoon	1	0	0	0	1	0	1
/	/	/	Awarded Goals	4	-	0	-	4	-	4
/	/	/	Own Goals	0	-	0	-	0	-	0
/	/	/	TOTALS	57	28	1	1	58	29	

=== Discipline ===
Position	Nation	Number	Name	K-League		KFA Cup		Total	
Position	Nation	Number	Name	Yellow card	Red card	Yellow card	Red card	Yellow card	Red card
GK	(South Korea)	1	Kim Keun-Bae	5	0	0	0	5	0
DF	(South Korea)	2	Lee Sang-don	1	0	0	0	1	0
DF	(South Korea)	3	Lee Min-Kyu	2	0	0	0	2	0
DF	(South Korea)	4	Oh Jae-Seok	3	0	0	0	3	0
DF	(South Korea)	5	Bae Hyo-Sung	4	0	0	0	4	0
MF	(Bosnia and Herzegovina)	6	Muhamed Džakmić	3	0	0	0	3	0
MF	(South Korea)	7	Baek Jong-Hwan	7	0	0	0	7	0
MF	(South Korea)	8	Park Tae-Woong	3	1	0	0	3	1
FW	(South Korea)	9	Shim Young-Sung	2	0	0	0	2	0
MF	(Japan)	10	Yusuke Shimada	2	0	0	0	2	0
FW	(South Korea)	11	Kim Myung-Joong	1	0	0	0	1	0
DF	(South Korea)	12	Lee Jae-Hoon	1	0	0	0	1	0
DF	(South Korea)	14	Kim Jin-Hwan	4	0	0	0	4	0
DF	(South Korea)	15	Kim Oh-Gyu	4	0	0	0	4	0
FW	(South Korea)	17	Jung Sung-Min	1	0	2	1	3	1
FW	(South Korea)	18	Kim Eun-Jung	3	0	0	0	3	0
FW	(Brazil)	19	Wesley	9	0	0	0	9	0
MF	(South Korea)	20	Kim Tae-Min	7	1	0	0	7	1
GK	(South Korea)	21	Song Yoo-Geol	2	0	0	0	2	0
MF	(South Korea)	22	Denis Laktionov	1	0	0	0	1	0
DF	(South Korea)	23	Jeon Jae-Ho	5	0	0	0	5	0
MF	(South Korea)	24	Lee Woo-Hyeok	1	0	0	0	1	0
MF	(South Korea)	27	Chang Hyuk-Jin	1	0	0	0	1	0
MF	(South Korea)	32	Kim Jong-Gook	3	0	0	0	3	0
DF	(South Korea)	33	Park Woo-Hyun	4	0	0	0	4	0
FW	(Romania)	83	Ianis Zicu	2	0	0	0	2	0
FW	(South Korea)	99	Park Jung-Hoon	1	0	0	0	1	0
/	/	/	TOTALS	82	2	2	1	84	3
