= 2011 Ulsan Hyundai FC season =

Ulsan Hyundai FC
2011 season
- Chairman: Kwon Oh-Gab
- Manager: Kim Ho-Gon
- K-League: Runners-up
- Korean FA Cup: Semifinal
- League Cup: Winners
- Top goalscorer: League: Kwak Tae-Hwi (9); All: Kim Shin-Wook (18)
- Highest home attendance: 34,758 vs Daejeon (March 6)
- Lowest home attendance: 983 vs Gangwon (April 20)
- Average home league attendance: 12,204
Home colours	Away colours

The 2011 season was Ulsan Hyundai FC's twenty-eighth season in the K-League in South Korea. Ulsan Hyundai FC will be competing in K-League, League Cup and Korean FA Cup.

== Current squad ==
Note: Flags indicate national team as defined under FIFA eligibility rules; some limited exceptions apply. Players may hold more than one non-FIFA nationality.

No.	Pos.	Nation	Player
1	GK	KOR	Kim Young-Kwang
2	DF	KOR	Lee Yong
4	DF	KOR	Kang Min-Soo
5	DF	KOR	Kwak Tae-Hwi (captain)
6	DF	KOR	Choi Jae-Soo
7	MF	KOR	Ko Chang-Hyun
8	MF	KOR	Lee Ho
9	FW	KOR	Kim Shin-Wook
10	FW	KOR	Seol Ki-Hyeon
11	FW	BRA	Lucio
13	MF	KOR	Byun Woong
14	MF	KOR	Kim Young-Sam
15	DF	KOR	Lee Jae-Seong
17	MF	KOR	Go Seul-Ki
18	GK	KOR	Kim Seung-Gyu
19	FW	KOR	Lee Jin-Ho
20	MF	COL	Juan Estiven Vélez
21	FW	KOR	Kim Da-Bin
22	DF	KOR	Choi Bo-Kyung

No.	Pos.	Nation	Player
24	DF	KOR	Lim Chang-Woo
25	MF	KOR	Choi Jin-soo
26	MF	KOR	Kim Jong-Guk
27	DF	KOR	Kang Jin-Wook
31	GK	KOR	Choi Moo-Lim
32	FW	KOR	Park Kyung-Ik
33	MF	KOR	Kim Dong-Suk
34	FW	KOR	Park Seung-Il
35	GK	KOR	Chung Yoo-Suk
36	DF	KOR	Lim Jong-Eun
37	GK	KOR	Lee Hee-Sung
38	MF	KOR	Min Hoon-Gi
40	DF	BRA	Vinicius
41	DF	KOR	Yoon Jung-Min
42	MF	KOR	Yoo Yong-Won
43	FW	KOR	Yang Min-Hyuk
45	GK	KOR	Jeon Hong-Suk
47	FW	KOR	Park Dong-Hyuk
49	MF	KOR	Jun Won-Gu

== Match results ==
=== K-League ===
Date Round	Home	Score	Away	Location

6 March 1	Ulsan Hyundai	1–2	Daejeon Citizen	Nam-gu, Ulsan
15:00 UTC+9	Kim Shin-Wook 70'	Report	Wagner 19', 51'	Stadium: Munsu Cup Stadium; Attendance: 34,758; Referee: Lee Sang-Yong

13 March 2	Gyeongnam	1–0	Ulsan Hyundai	Changwon, Gyeongnam
15:30 UTC+9	Lucio 55'	Report		Stadium: Changwon Football Center; Attendance: 16,749; Referee: Moon Jin-Hee

20 March 3	Ulsan Hyundai	2–1	Gwangju	Nam-gu, Ulsan
15:00 UTC+9	Kwak Tae-Hwi 67' (pen.), 86'	Report	Kim Dong-Sub 35'	Stadium: Munsu Cup Stadium; Attendance: 5,175; Referee: Yoo Seon-Ho

2 April 4	Suwon Samsung Bluewings	2–1	Ulsan Hyundai	Suwon, Gyeonggi
15:00 UTC+9	Oh Jang-Eun 54'; Neretljak 75' (pen.)	Report	Kim Shin-Wook 67'	Stadium: Suwon World Cup Stadium; Attendance: 26,234; Referee: Lee Min-Hu

10 April 5	Ulsan Hyundai	1–0	Gangwon	Nam-gu, Ulsan
15:00 UTC+9	Lee Jae-Seong 90+3'	Report		Stadium: Munsu Cup Stadium; Attendance: 7,349; Referee: Lee Dong-Jun

15 April 6	Seoul	1–1	Ulsan Hyundai	Mapo-gu, Seoul
17:00 UTC+9	Ha Dae-Sung 83'	Report	Kwak Tae-Hwi 64'	Stadium: Seoul World Cup Stadium; Attendance: 28,418; Referee: Lee Sam-Ho

23 April 7	Pohang Steelers	2–0	Ulsan Hyundai	Pohang, Gyeongbuk
15:00 UTC+9	Cho Chan-Ho 78'; Chuva 84'	Report		Stadium: Steelyard Stadium; Attendance: 14,394; Referee: Choi Kwang-Bo

30 April 8	Ulsan Hyundai	2–1	Daegu	Nam-gu, Ulsan
17:00 UTC+9	Lee Jae-Seong (yellow card) 14' (yellow-red card) 16'; Go Seul-Ki 45'; Kim Shin-Wook 52'	Report	Juninho 17' (pen.)	Stadium: Munsu Cup Stadium; Attendance: 5,609; Referee: Lee Min-Hu

7 May 9	Jeonbuk Hyundai Motors	1–0	Ulsan Hyundai	Jeonju, Jeonbuk
17:00 UTC+9	Kim Dong-Chan 51'	Report		Stadium: Jeonju World Cup Stadium; Attendance: 22,723; Referee: Lim Won-Taek

15 May 10	Ulsan Hyundai	0–1	Jeju United	Seosan, Chungnam
17:00 UTC+9		Report	Park Hyun-Beom 59'	Stadium: Seosan City Stadium; Attendance: 21,755; Referee: Ko Keum-Bok

22 May 11	Ulsan Hyundai	3–2	Seongnam Ilhwa Chunma	Nam-gu, Ulsan
17:00 UTC+9	Kim Shin-Wook 13'; Seol Ki-Hyeon 32' (pen.); Kwak Tae-Hwi 80'	Report	Cho Dong-Geon 26', 45+1'	Stadium: Munsu Cup Stadium; Attendance: 8,576; Referee: Lee Sang-Yong

28 May 12	Chunnam Dragons	0–1	Ulsan Hyundai	Gwangyang, Jeonnam
19:00 UTC+9		Report	Kang Min-Soo 13'	Stadium: Gwangyang Stadium; Attendance: 7,828; Referee: Choi Kwang-Bo

11 June 13	Sangju Sangmu Phoenix	1–2	Ulsan Hyundai	Sangju, Gyeongbuk
19:00 UTC+9	Kim Jung-Woo 11'	Report	Go Seul-Ki 13'; Lee Jae-Seong 87'	Stadium: Sangju Stadium; Attendance: 10,573; Referee: Ryu Hee-Seon

18 June 14	Ulsan Hyundai	1–1	Incheon United	Nam-gu, Ulsan
19:00 UTC+9	Ko Chang-Hyun 44'	Report	Luizinho 32'	Stadium: Munsu Cup Stadium; Attendance: 23,897; Referee: Woo Sang-Il

25 June 15	Busan I'Park	2–0	Ulsan Hyundai	Yeonje-gu, Busan
19:00 UTC+9	Lim Sang-Hyub 52'; Yang Dong-Hyun 60'	Report		Stadium: Busan Asiad Stadium; Attendance: 2,336; Referee: Kim Jong-Hyuk

3 July 16	Ulsan Hyundai	0–0	Gyeongnam	Nam-gu, Ulsan
19:00 UTC+9		Report		Stadium: Munsu Cup Stadium; Attendance: 3,376; Referee: Lee Dong-Jun

10 July 17	Ulsan Hyundai	0–0	Jeonbuk Hyundai Motors	Nam-gu, Ulsan
19:00 UTC+9		Report		Stadium: Munsu Cup Stadium; Attendance: 10,572; Referee: Lee Jong-Guk

16 July 18	Gangwon	1–2	Ulsan Hyundai	Gangneung, Gangwon
19:00 UTC+9	Lee Jung-Woon 38'	Report	Kim Shin-Wook 53'; Lee Jin-Ho 78'	Stadium: Gangneung Stadium; Attendance: 4,020; Referee: Ko Keum-Bok

23 July 19	Ulsan Hyundai	2–0	Chunnam Dragons	Nam-gu, Ulsan
19:00 UTC+9	Kim Shin-Wook 39'; Seol Ki-Hyeon 58'	Report		Stadium: Munsu Cup Stadium; Attendance: 32,157; Referee: Woo Sang-Il

6 August 20	Ulsan Hyundai	1–2	Seoul	Nam-gu, Ulsan
19:00 UTC+9	Kang Min-Soo 77'	Report	Choi Hyun-Tae 7'; Ko Myong-Jin 75'	Stadium: Munsu Cup Stadium; Attendance: 12,107; Referee: Lee Sam-Ho

14 August 21	Seongnam Ilhwa Chunma	3–2	Ulsan Hyundai	Seongnam, Gyeonggi
19:00 UTC+9	Jeon Sung-Chan 17'; Éverton Santos 20'; Héverton 77'	Report	Go Seul-Ki 58', 86'	Stadium: Tancheon Sports Complex; Attendance: 5,026; Referee: Kim Sung-Ho

20 August 22	Daejeon Citizen	1–0	Ulsan Hyundai	Yuseong-gu, Daejeon
19:00 UTC+9	Wagner 8'	Report		Stadium: Daejeon World Cup Stadium; Attendance: 9,230; Referee: Hong Jin-Ho

27 August 23	Ulsan Hyundai	1–1	Suwon Samsung Bluewings	Nam-gu, Ulsan
19:00 UTC+9	Lee Jin-Ho 34'	Report	Oh Jang-Eun 78'	Stadium: Munsu Cup Stadium; Attendance: 21,753; Referee: Choi Kwang-Bo

10 September 24	Jeju United	1–2	Ulsan Hyundai	Seogwipo, Jeju
15:00 UTC+9	Santos 44'	Report	Kwak Tae-Hwi 30', 71'	Stadium: Jeju World Cup Stadium; Attendance: 2,523; Referee: Choi Myung-Yong

17 September 25	Ulsan Hyundai	3–1	Sangju Sangmu Phoenix	Nam-gu, Ulsan
17:00 UTC+9	Lee Jin-Ho 29'; Kwak Tae-Hwi 70'; Park Seung-Il 78'	Report	Lee Sung-Jae 56'	Stadium: Munsu Cup Stadium; Attendance: 6,573; Referee: Hong Jin-Ho

24 September 26	Incheon United	0–2	Ulsan Hyundai	Seo-gu, Incheon
19:00 UTC+9		Report	Seol Ki-Hyeon 69'; Park Seung-Il 81'	Stadium: Incheon Munhak Stadium; Attendance: 5,141; Referee: Ko Keum-Bok

2 October 27	Gwangju	0–0	Ulsan Hyundai	Seo-gu, Gwangju
15:00 UTC+9		Report		Stadium: Gwangju World Cup Stadium; Attendance: 3,436; Referee: Ryu Hee-Sun

16 October 28	Ulsan Hyundai	2–1	Pohang Steelers	Nam-gu, Ulsan
17:00 UTC+9	Go Seul-Ki 21'; Ko Chang-Hyun 90+2'	Report	Asamoah 82'	Stadium: Munsu Cup Stadium; Attendance: 23,875; Referee: Choi Kwang-Bo

22 October 29	Ulsan Hyundai	1–0	Busan I'Park	Nam-gu, Ulsan
17:00 UTC+9	Go Seul-Ki 70'	Report		Stadium: Munsu Cup Stadium; Attendance: 11,257; Referee: Lee Sang-Yong

30 October 30	Daegu	0–0	Ulsan Hyundai	Suseong-gu, Daegu
15:00 UTC+9		Report		Stadium: Daegu Stadium; Attendance: 5,814; Referee: Hong Jin-Ho

==== League table ====
Pos	Team	Pld	W	D	L	GF	GA	GD	Pts	Qualification
4	Suwon Samsung Bluewings	30	17	4	9	51	33	+18	55	Qualification for the K League playoffs first round
5	Busan IPark	30	13	7	10	49	43	+6	46	Qualification for the K League playoffs first round
6	Ulsan Hyundai	30	13	7	10	33	29	+4	46	Qualification for the K League playoffs first round
7	Jeonnam Dragons	30	11	10	9	33	29	+4	43	
8	Gyeongnam FC	30	12	6	12	41	40	+1	42	

Source: K League
Rules for classification: 1) Points; 2) Goal difference; 3) Goals scored

Pos	Team	Qualification
1	Jeonbuk Hyundai Motors (C)	Qualification for the Champions League group stage
2	Ulsan Hyundai	Qualification for the Champions League group stage
3	Pohang Steelers	Qualification for the Champions League playoff round
4	Suwon Samsung Bluewings	
5	FC Seoul	
6	Busan IPark	

Source: RSSSF
(C) Champions

==== Results summary ====
Overall								Home						Away					
Pld	W	D	L	GF	GA	GD	Pts	W	D	L	GF	GA	GD	W	D	L	GF	GA	GD
30	13	7	10	33	29	+4	46	8	4	3	20	13	+7	5	3	7	13	16	−3

==== Results by round ====
Round	1	2	3	4	5	6	7	8	9	10	11	12	13	14	15	16	17	18	19	20	21	22	23	24	25	26	27	28	29	30
Ground	H	A	H	A	H	A	A	H	A	H	H	A	A	H	A	H	H	A	H	A	A	A	H	A	H	A	A	H	H	A
Result	L	L	W	L	W	D	L	W	L	L	W	W	W	D	L	D	D	W	W	L	L	L	D	W	W	W	D	W	W	D
Position	11	15	11	13	10	10	11	10	13	14	13	9	7	7	11	11	12	9	8	9	9	9	10	9	8	7	7	6	5	6

Updated to match(es) played on 30 October 2011. Source: League Fixtures and Results
A = Away; H = Home; W = Win; D = Draw; L = Loss

=== K-League Championship ===
19 November First Round	FC Seoul	1–3	Ulsan Hyundai	Mapo-gu, Seoul
15:00 UTC+9	Dejan 58'	Report	Kwak Tae-Hwi 17'; Kim Shin-Wook 33'; Go Seul-Ki 59'	Stadium: Seoul World Cup Stadium; Attendance: 30,799; Referee: Lee Sam-Ho

23 November Second Round	Suwon Samsung Bluewings	1–1 (a.e.t.) (1–3 p)	Ulsan Hyundai	Suwon, Gyeonggi
19:30 UTC+9	Mato 83' (pen.)	Report	Kim Shin-Wook 21'	Stadium: Suwon World Cup Stadium; Attendance: 15,862; Referee: Choi Kwang-Bo
	Penalties
	Mato (penalty scored); Yeom Ki-Hun (penalty missed); Yang Sang-Min (penalty missed); Choi Sung-Hwan (penalty missed)		(penalty missed) Seol Ki-Hyeon; (penalty scored) Lucio; (penalty scored) Kim Shin-Wook; (penalty scored) Go Seul-Ki

26 November Semifinal	Pohang Steelers	0–1	Ulsan Hyundai	Pohang, Gyeongbuk
15:00 UTC+9		Report	Seol Ki-Hyeon 72' (pen.)	Stadium: Steelyard Stadium; Attendance: 21,317; Referee: Ko Keum-Bok

30 November Final 1st leg	Ulsan Hyundai	1–2	Jeonbuk Hyundai Motors	Nam-gu, Ulsan
18:10 UTC+9	Kwak Tae-Hwi 63'	Report	Eninho 52' (pen.), 79'	Stadium: Ulsan Munsu Football Stadium; Attendance: 25,375; Referee: Lee Sam-Ho

4 December Final 2nd leg	Jeonbuk Hyundai Motors	2–1	Ulsan Hyundai	Jeonju, Jeonbuk
13:30 UTC+9	Eninho 59' (pen.); Luiz 68'	Report	Seol Ki-Hyeon 56'	Stadium: Jeonju World Cup Stadium; Attendance: 33,554; Referee: Choi Kwang-Bo

=== Korean FA Cup ===
18 May Round of 32	Ansan Hallelujah	0–1	Ulsan Hyundai	Ansan, Gyeonggi
19:00 UTC+9			Shin Jae-Pil 65' (o.g.)	Stadium: Ansan Wa~ Stadium; Attendance: 350; Referee: Ko Hyung-Jin

15 June Round of 16	Ulsan Hyundai	2–1 (a.e.t.)	Sangju Sangmu Phoenix	Nam-gu, Ulsan
19:00 UTC+9	Lee Ho 31'; Go Seul-Ki 113'		Kim Jung-Woo 24'	Stadium: Munsu Cup Stadium; Attendance: 1,385; Referee: Lee Dong-Jun

27 July Quarterfinal	Ulsan Hyundai	3–0	Gangwon	Nam-gu, Ulsan
19:00 UTC+9	Go Seul-Ki 7', 30', 50'			Stadium: Munsu Cup Stadium; Attendance: 1,327; Referee: Mae Ho-Young

24 August Semifinal	Suwon Samsung Bluewings	3–2 (a.e.t.)	Ulsan Hyundai	Suwon, Gyeonggi
19:30 UTC+9	Ristić 76'; Neretljak 82'; Park Hyun-Beom 111'		Seol Ki-Hyeon 58', 74'; Go Seul-Ki (yellow card) 65' (yellow-red card) 68'	Stadium: Suwon World Cup Stadium; Attendance: 14,698; Referee: Kim Dong-Jin

=== League Cup ===
16 March Group round	Ulsan Hyundai	2–1	Busan I'Park	Nam-gu, Ulsan
19:00 UTC+9	Kim Shin-Wook 19', 46'	Report	Kang Min-Soo 63' (o.g.)	Stadium: Munsu Cup Stadium; Attendance: 4,856; Referee: Ahn Yong-Hee

6 April Group round	Ulsan Hyundai	2–1	Sangju Sangmu Phoenix	Nam-gu, Ulsan
19:00 UTC+9	Lee Jin-Ho 11', 53'	Report	Kim Jung-Woo 82'	Stadium: Munsu Cup Stadium; Attendance: 3,323; Referee: Kim Dong-Jin

20 April Group round	Ulsan Hyundai	2–1	Gangwon	Nam-gu, Ulsan
19:00 UTC+9	Kim Shin-Wook 25'; Seol Ki-Hyeon 35' (pen.)	Report	Seo Dong-Hyun 84'	Stadium: Munsu Cup Stadium; Attendance: 983; Referee: Ryu Hee-Seon

4 May Group round	Chunnam Dragons	1–0	Ulsan Hyundai	Gwangyang, Jeonnam
19:00 UTC+9	Cornthwaite 51'	Report		Stadium: Gwangyang Stadium; Attendance: 4,243; Referee: Woo Sang-Il

11 May Group round	Gwangju	1–2	Ulsan Hyundai	Seo-gu, Gwangju
15:00 UTC+9	Yoo Jong-Hyun 13'	Report	Kim Shin-Wook 8', 38'	Stadium: Gwangju World Cup Stadium; Attendance: 568; Referee: Ahn Yong-Hee

29 June Quarterfinal	Ulsan Hyundai	4–1	Jeonbuk Hyundai Motors	Nam-gu, Ulsan
19:00 UTC+9	Kim Shin-Wook 26', 30'; Choi Jae-Soo 41'; Jung Dae-Sun 53'	Report	Park Jung-Hoon 20'	Stadium: Munsu Cup Stadium; Attendance: 2,153; Referee: Ryu Hee-Sun

6 July Semifinal	Ulsan Hyundai	4–2	Gyeongnam	Nam-gu, Ulsan
19:00 UTC+9	Kim Shin-Wook 47', 66', 78', 87'	Report	Lee Hyo-Kyun 15'; Lee Dong-Geun 80'; Seo Sang-Min (red card) 90'	Stadium: Munsu Cup Stadium; Attendance: 2,589; Referee: Ko Keum-Bok

13 July Final	Ulsan Hyundai	3–2	Busan I'Park	Nam-gu, Ulsan
19:00 UTC+9	Ko Chang-Hyun 38'; Seol Ki-Hyeon 45+1'; Kang Jin-Wook 58'	Report	Yang Dong-Hyun 71', 77'	Stadium: Munsu Cup Stadium; Attendance: 21,853; Referee: Lee Min-Hu

== Squad statistics ==
=== Appearances and goals ===
Statistics accurate as of match played 4 December 2011
Numbers in parentheses denote appearances as substitute.

No.	Nat.	Pos.	Name	League		FA Cup		League Cup		Total	
No.	Nat.	Pos.	Name	Apps	Goals	Apps	Goals	Apps	Goals	Apps	Goals
1	KOR	GK	Kim Young-Kwang	28	0	4	0	6	0	38 (0)	0
2	KOR	DF	Lee Yong	16 (6)	0	3 (1)	0	5 (1)	0	24 (8)	0
4	KOR	DF	Kang Min-Soo	18 (7)	2	3 (1)	0	6 (1)	0	27 (9)	2
5	KOR	DF	Kwak Tae-Hwi	34	9	4	0	7	0	45 (0)	9
6	KOR	DF	Choi Jae-Soo	31 (3)	0	4	0	6	1	41 (3)	1
7	KOR	MF	Ko Chang-Hyun	20 (6)	2	2 (1)	0	6	1	28 (7)	3
8	KOR	MF	Lee Ho	29 (4)	0	3	1	7	0	39 (4)	1
9	KOR	FW	Kim Shin-Wook	25 (10)	8	4	0	5 (3)	11	34 (13)	19
10	KOR	FW	Seol Ki-Hyeon	34	5	3 (1)	2	6 (1)	2	43 (2)	9
11	BRA	FW	Lucio	10 (5)	0	0 (1)	0	0	0	10 (6)	0
13	KOR	MF	Byun Woong	0	0	0	0	0	0	0	0
14	KOR	MF	Kim Young-Sam	3	0	0	0	0	0	3 (0)	0
15	KOR	DF	Lee Jae-Seong	22 (1)	2	2	0	3 (1)	0	27 (2)	2
17	KOR	MF	Go Seul-Ki	28 (1)	7	4	4	5 (3)	0	37 (4)	11
18	KOR	GK	Kim Seung-Gyu	1 (1)	0	0	0	0	0	1 (1)	0
19	KOR	FW	Lee Jin-Ho	6 (14)	3	1 (3)	0	4 (2)	2	11 (19)	5
20	COL	MF	Juan Estiven Vélez	27 (3)	0	2	0	4 (1)	0	33 (4)	0
21	KOR	FW	Kim Da-Bin	0	0	0	0	0	0	0	0
22	KOR	DF	Choi Bo-Kyung	0	0	0	0	0	0	0	0
24	KOR	DF	Lim Chang-Woo	0	0	0	0	0	0	0	0
25	KOR	MF	Choi Jin-soo	1	0	0	0	0 (1)	0	1 (1)	0
26	KOR	MF	Kim Jong-Guk	0 (2)	0	0	0	1	0	1 (2)	0
27	KOR	DF	Kang Jin-Wook	11 (3)	0	2	0	3	1	16 (3)	1
31	KOR	GK	Choi Moo-Lim	1	0	0	0	0	0	1 (0)	0
32	KOR	FW	Park Kyung-Ik	0	0	0	0	0	0	0	0
33	KOR	MF	Kim Dong-Suk	3 (5)	0	1	0	2	0	6 (5)	0
34	KOR	FW	Park Seung-Il	11 (8)	2	0 (1)	0	0 (2)	0	11 (11)	2
35	KOR	GK	Chung Yoo-Suk	5	0	0	0	2	0	7 (0)	0
36	KOR	DF	Lim Jong-Eun	0	0	0	0	0	0	0	0
37	KOR	GK	Lee Hee-Sung	0	0	0	0	0	0	0	0
38	KOR	MF	Min Hoon-Gi	0	0	0	0	0	0	0	0
40	BRA	DF	Vinicius	0 (1)	0	0 (1)	0	0	0	0 (2)	0
41	KOR	DF	Yoon Jung-Min	0	0	0	0	0	0	0	0
42	KOR	MF	Yoo Yong-Won	0	0	0	0	0	0	0	0
43	KOR	FW	Yang Min-Hyuk	0	0	0	0	0	0	0	0
45	KOR	GK	Jeon Hong-Suk	0	0	0	0	0	0	0	0
47	KOR	FW	Park Dong-Hyuk	0	0	0	0	0	0	0	0
49	KOR	MF	Jun Won-Gu	0	0	0	0	0	0	0	0
3	KOR	DF	Park Byung-Gyu (out)	3 (3)	0	1 (1)	0	2 (2)	0	6 (6)	0
11	KSA	FW	Naji Majrashi (out)	0 (7)	0	0 (1)	0	0 (2)	0	0 (10)	0
13	BRA	FW	Magnum (out)	4	0	1	0	1	0	6 (0)	0
14	KOR	DF	Song Chong-Gug (out)	13	0	0 (1)	0	4 (1)	0	17 (2)	0
16	KOR	FW	Moon Dae-Seong (out)	1 (1)	0	0	0	0	0	1 (1)	0
23	KOR	FW	Jung Dae-Sun (out)	1 (6)	0	0 (1)	0	3	1	4 (7)	1
28	KOR	MF	Choi Dong-Il (out)	0	0	0	0	0	0	0	0
29	KOR	MF	Shin Hyo-Sup (out)	0	0	0	0	0	0	0	0
30	KOR	MF	Kim Hyo-Gi (out)	0	0	0	0	0	0	0	0
30	KOR	FW	Lee Gi-Dong (out)	0	0	0	0	0	0	0	0
39	KOR	DF	Kwon Oh-Sung (out)	0	0	0	0	0	0	0	0
44	KOR	DF	Lee Dong-Won (out)	0	0	0	0	0	0	0	0
46	KOR	DF	Lee Kyung-Sik (out)	0	0	0	0	0	0	0	0
48	KOR	MF	Byun Sung-Won (out)	0	0	0	0	0	0	0	0
–	KOR	DF	Oh Chang-Sik (out)	0	0	0	0	0	0	0	0
–	KOR	DF	Kim Min-O (out)	0	0	0	0	0	0	0	0

=== Top scorers ===
Rank	Nation	Number	Name	K-League	KFA Cup	League Cup	Total
1	(South Korea)	9	Kim Shin-Wook	8	0	11	19
2	(South Korea)	17	Go Seul-Ki	7	4	0	11
3	(South Korea)	5	Kwak Tae-Hwi	9	0	0	9
=	(South Korea)	10	Seol Ki-Hyeon	5	2	2	9
4	(South Korea)	19	Lee Jin-Ho	3	0	2	5
5	(South Korea)	7	Ko Chang-Hyun	2	0	1	3
6	(South Korea)	4	Kang Min-Soo	2	0	0	2
=	(South Korea)	15	Lee Jae-Seong	2	0	0	2
=	(South Korea)	34	Park Seung-Il	2	0	0	2
7	(South Korea)	8	Lee Ho	0	1	0	1
=	(South Korea)	6	Choi Jae-Soo	0	0	1	1
=	(South Korea)	23	Jung Dae-Sun	0	0	1	1
=	(South Korea)	27	Kang Jin-Wook	0	0	1	1
/	/	/	Own Goals	0	1	0	1
/	/	/	TOTALS	40	8	19	67

=== Top assistors ===
Rank	Nation	Number	Name	K-League	KFA Cup	League Cup	Total
1	(South Korea)	6	Choi Jae-Soo	7	0	4	11
2	(South Korea)	10	Seol Ki-Hyeon	7	0	3	10
3	(South Korea)	7	Ko Chang-Hyun	2	2	3	7
4	(South Korea)	9	Kim Shin-Wook	3	1	1	5
5	(South Korea)	27	Kang Jin-Wook	3	0	0	3
=	(South Korea)	8	Lee Ho	0	0	3	3
6	(South Korea)	5	Kwak Tae-Hwi	2	0	0	2
=	(Brazil)	11	Lucio	2	0	0	2
=	(South Korea)	17	Go Seul-Ki	2	0	0	2
7	(Saudi Arabia)	11	Naji Majrashi	1	0	0	1
=	(South Korea)	15	Lee Jae-Seong	1	0	0	1
=	(South Korea)	34	Park Seung-Il	1	0	0	1
=	(South Korea)	23	Jung Dae-Sun	0	1	0	1
=	(South Korea)	2	Lee Yong	0	0	1	1
/	/	/	TOTALS	31	4	15	50

=== Discipline ===
Position	Nation	Number	Name	K-League		KFA Cup		League Cup		Total	
Position	Nation	Number	Name	Booked	Sent off (straight red)	Booked	Sent off (straight red)	Booked	Sent off (straight red)	Booked	Sent off (straight red)
GK	(South Korea)	1	Kim Young-Kwang	5	0	0	0	0	0	5	0
DF	(South Korea)	2	Lee Yong	1	0	0	0	0	0	1	0
DF	(South Korea)	4	Kang Min-Soo	5	0	0	0	0	0	5	0
DF	(South Korea)	5	Kwak Tae-Hwi	3	0	0	0	0	0	3	0
DF	(South Korea)	6	Choi Jae-Soo	4	0	0	0	1	0	5	0
MF	(South Korea)	7	Ko Chang-Hyun	3	0	1	0	2	0	6	0
MF	(South Korea)	8	Lee Ho	5	0	0	0	0	0	5	0
FW	(South Korea)	9	Kim Shin-Wook	1	0	0	0	0	0	1	0
FW	(South Korea)	10	Seol Ki-Hyeon	6	0	0	0	2	0	8	0
FW	(Saudi Arabia)	11	Naji Majrashi	1	0	0	0	0	0	1	0
FW	(Brazil)	11	Lucio	1	0	0	0	0	0	1	0
DF	(South Korea)	14	Song Chong-Gug	4	0	0	0	0	0	4	0
MF	(South Korea)	14	Kim Young-Sam	2	0	0	0	0	0	2	0
DF	(South Korea)	15	Lee Jae-Seong	5	1	0	0	0	0	5	1
MF	(South Korea)	17	Go Seul-Ki	6	0	2	1	1	0	9	1
FW	(South Korea)	19	Lee Jin-Ho	3	0	0	0	0	0	3	0
MF	(Colombia)	20	Juan Estiven Vélez	4	0	0	0	1	0	5	0
FW	(South Korea)	23	Jung Dae-Sun	1	0	0	0	0	0	1	0
DF	(South Korea)	27	Kang Jin-Wook	0	0	0	0	2	0	2	0
MF	(South Korea)	33	Kim Dong-Suk	1	0	0	0	0	0	1	0
GK	(South Korea)	35	Chung Yoo-Suk	0	0	0	0	1	0	1	0
/	/	/	TOTALS	61	1	3	1	10	0	74	2

== Transfer ==
=== In ===
- 5 July 2011 – (Brazil) Vinicius – Primeira Camisa
- 21 July 2011 – (Brazil) Lúcio – Gyeongnam FC
- 28 July 2011 – (South Korea) Lee Gi-Dong – Pohang Steelers
- 21 September 2011 – (South Korea) Oh Chang-Sik – Sangju Sangmu Phoenix (military service end)
- 21 September 2011 – (South Korea) Kim Young-Sam – Sangju Sangmu Phoenix (military service end)
- 21 September 2011 – (South Korea) Kim Min-O – Sangju Sangmu Phoenix (military service end)
- 21 September 2011 – (South Korea) Byun Woong – Sangju Sangmu Phoenix (military service end)

=== Out ===
- 5 July 2011 – (South Korea) Song Chong-Gug – Tianjin Teda F.C.
- 14 July 2011 – (South Korea) Lee Dong-Won – Busan I'Park
- 21 July 2011 – (South Korea) Jung Dae-Sun – Gyeongnam FC
- 21 July 2011 – (Saudi Arabia) Naji Majrashi – Al-Shabab (loan return)
- 25 July 2011 – (Brazil) Magnum – Free Agent
- July 2011 – (South Korea) Kim Hyo-Gi – Ulsan Hyundai Mipo Dockyard (6 month loan)
- July 2011 – (South Korea) Choi Dong-Il – Free Agent
- July 2011 – (South Korea) Shin Hyo-Sup – Free Agent
- July 2011 – (South Korea) Kwon Oh-Sung – Free Agent
- July 2011 – (South Korea) Lee Kyung-Sik – Free Agent
- July 2011 – (South Korea) Byun Sung-Won – Free Agent
- July 2011 – (South Korea) Park Byung-Gyu – Released (contract terminated)
- 12 August 2011 – (South Korea) Moon Dae-Seong – Dropped out of the club
- 30 September 2011 – (South Korea) Lee Gi-Dong – Free Agent
- 30 September 2011 – (South Korea) Oh Chang-Sik – Free Agent
- 30 September 2011 – (South Korea) Kim Min-O – Free Agent
