= 2011 Gangwon FC season =

Football season

Gangwon FC
2011 season
- Chairman: Gangwon provincial governor
- Manager: Choi Soon-Ho (until April 6, 2011); Kim Sang-ho (since April 7, 2011)
- K-League: 16th
- Korean FA Cup: Quarterfinal
- League Cup: Group round
- Top goalscorer: League: Kim Young-Hoo (4); All: Kim Young-Hoo (6)
- Highest home attendance: 15,497 vs Gyeongnam (March 5)
- Lowest home attendance: 2,017 vs Jeonbuk (August 6)
- Average home league attendance: 5,899
Home colours	Away colours

The 2011 season was Gangwon FC's third season in the K League in South Korea. Gangwon FC will be competing in K League, League Cup and Korean FA Cup.

== Current squad ==
Note: Flags indicate national team as defined under FIFA eligibility rules; some limited exceptions apply. Players may hold more than one non-FIFA nationality.

No.	Pos.	Nation	Player
1	GK	KOR	Kim Keun-Bae
2	DF	KOR	Lee Sang-don
3	DF	KOR	Park Sang-Jin
4	DF	KOR	Kwak Kwang-Seon
5	DF	KOR	Park Woo-Hyun
6	MF	BIH	Muhamed Džakmić
8	MF	KOR	Baek Jong-Hwan
9	MF	CRO	Mateas Delić
10	FW	KOR	Kim Young-Hoo
12	DF	KOR	Oh Jae-Seok (on loan from Suwon Bluewings)
13	FW	KOR	Yoon Jun-Ha
14	MF	KOR	Kwon Soon-Hyung
15	DF	KOR	Kim Oh-Gyu
16	FW	KOR	Chung Kyung-Ho (captain)
17	MF	KOR	Lee Jung-Woon
18	FW	KOR	Kim Jin-Yong
20	MF	KOR	Ha Jung-Heon
22	DF	KOR	Lee Min-Kyu
23	FW	KOR	Jung Sung-Min
24	DF	KOR	Kim Jin-Hwan
25	MF	KOR	Nam Gwang-Hyun
26	MF	KOR	Park Tae-Woong

No.	Pos.	Nation	Player
27	FW	KOR	Seo Dong-Hyun
28	DF	KOR	Lee Jun-Hyung
29	FW	KOR	Yang Jung-Min
30	MF	KOR	Moon Kyung-Joo
31	GK	KOR	Yang Han-Bin
32	DF	KOR	Park Jong-In
33	DF	KOR	Lee Kyung-Soo
34	DF	KOR	Ma Sang-Hoon
35	FW	KOR	Heo Min-Hyuk
36	MF	KOR	Jang Seok-Min
37	FW	KOR	Kim Seok
38	MF	KOR	Lee Hun
39	FW	KOR	Kim Jung-Joo
40	MF	KOR	Kim Woo-Kyung
41	GK	KOR	Kim Se-Jun
42	MF	KOR	Lee Shin-Kyu
43	DF	KOR	Kim Moon-Soo
44	MF	KOR	Lee Woo-Hyeok
45	FW	KOR	Lee Joong-Gwan
46	MF	KOR	Kim Eun-Hu
51	GK	KOR	Yoo Hyun

=== Out on loan ===
Note: Flags indicate national team as defined under FIFA eligibility rules; some limited exceptions apply. Players may hold more than one non-FIFA nationality.

No.	Pos.	Nation	Player
—	FW	KOR	Oh Won-Jong (to Sangju Sangmu Phoenix)
—	DF	KOR	Lee Yoon-Eui (to Sangju Sangmu Phoenix)
—	DF	KOR	Kang Min-Woo (to Sangju Sangmu Phoenix)
—	MF	KOR	Ahn Sung-Nam (to Gwangju FC)
—	MF	KOR	Chang Hyuk-Jin (to Gangneung City FC)

== Match results ==
=== K-League ===
Date Round	Home	Score	Away	Location

5 March 1	Gangwon	0–1	Gyeongnam	Gangneung, Gangwon
15:00 UTC+9		Report	Yoon Bit-Garam 44'	Stadium: Gangneung Stadium; Attendance: 15,497; Referee: Lee Min-Hoo

13 March 2	Daegu	1–0	Gangwon	Buk-gu, Daegu
15:00 UTC+9	Song Je-Heon 18'	Report		Stadium: Daegu Civil Stadium; Attendance: 13,427; Referee: Woo Sang-Il

20 March 3	Jeju United	1–0	Gangwon	Seogwipo, Jeju
15:00 UTC+9	Baek Jong-Hwan 67' (o.g.)	Report		Stadium: Jeju World Cup Stadium; Attendance: 3,152; Referee: Ko Keum-Bok

3 April 4	Gangwon	0–3	Daejeon Citizen	Gangneung, Gangwon
15:00 UTC+9		Report	Kim Seong-Jun 78'; Park Sung-Ho 84', 90+5'	Stadium: Gangneung Stadium; Attendance: 12,317; Referee: Moon Jin-Hee

10 April 5	Ulsan Hyundai	1–0	Gangwon	Nam-gu, Ulsan
15:00 UTC+9	Lee Jae-Seong 90+3'	Report		Stadium: Munsu Cup Stadium; Attendance: 7,349; Referee: Lee Dong-Joon

15 April 6	Suwon Samsung Bluewings	2–0	Gangwon	Suwon, Gyeonggi
19:30 UTC+9	Mato 43'; Choi Sung-Kuk 56'; Ha Tae-Gyun (red card) 85'	Report		Stadium: Suwon World Cup Stadium; Attendance: 19,121; Referee: Yoo Seon-Ho

23 April 7	Gangwon	1–3	Incheon United	Chuncheon, Gangwon
15:00 UTC+9	Kim Young-Hoo 42'	Report	Kim Jae-Woong 60'; Yoo Byung-Soo 62'; Park Jun-Tae 76'	Stadium: Chuncheon Stadium; Attendance: 3,511; Referee: Lee Min-Hoo

30 April 8	Pohang Steelers	0–0	Gangwon	Pohang, Gyeongbuk
15:00 UTC+9		Report		Stadium: Steelyard Stadium; Attendance: 10,466; Referee: Kim Sung-Ho

8 May 9	Gangwon	1–1	Seongnam Ilhwa Chunma	Chuncheon, Gangwon
15:00 UTC+9	Kim Young-Hoo 19'	Report	Hong Cheol 22'	Stadium: Chuncheon Stadium; Attendance: 3,177; Referee: Moon Jin-Hee

14 May 10	Gangwon	0–1	Gwangju FC	Gangneung, Gangwon
19:00 UTC+9		Report	Kim Dong-Sub 22'	Stadium: Gangneung Stadium; Attendance: 5,733; Referee: Lee Sam-Ho

21 May 11	Jeonbuk Hyundai Motors	1–0	Gangwon	Jeonju, Jeonbuk
17:00 UTC+9	Lovrek 24'	Report		Stadium: Jeonju World Cup Stadium; Attendance: 8,720; Referee: Woo Sang-Il

28 May 12	Sangju Sangmu Phoenix	0–0	Gangwon	Sangju, Gyeongbuk
19:00 UTC+9		Report		Stadium: Sangju Stadium; Attendance: 11,324; Referee: Ko Keum-Bok

11 June 13	Gangwon	1–0	Busan I'Park	Gangneung, Gangwon
19:00 UTC+9	Lee Jung-Ho 41' (o.g.)	Report	Kim Eung-Jin (yellow card) 74' (yellow-red card) 90'	Stadium: Gangneung Stadium; Attendance: 5,373; Referee: Kim Sung-Ho

18 June 14	Gangwon	0–2	Seoul	Gangneung, Gangwon
19:00 UTC+9		Report	Ha Dae-Sung 23'; Molina 45'	Stadium: Gangneung Stadium; Attendance: 11,347; Referee: Lim Won-Taek

26 June 15	Chunnam Dragons	1–0	Gangwon	Gwangyang, Jeonnam
19:00 UTC+9	Kim Myung-Joong 23'	Report		Stadium: Gwangyang Stadium; Attendance: 2,924; Referee: Choi Myung-Yong

2 July 16	Gangwon	2–4	Jeju United	Chuncheon, Gangwon
19:00 UTC+9	Lee Eul-Yong 36'; Kim Young-Hoo 41'	Report	Kim Eun-Jung 4', 80'; Lee Hyun-Ho 27'; Santos 86'	Stadium: Chuncheon Stadium; Attendance: 3,207; Referee: Lee Sam-Ho

9 July 17	Gwangju	2–0	Gangwon	Seo-gu, Gwangju
19:00 UTC+9	Lee Seung-Ki 28', 59'	Report		Stadium: Gwangju World Cup Stadium; Attendance: 9,876; Referee: Hong Jin-Ho

16 July 18	Gangwon	1–2	Ulsan Hyundai	Gangneung, Gangwon
19:00 UTC+9	Lee Jung-Woon 38'	Report	Kim Shin-Wook 53'; Lee Jin-Ho 78'	Stadium: Gangneung Stadium; Attendance: 4,020; Referee: Ko Keum-Bok

23 July 19	Daejeon Citizen	1–0	Gangwon	Yuseong-gu, Daejeon
19:00 UTC+9	Cho Hong-Kyu 48'	Report		Stadium: Daejeon World Cup Stadium; Attendance: 14,382; Referee: Ko Hyung-Jin

6 August 20	Gangwon	0–3	Jeonbuk Hyundai Motors	Gangneung, Gangwon
19:00 UTC+9		Report	Kim Dong-Chan (0:39), 7', 18'	Stadium: Gangneung Stadium; Attendance: 2,017; Referee: Lee Min-Hoo

13 August 21	Gangwon	0–2	Pohang Steelers	Gangneung, Gangwon
19:00 UTC+9		Report	Ko Moo-Yeol 49'; Asamoah 59'	Stadium: Gangneung Stadium; Attendance: 2,240; Referee: Lee Sang-Yong

20 August 22	Incheon United	0–0	Gangwon	Seo-gu, Incheon
19:00 UTC+9		Report		Stadium: Incheon Munhak Stadium; Attendance: 5,786; Referee: Lee Sam-Ho

27 August 23	Seoul	6–3	Gangwon	Mapo-gu, Seoul
20:00 UTC+9	Molina 9', 58', 81'; Damjanović 18', 47'; Lee Seung-Yeoul 68'	Report	Yoon Jun-Ha 72'; Seo Dong-Hyun 83' (pen.); Kim Jin-Yong 90'	Stadium: Seoul World Cup Stadium; Attendance: 23,921; Referee: Hong Jin-Ho

10 September 24	Gangwon	2–0	Sangju Sangmu Phoenix	Gangneung, Gangwon
19:00 UTC+9	Seo Dong-Hyun 1'; Jung Sung-Min 81'	Report		Stadium: Gangneung Stadium; Attendance: 3,360; Referee: Lee Sang-Yong

18 September 25	Gangwon	0–1	Suwon Samsung Bluewings	Gangneung, Gangwon
15:00 UTC+9		Report	Neretljak 6'	Stadium: Gangneung Stadium; Attendance: 3,508; Referee: Woo Sang-Il

24 September 26	Gyeongnam	0–0	Gangwon	Miryang, Gyeongnam
19:00 UTC+9		Report	Park Woo-Hyun (yellow card) 26' (yellow-red card) 89'	Stadium: Miryang Stadium; Attendance: 9,036; Referee: Choi Kwang-Bo

1 October 27	Gangwon	1–1	Chunnam Dragons	Chuncheon, Gangwon
19:00 UTC+9	Oh Jae-Seok 90+2'	Report	Wesley 43'	Stadium: Chuncheon Stadium; Attendance: 3,543; Referee: Ko Keum-Bok

8 October 28	Seongnam Ilhwa Chunma	3–1	Gangwon	Seongnam, Gyeonggi
15:00 UTC+9	Radončić 1'; Kim Sung-hwan 9'; Héverton 69'	Report	Kim Young-Hoo 52'	Stadium: Tancheon Sports Complex; Attendance: 3,010; Referee: Lee Sang-Yong

23 October 29	Gangwon	1–0	Daegu	Gangneung, Gangwon
15:00 UTC+9	Kim Jin-Yong 54'	Report		Stadium: Gangneung Stadium; Attendance: 8,826; Referee: Choi Myung-Yong

30 October 30	Busan I'Park	2–0	Gangwon	Yeonje-gu, Busan
15:00 UTC+9	Han Ji-Ho 34'; Yang Dong-Hyun 90+1' (pen.)	Report		Stadium: Busan Asiad Stadium; Attendance: 6,237; Referee: Ko Keum-Bok

==== League table ====
Pos	Team	Pld	W	D	L	GF	GA	GD	Pts
12	Daegu FC	30	8	9	13	35	46	−11	33
13	Incheon United	30	6	14	10	31	40	−9	32
14	Sangju Sangmu Phoenix	30	7	8	15	36	53	−17	29
15	Daejeon Citizen	30	6	9	15	31	59	−28	27
16	Gangwon FC	30	3	6	21	14	45	−31	15

Source: K League
Rules for classification: 1) Points; 2) Goal difference; 3) Goals scored

Pos	Team	Qualification
1	Jeonbuk Hyundai Motors (C)	Qualification for the Champions League group stage
2	Ulsan Hyundai	Qualification for the Champions League group stage
3	Pohang Steelers	Qualification for the Champions League playoff round
4	Suwon Samsung Bluewings	
5	FC Seoul	
6	Busan IPark	

Source: RSSSF
(C) Champions

==== Results summary ====
Overall								Home						Away					
Pld	W	D	L	GF	GA	GD	Pts	W	D	L	GF	GA	GD	W	D	L	GF	GA	GD
30	3	6	21	14	45	−31	15	3	2	10	10	24	−14	0	4	11	4	21	−17

==== Results by round ====
Round	1	2	3	4	5	6	7	8	9	10	11	12	13	14	15	16	17	18	19	20	21	22	23	24	25	26	27	28	29	30
Ground	H	A	A	H	A	A	H	A	H	H	A	A	H	H	A	H	A	H	A	H	H	A	A	H	H	A	H	A	H	A
Result	L	L	L	L	L	L	L	D	D	L	L	D	W	L	L	L	L	L	L	L	L	D	L	W	L	D	D	L	W	L
Position	13	16	16	16	16	16	16	16	16	16	16	16	16	16	16	16	16	16	16	16	16	16	16	16	16	16	16	16	16	16

Updated to match(es) played on 30 October 2011. Source: League Fixtures and Results
A = Away; H = Home; W = Win; D = Draw; L = Loss

=== Korean FA Cup ===
18 May Round of 32	Chungju Hummel	0–0 (a.e.t.) (3–4 p)	Gangwon FC	Gimcheon, Gyeongbuk
19:00 UTC+9				Stadium: Gimcheon Stadium; Attendance: 2,212; Referee: Lee Chun-Soo
	Penalties
	Ryu Won-Hyung (penalty scored); Lee Hae-Jung (penalty missed); Kang Doo-Ho (penalty scored); Son Guk-Hee (penalty scored); Lee Choon-Hyun (penalty missed)		(penalty scored) Kim Young-Hoo; (penalty scored) Lee Chang-Hoon; (penalty scored) Kwon Soon-Hyung; (penalty scored) Lee Min-Kyu

15 June Round of 16	Gangwon FC	1–1 (a.e.t.) (4–3 p)	Daejeon Citizen	Gangneung, Gangwon
19:00 UTC+9	Džakmić 40'		Park Sung-Ho 77'	Stadium: Gangneung Stadium; Attendance: 3,212; Referee: Kim Dong-Jin
	Penalties
	Lee Sang-don (penalty missed); Jang Hyuk-Jin (penalty missed); Kwak Kwang-Seon (penalty scored); Džakmić (penalty missed); Kwon Soon-Hyung (penalty scored); Kim Jung-Joo (penalty missed); Kim Jin-Hwan (penalty scored); Seo Dong-Hyun (penalty missed); Park Sang-Jin (penalty scored)		(penalty missed) Wagner; (penalty scored) Lee Ho; (penalty missed) Hwang Jae-Hun; (penalty missed) Kim Seong-Jun; (penalty scored) Park Sung-Ho; (penalty missed) Kim Han-Seob; (penalty scored) Han Doc-Hee; (penalty missed) Choi Eun-Sung; (penalty missed) Kim Do-yeon

27 July Quarterfinal	Ulsan Hyundai	3–0	Gangwon	Nam-gu, Ulsan
19:00 UTC+9	Go Seul-Ki 7', 30', 50'			Stadium: Munsu Cup Stadium; Attendance: 1,327; Referee: Mae Ho-Young

=== League Cup ===
16 March Group round	Gangwon FC	5–0	Gwangju FC	Chuncheon, Gangwon
19:00 UTC+9	Seo Dong-Hyun 50'; Kwon Soon-Hyung 66'; Kim Young-Hoo 85', 90+2'; Lee Chang-Hoon 90'	Report		Stadium: Chuncheon Stadium; Attendance: 2,320; Referee: Lim Won-Taek

6 April Group round	Gangwon FC	0–0	Chunnam Dragons	Gangneung, Gangwon
19:00 UTC+9		Report		Stadium: Gangneung Stadium; Attendance: 5,150; Referee: Kim Jong-Hyuk

20 April Group round	Ulsan Hyundai	2–1	Gangwon FC	Nam-gu, Ulsan
19:00 UTC+9	Kim Shin-Wook 25'; Seol Ki-Hyeon 35' (pen.)	Report	Seo Dong-Hyun 84'	Stadium: Munsu Cup Stadium; Attendance: 983; Referee: Ryu Hee-Seon

5 May Group round	Gangwon FC	0–2	Busan I'Park	Gangneung, Gangwon
15:00 UTC+9		Report	Choo Sung-Ho 28'; Choi Jin-Ho 66'	Stadium: Gangneung Stadium; Attendance: 13,724; Referee: Kim Dong-Jin

11 May Group round	Sangju Sangmu Phoenix	2–1	Gangwon FC	Sangju, Gyeongbuk
15:00 UTC+9	Kim Dong-hyun 51'; Kim Jung-Woo 88'	Report	Ha Jung-Heon 5'	Stadium: Sangju Stadium; Attendance: 5,445; Referee: Ko Hyung-Jin

== Squad statistics ==
=== Appearances and goals ===
Statistics accurate as of match played 30 October 2011
Numbers in parentheses denote appearances as substitute.

No.	Nat.	Pos.	Name	League		FA Cup		League Cup		Total	
No.	Nat.	Pos.	Name	Apps	Goals	Apps	Goals	Apps	Goals	Apps	Goals
1	KOR	GK	Kim Keun-Bae	8	0	0	0	4	0	12 (0)	0
2	KOR	DF	Lee Sang-don	21	0	2 (1)	0	2	0	25 (1)	0
3	KOR	DF	Park Sang-Jin	18 (2)	0	1 (1)	0	3	0	22 (3)	0
4	KOR	DF	Kwak Kwang-Seon	24	0	2	0	3	0	29 (0)	0
5	KOR	DF	Park Woo-Hyun	5 (1)	0	1	0	0	0	6 (1)	0
6	BIH	MF	Muhamed Džakmić	14	0	3	1	3	0	20 (0)	1
8	KOR	MF	Baek Jong-Hwan	12 (5)	0	0	0	3	0	15 (5)	0
9	CRO	MF	Mateas Delić	3 (7)	0	0	0	3	0	6 (7)	0
10	KOR	FW	Kim Young-Hoo	21 (7)	4	1	0	2 (1)	2	24 (8)	6
12	KOR	DF	Oh Jae-Seok	21 (1)	1	3	0	2	0	26 (1)	1
13	KOR	FW	Yoon Jun-Ha	14 (12)	1	2 (1)	0	2 (2)	0	18 (15)	1
14	KOR	MF	Kwon Soon-Hyung	18 (4)	0	2 (1)	0	3	1	23 (5)	1
15	KOR	DF	Kim Oh-Gyu	1	0	0	0	0	0	1 (0)	0
16	KOR	FW	Chung Kyung-Ho	8 (2)	0	1	0	1	0	10 (2)	0
17	KOR	MF	Lee Jung-Woon	11	1	1	0	0	0	12 (0)	1
18	KOR	FW	Kim Jin-Yong	7 (5)	2	1	0	0	0	8 (5)	2
20	KOR	MF	Ha Jung-Heon	0 (4)	0	0	0	1	1	1 (4)	1
22	KOR	DF	Lee Min-Kyu	10 (1)	0	1 (1)	0	2	0	13 (2)	0
23	KOR	FW	Jung Sung-Min	4 (6)	1	1 (2)	0	1 (2)	0	6 (10)	1
24	KOR	DF	Kim Jin-Hwan	14 (1)	0	1	0	4	0	19 (1)	0
25	KOR	MF	Nam Gwang-Hyun	0	0	0	0	0	0	0	0
26	KOR	MF	Park Tae-Woong	10 (2)	0	0	0	1 (1)	0	11 (3)	0
27	KOR	FW	Seo Dong-Hyun	20 (5)	2	2	0	3	2	25 (5)	4
28	KOR	DF	Lee Jun-Hyung	0 (2)	0	0	0	0 (1)	0	0 (3)	0
29	KOR	FW	Yang Jung-Min	0	0	0	0	0 (1)	0	0 (1)	0
30	KOR	MF	Moon Kyung-Joo	0	0	0	0	0	0	0	0
31	KOR	GK	Yang Han-Bin	0	0	0	0	0	0	0	0
32	KOR	DF	Park Jong-In	0	0	0	0	0	0	0	0
33	KOR	DF	Lee Kyung-Soo	0	0	0	0	0	0	0	0
34	KOR	DF	Ma Sang-Hoon	0	0	0	0	0	0	0	0
35	KOR	FW	Heo Min-Hyuk	0	0	0	0	0	0	0	0
36	KOR	MF	Jang Seok-Min	0	0	0	0	1	0	1 (0)	0
37	KOR	FW	Kim Seok	0	0	0	0	0	0	0	0
38	KOR	MF	Lee Hun	0	0	0	0	0	0	0	0
39	KOR	FW	Kim Jung-Joo	2 (1)	0	0 (1)	0	1	0	3 (2)	0
40	KOR	MF	Kim Woo-Kyung	0	0	0	0	0	0	0	0
41	KOR	GK	Kim Se-Jun	0	0	0	0	0	0	0	0
42	KOR	MF	Lee Shin-Kyu	0	0	0	0	0	0	0	0
43	KOR	DF	Kim Moon-Soo	0	0	0	0	1	0	1 (0)	0
44	KOR	MF	Lee Woo-Hyeok	1 (6)	0	0 (1)	0	0	0	1 (7)	0
45	KOR	FW	Lee Joong-Gwan	0	0	0	0	0	0	0	0
46	KOR	MF	Kim Eun-Hu	1 (2)	0	0 (1)	0	2 (1)	0	3 (4)	0
51	KOR	GK	Yoo Hyun	21	0	3	0	1	0	25 (0)	0
5	KOR	DF	Park Ji-Yong (out)	10	0	1	0	2	0	13 (0)	0
7	KOR	MF	Lee Eul-Yong (retired)	17 (2)	1	2	0	1	0	20 (2)	1
17	KOR	MF	Chang Hyuk-Jin (loan out)	1 (4)	0	1 (1)	0	1 (2)	0	3 (7)	0
18	CRO	DF	Stipe Lapić (out)	1	0	0	0	0	0	1 (0)	0
19	KOR	MF	Lee Chang-Hoon (out)	10 (2)	0	1	0	2 (2)	1	13 (4)	1
21	JPN	MF	Masahiro Ōhashi (out)	1 (3)	0	0	0	0 (1)	0	1 (4)	0

=== Top scorers ===
Rank	Nation	Number	Name	K-League	KFA Cup	League Cup	Total
1	(South Korea)	10	Kim Young-Hoo	4	0	2	6
2	(South Korea)	27	Seo Dong-Hyun	2	0	2	4
3	(South Korea)	18	Kim Jin-Yong	2	0	0	2
4	(South Korea)	7	Lee Eul-Yong	1	0	0	1
=	(South Korea)	12	Oh Jae-Seok	1	0	0	1
=	(South Korea)	13	Yoon Jun-Ha	1	0	0	1
=	(South Korea)	17	Lee Jung-Woon	1	0	0	1
=	(South Korea)	23	Jung Sung-Min	1	0	0	1
=	(Bosnia and Herzegovina)	6	Muhamed Džakmić	0	1	0	1
=	(South Korea)	14	Kwon Soon-Hyung	0	0	1	1
=	(South Korea)	19	Lee Chang-Hoon	0	0	1	1
=	(South Korea)	20	Ha Jung-Heon	0	0	1	1
/	/	/	Own Goals	1	0	0	1
/	/	/	TOTALS	14	1	7	22

=== Top assistors ===
Rank	Nation	Number	Name	K-League	KFA Cup	League Cup	Total
1	(South Korea)	13	Yoon Jun-Ha	2	0	1	3
2	(South Korea)	2	Lee Sang-don	2	0	0	2
=	(South Korea)	19	Lee Chang-Hoon	0	0	2	2
3	(Bosnia and Herzegovina)	6	Muhamed Džakmić	1	0	0	1
=	(South Korea)	7	Lee Eul-Yong	1	0	0	1
=	(South Korea)	12	Oh Jae-Seok	1	0	0	1
=	(South Korea)	26	Park Tae-Woong	1	0	0	1
=	(South Korea)	27	Seo Dong-Hyun	1	0	0	1
=	(South Korea)	16	Chung Kyung-Ho	0	0	1	1
=	(Japan)	21	Masahiro Ōhashi	0	0	1	1
=	(South Korea)	46	Kim Eun-Hu	0	0	1	1
/	/	/	TOTALS	9	0	6	15

=== Discipline ===
Position	Nation	Number	Name	K-League		KFA Cup		League Cup		Total	
Position	Nation	Number	Name	Booked	Sent off (straight red)	Booked	Sent off (straight red)	Booked	Sent off (straight red)	Booked	Sent off (straight red)
GK	(South Korea)	1	Kim Keun-Bae	1	0	0	0	0	0	1	0
DF	(South Korea)	2	Lee Sang-don	2	0	0	0	0	0	2	0
DF	(South Korea)	3	Park Sang-Jin	3	0	0	0	0	0	3	0
DF	(South Korea)	4	Kwak Kwang-Seon	6	0	0	0	0	0	6	0
DF	(South Korea)	5	Park Ji-Yong	6	0	1	0	1	0	8	0
DF	(South Korea)	5	Park Woo-Hyun	5	1	0	0	0	0	5	1
MF	(Bosnia and Herzegovina)	6	Muhamed Džakmić	4	0	1	0	0	0	5	0
MF	(South Korea)	7	Lee Eul-Yong	1	0	0	0	1	0	2	0
MF	(South Korea)	8	Baek Jong-Hwan	2	0	0	0	0	0	2	0
DF	(South Korea)	12	Oh Jae-Seok	5	0	0	0	0	0	5	0
FW	(South Korea)	13	Yoon Jun-Ha	2	0	0	0	0	0	2	0
MF	(South Korea)	14	Kwon Soon-Hyung	3	0	0	0	0	0	3	0
FW	(South Korea)	16	Chung Kyung-Ho	3	0	0	0	0	0	3	0
FW	(South Korea)	18	Kim Jin-Yong	2	0	0	0	0	0	2	0
DF	(South Korea)	22	Lee Min-Kyu	2	0	1	0	0	0	3	0
FW	(South Korea)	23	Jung Sung-Min	0	0	1	0	0	0	1	0
DF	(South Korea)	24	Kim Jin-Hwan	1	0	0	0	1	0	2	0
MF	(South Korea)	26	Park Tae-Woong	4	0	0	0	1	0	5	0
FW	(South Korea)	27	Seo Dong-Hyun	4	0	0	0	2	0	6	0
FW	(South Korea)	39	Kim Jung-Joo	1	0	0	0	0	0	1	0
DF	(South Korea)	43	Kim Moon-Soo	0	0	0	0	1	0	1	0
MF	(South Korea)	44	Lee Woo-Hyeok	1	0	0	0	0	0	1	0
MF	(South Korea)	46	Kim Eun-Hu	1	0	0	0	0	0	1	0
/	/	/	TOTALS	58	1	4	0	7	0	69	1

== Transfer ==
=== In ===
Date	Pos.	Name	From	Source
9 November 2010	DF	(South Korea) Kim Oh-Gyu	(South Korea) Kwandong University	Draft (1st)
9 November 2010	DF	(South Korea) Lee Jun-Hyung	(South Korea) Chosun University	Draft (2nd)
9 November 2010	DF	(South Korea) Kim Jin-Hwan	(South Korea) Kyunghee University	Draft (3rd)
9 November 2010	DF	(South Korea) Lee Min-Kyu	(South Korea) Hongik University	Draft (4th)
9 November 2010	FW	(South Korea) Chang Hyuk-Jin	(South Korea) Gangneung City FC	Draft (5th)
9 November 2010	FW	(South Korea) Jung Sung-Min	(South Korea) Kwangwoon University	Draft (6th)
9 November 2010	MF	(South Korea) Lee Joong-Kwan	(South Korea) Cheonan Jeil High School	Draft (Extra)
9 November 2010	MF	(South Korea) Lee Woo-Hyuk	(South Korea) Munseong High School	Draft (Extra)
9 November 2010	MF	(South Korea) Moon Kyung-Joo	(South Korea) Mukho High School	Draft (Extra)
9 November 2010	MF	(South Korea) Lee Sin-Kyu	(South Korea) Chuncheon High School	Draft (Extra)
December 2010	DF	(South Korea) Ma Sang-Hoon	(South Korea) Suncheon High School	Draft (Supplement)
December 2010	DF	(South Korea) Park Jong-In	(South Korea) Hanyang High School	Draft (Supplement)
December 2010	MF	(South Korea) Kim Seok	(South Korea) Cheonan City FC	Draft (Supplement)
9 January 2011	MF	(Bosnia and Herzegovina) Muhamed Džakmić	(Bosnia and Herzegovina) FK Sarajevo	
9 January 2011	FW	(Croatia) Mateas Delić	(Croatia) Slaven Belupo	
27 January 2011	DF	(South Korea) Park Ji-Yong	(South Korea) Chunnam Dragons	
27 January 2011	MF	(South Korea) Kim Eun-Hu	(South Korea) Jeonbuk Hyundai Motors	
27 January 2011	MF	(South Korea) Nam Gwang-Hyun	(South Korea) Chunnam Dragons	
27 January 2011	MF	(South Korea) Park Tae-Woong	(South Korea) Gyeongnam FC	
February 2011	FW	(South Korea) Heo Min-Hyuk	(South Korea) Cheonan Jeil High School	Draft (Supplement)
February 2011	MF	(South Korea) Jang Seok-Min	(South Korea) Chodang University	Draft (Supplement)
February 2011	FW	(South Korea) Yang Jung-Min	(South Korea) Daesin High school	Draft (Supplement)
February 2011	GK	(South Korea) Kim Se-Jun	(South Korea) Cheonggu High School	Draft (Supplement)
4 July 2011	FW	(South Korea) Kim Jin-Yong	(South Korea) Seongnam Ilhwa Chunma	
4 July 2011	MF	(South Korea) Lee Jung-Woon	(South Korea) Gangneung City FC	
14 July 2011	DF	(South Korea) Park Woo-Hyun	(South Korea) Busan I'Park	

=== Out ===
Date	Pos.	Name	To	Source
29 November 2010	DF	(South Korea) Lee Yoon-Eui	(South Korea) Sangju Sangmu FC	Military duty
29 November 2010	DF	(South Korea) Kang Min-Woo	(South Korea) Sangju Sangmu FC	Military duty
29 November 2010	FW	(South Korea) Oh Won-Jong	(South Korea) Sangju Sangmu FC	Military duty
December 2011	FW	(North Macedonia) Baže Ilijoski	(North Macedonia) FK Metalurg Skopje	
December 2011	MF	(Brazil) Renato Medeiros	unattached	
December 2011	MF	(China) Li Chunyu	unattached	
January 2011	MF	(South Korea) Kim Sung-Kyun	(South Korea) Chunnam Dragons	
January 2011	MF	(South Korea) Lee Jung-Woon	(South Korea) Gangneung City FC	
January 2011	FW	(South Korea) Lee Dong-Hyun	(South Korea) Gangneung City FC	
January 2011	MF	(South Korea) Kim Chang-Hee	(South Korea) Gangneung City FC	
January 2011	MF	(South Korea) Ahn Sung-Nam	(South Korea) Gwangju FC	Loan
January 2011	GK	(South Korea) Jeong San	(South Korea) Seongnam Ilhwa Chunma	
January 2011	DF	(South Korea) Kim Bong-Kyum	(South Korea) Ulsan Mipo Dockyard	
January 2011	DF	(South Korea) Ha Jae-Hoon	unattached	Free agent
January 2011	MF	(South Korea) Kang Sun-Kyu	unattached	Free agent
January 2011	MF	(South Korea) Kim Seung-Myung	unattached	Free agent
January 2011	FW	(South Korea) Lee Joon-Hyup	unattached	Free agent
January 2011	MF	(South Korea) Baek Yong-Sun	unattached	Free agent
January 2011	MF	(South Korea) Kim Dong-Min	unattached	Free agent
January 2011	MF	(South Korea) Seo Bo-Sung	unattached	Free agent
January 2011	DF	(South Korea) Ko Jae-Min	unattached	Free agent
January 2011	MF	(South Korea) Son Dae-Sung	unattached	Free agent
January 2011	FW	(South Korea) Kim Dae-Sik	unattached	Free agent
4 July 2011	MF	(South Korea) Lee Chang-Hoon	(South Korea) Seongnam Ilhwa Chunma	
7 July 2011	DF	(Croatia) Stipe Lapić	Free agent	
7 July 2011	MF	(Japan) Masahiro Ōhashi	Free agent	
7 July 2011	DF	(South Korea) Park Ji-Yong	Released (under arrest)	
23 October 2011	MF	(South Korea) Lee Eul-Yong	Retired	
