= List of South Korean football transfers summer 2012 =

This is a list of South Korean football transfers for the 2012 season transfer window.

== Transfers ==
Player	Position	Moving from	Moving to	Fee
Ahn Jong-hun (loan)	Forward	Jeju United	Mokpo City	
(Albania) Sokol Cikalleshi (loan)	Midfielder	(Albania) Besa Kavajë	Incheon United	
An Il-joo (draft)	Defender	Pohang Steelers	Sangju Sangmu Phoenix	Free
(Australia) Alex Wilkinson	Defender	(Australia) Central Coast Mariners	Jeonbuk Hyundai Motors	Free
(Australia) Brendan Hamill	Defender	(Australia) Melbourne Heart	Seongnam Ilhwa Chunma	
(Australia) Saša Ognenovski	Defender	Seongnam Ilhwa Chunma	(Qatar) Umm Salal	
(Brazil) Alex Terra	Forward	(Australia) Melbourne Victory	Daejeon Citizen	Free
(Brazil) Henan Silveira	Forward	(Brazil) Red Bull Brasil	Jeonnam Dragons	Free
(Brazil) Jael Ferreira	Forward	(Brazil) Sport	Seongnam Ilhwa Chunma	
(Brazil) Leo	Forward	Daejeon Citizen	(Brazil) Santa Cruz	Free
(Brazil) Leonardo	Midfielder	(Greece) AEK Athens	Jeonbuk Hyundai Motors	
(Brazil) Lúcio Flávio (loan)	Midfielder	(Brazil) Guaratinguetá	Jeonnam Dragons	
(Brazil) Luiz Henrique	Midfielder	Jeonbuk Hyundai Motors	(United Arab Emirates) Al-Shabab	
(Brazil) Nando	Midfielder	Incheon United	(Brazil) Portuguesa	
(Brazil) Paulo	Midfielder	Jeonnam Dragons		Free
(Brazil) Paulo Júnior	Forward	(United Arab Emirates) Dibba Al Fujairah	Incheon United	Free
(Brazil) Rafinha (loan)	Forward	(Brazil) Nacional-SP	Ulsan Hyundai	
(Brazil) Renan Marques	Forward	(Brazil) Paulista	Jeju United	Free
(Brazil) Robert	Forward	Jeju United	(Brazil) Ceará	Free
(Brazil) Silva	Midfielder	Jeonnam Dragons		Free
Byun Sung-hwan	Defender	(Australia) Newcastle United Jets	Seongnam Ilhwa Chunma	Free
Byun Woong (loan)	Midfielder	Ulsan Hyundai	Hyundai Mipo Dockyard	
(China) Huang Bowen	Midfielder	Jeonbuk Hyundai Motors	(China) Guangzhou Evergrande	
Cho Sung-tae	Forward	Incheon United		Free
Choi Chul-soon (draft)	Defender	Jeonbuk Hyundai Motors	Sangju Sangmu Phoenix	Free
Choi Jae-soo	Defender	Ulsan Hyundai	Suwon Samsung Bluewings	
Choi Sung-hwan	Defender	Suwon Samsung Bluewings	Ulsan Hyundai	
Chun Jae-ho	Defender	Busan IPark	Gangwon FC	Free
(Colombia) Javier Reina	Midfielder	(Brazil) Ceará	Seongnam Ilhwa Chunma	
(Croatia) Mateas Delić	Forward	Gangwon FC	(Croatia) Slaven Belupo	Free
Denis Laktionov	Midfielder	(Russia) Tom Tomsk	Gangwon FC	Free
Han Dong-won	Forward	Seongnam Ilhwa Chunma	Gangwon FC	
Han Sang-woon	Midfielder	Seongnam Ilhwa Chunma	(Japan) Júbilo Iwata	
Hong Sun-man (loan)	Midfielder	Incheon United	Cheonan City	
Jang Won-seok	Defender	Incheon United	Jeju United	
Jeon Jae-ho	Defender	Busan IPark	Gangwon FC	Free
Jeong Shung-hoon	Forward	Jeonbuk Hyundai Motors	Jeonnam Dragons	
(Japan) Akihiro Ienaga (loan)	Midfielder	Ulsan Hyundai	(Japan) Gamba Osaka	
(Japan) Sergio Escudero (loan)	Midfielder	(Japan) Urawa Red Diamonds	FC Seoul	
Jung Jae-yoon (loan)	Defender	Incheon United	Yongin City	
Jung Jo-gook	Forward	(France) Auxerre	FC Seoul	Free
Jung Soo-woon	Forward	Incheon United		Free
Kim Byung-suk	Midfielder	(Saudi Arabia) Al-Nassr	Daejeon Citizen	Free
Kim Eun-hu	Midfielder	Gangwon FC	Mokpo City	Free
Kim Hyo-gi (loan)	Forward	Ulsan Hyundai	Hyundai Mipo Dockyard	
Kim Hyun-sung (loan)	Forward	FC Seoul	(Japan) Shimizu S-Pulse	
Kim Jae-hwan (loan)	Defender	Jeonbuk Hyundai Motors	(Japan) Consadole Sapporo	
Kim Jong-gook (loan)	Midfielder	Ulsan Hyundai	Gangwon FC (6 months)	
Kim Joon-beom (loan)	Midfielder	Gangwon FC	Gangneung City (6 months)	
Kim Min-koo	Forward	Daegu FC	Daejeon KHNP	Free
Kim Seo-joon (loan)	Midfielder	Ulsan Hyundai	Hyundai Mipo Dockyard	
Kim Seul-gi (loan)	Forward	Daejeon Citizen	Incheon Korail	
Kim Shin-young	Forward	Jeonnam Dragons	Jeonbuk Hyundai Motors	
Kim Tae-eun	Defender	Incheon United	Incheon Korail	Free
Lee Chang-won	Defeder	Seongnam Ilhwa Chunma		Free
Lee Gang-jin (loan)	Defender	Jeonbuk Hyundai Motors	(Japan) Machida Zelvia	
Lee Gwang-jae	Forward	(Thailand) Phichit	Daegu FC	Free
Lee Jung-woon (loan)	Midfielder	Gangwon FC	Gangneung City (6 months)	
Lee Jung-youl	Defender	FC Seoul	Daejeon Citizen	Free
Lee Sang-hyup (draft)	Midfielder	Jeju United	Sangju Sangmu Phoenix	Free
Lee Seung-hee (loan)	Midfielder	Jeonnam Dragons	Jeju United	
Lee Seung-yeoul (loan)	Forward	(Japan) Gamba Osaka	Ulsan Hyundai	
Lee Yoon-ho	Defender	Hyundai Mipo Dockyard	Gangwon FC	
Ma Chul-jun	Defender	Jeju United	Jeonbuk Hyundai Motors	
Nam Joon-jae	Midfielder	Jeju United	Incheon United	
Noh Yong-hun	Midfielder	Gangwon FC	Daejeon Citizen	Free
Park Jung-hoon (loan)	Midfielder	Jeonnam Dragons	Gangwon FC (6 months)	
Park Tae-woong	Midfielder	Gangwon FC	Suwon Samsung Bluewings	Free
(Romania) Ianis Zicu (loan)	Midfielder	Pohang Steelers	Gangwon FC (6 months)	
Seo Young-won	Midfielder	Incheon United		Free
Shim Young-sung (loan)	Forward	Jeju United	Gangwon FC (6 months)	
Shin Hyung-min	Midfielder	Pohang Steelers	(United Arab Emirates) Al-Jazira	
(Serbia) Vladimir Jovančić (loan)	Forward	Seongnam Ilhwa Chunma	(China) Tianjin Teda	
Yang Joon-a (loan)	Midfielder	Jeju United	Jeonnam Dragons	
Yoon Seung-hyeon (loan)	Midfielder	FC Seoul	Seongnam Ilhwa Chunma	
