= Ji-yong =

- Hangul: 지용
- RR: Jiyong
- MR: Chiyong

Ji-yong (Korean: 지용) is a Korean given name. Notable people with the name include:

== Real people ==
- Jeong Ji-yong, Korean poet
- Kang Ji-yong (1989–2025), South Korean football defender
- Kim Ji-yong (cinematographer), South Korean cinematographer and director
- Kim Ji-yong (pitcher) (born 1988), South Korean baseball pitcher
- Ko Ji-yong, South Korean businessman and singer
- Kwon Ji-yong, South Korean rapper, singer-songwriter, and entrepreneur
- Lee Ji-yong (born 1999), South Korean football winger
- Park Ji-yong (born 1983), South Korean football defender

== Fictional characters ==
- Kim Ji-yong, Korean National Police University student in the South Korean TV series Vigilante (2023–present)
- Park Ji-yong, family patriarch in the 2024 South Korean horror film Exhuma
