= Kim Joon-beom =

Kim Joon-beom may refer to:

- Kim Joon-beom (footballer, born 1986)
- Kim Joon-beom (footballer, born 1998)
