= Lee Jae-hoon =

Lee Jae-hoon or Lee Jae-hun (Korean: 이재훈) is a Korean name consisting of the family name Lee and the given name Jae-hun, and may also refer to:

- Lee Jae-hoon (singer) (born 1976), South Korean singer
- Lee Jae-hun (athlete) (born 1976), South Korean athlete
- Lee Jae-hun (footballer) (born 1990), South Korean footballer
