= Kim Da-bin =

Kim Da-bin may refer to:

- Kim Da-bin (tennis) (born 1997), South Korean tennis player
- Kim Dong-wook (footballer) (born 1989 as Kim Da-bin), South Korean footballer
