= Kim Ji-yong =

Kim Ji-yong (Korean: 김지용) can refer to:

- Kim Ji-yong (cinematographer), South Korean cinematographer
- Kim Ji-yong (pitcher) (born 1988), South Korean baseball pitcher
- Kim Ji-yong, fictional family patriarch in the 2024 South Korean horror film Exhuma
