= Chung Yoo-suk =

South Korean footballer (born 1977)

Chung Yoo-Suk
Personal information
- Date of birth: 25 October 1977 (age 49)
- Place of birth: Ulsan, South Korea
- Height: 1.86 m (6 ft 1 in)
- Position: Goalkeeper

Youth career
- Ajou University

Senior career*
Years	Team	Apps	(Gls)
2000–2009	Busan I'Park	120	(0)
2004–2005	→ Gwangju Sangmu (loan)	25	(0)
2010	Gangneung City	23	(0)
2011	Ulsan Hyundai	0	(0)
Total		168	(0)

International career
1997	South Korea U20		
1999	South Korea U23	3	(0)
- * Club domestic league appearances and goals

- Chung Yoo-suk
- Hangul: 정유석
- Hanja: 鄭裕錫
- RR: Jeong Yuseok
- MR: Chŏng Yusŏk

Chung Yoo-Suk (Korean: 정유석; born 25 October 1977) is a South Korean former professional footballer who played as a goalkeeper for Busan I'Park, Gwangju Sangmu (military service), National League side Gangneung City and Ulsan Hyundai.

== Career statistics ==
Appearances and goals by club, season and competition
Club	Season	League			KFA Cup		League Cup		Asia		Total	
Club	Season	Division	Apps	Goals	Apps	Goals	Apps	Goals	Apps	Goals	Apps	Goals
Busan I'cons	2000	K-League	20	0			2	0	—		22	0
Busan I'cons	2001	K-League	24	0			11	0	—		35	0
Busan I'cons	2002	K-League	20	0			7	0	—		27	0
Busan I'cons	2003	K-League	8	0	0	0	—		—		8	0
Gwangju Sangmu	2004	K-League	11	0	3	0	3	0	—		17	0
Gwangju Sangmu	2005	K-League	14	0	0	0	10	0	—		24	0
Busan I'Park	2006	K-League	22	0	2	0	12	0	—		36	0
Busan I'Park	2007	K-League	21	0	3	0	5	0	—		29	0
Busan I'Park	2008	K-League	4	0	0	0	3	0	—		7	0
Busan I'Park	2009	K-League	1	0	0	0	0	0	—		1	0
Gangneung City	2010	National League	23	0	1	0	—		—		24	0
Career total			168	0	9	0	53	0	0	0	230	0
