= Kim Jun-yeop =

South Korean footballer (born 1998)

Kim Jun-Yeop
Personal information
- Full name: Kim Jun-Yeop
- Date of birth: 10 May 1988 (age 38)
- Place of birth: South Korea
- Height: 1.78 m (5 ft 10 in)
- Positions: Midfielder; forward

Team information
- Current team: Incheon United
- Number: 17

Youth career
- Hongik University

Senior career*
Years	Team	Apps	(Gls)
2010–2012	Jeju United	11	(0)
2013	Gwangju FC	29	(5)
2014–2017	Gyeongnam FC	47	(0)
2016–2017	→ Asan Mugunghwa (army)	46	(1)
2018	Bucheon FC	31	(1)
2019	Daegu FC	22	(0)
2020–	Incheon United	86	(2)
- * Club domestic league appearances and goals as of 1 September 2022

Kim Jun-Yeop (Korean: 김준엽; born 10 May 1988) is a South Korean footballer who plays as a midfielder and forward for Incheon United. He previously had spells in K League 1 for Daegu FC, Jeju United amongst others.
