= Choi Moo-lim =

South Korean footballer (born 1979)

Choi Moo-Lim
Personal information
- Full name: Choi Moo-Lim
- Date of birth: 15 April 1979 (age 47)
- Place of birth: South Korea
- Height: 1.85 m (6 ft 1 in)
- Position: Goalkeeper

Youth career
- Daegu University

Senior career*
Years	Team	Apps	(Gls)
2002–2011	Ulsan Hyundai	4	(0)
2006–2007	→ Gwangju Sangmu (army)	12	(0)
2012	Ulsan Hyundai Mipo Dockyard	25	(0)
- * Club domestic league appearances and goals as of 15 December 2011

- Choi Moo-lim
- Hangul: 최무림
- Hanja: 崔茂林
- RR: Choe Murim
- MR: Ch'oe Murim

Choi Moo-Lim (Korean: 최무림; born 15 April 1979) is a former football goalkeeper from South Korea. He formerly played for Ulsan Hyundai in the K-League for 10 seasons.
