= Park Seung-il =

South Korean footballer

Park Seung-Il
Personal information
- Date of birth: January 8, 1989 (age 37)
- Place of birth: South Korea
- Height: 1.78 m (5 ft 10 in)
- Position: Forward

Youth career
- Kyunghee University

Senior career*
Years	Team	Apps	(Gls)
2010–2015	Ulsan Hyundai	25	(2)
2013	→ Chunnam Dragons (loan)	1	(0)
2013	→ Jeju United (loan)	3	(0)
2014–2015	→ Sangju Sangmu (military service)	11	(0)
2016–2017	FC Anyang	30	(2)
2018–2019	Saif Sporting Club	10	(1)
- * Club domestic league appearances and goals as of 12:21,1 May 2019 (UTC)

Park Seung-Il (Korean: 박승일) is a South Korean former professional footballer who last played as a forward for BPL side Saif Sporting.

== Club career ==
Park joined Ulsan Hyundai in 2010 as one of the club's picks from the draft intake. Unused throughout the 2010 K-League season, Park made his first league appearance on 23 April 2011, coming on as a late substitute in Ulsan's away loss to the Pohang Steelers. He scored his first professional goal on 17 September 2011, in Ulsan's 3–1 win over Sangju Sangmu Phoenix.

He unsuccessfully trialled for Malaysia Super League team Terengganu F.C. I in January 2018.

== Club career statistics ==
As of 10 December 2013

Club performance			League		Cup		League Cup		Continental		Total	
Season	Club	League	Apps	Goals	Apps	Goals	Apps	Goals	Apps	Goals	Apps	Goals
South Korea			League		KFA Cup		League Cup		Asia		Total	
2010	Ulsan Hyundai	K League 1	0	0	0	0	0	0	-		0	0
2011	Ulsan Hyundai	K League 1	19	2	1	0	2	0	-		22	2
2012	Ulsan Hyundai	K League 1	6	0	0	0	-		2	0	8	0
2013	Chunnam Dragons	K League 1	1	0	0	0	-		-		1	0
2013	Jeju United	K League 1	3	0	0	0	-		-		3	0
Career total			29	2	1	0	2	0	2	0	34	2
