= Kim Jong-kook (footballer) =

South Korean footballer

Personal information
- Date of birth: 8 January 1989 (age 37)
- Place of birth: South Korea
- Height: 1.79 m (5 ft 10 1/2 in)
- Position: Midfielder

Team information
- Current team: Chungnam Asan
- Number: 20

Senior career*
Years	Team	Apps	(Gls)
2011–2013	Ulsan Hyundai	7	(0)
2012	→ Gangwon FC (loan)	16	(0)
2014–2015	Daejeon Citizen	52	(2)
2016–	Suwon FC	40	(2)
2017–2018	→ Asan Mugunghwa (army)	26	(2)
2018-19	Suwon FC	14	(0)
2020-	Chungnam Asan FC	40	(0)
- * Club domestic league appearances and goals as of 10 October 2022

Kim Jong-kook (Korean: 김종국; born 8 January 1989) is a South Korean footballer who plays as a midfielder for Chungnam Asan FC in the K League 2.
