= Kim Jung-joo (footballer) =

South Korean footballer

Personal information
- Full name: Kim Jung-joo (김정주)
- Date of birth: September 26, 1991 (age 35)
- Place of birth: South Korea
- Height: 1.70 m (5 ft 7 in)
- Position: Forward

Team information
- Current team: Daejeon Citizen
- Number: 11

Youth career
- 2007–2009: Gangneung Jeil High School

Senior career*
Years	Team	Apps	(Gls)
2010–2013	Gangwon FC	13	(0)
2013–2014	→ Gangneung City (loan)	22	(1)
2014	Gangneung City	23	(5)
2015–2016	Ulsan Hyundai Mipo	23	(4)
2017–	Daejeon Citizen	0	(0)
- * Club domestic league appearances and goals as of 1 January 2017

- Kim Jung-joo
- Hangul: 김정주
- Hanja: 金正柱
- RR: Gim Jeongju
- MR: Kim Chŏngju

Kim Jung-joo (Korean: 김정주; Hanja: 金正柱, born 26 September 1991) is a South Korean football player who plays as a forward for South Korean club that K League Challenge side Daejeon Citizen.

== Club career ==
=== Gangwon FC ===
On 17 November 2009, Gangwon called him as extra order at 2010 K-League Draft. His first K-League match was against Pohang Steelers in Pohang that Gangwon lose by 0-4 in away game by substitute on 20 March 2010.

=== Statistics ===
As of 31 October 2011

Club performance			League		Cup		League Cup		Total	
Season	Club	League	Apps	Goals	Apps	Goals	Apps	Goals	Apps	Goals
South Korea			League		KFA Cup		League Cup		Total	
2010	Gangwon FC	K-League	6	0	1	0	1	0	8	0
2011	Gangwon FC	K-League	3	0	1	0	1	0	5	0
Career total			9	0	2	0	2	0	13	0
