= Lee Min-kyu =

South Korean footballer

Personal information
- Date of birth: 6 January 1989 (age 37)
- Place of birth: South Korea
- Height: 1.76 m (5 ft 9 1/2 in)
- Position: Defender

Youth career
- 2004–2006: Eonnam High School
- 2007–2010: Hongik University

Senior career*
Years	Team	Apps	(Gls)
2011–2012	Gangwon FC	21	(0)
2013–2014	Chungju Hummel	27	(0)
- * Club domestic league appearances and goals as of 28 November 2014

- Lee Min-kyu
- Hangul: 이민규
- Hanja: 李敏圭
- RR: I Mingyu
- MR: I Min'gyu

Lee Min-kyu (Korean: 이민규; born 6 January 1989) is a South Korean former football defender. He played for Gangwon FC and Chungju Hummel in the K League.

== Club career ==
After completing his university education at Hongik University, Lee was placed on the 2011 intake of the K League draft. Joining Gangwon FC as their fourth choice pick, his first game for his new club was as a starter in the second round match of the 2011 K-League Cup against the Chunnam Dragons. Four days later on 10 April, Lee made his debut in the K League itself, playing in Gangwon's 1–0 loss to Ulsan Hyundai.

== Club career statistics ==
As of 5 January 2026

Club performance			League		Cup		League Cup		Total	
Season	Club	League	Apps	Goals	Apps	Goals	Apps	Goals	Apps	Goals
Korea Republic			League		FA Cup		K-League Cup		Total	
2011	Gangwon FC	K League	12	0	2	0	2	0	16	0
2012	Gangwon FC	K League	9	0	1	0	–		10	0
2013	Chungju Hummel FC	K League Challenge	16	0	0	0	–		16	0
2014	Chungju Hummel FC	K League Challenge	11	0	0	0	–		11	0
Total			48	0	3	0	2	0	50	0
