= Choi Jae-soo =

South Korean footballer (born 1983)

Choi Jae-Soo
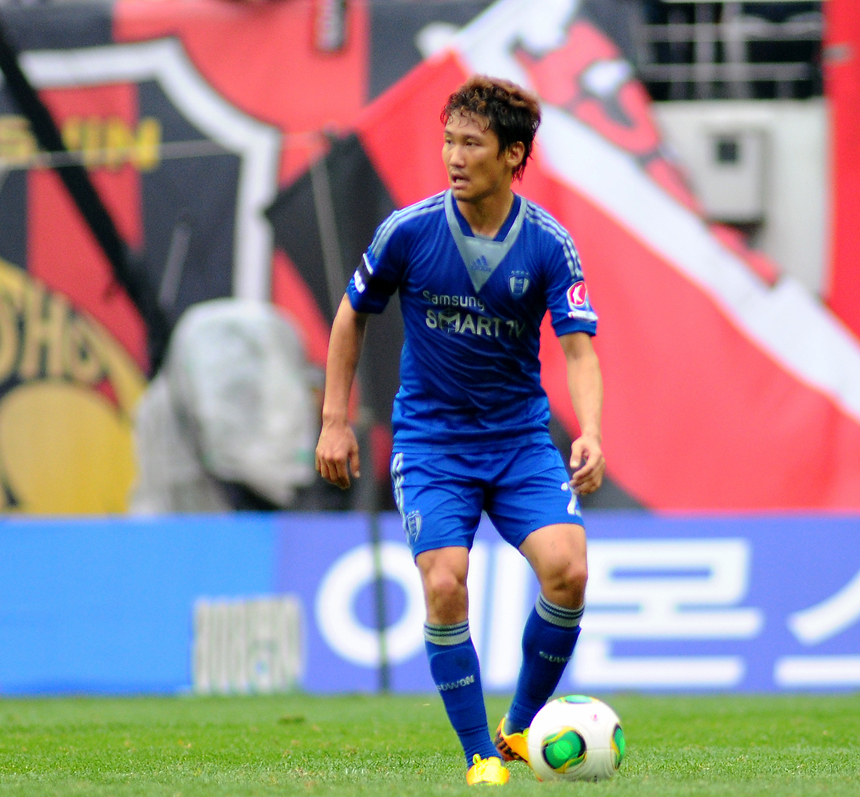

Personal information
- Date of birth: 2 May 1983 (age 43)
- Place of birth: Hongcheon, Gangwon, South Korea
- Height: 1.75 m (5 ft 9 in)
- Positions: Left-back; left winger

Youth career
- 2000–2003: Yonsei University

Senior career*
Years	Team	Apps	(Gls)
2004–2009	FC Seoul	21	(1)
2008–2009	→ Gwangju Sangmu (loan)	33	(3)
2010–2012	Ulsan Hyundai	63	(1)
2012–2015	Suwon Bluewings	66	(2)
2015	→ Pohang Steelers (loan)	16	(2)
2016	Jeonbuk Hyundai	12	(0)
2017–2019	Gyeongnam FC	60	(2)
Total		271	(11)
- * Club domestic league appearances and goals

- Choi Jae-soo
- Hangul: 최재수
- Hanja: 崔在洙
- RR: Choe Jaesu
- MR: Ch'oe Chaesu

Choi Jae-Soo (Korean: 최재수; born 2 May 1983) is a South Korean former professional footballer who played as left-back for Gyeongnam FC.

On 22 October 2009, he was discharged from the army and returned to FC Seoul. Choi officially signed a two-year contract with Ulsan Hyundai for an undisclosed fee on 26 January 2010.

== Career statistics ==
Appearances and goals by club, season and competition
Club	Season	League			Korean FA Cup		K-League Cup		Asia		Total	
Club	Season	Division	Apps	Goals	Apps	Goals	Apps	Goals	Apps	Goals	Apps	Goals
FC Seoul	2004	K League 1	0	0	0	0	7	0	–		7	0
FC Seoul	2005	K League 1	17	1	1	0	0	0	–		18	1
FC Seoul	2006	K League 1	4	0	1	1	7	0	–		12	1
FC Seoul	2007	K League 1	0	0	0	0	1	0	–		1	0
FC Seoul	2009	K League 1	0	0	0	0	0	0	–		0	0
Gwangju Sangmu (loan)	2008	K League 1	19	0	3	1	7	0	–		29	1
Gwangju Sangmu (loan)	2009	K League 1	14	3	2	1	4	0	–		20	4
Ulsan Hyundai	2010	K League 1	23	0			5	0	–		28	0
Career total			77	4	7	3	31	0	–		115	7
