= Ko Chang-hyun =

South Korean footballer (born 1983)

Ko Chang-Hyun
Personal information
- Full name: Ko Chang-Hyun
- Date of birth: September 15, 1983 (age 43)
- Place of birth: South Korea
- Height: 1.70 m (5 ft 7 in)
- Positions: Attacking midfielder; winger

Senior career*
Years	Team	Apps	(Gls)
2002–2004	Suwon Samsung Bluewings	23	(0)
2005–2008	Busan I'Park	19	(2)
2007–2008	→ Gwangju Sangmu (Army)	41	(2)
2009–2010	Daejeon Citizen	29	(13)
2010–2015	Ulsan Hyundai	103	(13)

International career^{‡}
2002	South Korea U-20	3	(0)
- * Club domestic league appearances and goals as of 10 December 2015 ‡ National team caps and goals as of 20 November 2008

- Ko Chang-hyun
- Hangul: 고창현
- Hanja: 高昌賢
- RR: Go Changhyeon
- MR: Ko Ch'anghyŏn

Ko Chang-Hyun (born September 15, 1983) is a South Korean football player who lastly played for Ulsan Hyundai FC.

== Club career statistics ==
As of April 18, 2011.

Club performance			League		Cup		League Cup		Continental		Total	
Season	Club	League	Apps	Goals	Apps	Goals	Apps	Goals	Apps	Goals	Apps	Goals
South Korea			League		KFA Cup		League Cup		Asia		Total	
2002	Suwon Samsung Bluewings	K-League	2	0			3	0			5	0
2003	Suwon Samsung Bluewings	K-League	17	0	1	0	-		-		18	0
2004	Suwon Samsung Bluewings	K-League	4	0	2	0	2	0	-		8	0
2005	Busan I'Park	K-League	6	0	1	1	3	0			10	1
2006	Busan I'Park	K-League	13	2	1	0	6	0	-		20	2
2007	Gwangju Sangmu	K-League	18	0	2	0	6	0	-		26	0
2008	Gwangju Sangmu	K-League	23	2	2	0	6	2	-		31	4
2009	Daejeon Citizen	K-League	18	8	4	2	2	2	-		24	12
2010	Daejeon Citizen	K-League	10	3	1	1	2	1	-		14	5
2010	Ulsan Hyundai	K-League	17	6	1	0	1	0	-		19	6
2011	Ulsan Hyundai	K-League							-			
Total	Suwon Samsung Bluewings		23	0	3	0	5	0	-		31	0
Total	Busan I'Park		19	2	2	1	9	0	-		29	3
Total	Gwangju Sangmu		41	2	4	0	12	2	-		57	4
Total	Daejeon Citizen		28	11	5	3	4	3	-		37	17
Total	Ulsan Hyundai		17	6	1	0	1	0	-		19	6
Career total			118	21	14	4	31	5	-		163	30

== Honors ==
Ulsan Hyundai

- AFC Champions League (1): 2012
