= Kim Dong-wook (footballer) =

South Korean footballer (born 1989)

Personal information
- Full name: Kim Dong-wook
- Date of birth: August 29, 1989 (age 37)
- Place of birth: South Korea
- Height: 1.82 m (5 ft 11 1/2 in)
- Position: Forward

Team information
- Current team: Oita Trinita

Youth career
- Korea University

Senior career*
Years	Team	Apps	(Gls)
2009	Daejeon Citizen	2	(0)
2010–2012	Ulsan Hyundai	6	(0)
2013	Chungju Hummel	4	(0)
2014–2015	Hwaseong FC		
2016–	Oita Trinita		
- * Club domestic league appearances and goals as of 1 January 2014

Kim Da-bin (born August 29, 1989), also known as Kim Dong-wook, is a South Korean football player who plays for J3 League side Oita Trinita.
