= Han Dong-won =

South Korean footballer (born 1986)

Han Dong-Won
Personal information
- Full name: Han Dong-Won
- Date of birth: 6 April 1986 (age 40)
- Place of birth: Suwon, Gyeonggi, South Korea
- Height: 1.78 m (5 ft 10 in)
- Position: Forward

Senior career*
Years	Team	Apps	(Gls)
2002–2006	Anyang LG Cheetahs / FC Seoul	20	(2)
2007–2009	Seongnam Ilhwa Chunma	53	(11)
2010	Montedio Yamagata	3	(1)
2011–2012	Seongnam Ilhwa Chunma	0	(0)
2011	→ Daegu FC (loan)	12	(0)
2012	→ Suwon Bluewings (loan)	0	(0)
2012–	Gangwon FC	15	(1)
2013	→ FC Anyang (loan)	2	(0)
2014	→ Persijap Jepara	1	(0)
2014	→ Persijap Jepara	1	(0)

International career
2002–2003	South Korea U17	8	(15)
2004–2005	South Korea U20	12	(0)
2006–2008	South Korea U23	7	(4)
- * Club domestic league appearances and goals as of 18 December 2013

Han Dong-Won (Korean: 한동원; born 6 April 1986) is a South Korean footballer who plays for K League Challenge outfit FC Anyang on loan from Gangwon FC, (formerly FC Seoul and Seongnam Ilhwa Chunma).

On 22 March 2011, Han was loaned from Seongnam Ilhwa Chunma to Daegu FC for a one year. In late February 2012, he joined Suwon Bluewings on a season-long loan deal but rescinded his contract in July 2012.

On 31 July 2012, Han moved on free transfer to Gangwon FC.

== Club statistics ==
Club performance			League		Cup		League Cup		Continental		Total	
Season	Club	League	Apps	Goals	Apps	Goals	Apps	Goals	Apps	Goals	Apps	Goals
South Korea			League		KFA Cup		League Cup		Asia		Total	
2002	Anyang LG Cheetahs	K-League	0	0			1	0				
2003	Anyang LG Cheetahs	K-League	4	0	0	0	-		-		4	0
2004	FC Seoul	K-League	0	0	2	0	4	0	-		6	0
2005	FC Seoul	K-League	3	0	2	1	0	0	-		5	1
2006	FC Seoul	K-League	13	2	1	0	8	3	-		22	5
2007	Seongnam Ilhwa Chunma	K-League	14	1	1	0	1	0	4	0	20	1
2008	Seongnam Ilhwa Chunma	K-League	18	6	1	2	8	0	-		27	8
2009	Seongnam Ilhwa Chunma	K-League	21	4	1	1	5	3	-		27	8
Japan			League		Emperor's Cup		League Cup		Asia		Total	
2010	Montedio Yamagata	J1 League	3	1	1	0	2	0	-		6	1
South Korea			League		KFA Cup		League Cup		Asia		Total	
2011	Daegu FC	K-League	12	0	1	0	2	0	-		15	0
2012	Suwon Samsung Bluewings	K-League							-			
Total	South Korea		85	13	9	0	29	6	4	0	127	19
Total	Japan		3	1	1	0	2	0	-		6	1
Career total			88	14	10	0	31	6	4	0	133	20
