= Park Ji-yong =

South Korean footballer

Park Ji-Yong
Personal information
- Full name: Park Ji-Yong
- Date of birth: 28 May 1983 (age 43)
- Place of birth: Daejeon, South Korea
- Height: 1.82 m (6 ft 0 in)
- Position: Defender

Senior career*
Years	Team	Apps	(Gls)
2004–2010	Chunnam Dragons	46	(0)
2005–2006	→ Police FC (loan)		
2010	Jeonnam Dragons	3	(0)
2011	Gangwon FC	10	(0)
- * Club domestic league appearances and goals as of 00:08, 21 October 2023

- Park Ji-yong
- Hangul: 박지용
- Hanja: 朴志容
- RR: Bak Jiyong
- MR: Pak Chiyong

Park Ji-Yong (Korean: 박지용; born 28 May 1983) is a South Korean footballer.

He was arrested in just 1 year half on the charge connected with the match fixing allegations on 7 July 2011.

== Early life ==
Park was born in Daejeon.

== Career ==
Park played potentially his last match on the 28th of May 2011, a 0–0 draw against Gimcheon Sangmu.
