= Weslley (footballer, born April 1992) =

Brazilian footballer

Personal information
- Full name: Weslley Smith Alves Feitosa
- Date of birth: 21 April 1992 (age 34)
- Place of birth: Uruçuí, Piauí, Brazil
- Height: 1.80 m (5 ft 11 in)
- Position: Forward

Team information
- Current team: Jiangxi Beidamen
- Number: 8

Senior career*
| Years | Team | Apps | (Gls) |
| 2010 | EC Primavera | 14 | (11) |
| 2010–2014 | SC Corinthians | | |
| 2011 | → Flamengo (SP) (loan) | 7 | (2) |
| 2011 | → Chunnam Dragons (loan) | 24 | (4) |
| 2012 | → Gangwon FC (loan) | 36 | (9) |
| 2013 | → Chunnam Dragons (loan) | 23 | (5) |
| 2014 | Linense | 1 | (0) |
| 2015 | Busan IPark | 32 | (8) |
| 2016–2017 | Buriram United | 13 | (0) |
| 2016 | → Shonan Bellmare (loan) | 9 | (2) |
| 2017 | Incheon United FC | 28 | (2) |
| 2020 | River | 11 | (4) |
| 2021 | Sampaio Corrêa | 3 | (0) |
| 2021-2022 | America Futebol Clube (RN) | 14 | (1) |
| 2022-2024 | Jiangxi Beidamen | 16 | (5) |
- * Club domestic league appearances and goals as of 09 March 2019

Weslley Smith Alves Feitosa (born 21 April 1992), commonly known as Weslley Smith or simply Weslley, is a Brazilian footballer who last played for China League Two club Jiangxi Beidamen as a forward.
