= Lee Sang-don (footballer) =

South Korean footballer

Personal information
- Full name: Lee Sang-don (이상돈)
- Date of birth: August 12, 1985 (age 41)
- Place of birth: South Korea
- Height: 1.79 m (5 ft 10 in)
- Position: Midfielder

Team information
- Current team: Goyang Zaicro FC
- Number: 12

Senior career*
Years	Team	Apps	(Gls)
2008–2009	Ulsan Hyundai Horang-i	12	(0)
2010	Suwon Samsung Bluewings	2	(0)
2010–2014	Gangwon FC	48	(0)
2013–2014	→ Pocheon FC (loan)		
2015–	Goyang Zaicro FC	70	(1)
- * Club domestic league appearances and goals as of 1 December 2016

Lee Sang-don (born August 12, 1985) is a South Korean football player who currently plays for Goyang Hi FC. His younger brother Lee Sang-ho is also a footballer.

== Career statistics ==
As of 31 October 2011

Club performance			League		Cup		League Cup		Continental		Total	
Season	Club	League	Apps	Goals	Apps	Goals	Apps	Goals	Apps	Goals	Apps	Goals
Korea Republic			League		FA Cup		K-League Cup		Asia		Total	
2008	Ulsan Hyundai	K-League	5	0	0	0	3	0	-		8	0
2009	Ulsan Hyundai	K-League	7	0	1	0	1	0	1	0	10	0
2010	Suwon Bluewings	K-League	2	0	0	0	3	1	0	0	5	1
2010	Gangwon FC	K-League	16	0	0	0	0	0	-		16	0
2011	Gangwon FC	K-League	21	0	3	0	2	0	-		26	0
2012	Gangwon FC	K-League	0	0	0	0	-		-		0	0
Total			51	0	4	0	9	1	1	0	65	1
