= Lee Jae-hun (footballer) =

South Korean footballer

Personal information
- Full name: Lee Jae-hun
- Date of birth: 10 January 1990 (age 36)
- Place of birth: South Korea
- Height: 1.77 m (5 ft 9 1/2 in)
- Position: Defender

Team information
- Current team: Seoul E-Land
- Number: 33

Youth career
- 2005–2007: Bukyeong High School
- 2008–2011: Yonsei University

Senior career*
Years	Team	Apps	(Gls)
2012–2015	Gangwon FC	81	(0)
2016–	Seoul E-Land	11	(0)
2017–2019	→ Gyeongju Citizen (loan)		

International career
2005–2006	South Korea U17	10	(0)
2009	South Korea U20	1	(0)
- * Club domestic league appearances and goals as of 25 June 2019

Lee Jae-hun (Korean: 이재훈; born 10 January 1990) is a South Korean footballer who plays as a defender for Seoul E-Land.
