= Kim Ji-yong (pitcher) =

Korean baseball player

- Pitcher
- Born: February 20, 1988 (age 38); Seoul, South Korea
- Batted: Right Threw: Right

KBO debut
- June 24, 2010, for the LG Twins

Last KBO appearance
- September 24, 2022, for the Doosan Bears

KBO statistics
- Win–loss record: 14–14
- Earned run average: 4.84
- Strikeouts: 192
- Stats at Baseball Reference

Teams
- LG Twins (2010–2021); Doosan Bears (2022–2023)

Kim Ji-yong (Korean: 김지용; born February 20, 1988) is a South Korean former pitcher who played for the LG Twins and Doosan Bears of the KBO League from 2010 to 2023.
