= Nam Gwang-hyun =

South Korean footballer

Nam Gwang-Hyun
Personal information
- Full name: Nam Gwang-Hyun
- Date of birth: 25 August 1987 (age 39)
- Place of birth: South Korea
- Height: 1.79 m (5 ft 10 1/2 in)
- Position: Midfielder

Team information
- Current team: Daejeon KHNP
- Number: 25

Youth career
- Kyonggi University

Senior career*
Years	Team	Apps	(Gls)
2010	Chunnam Dragons	5	(1)
2011	Gangwon FC	0	(0)
2012	Suphanburi F.C.		
2012–	Daejeon KHNP		
- * Club domestic league appearances and goals as of 27 January 2012

- Nam Gwang-hyun
- Hangul: 남광현
- Hanja: 南侊炫
- RR: Nam Gwanghyeon
- MR: Nam Kwanghyŏn

Nam Gwang-Hyun (Korean: 남광현; born 25 August 1987) is a South Korean footballer who currently plays for Daejeon Korea Hydro & Nuclear Power FC.
