= Park Jung-hoon (footballer) =

South Korean footballer (born 1988)

Park Jung-Hoon
Personal information
- Full name: Park Jung-Hoon
- Date of birth: 28 June 1988 (age 38)
- Place of birth: South Korea
- Height: 1.80 m (5 ft 11 in)
- Position: Midfielder

Team information
- Current team: Goyang Hi FC
- Number: 11

Youth career
- 2004–2006: Paichai High School
- 2004–2005: → FC Metz (KFA Youth Project)
- 2007–2010: Korea University

Senior career*
Years	Team	Apps	(Gls)
2011	Jeonbuk Hyundai	0	(0)
2012–2013	Chunnam Dragons	0	(0)
2012	→ Gangwon FC (loan)	3	(1)
2013	→ Ulsan Mipo Dolphin (loan)	12	(0)
2014	Bucheon FC	7	(0)
2015–	Goyang Hi FC	53	(8)
- * Club domestic league appearances and goals as of 1 December 2016

Park Jung-Hoon (Korean: 박정훈; born 28 June 1988) is a South Korean footballer who plays as a midfielder for Goyang Hi FC in K League Challenge. Besides South Korea, he has played in France.
