= Kim Joon-beom (footballer, born 1986) =

South Korean footballer

Kim Joon-Beom
Personal information
- Full name: Kim Joon-Beom
- Date of birth: 23 June 1986 (age 40)
- Place of birth: South Korea
- Height: 1.72 m (5 ft 7 1/2 in)
- Position: Midfielder

Team information
- Current team: FC Gangneung
- Number: 16

Senior career*
Years	Team	Apps	(Gls)
2009–2011	Gangneung City	55	(6)
2012–2014	Gangwon FC	1	(0)
2012–2013	→ Gangneung City	0	(0)
2014–	Gangneung City	0	(0)
- * Club domestic league appearances and goals as of 12 July 2012

Kim Joon-Beom (Korean: 김준범; born 23 June 1986) is a South Korean footballer who plays as a midfielder for Gangneung City on loan from Gangwon FC in the K League Classic.
