= Park Tae-woong =

South Korean footballer

Park Tae-Woong
Personal information
- Full name: Park Tae-Woong
- Date of birth: 30 January 1988 (age 38)
- Place of birth: Gunsan, Jeonbuk, South Korea
- Height: 1.70 m (5 ft 7 in)
- Position: Midfielder

Team information
- Current team: Gyeongnam FC
- Number: 6

Youth career
- Soongsil University

Senior career*
Years	Team	Apps	(Gls)
2010	Gyeongnam FC	1	(0)
2011–2012	Gangwon FC	20	(0)
2012–2015	Suwon Samsung	8	(0)
2013–2015	→ Sangju Sangmu (army)	2	(0)
2016–	Gyeongnam FC	7	(0)
- * Club domestic league appearances and goals as of 1 December 2016

- Park Tae-woong
- Hangul: 박태웅
- Hanja: 朴泰雄
- RR: Bak Taeung
- MR: Pak T'aeung

Park Tae-Woong (Korean: 박태웅; born 30 January 1988) is a South Korean footballer who plays for Gyeongnam FC.

== Club career statistics ==
As of 5 November 2011

Club performance			League		Cup		League Cup		Total	
Season	Club	League	Apps	Goals	Apps	Goals	Apps	Goals	Apps	Goals
Korea Republic			League		FA Cup		K-League Cup		Total	
2010	Gyeongnam FC	K-League	1	0	0	0	1	0	2	0
2011	Gangwon FC	K-League	12	0	0	0	2	0	14	0
2012	Gangwon FC	K-League	8	0	1	0	-		9	0
Total			21	0	1	0	3	0	25	0
