= Lee Jung-woon =

South Korean footballer

Lee Jung-Woon
Personal information
- Full name: Lee Jung-Woon
- Date of birth: 5 May 1980 (age 46)
- Place of birth: Samcheok, Gangwon-do, South Korea
- Height: 1.70 m (5 ft 7 in)
- Position: Midfielder

Team information
- Current team: Gangneung FC
- Number: 7

Youth career
- 1999–2002: Sungkyunkwan University

Senior career*
Years	Team	Apps	(Gls)
2003–2005	Chunnam Dragons	24	(5)
2006–2008	Gangneung City FC	33	(3)
2010	Gangwon FC	1	(0)
2011	Gangneung City FC	11	(4)
2011–2012	Gangwon FC	11	(1)
2012–2013	→ Gangneung City	0	(0)
2014–	Gangneung FC	0	(0)
- * Club domestic league appearances and goals as of 12 July 2012

- Lee Jung-woon
- Hangul: 이정운
- Hanja: 李楨雲
- RR: I Jeongun
- MR: I Chŏngun

Lee Jung-Woon (born May 5, 1980) is a South Korean football player who plays for Gangneung City on loan from Gangwon FC in the K-League.

== Football career ==
=== Early career ===
He was born in Samcheok, Gangwon and grew up in Gangwon until adulthood. Lee attended Sungkyunkwan University in Seoul from 1999 to 2002. He lifted trophy as Most Valuable Player in the 2000 Autumn College League Tournament (Hangul: 2000년 전국추계대학축구연맹전).

=== K-League ===
After graduating from university, he joined K-League side Chunnam Dragons. Lee recorded 5 goals in 25 league games for three years. As 2005 season was ended, he became a free agent. He made trials in La Liga side Deportivo Alavés but it was failed and he returned to South Korea in 2006 summer.

=== Korea National League ===
When he returned to South Korea, K-League's registration deadline was ended. So he joined Korea National League side Gangneung City FC in his homeland. After three years in Gangneung, he left team to do military service for two years.

=== Return to K-League ===
In July 2010, as soon as his military service ended, he made tryout with Gangwon FC. On July 12, 2010, he joined Gangwon FC. On 24 July 2010, he made his first match in Gangwon against Jeonbuk in Gangneung by substitute. He moved back to Gangneung City FC after the 2010 season.

On 4 July 2011, he moved to Gangwon FC.

== Club career statistics ==
As of 12 July 2012

Club performance			League		Cup		League Cup		Total	
Season	Club	League	Apps	Goals	Apps	Goals	Apps	Goals	Apps	Goals
South Korea			League		KFA Cup		League Cup		Total	
2003	Chunnam Dragons	K-League	1	0	0	0	-		1	0
2004	Chunnam Dragons	K-League	4	1	1	0	4	0	9	1
2005	Chunnam Dragons	K-League	19	4	3	0	3	0	25	4
2006	Gangneung City	Korea National League	13	0	1	0	-		14	0
2007	Gangneung City	Korea National League	8	2	1	0	-		9	2
2008	Gangneung City	Korea National League	12	1	1	0	-		13	1
2010	Gangwon FC	K-League	1	0	0	0	0	0	1	0
2011	Gangneung City	Korea National League	11	4	1	1	-		12	5
2011	Gangwon FC	K-League	11	1	1	0	0	0	12	1
2012	Gangwon FC	K-League	0	0	2	0	-		2	0
Career total			80	13	11	1	7	0	98	14
