= Cristești =

Cristești may refer to several places:

- Cristești, Botoșani, a commune in Botoșani County, Romania
- Cristești, Iași, a commune in Iași County, Romania
- Cristești, Mureș, a commune in Mureș County, Romania
- Cristești, a village in Mogoș Commune, Alba County, Romania
- Cristești, a village in Hălmagiu Commune, Arad County, Romania
- Cristești, a village in Brăești Commune, Iași County, Romania
- Cristești, a village in Holboca Commune, Iași County, Romania
- Cristești, a village in Puiești Commune, Vaslui County, Romania
- Cristești, Nisporeni, a commune in Nisporeni district, Moldova

== See also ==
- Cristea (surname)
- Cristescu (surname)
- Cristian (disambiguation)
- Cristinești, a commune in Botoşani County, Romania
