= Cristian =

Cristian is the Romanian, Spanish and Italian form of the male given name Christian. In Romanian, it is also a surname.

Cristian may refer to:

== People ==
- Cristian (footballer, born 1994), Brazilian footballer
- Cristian Adomniței (born 1975), Romanian engineer and politician
- Cristian Agnelli (born 1985), Italian footballer
- Cristian Alberdi (born 1980), Spanish footballer
- Cristian Albu (born 1993), Romanian footballer
- Cristian Alessandrini (born 1985), Argentine footballer
- Cristian Alex (born 1993), Brazilian footballer
- Cristian Alexanda, Australian R&B singer
- Cristian Amarilla (born 1993), Argentine footballer
- Cristian Amigo (born 1963), American composer, guitarist, and sound designer
- Cristian Andreoni (born 1992), Italian footballer
- Cristian Andrés Campozano (born 1985), Argentine footballer
- Cristian Ansaldi (born 1986), Argentine footballer
- Cristián Arriagada (born 1981), Chilean actor
- Cristian Avram (born 1994), Moldovan footballer
- Cristian Baroni (born 1983), Brazilian footballer
- Cristian Berdeja (born 1981), Mexican race walker
- Cristian Bertuca (born 2006), Italian racing driver
- Cristian Bucchi (born 1977), Italian footballer
- Cristian Bușoi (born 1978), Romanian physician and politician
- Cristian S. Calude (born 1952), New Zealand-Romanian mathematician and computer scientist
- Cristian Castro (born 1974), Mexican pop singer who sometimes records as "Cristian"
- Cristian Chivu (born 1980), Romanian footballer
- Cristian Crusat (born 1983), Spanish-Dutch writer
- Cristian Daniel Ledesma (born 1982), Italian footballer
- Cristián de la Fuente (born 1974), Chilean film actor
- Cristian Dumitrescu (born 1955), Romanian politician
- Cristian Dumitru Popescu (born 1964), Romanian-American mathematician
- Cristian García Ramos (born 1981), Spanish footballer known as Cristian
- Cristian Gérard Alvaro Gonzáles, Indonesian footballer
- Cristian Guzmán (born 1978), Dominican professional baseball player
- Cristian Mella (born 1988), Chilean psychologist, public servant and politician
- Cristián Menchaca, Chilean politician
- Cristian Molinaro (born 1983), Italian footballer
- Cristian Muñoz (racewalker) (born 1981), Chilean race walker
- Cristian Neira, Chilean journalist and politician
- Cristian Nemescu (1979–2006), Romanian film director
- Cristian Pache (born 1998), Dominican professional baseball outfielder
- Cristian Panait (1973–2002), Romanian prosecutor
- Cristian Popescu (1959–1995), Romanian poet
- Cristian Popescu Piedone (born 1963), Romanian politician
- Cristian Riveros (born 1982), Paraguayan footballer
- Cristian Rodríguez (boxer) (born 1973), Argentine boxer
- Cristian Roque (born 1995), Brazilian footballer
- Cristian Sima (born 2007), Romanian footballer
- Cristian Stănescu (born 1951), Romanian politician
- Cristian Taraborrelli (born 1970), Italian opera director, set and costume designer
- Cristian Terheș (born 1978), Romanian politician
- Cristian Tudor Popescu (born 1956), Romanian journalist
- Cristián Undurraga (born 1954), Chilean architect
- Cristian Vasile (1908–1974), Romanian tango-romance singer
- Cristian Volpato (born 2003), Australian-Italian footballer
- Flaviu Cristian (1951-1999), Romanian-American computer scientist
- Jaqueline Cristian (born 1998), Romanian tennis player
