= Cristescu =

Cristescu is a Romanian surname. Notable people with it include:

- Constantin Cristescu, Romanian General
- Daniel Cristescu, Romanian football defender
- Eugen Cristescu, Romanian secret police head
- Gheorghe Cristescu, Romanian socialist
- Marian Cristescu, Romanian football midfielder
- Melania Cristescu, Romanian–Canadian biologist and ecologist
- Silvian Cristescu, Romanian former professional footballer
- Vintilǎ Cristescu, Romanian long-distance runner

== See also ==
- Cristian (disambiguation)
- Cristești (disambiguation)
- Cristea (surname)
