= 2022 K3 League =

K3 League
- Season: 2022
- Dates: 26 February – 29 October 2022
- Champions: Changwon City (1st title)
- Promoted: Cheonan City; Cheongju FC
- Relegated: Dangjin Citizen
- Matches: 240
- Goals: 546 (2.28 per match)
- Best player: Luan Costa
- Top goalscorer: Shin Young-jun (16 goals)

The 2022 K3 League was the third season of the K3 League as a semi-professional league in South Korea. Its regular season was held from 26 February to 29 October 2022.

Defending champions Gimpo FC became a professional club and joined the K League. Cheonan City and Cheongju FC were also going to join the K League in the next year.

The 16 participating teams played each other twice, and the bottom team advanced to the relegation play-off. The K3 League Championship which had been held in play-off format to decide champions before was not held since this year.

== Teams ==
=== Team changes ===
Promoted from K4 League

- Pocheon Citizen
- Siheung Citizen
- Dangjin Citizen

Promoted to K League 2

- Gimpo FC

Relegated to K4 League

- Pyeongtaek Citizen

=== Stadiums and locations ===
| Club | City | Stadium | Capacity |
|---|---|---|---|
| Busan Transportation Corporation | Busan | Busan Gudeok Stadium | 24,363 |
| Changwon City | Changwon | Changwon Football Center | 15,116 |
| Cheonan City | Cheonan | Cheonan Football Center | 15,500 |
| Cheongju FC | Cheongju | Cheongju Stadium | 17,264 |
| Daejeon Korail | Daejeon | Daejeon World Cup Stadium Practice Pitch | 17,371 |
| Dangjin Citizen | Dangjin | Dangjin Sports Complex | 11,718 |
| Gangneung Citizen | Gangneung | Gangneung Stadium | 33,000 |
| Gimhae FC | Gimhae | Gimhae Public Stadium | 25,000 |
| Gyeongju KHNP | Gyeongju | Gyeongju Civic Stadium | 12,199 |
| Hwaseong FC | Hwaseong | Hwaseong Stadium | 35,270 |
| FC Mokpo | Mokpo | Mokpo International Football Center | 5,952 |
| Paju Citizen | Paju | Paju Public Stadium | 23,000 |
| Pocheon Citizen | Pocheon | Pocheon Stadium | 7,000 |
| Siheung Citizen | Siheung | Jeongwang Sports Park | 1,500 |
| Ulsan Citizen | Ulsan | Ulsan Stadium | 19,471 |
| Yangju Citizen | Yangju | Godeok Artificial Turf Ground | 5,000 |

=== Personnel ===
| Club | Manager |
|---|---|
| Busan Transportation Corporation | (South Korea) Kim Gwi-hwa |
| Changwon City | (South Korea) Choi Kyeong-don |
| Cheonan City | (South Korea) Kim Tae-young |
| Cheongju FC | (South Korea) Choi Sang-hyeon |
| Daejeon Korail | (South Korea) Kim Seung-hee |
| Dangjin Citizen | (South Korea) Han Sang-min |
| Gangneung Citizen | (South Korea) Kim Do-keun |
| Gimhae FC | (South Korea) Yoon Sung-hyo |
| Gyeongju KHNP | (South Korea) Seo Bo-won |
| Hwaseong FC | (South Korea) Kang Chul |
| FC Mokpo | (South Korea) Jeong Hyun-ho |
| Paju Citizen | (South Korea) Lee Eun-no |
| Pocheon Citizen | (South Korea) Cho Man-geun |
| Siheung Citizen | (South Korea) Park Seung-soo |
| Ulsan Citizen | (South Korea) Yoon Kyung-sang |
| Yangju Citizen | (South Korea) Park Sung-bae |

=== Foreign players ===
| Club | Player 1 | Player 2 | Player 3 | AFC player | Former players |
|---|---|---|---|---|---|
| Changwon City | (Brazil) Luan Costa | | | | |
| Cheonan City | (Brazil) Bruno Mota | (Brazil) Juliano | (Brazil) Rodolfo | | |
| Cheongju FC | (Brazil) Denilson | (Brazil) Ruster Santos | (Brazil) Yan Victor | | |
| Gangneung Citizen | (Brazil) Cristian | (Brazil) Júnior Batista | | | |
| Hwaseong FC | (Brazil) Carlinhos | (Brazil) Julen Sandy | | | |
| Gimhae FC | (Japan) Masato Shimokawa | (Serbia) Marko Rajkovic | | | |
| Paju Citizen | (Angola) Samuel Pungi | (Brazil) Bruno Kairon | (Brazil) Matheus Medeiros | | |
| Ulsan Citizen | (South Sudan) Paul Puk Kun Pal | | | | |
| Yangju Citizen | (Brazil) Danyllo | | | | |

== League table ==
| Pos | Team | Pld | W | D | L | GF | GA | GD | Pts | Qualification |
|---|---|---|---|---|---|---|---|---|---|---|
| 1 | Changwon City (C) | 30 | 17 | 6 | 7 | 39 | 21 | +18 | 57 | |
| 2 | Paju Citizen | 30 | 15 | 11 | 4 | 43 | 29 | +14 | 56 | |
| 3 | Gyeongju KHNP | 30 | 15 | 8 | 7 | 44 | 26 | +18 | 53 | |
| 4 | Busan Transportation Corporation | 30 | 11 | 13 | 6 | 47 | 33 | +14 | 46 | |
| 5 | Siheung Citizen | 30 | 13 | 7 | 10 | 40 | 34 | +6 | 46 | |
| 6 | Hwaseong FC | 30 | 12 | 10 | 8 | 33 | 29 | +4 | 46 | |
| 7 | Gimhae FC | 30 | 12 | 9 | 9 | 33 | 26 | +7 | 45 | |
| 8 | Yangju Citizen | 30 | 12 | 5 | 13 | 30 | 29 | +1 | 41 | |
| 9 | Daejeon Korail | 30 | 12 | 5 | 13 | 28 | 36 | −8 | 41 | |
| 10 | Cheonan City (P) | 30 | 9 | 13 | 8 | 30 | 27 | +3 | 40 | Promotion to K League 2 (Note: Promoted after getting a license for K League 2.) |
| 11 | Pocheon Citizen | 30 | 10 | 9 | 11 | 40 | 36 | +4 | 39 | |
| 12 | Gangneung Citizen | 30 | 9 | 9 | 12 | 39 | 43 | −4 | 36 | |
| 13 | FC Mokpo | 30 | 9 | 4 | 17 | 24 | 45 | −21 | 31 | |
| 14 | Cheongju FC (P) | 30 | 7 | 9 | 14 | 21 | 41 | −20 | 30 | Promotion to K League 2 |
| 15 | Ulsan Citizen | 30 | 6 | 10 | 14 | 29 | 40 | −11 | 28 | |
| 16 | Dangjin Citizen (R) | 30 | 3 | 8 | 19 | 26 | 51 | −25 | 17 | Qualification for relegation play-off |

Source: Flashscore Soccerway
Rules for classification: 1) Points; 2) Goal difference; 3) Goals scored; 4) Wins
(C) Champions; (P) Promoted; (R) Relegated

== Results ==
| Home \ Away | BTC | CHA | CHC | CHE | DAN | DKO | GNE | GIH | GYE | HWA | MOK | PCI | POC | SIH | ULS | YJU |
|---|---|---|---|---|---|---|---|---|---|---|---|---|---|---|---|---|
| Busan Transportation Corporation | — | 0–1 | 1–1 | 2–0 | 3–0 | 4–3 | 1–1 | 0–0 | 0–1 | 2–2 | 2–3 | 0–0 | 1–1 | 2–1 | 3–2 | 2–1 |
| Changwon City | 1–1 | — | 2–0 | 2–0 | 2–1 | 0–0 | 2–0 | 2–0 | 0–2 | 0–0 | 3–0 | 0–1 | 2–1 | 3–0 | 1–0 | 0–1 |
| Cheonan City | 1–1 | 1–2 | — | 4–0 | 0–0 | 1–2 | 1–1 | 1–1 | 1–1 | 0–1 | 2–0 | 0–0 | 2–1 | 1–2 | 0–0 | 0–2 |
| Cheongju FC | 0–2 | 3–2 | 0–1 | — | 2–1 | 1–0 | 1–1 | 0–1 | 0–0 | 0–3 | 3–1 | 2–2 | 1–3 | 0–0 | 1–2 | 1–0 |
| Dangjin Citizen | 0–0 | 1–1 | 1–1 | 3–3 | — | 0–1 | 3–2 | 1–2 | 1–4 | 1–3 | 3–1 | 1–1 | 2–1 | 1–1 | 0–3 | 0–1 |
| Daejeon Korail | 0–3 | 1–0 | 0–0 | 0–0 | 3–1 | — | 0–3 | 1–0 | 0–2 | 1–0 | 0–1 | 1–1 | 2–4 | 0–2 | 2–1 | 2–0 |
| Gangneung Citizen | 3–1 | 1–2 | 2–3 | 0–0 | 0–0 | 2–1 | — | 0–0 | 1–3 | 0–3 | 4–1 | 1–2 | 1–3 | 1–0 | 2–1 | 2–1 |
| Gimhae FC | 0–0 | 0–2 | 0–2 | 2–0 | 3–1 | 1–0 | 1–1 | — | 1–2 | 0–0 | 3–1 | 1–2 | 2–1 | 3–0 | 2–1 | 1–1 |
| Gyeongju KHNP | 3–1 | 0–0 | 2–2 | 4–0 | 1–0 | 3–1 | 1–2 | 0–0 | — | 1–1 | 0–1 | 2–1 | 1–0 | 0–1 | 2–0 | 1–1 |
| Hwaseong FC | 1–1 | 2–1 | 2–0 | 1–0 | 2–1 | 1–2 | 1–0 | 1–3 | 2–2 | — | 1–0 | 1–1 | 1–2 | 0–1 | 0–0 | 1–0 |
| FC Mokpo | 1–6 | 1–2 | 0–0 | 2–0 | 1–0 | 0–1 | 2–3 | 0–1 | 3–1 | 0–1 | — | 0–0 | 1–0 | 0–2 | 0–0 | 1–0 |
| Paju Citizen | 1–1 | 2–0 | 1–2 | 0–0 | 2–1 | 2–1 | 2–1 | 2–1 | 2–1 | 3–0 | 1–0 | — | 2–1 | 2–1 | 1–3 | 0–1 |
| Pocheon Citizen | 2–3 | 0–0 | 1–0 | 1–2 | 1–0 | 2–0 | 1–1 | 0–0 | 0–1 | 1–1 | 2–0 | 2–2 | — | 1–1 | 1–1 | 1–0 |
| Siheung Citizen | 2–1 | 1–2 | 1–2 | 0–0 | 2–1 | 1–2 | 1–0 | 2–0 | 2–1 | 4–0 | 2–0 | 1–1 | 2–2 | — | 3–4 | 2–1 |
| Ulsan Citizen | 0–2 | 0–2 | 0–0 | 0–1 | 2–1 | 0–0 | 3–3 | 1–4 | 1–2 | 0–0 | 0–1 | 0–2 | 2–1 | 2–2 | — | 0–1 |
| Yangju Citizen | 1–1 | 1–2 | 0–1 | 1–0 | 2–0 | 0–1 | 2–0 | 1–0 | 1–0 | 2–1 | 2–2 | 3–4 | 2–3 | 1–0 | 0–0 | — |

Source: KFA Soccerway
Legend: Blue = home team win; Yellow = draw; Red = away team win.

== Relegation play-off ==
The relegation play-off (K4 League promotion play-offs final) was contested between the bottom team of K3 League and the winners of K4 League play-off (semi-final).

13 November 2022
14:00 (UTC+9)

| Dangjin Citizen | 0–2 | Chuncheon Citizen |

Dangjin Stadium, Dangjin

== Top scorers ==
| Rank | Player | Club | Goals |
|---|---|---|---|
| 1 | (South Korea) Shin Young-jun | Busan Transportation Corporation | 16 |
| 2 | (South Korea) Seo Dong-hyeok | Gyeongju KHNP | 14 |
| 3 | (South Korea) Kim Yeong-jun | Pocheon Citizen | 12 |
| 3 | (Brazil) Luan Costa | Changwon City | 12 |
| 5 | (Serbia) Marko Rajkovic | Gimhae FC | 10 |

== See also ==
- 2022 in South Korean football
- 2022 Korean FA Cup
