= Cristea =

Cristea is a common family name in Romania. Persons named Cristea include:

- Adrian Cristea, Romanian footballer
- Alexandru Cristea, Romanian composer
- Andreea Cristea, Romanian killed in the 2017 Westminster attack in London
- Andrei Cristea, Romanian footballer
- Călin Cristea, Romanian footballer
- Cătălina Cristea, Romanian tennis player
- Ludmila Cristea, Moldovan wrestler
- Miron Cristea, first Patriarch of the Romanian Orthodox Church
- Nicolae Cristea, one of two individuals
- Olga Cristea, Moldovan runner
- P. G. Cristea, Romanian racing driver

== See also ==
- Cristian (disambiguation)
- Cristești (disambiguation)
- Cristescu (surname)
