= 2022 in South Korean football =

Football in South Korea
- Season: 2022

Men's football
- K League 1: Ulsan Hyundai
- K League 2: Gwangju FC
- K3 League: Changwon City
- K4 League: Goyang KH
- Korean FA Cup: Jeonbuk Hyundai Motors

Women's football
- WK League: Incheon Hyundai Steel Red Angels

This article shows a summary of the 2022 football season in South Korea.

== National teams ==
=== FIFA World Cup ===
The South Korean team, led by manager Paulo Bento and captained by the reigning Premier League Golden Boot winner Son Heung-min, qualified for the World Cup as the second-placed team of the AFC qualifying group A. After a goalless draw against Uruguay and a narrow defeat against Ghana, South Korea defeated Portugal 2–1 in the final match of the group stage with a stoppage-time goal by Hwang Hee-chan. Uruguay defeated Ghana 2–0, which meant that South Korea advanced to the knockout stage for the first time since 2010 on virtue of scoring more goals than Uruguay, with the same number of points. In the round of 16, the team was eliminated after losing 4–1 to Brazil.

24 November Group H	Uruguay	0–0	South Korea	Al Rayyan, Qatar
16:00 UTC+3	Cáceres (yellow card) 57'	Report	Cho Gue-sung (yellow card) 88'	Stadium: Education City Stadium; Attendance: 41,663; Referee: Clément Turpin (France)

28 November Group H	South Korea	2–3	Ghana	Al Rayyan, Qatar
16:00 UTC+3	Jung Woo-young (yellow card) 27'; Cho Gue-sung 58', 61'; Kim Young-gwon (yellow card) 77'	Report	Amartey (yellow card) 21'; Salisu 24'; Kudus 34', 68'; Lamptey (yellow card) 73'	Stadium: Education City Stadium; Attendance: 43,983; Referee: Anthony Taylor (England)

2 December Group H	South Korea	2–1	Portugal	Al Rayyan, Qatar
18:00 UTC+3	Kim Young-gwon 27'; Lee Kang-in (yellow card) 36'; Hwang Hee-chan 90+1' (yellow card) 90+2'	Report	Horta 5'	Stadium: Education City Stadium; Attendance: 44,097; Referee: Facundo Tello (Argentina)

Group H table
Pos	Team	Pld	W	D	L	GF	GA	GD	Pts	Qualification
1	Portugal	3	2	0	1	6	4	+2	6	Advance to knockout stage
2	South Korea	3	1	1	1	4	4	0	4	Advance to knockout stage
3	Uruguay	3	1	1	1	2	2	0	4	
4	Ghana	3	1	0	2	5	7	–2	3	

5 December Round of 16	Brazil	4–1	South Korea	Doha, Qatar
22:00 UTC+3	Vinícius 7'; Neymar 13' (pen.); Richarlison 29'; Paquetá 36'	Report	Jung Woo-young (yellow card) 44'; Paik Seung-ho 76'	Stadium: Stadium 974; Attendance: 43,847; Referee: Clément Turpin (France)

=== FIFA World Cup qualification ===
27 January AFC third round, Group A	Lebanon	0–1	South Korea	Sidon, Lebanon
14:00 UTC+2		Report	Cho Gue-sung 45+1'	Stadium: Saida Municipal Stadium; Attendance: 5,400; Referee: Ahmed Al-Kaf (Oman)

1 February AFC third round, Group A	Syria	0–2	South Korea	Dubai, United Arab Emirates
18:00 UTC+4		Report	Kim Jin-su 53'; Kwon Chang-hoon 71'	Stadium: Rashid Stadium; Attendance: 310; Referee: Hiroyuki Kimura (Japan)

24 March AFC third round, Group A	South Korea	2–0	Iran	Seoul, South Korea
20:00 UTC+9	Son Heung-min 45+2'; Kim Young-gwon 62'	Report		Stadium: Seoul World Cup Stadium; Attendance: 64,375; Referee: Chris Beath (Australia)

29 March AFC third round, Group A	United Arab Emirates	1–0	South Korea	Dubai, United Arab Emirates
17:45 UTC+4	Al-Maazmi 54'	Report		Stadium: Al Maktoum Stadium; Referee: Ahmed Al-Kaf (Oman)

AFC third round, Group A table
Pos	Team	Pld	W	D	L	GF	GA	GD	Pts	Qualification
1	Iran	10	8	1	1	15	4	+11	25	Qualification for World Cup
2	South Korea	10	7	2	1	13	3	+10	23	Qualification for World Cup
3	United Arab Emirates	10	3	3	4	7	7	0	12	Qualification for AFC fourth round
4	Iraq	10	1	6	3	6	12	−6	9	
5	Syria	10	1	3	6	9	16	−7	6	
6	Lebanon	10	1	3	6	5	13	−8	6	

Source: FIFA, AFC
Rules for classification: Tiebreakers

=== EAFF Championship ===
20 July	China	0–3	South Korea	Toyota, Japan
19:00 UTC+9		Report	Zhu Chenjie 39' (o.g.); Kwon Chang-hoon 54'; Cho Gue-sung 80'	Stadium: Toyota Stadium; Attendance: 200; Referee: Akhrol Riskullaev (Uzbekistan)

24 July	South Korea	3–0	Hong Kong	Toyota, Japan
16:00 UTC+9	Kang Seong-jin 17', 86'; Hong Chul 74'	Report		Stadium: Toyota Stadium; Attendance: 4,335; Referee: Nazmi Nasaruddin (Malaysia)

27 July	Japan	3–0	South Korea	Toyota, Japan
19:20 UTC+9	Soma 49'; Sasaki 64'; Machino 72'	Report		Stadium: Toyota Stadium; Attendance: 14,117; Referee: Akhrol Riskullaev (Uzbekistan)

Pos	Team	Pld	W	D	L	GF	GA	GD	Pts
1	Japan (H, C)	3	2	1	0	9	0	+9	7
2	South Korea	3	2	0	1	6	3	+3	6
3	China	3	1	1	1	1	3	−2	4
4	Hong Kong	3	0	0	3	0	10	−10	0

Source: EAFF
(C) Champions; (H) Hosts

=== AFC U-23 Asian Cup ===
2 June Group C	South Korea	4–1	Malaysia	Tashkent, Uzbekistan
18:00 UTC+5	Lee Sang-min 31'; Kim Tae-hwan 48'; Cho Young-wook 88', 90+2'	Report	Ajmal 83'	Stadium: Lokomotiv Stadium; Attendance: 290; Referee: Saoud Al-Athbah (Qatar)

5 June Group C	Vietnam	1–1	South Korea	Tashkent, Uzbekistan
18:00 UTC+5	Vũ Tiến Long 83'	Report	Cho Young-wook 64'	Stadium: Lokomotiv Stadium; Attendance: 255; Referee: Ahmad Alali (Kuwait)

8 June Group C	South Korea	1–0	Thailand	Tashkent, Uzbekistan
18:00 UTC+5	Go Jae-hyun 35'	Report		Stadium: Pakhtakor Stadium; Attendance: 350; Referee: Salman Ahmad Falahi (Qatar)

Group C table
Pos	Team	Pld	W	D	L	GF	GA	GD	Pts	Qualification
1	South Korea	3	2	1	0	6	2	+4	7	Advance to knockout stage
2	Vietnam	3	1	2	0	5	3	+2	5	Advance to knockout stage
3	Thailand	3	1	1	1	5	3	+2	4	
4	Malaysia	3	0	0	3	1	9	−8	0	

Source: AFC
Rules for classification: Group stage tiebreakers

12 June Quarter-finals	South Korea	0–3	Japan	Tashkent, Uzbekistan
18:00 UTC+5		Live Report; Stats Report	Y. Suzuki 22', 80'; Hosoya 65'	Stadium: Pakhtakor Stadium; Attendance: 529; Referee: Hanna Hattab (Syria)

=== Friendlies ===
==== Senior team ====
15 January	Iceland	1–5	South Korea	Antalya, Turkey
14:00 UTC+3	Guðjohnsen 55'	Report	Cho Gue-sung 15'; Kwon Chang-hoon 27'; Paik Seung-ho 29'; Kim Jin-gyu 75'; Eom Ji-sung 85'	Stadium: Mardan Sports Complex; Attendance: 0 Referee: Ali Palabıyık (Turkey)

21 January	South Korea	4–0	Moldova	Antalya, Turkey
14:00 UTC+3	Kim Jin-gyu 20'; Paik Seung-ho 33'; Kwon Chang-hoon 48'; Cho Young-wook 90+3' (pen.)	Report		Stadium: Mardan Sports Complex; Referee: Abdulkadir Bitigen (Turkey)

2 June	South Korea	1–5	Brazil	Seoul, South Korea
20:00 UTC+9	Hwang 31'	Report	Richarlison 7'; Neymar 42' (pen.), 57' (pen.); Coutinho 80'; Gabriel Jesus 90+3'	Stadium: Seoul World Cup Stadium; Attendance: 64,872; Referee: Ryuji Sato (Japan)

6 June	South Korea	2–0	Chile	Daejeon, South Korea
20:00 UTC+9	Hwang Hee-chan 12'; Son Heung-min 90+1'	Report		Stadium: Daejeon World Cup Stadium; Attendance: 40,135; Referee: Ryuji Sato (Japan)

10 June	South Korea	2–2	Paraguay	Suwon, South Korea
20:00 UTC+9	Son Heung-min 66'; Jeong Woo-yeong 90+3'	Report	Almirón 23', 49'	Stadium: Suwon World Cup Stadium; Attendance: 40,228; Referee: Jérémie Pignard (France)

14 June	South Korea	4–1	Egypt	Seoul, South Korea
20:00 UTC+9	Hwang Ui-jo 16'; Kim Young-gwon 21'; Cho Gue-sung 85'; Kwon Chang-hoon 90+1'	Report	Mohamed 37'	Stadium: Seoul World Cup Stadium; Attendance: 59,712; Referee: Jérémie Pignard (France)

23 September	South Korea	2–2	Costa Rica	Goyang, South Korea
20:00 UTC+9	Hwang Hee-chan 28'; Son Heung-min 85'	Report	Bennette 41', 63'	Stadium: Goyang Stadium; Attendance: 37,581; Referee: Alex King (Australia)

27 September	South Korea	1–0	Cameroon	Seoul, South Korea
20:00 UTC+9	Son Heung-min 35'	Report		Stadium: Seoul World Cup Stadium; Attendance: 59,389; Referee: Alex King (Australia)

11 November	South Korea	1–0	Iceland	Hwaseong, South Korea
20:00 UTC+9	Song Min-kyu 33'	Report		Stadium: Hwaseong Stadium; Attendance: 15,274; Referee: Jumpei Iida (Japan)

==== Under-23 team ====
26 September	South Korea	1–1	Uzbekistan	Hwaseong, South Korea
20:00 UTC+9	Cho Hyun-taek 85'	Report	Ruslan Jiyanov 49'	Stadium: Hwaseong Stadium; Attendance: 5,124; Referee: Chae Sang-hyeop (South Korea)

17 November	United Arab Emirates	2–1	South Korea	Dubai, United Arab Emirates
19:30 UTC+4	Al-Maazmi 18' (pen.); Faraj Abdulla 59'	Report	Kang Hyun-muk 7'	Stadium: Emirates Stadium; Attendance: 0 Referee: Abdullah Suhail (United Arab Emirates)

20 November	United Arab Emirates	0–2	South Korea	Dubai, United Arab Emirates
19:30 UTC+4		Report	An Jae-jun 11'; Paik Sang-hoon 56'	Stadium: Emirates Stadium; Attendance: 0 Referee: Saif Al-Messabi (United Arab Emirates)

== Leagues ==
=== K League 1 ===
Pos	Team	Pld	W	D	L	GF	GA	GD	Pts	Qualification or relegation (Note: Teams played each other three times (33 matches), before the league was split into two groups, the top six and the bottom six.)
1	Ulsan Hyundai (C)	38	22	10	6	57	33	+24	76	Qualification for Champions League group stage
2	Jeonbuk Hyundai Motors	38	21	10	7	56	36	+20	73	Qualification for Champions League group stage
3	Pohang Steelers	38	16	12	10	52	41	+11	60	Qualification for Champions League group stage
4	Incheon United	38	13	15	10	46	42	+4	54	Qualification for Champions League play-off round
5	Jeju United	38	14	10	14	52	50	+2	52	
6	Gangwon FC	38	14	7	17	50	52	−2	49	
7	Suwon FC	38	13	9	16	56	63	−7	48	
8	Daegu FC	38	10	16	12	52	59	−7	46	
9	FC Seoul	38	11	13	14	43	47	−4	46	
10	Suwon Samsung Bluewings (O)	38	11	11	16	44	49	−5	44	Qualification for relegation play-offs
11	Gimcheon Sangmu (R)	38	8	14	16	45	48	−3	38	Qualification for relegation play-offs
12	Seongnam FC (R)	38	7	9	22	37	70	−33	30	Relegation to K League 2

Source: Soccerway
Rules for classification: 1) Points; 2) Goals scored; 3) Goal difference; 4) Wins; 5) Head-to-head points
(C) Champions; (O) Play-off winners; (R) Relegated

=== K League 2 ===
==== Regular season ====
Pos	Team	Pld	W	D	L	GF	GA	GD	Pts	Promotion or qualification
1	Gwangju FC (C, P)	40	25	11	4	68	32	+36	86	Promotion to K League 1
2	Daejeon Hana Citizen (O, P)	40	21	11	8	70	45	+25	74	Qualification for promotion play-offs final round
3	FC Anyang	40	19	12	9	52	41	+11	69	Qualification for promotion play-offs second round
4	Bucheon FC 1995	40	17	10	13	52	44	+8	61	Qualification for promotion play-offs first round
5	Gyeongnam FC	40	16	8	16	60	61	−1	56	Qualification for promotion play-offs first round
6	Chungnam Asan	40	13	13	14	39	44	−5	52	
7	Seoul E-Land	40	11	15	14	46	47	−1	48	
8	Gimpo FC	40	10	11	19	39	65	−26	41	
9	Ansan Greeners	40	8	13	19	49	67	−18	37	
10	Busan IPark	40	9	9	22	34	52	−18	36	
11	Jeonnam Dragons	40	6	17	17	47	58	−11	35	

Source: K League Soccerway
Rules for classification: 1) Points; 2) Goals scored; 3) Goal difference; 4) Wins; 5) Head-to-head points
(C) Champions; (O) Play-off winners; (P) Promoted

==== Promotion play-offs ====
First round
4	Bucheon FC 1995	2
5	Gyeongnam FC	3

Second round
3	FC Anyang	0
5	Gyeongnam FC	0

Final 1
FC Anyang	0	1	1
Suwon Samsung Bluewings (a.e.t.)	0	2	2
Final 2
Daejeon Hana Citizen	2	4	6
Gimcheon Sangmu	1	0	1

=== K3 League ===
Pos	Team	Pld	W	D	L	GF	GA	GD	Pts	Qualification
1	Changwon City (C)	30	17	6	7	39	21	+18	57	
2	Paju Citizen	30	15	11	4	43	29	+14	56	
3	Gyeongju KHNP	30	15	8	7	44	26	+18	53	
4	Busan Transportation Corporation	30	11	13	6	47	33	+14	46	
5	Siheung Citizen	30	13	7	10	40	34	+6	46	
6	Hwaseong FC	30	12	10	8	33	29	+4	46	
7	Gimhae FC	30	12	9	9	33	26	+7	45	
8	Yangju Citizen	30	12	5	13	30	29	+1	41	
9	Daejeon Korail	30	12	5	13	28	36	−8	41	
10	Cheonan City (P)	30	9	13	8	30	27	+3	40	Promotion to K League 2 (Note: Promoted after getting a license for K League 2.)
11	Pocheon Citizen	30	10	9	11	40	36	+4	39	
12	Gangneung Citizen	30	9	9	12	39	43	−4	36	
13	FC Mokpo	30	9	4	17	24	45	−21	31	
14	Cheongju FC (P)	30	7	9	14	21	41	−20	30	Promotion to K League 2
15	Ulsan Citizen	30	6	10	14	29	40	−11	28	
16	Dangjin Citizen (R)	30	3	8	19	26	51	−25	17	Qualification for relegation play-off

Source: Flashscore Soccerway
Rules for classification: 1) Points; 2) Goal difference; 3) Goals scored; 4) Wins
(C) Champions; (P) Promoted; (R) Relegated

=== K4 League ===
==== Regular season ====
Pos	Team	Pld	W	D	L	GF	GA	GD	Pts	Qualification
1	Goyang KH (Note: Dissolved after the end of the season.) (C)	32	22	2	8	71	40	+31	68	
2	Yangpyeong FC (P)	32	19	7	6	49	30	+19	64	Promotion to K3 League
3	Chuncheon Citizen (O, P)	32	18	7	7	55	31	+24	61	Qualification for promotion play-offs
4	Pyeongchang United	32	17	4	11	47	40	+7	55	Qualification for promotion play-offs
5	Daejeon Hana Citizen B	32	16	3	13	60	56	+4	51	
6	Gangwon FC B	32	15	5	12	49	32	+17	50	
7	Seoul Nowon United	32	15	4	13	56	45	+11	49	
8	Geoje Citizen	32	13	7	12	44	45	−1	46	
9	Jeonju Citizen	32	13	7	12	53	55	−2	46	
10	Jeonbuk Hyundai Motors B	32	13	6	13	56	52	+4	45	
11	Jinju Citizen	32	12	7	13	42	47	−5	43	
12	Daegu FC B	32	9	10	13	42	44	−2	37	
13	Seoul Jungnang	32	11	4	17	38	46	−8	37	
14	Pyeongtaek Citizen	32	9	7	16	42	54	−12	34	
15	Chungju Citizen	32	9	2	21	33	65	−32	29	
16	Yeoju FC	32	8	3	21	36	57	−21	27	
17	FC Namdong	32	7	5	20	29	69	−40	26	Withdrawal (Note: Dissolved with 7 matches left.)

Source: Soccerway JoinKFA
Rules for classification: 1) Points; 2) Goal difference; 3) Head-to-head points; 4) Goals scored; 5) Wins
(C) Champions; (O) Play-off winners; (P) Promoted

==== Promotion play-offs ====
First round			Final
			K3	Dangjin Citizen	0
3	Chuncheon Citizen	0	K4	Chuncheon Citizen	2
4	Pyeongchang United	0

=== WK League ===
==== Regular season ====
Pos	Team	Pld	W	D	L	GF	GA	GD	Pts	Qualification
1	Incheon Hyundai Steel Red Angels	21	16	4	1	44	13	+31	52	Qualification for play-offs final
2	Gyeongju KHNP	21	15	4	2	46	21	+25	49	Qualification for play-offs semi-final
3	Suwon FC	21	10	7	4	39	27	+12	37	Qualification for play-offs semi-final
4	Hwacheon KSPO	21	9	7	5	36	25	+11	34	
5	Seoul WFC	21	6	4	11	32	43	−11	22	
6	Boeun Sangmu	21	4	4	13	16	35	−19	16	
7	Changnyeong WFC	21	5	1	15	20	42	−22	16	
8	Sejong Sportstoto	21	2	3	16	18	45	−27	9	

Source: Soccerway

==== Championship play-offs ====
Semi-final			Final
			1	Incheon Hyundai Steel Red Angels	0	2	2
2	Gyeongju KHNP	4		Gyeongju KHNP	0	0	0
3	Suwon FC	3

==== Final table ====
Pos	Team	Qualification
1	Incheon Hyundai Steel Red Angels (C)	Qualification for AFC Club Championship
2	Gyeongju KHNP	
3	Suwon FC	

Source: RSSSF
(C) Champion

== Domestic cups ==
=== Korean FA Cup ===
Round of 16 (Fourth round)
Jeonbuk Hyundai Motors	1
Ulsan Citizen	0
Suwon Samsung Bluewings	2
Gangwon FC	0
Ulsan Hyundai	2
Gyeongnam FC	0
Bucheon FC 1995	2
Gwangju FC	1
FC Seoul	3
Jeju United	1
Busan Transportation Corporation (p)	2 (5)
Jeonnam Dragons	2 (4)
Daegu FC (p)	3 (5)
Daejeon Korail	3 (4)
Pohang Steelers	2
Seongnam FC	1

Quarter-finals (Fifth round)
Jeonbuk Hyundai Motors	3
Suwon Samsung Bluewings	0
Ulsan Hyundai (p)	1 (6)
Bucheon FC 1995	1 (5)
FC Seoul	3
Busan Transportation Corporation	0
Daegu FC	3
Pohang Steelers	2

Semi-finals (Sixth round)
Jeonbuk Hyundai Motors (a.e.t.)	2
Ulsan Hyundai	1
FC Seoul (a.e.t.)	1
Daegu FC	0

Final (Seventh round)
Jeonbuk Hyundai Motors	2	3	5
FC Seoul	2	1	3

== International cups ==
=== AFC Champions League ===
Team	Result	Round	Aggregate	Score	Opponent
Daegu FC	Round of 16	Qualifying play-offs	1–1 (3–2 p)	1–1 (a.e.t.)	(Thailand) Buriram United
Daegu FC	Round of 16	Group F	Winners	7–0	(China) Shandong Taishan
Daegu FC	Round of 16	Group F	Winners	4–0	(China) Shandong Taishan
Daegu FC	Round of 16	Group F	Winners	0–3	(Singapore) Lion City Sailors
Daegu FC	Round of 16	Group F	Winners	2–1	(Singapore) Lion City Sailors
Daegu FC	Round of 16	Group F	Winners	1–0	(Japan) Urawa Red Diamonds
Daegu FC	Round of 16	Group F	Winners	0–0	(Japan) Urawa Red Diamonds
Daegu FC	Round of 16	Round of 16	1–2	1–2 (a.e.t.)	(South Korea) Jeonbuk Hyundai Motors
Jeonbuk Hyundai Motors	Semi-finals	Group H	Runners-up	0–0	(Australia) Sydney FC
Jeonbuk Hyundai Motors	Semi-finals	Group H	Runners-up	3–2	(Australia) Sydney FC
Jeonbuk Hyundai Motors	Semi-finals	Group H	Runners-up	1–0	(Japan) Yokohama F. Marinos
Jeonbuk Hyundai Motors	Semi-finals	Group H	Runners-up	1–1	(Japan) Yokohama F. Marinos
Jeonbuk Hyundai Motors	Semi-finals	Group H	Runners-up	1–0	(Vietnam) Hoang Anh Gia Lai
Jeonbuk Hyundai Motors	Semi-finals	Group H	Runners-up	1–1	(Vietnam) Hoang Anh Gia Lai
Jeonbuk Hyundai Motors	Semi-finals	Round of 16	2–1	2–1 (a.e.t.)	(South Korea) Daegu FC
Jeonbuk Hyundai Motors	Semi-finals	Quarter-finals	3–1	3–1 (a.e.t.)	(Japan) Vissel Kobe
Jeonbuk Hyundai Motors	Semi-finals	Semi-finals	2–2 (1–3 p)	2–2 (a.e.t.)	(Japan) Urawa Red Diamonds
Jeonnam Dragons	Group stage	Group G	Third place	1–0	(Philippines) United City
Jeonnam Dragons	Group stage	Group G	Third place	2–0	(Philippines) United City
Jeonnam Dragons	Group stage	Group G	Third place	0–2	(Thailand) BG Pathum United
Jeonnam Dragons	Group stage	Group G	Third place	0–0	(Thailand) BG Pathum United
Jeonnam Dragons	Group stage	Group G	Third place	1–2	(Australia) Melbourne City
Jeonnam Dragons	Group stage	Group G	Third place	1–1	(Australia) Melbourne City
Ulsan Hyundai	Group stage	Qualifying play-offs	3–0	3–0	(Thailand) Port
Ulsan Hyundai	Group stage	Group I	Third place	1–1	(Japan) Kawasaki Frontale
Ulsan Hyundai	Group stage	Group I	Third place	3–2	(Japan) Kawasaki Frontale
Ulsan Hyundai	Group stage	Group I	Third place	1–2	(Malaysia) Johor Darul Ta'zim
Ulsan Hyundai	Group stage	Group I	Third place	1–2	(Malaysia) Johor Darul Ta'zim
Ulsan Hyundai	Group stage	Group I	Third place	3–0	(China) Guangzhou
Ulsan Hyundai	Group stage	Group I	Third place	5–0	(China) Guangzhou

== See also ==
- Football in South Korea
