= Jae-hyun =

- Hangul: 재현
- RR: Jaehyeon
- MR: Chaehyŏn

Jae-hyun, also spelled Jae-hyeon, is a Korean given name.

== Entertainers ==
- Ahn Jae-hyun (born 1987), South Korean actor
- Bong Jae-hyun (born 1999), South Korean singer and actor, member of boy band Golden Child
- Cho Jae-hyun (born 1965), South Korean actor
- Jaehyun (born Jeong Jae-hyun, 1997), South Korean singer, member of boy band NCT
- Kim Jae-hyun (born 1994), South Korean singer, member of boy band N.Flying
- Myung Jae-hyun (born 2003), leader and member of BoyNextDoor

== Sportspeople ==
- Jo Jae-hyeon (cyclist) (born 1937), South Korean cyclist
- Park Jae-hyun (footballer) (born 1980), South Korean football player
- Kim Jae-hyeon (born 2002), South Korean badminton player
- Kim Jae-hyun (footballer) (born 1987) South Korean footballer
- Yong Jae-hyun (born 1988), South Korean football player
- Choi Jae-hyeon (born 1994), South Korean football player
- An Jae-hyun (born 1999), South Korean table tennis player
- Go Jae-hyun (born 1999), South Korean football player

== Other ==
- Daewon (born Moon Jae-hyeon, 1936), South Korean Buddhist master
- Hyun Jae-hyun (born 1949), South Korean businessman
- Lee Jay-hyun (born 1960), South Korean businessman
- Jang Jae-hyun (born 1981), South Korean film director and screenwriter
- HuHi (born Choi Jae-hyun, 1995), South Korean League of Legends player

== See also ==
- List of Korean given names
