= FC Gangneung =

- Full name: Football Club Gangneung; FC 강릉
- Short name: FCGN
- Founded: 1999; 27 years ago as Gangneung Citizen
- Ground: Gangneung Stadium
- Capacity: 22,333
- Owner: Kim Han-Geun (Mayor)
- Chairman: Kim Nam-Sik
- Manager: Kim Do-keun
- Coach: Bang Ho-Jin
- League: K3 League
- 2025: 11th of 15
- Website: http://www.gn.go.kr/soccer/
Home colours	Away colours

FC Gangneung (Korean: FC 강릉), formerly Gangneung Citizen Football Club (Korean: 강릉 시민 축구단) is a South Korean Association football club based in the city of Gangneung and currently play in the K3 League, the third tier of South Korean football. In 2019, they became the final champions of the Korea National League before it was integrated into the K3 League.

== History ==
Gangneung Citizen was founded in 1999.

On 8 November 2025, at the last home game of 2025 season, Gangneung Citizen announce official change name to FC Gangneung starting from 2026 season.

== Current team squad ==
=== 2024 season squad ===
As of 2 March 2024

Note: Flags indicate national team as defined under FIFA eligibility rules; some limited exceptions apply. Players may hold more than one non-FIFA nationality.

No.	Pos.	Nation	Player
1	GK	KOR	Hwang Han-jun
2	DF	KOR	Kim Yoo-min
4	DF	KOR	Kwon Young-ho
5	DF	KOR	Kang Sung-hwa
6	DF	KOR	Ji Byeong-woo
7	FW	BRA	Elias
8	DF	KOR	Gwon Seong-hyeon
9	FW	KOR	Kim Yeong-wook
10	MF	BRA	Careca
11	FW	KOR	Kim Jeong-su
12	DF	KOR	Ye-ll Han
13	GK	KOR	Kim Min-kyu
14	MF	KOR	Park Han-gyeol
15	DF	KOR	Yang Si-hyeok
16	MF	KOR	Cho Jae-hyuk
17	MF	KOR	Kwon Tae-young
18	MF	KOR	Gyu-jin Han
19	MF	KOR	Kang Yong-seok
20	FW	KOR	Jang Han-young
22	DF	KOR	Park Sun-ju

No.	Pos.	Nation	Player
23	DF	KOR	Hwang Soon-yong
26	MF	BRA	Virgilio
27	MF	KOR	Jeong-min Son
28	FW	KOR	Myung Kyung-rok
29	FW	KOR	Lim Dong-hyun
30	MF	KOR	Yu Do-yeon
31	GK	KOR	Sin Jae-hu
33	MF	KOR	Baek Seung-woo
39	FW	KOR	Kim Jin-uk
40	MF	KOR	Kim Jeong-hwan
44	DF	KOR	Jeon Woo-ram
47	FW	KOR	Yoon Tae-hyeon
66	DF	KOR	Kim Jin-gu
70	FW	KOR	Kim Tae-ho
72	DF	KOR	Hong Seung-gi
77	FW	BRA	Cristian Machado
88	MF	KOR	Han Sang-wook
94	MF	KOR	Choi Jae-hyeon
99	FW	KOR	Choi Jin-woo

== Honours ==
=== Domestic competitions ===
==== League ====
- National League
  - Winners (2): 2009, 2019
  - Runners-up (1): 2004

==== Cups ====
- National League Championship
  - Runners-up (1): 2014
- National Sports Festival
  - Gold medal (2): 2007, 2012
  - Silver medal (1): 2003
- President's Cup
  - Winners (1): 2009

== Statistics ==
Season	Korea National League / K3 League											Korean FA Cup	League Cup	Top scorer (League goals)	Manager
Season	Stage	Teams	P	W	D	L	GF	GA	GD	Pts	Position	Korean FA Cup	League Cup	Top scorer (League goals)	Manager
1999	No League											Round 1	None	No League	(South Korea) Park Mun-Young
2000	No League											Round of 16	None	No League	(South Korea) Park Mun-Young
2001	No League											Round of 16	None	No League	(South Korea) Park Mun-Young
2002	No League											Round of 16	None	No League	(South Korea) Park Mun-Young
2003	First Stage	10	9	2	4	3	12	15	−3	10	8th	did not qualify	None	(South Korea) Ahn Hong-Min (4)	(South Korea) Kim Kyung-Beom
2003	Second Stage	10	9	2	2	5	9	12	−3	8	8th	did not qualify	None	(South Korea) Ahn Hong-Min (4)	(South Korea) Kim Kyung-Beom
2004	First Stage	10	9	2	3	4	9	10	−1	9	6th	Round 1	Group Round	(South Korea) Kim Jae-Cheon (8)	(South Korea) Kim Kyung-Beom
2004	Second Stage	10	9	6	2	1	11	8	+3	20	1st	Round 1	Group Round	(South Korea) Kim Jae-Cheon (8)	(South Korea) Kim Kyung-Beom
2004	Playoff	2	2	0	0	2	1	4	−3	0	Runner-up	Round 1	Group Round	(South Korea) Kim Jae-Cheon (8)	(South Korea) Kim Kyung-Beom
2005	First Stage	11	10	5	2	3	13	11	+2	17	4th	Round 1	Group Round	(South Korea) Ha Sung-Ryong (6)	(South Korea) Kim Kyung-Beom
2005	Second Stage	11	10	2	3	5	7	12	−5	9	9th	Round 1	Group Round	(South Korea) Ha Sung-Ryong (6)	(South Korea) Kim Kyung-Beom
2006	First Stage	11	10	1	1	8	5	21	−16	4	11th	Round 1	did not enter	(South Korea) Na Il-Kyun (4)	(South Korea) Kim Kyung-Beom (2006.1~5) (South Korea) Ahn Hong-Min (interim) (South Korea) Park Mun-Young (2006.8~)
2006	Second Stage	11	10	4	4	2	14	11	+3	16	5th	Round 1	did not enter	(South Korea) Na Il-Kyun (4)	(South Korea) Kim Kyung-Beom (2006.1~5) (South Korea) Ahn Hong-Min (interim) (South Korea) Park Mun-Young (2006.8~)
2007	First Stage	12	11	8	1	2	19	9	+10	25	2nd	Round 1	Quarter-finals	(South Korea) Lim Ho (14)	(South Korea) Park Mun-young
2007	Second Stage	12	11	5	2	4	21	15	+6	17	4th	Round 1	Quarter-finals	(South Korea) Lim Ho (14)	(South Korea) Park Mun-young
2008	First Stage	14	13	7	3	3	22	18	+4	24	4th	Round 1	Semi-finals	(South Korea) Kim Min-Gu (13)	(South Korea) Park Mun-young
2008	Second Stage	14	13	7	4	2	20	11	+9	25	2nd	Round 1	Semi-finals	(South Korea) Kim Min-Gu (13)	(South Korea) Park Mun-young
2008	Playoff	4	1	0	0	1	0	3	−3	0	Semi-finals	Round 1	Semi-finals	(South Korea) Kim Min-Gu (13)	(South Korea) Park Mun-young
2009	First Stage	14	13	6	4	3	21	15	+6	22	5th	Round 1	Quarter-finals	(South Korea) Ko Min-Ki (14)	(South Korea) Park Mun-young
2009	Second Stage	13	12	7	3	2	20	15	+5	24	3rd	Round 1	Quarter-finals	(South Korea) Ko Min-Ki (14)	(South Korea) Park Mun-young
2009	Playoff	4	3	3	0	0	7	3	+4	9	Champion	Round 1	Quarter-finals	(South Korea) Ko Min-Ki (14)	(South Korea) Park Mun-young
2010	First Stage	15	14	6	3	5	19	19	0	21	8th	Round of 16	Semi-finals	(South Korea) Lee Sung-Min (10)	(South Korea) Park Mun-young
2010	Second Stage	15	14	9	3	2	28	14	+14	30	1st	Round of 16	Semi-finals	(South Korea) Lee Sung-Min (10)	(South Korea) Park Mun-young
2010	Playoff	4	1	0	0	1	0	3	−3	0	Semi-finals	Round of 16	Semi-finals	(South Korea) Lee Sung-Min (10)	(South Korea) Park Mun-young
2011	Group Stage	14	26	12	10	4	40	25	+15	46	3rd	Round of 32	Quarter-finals	(South Korea) Chang Hyuk-Jin (5)	(South Korea) Park Mun-young
2011	Playoff	6	2	1	0	1	4	5	−1	3	Second Round	Round of 32	Quarter-finals	(South Korea) Chang Hyuk-Jin (5)	(South Korea) Park Mun-young
2012	Group Stage	14	26	14	5	7	32	21	+11	47	3rd	Round of 32	Quarter-finals	(South Korea) Lee Dong-Hyun (7)	(South Korea) Park Mun-young
2012	Playoff	6	0	1	0	0	0	0	0	1	First Round	Round of 32	Quarter-finals	(South Korea) Lee Dong-Hyun (7)	(South Korea) Park Mun-young
2013	Group Stage	10	27	8	9	10	33	36	-3	33	8th	Round of 32	Semifinals		(South Korea) Park Mun-young
2013	Playoff	0	0	0	0	0	0	0	0	0	First Round	Round of 32	Semifinals		(South Korea) Park Mun-young
2014	Group Stage	10	27	10	11	6	41	33	+8	41	4th	Quarterfinals	Runner-up		(South Korea) Oh Se-eung
2014	Playoff	4	0	1	0	0	3	6	-3	0	First Round	Quarterfinals	Runner-up		(South Korea) Oh Se-eung
2015	Group Stage	10	27	5	12	10	20	29	-29	27	9th	Third Round	Group Round		(South Korea) Oh Se-eung
2015	Playoff	0	0	0	0	0	0	0	0	0		Third Round	Group Round		(South Korea) Oh Se-eung
2016	Group Stage	10	27	16	8	3	33	17	+16	56	1st	Round of 32	Group Round		(South Korea) Oh Se-eung
2016	Playoff	0	0	0	0	0	0	0	0	0		Round of 32	Group Round		(South Korea) Oh Se-eung
2017	Group Stage	8	28	6	8	14	35	47	-12	26	7th	Round of 32	Group Round		(South Korea) Oh Se-eung
2017	Playoff	0	0	0	0	0	0	0	0	0	First Round	Round of 32	Group Round		(South Korea) Oh Se-eung
2018	Group Stage	8	28	10	7	11	35	30	+5	37	4th	Round of 32	Group Round		(South Korea) Oh Se-eung
2018	Playoff	0	0	0	0	0	0	0	0	0	First round	Round of 32	Group Round		(South Korea) Oh Se-eung
2019	Group Stage	8	28	19	4	5	50	26	+24	61	1st	Round of 32	Quarter-finals		(South Korea) Oh Se-eung
2019	Playoff	3	1	1	0	0	2	0	+2	3	Champion	Round of 32	Quarter-finals		(South Korea) Oh Se-eung
2020	Regular Season	16	22	13	3	6	30	15	+15	42	3rd	Round of 32	None	(South Korea) Ha Tae-goon (5)	(South Korea) Oh Se-eung
2020	Playoff	3	1	0	0	1	0	0	0	0	3rd	Round of 32	None	(South Korea) Ha Tae-goon (5)	(South Korea) Oh Se-eung
2021	Regular Season	15	28	4	8	16	23	42	-19	20	13th	Second round	None	(South Korea) Jeon Seong-soo (4)	(South Korea) Oh Se-eung
2022	Regular Season	16	30	9	9	12	39	43	-4	36	12th	Second round	None	(Brazil) Júnior Batista (6)	(South Korea) Kim Do-keun
2023	Regular Season	15	28	8	8	12	27	35	-8	32	12th	Second round	None	(South Korea) Kang Yong-seok (6)	(South Korea) Kim Do-keun
2024	Regular Season	16	30	10	9	11	34	41	-7	39	9th	Second round	None	(South Korea) Kwon Tae-young (6)	(South Korea) Kim Do-keun
2025	Regular Season	15	28	8	7	13	38	45	-7	31	11th	Third round	None	(South Korea) Cho Gun-kyu (8)	(South Korea) Kim Do-keun
2026	Regular Season	14	26	0	0	0	0	0	+0	0	TBD		None		(South Korea) Kim Do-keun

== See also ==
- List of football clubs in South Korea
