= Seven Solutions =

Spanish technology company

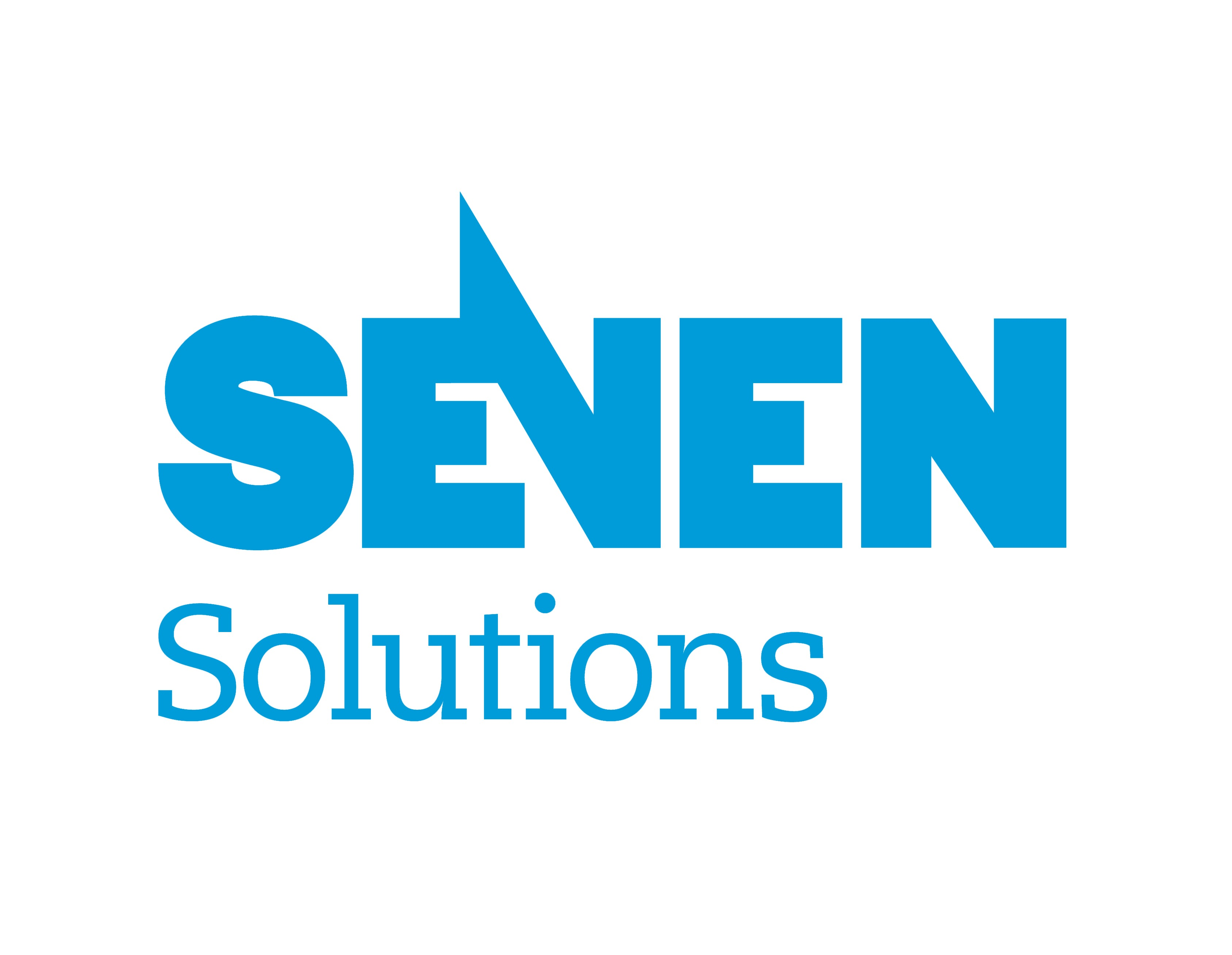
- Industry: Computer hardware; Electronics
- Founded: 2005 in Granada, Spain
- Headquarters: Granada, Andalusia, Spain
- Parent: Safran
- Website: www.sevensols.com

Seven Solutions was a Spanish hardware technology company headquartered in Granada, Spain, that developed and manufactured the first network switch for the open-source White Rabbit Project. Seven Solutions was involved with the design, manufacture, testing and support of White Rabbit switching equipment.

This project was financed by The government of Spain and CERN. Through this project Seven Solutions demonstrated a high performance enhanced PTP switch with sub-ns accuracy.

Seven Solutions was acquired by Orolia in 2021, which was then in turn acquired by Safran.
