= Choi Jae-hyeon =

South Korean footballer (born 1994)

Personal information
- Full name: Choi Jae-hyeon
- Date of birth: 20 April 1994 (age 32)
- Place of birth: South Korea
- Height: 1.84 m (6 ft 1/2 in)
- Position: Midfielder

Team information
- Current team: Gangneung Citizen FC
- Number: 94

Youth career
- 2014–2016: Kwangwoon University

Senior career*
Years	Team	Apps	(Gls)
2017–2020	Jeonnam Dragons	67	(11)
2020–2024	Daejeon Hana Citizen	9	(0)
2024–	Gangneung Citizen FC	11	(1)
- * Club domestic league appearances and goals as of 06 October 2024

Choi Jae-hyeon (Korean: 최재현; born 20 April 1994) is a South Korean footballer who plays as midfielder for Daejeon Hana Citizen.

== Career ==
Choi played college football for Kwangwoon University.

Choi joined K League 1 side Jeonnam Dragons in January 2017. He made a goal and an assist in his debut game on 15 April 2017.
