= Cristești, Nisporeni =

Cristești
- Village
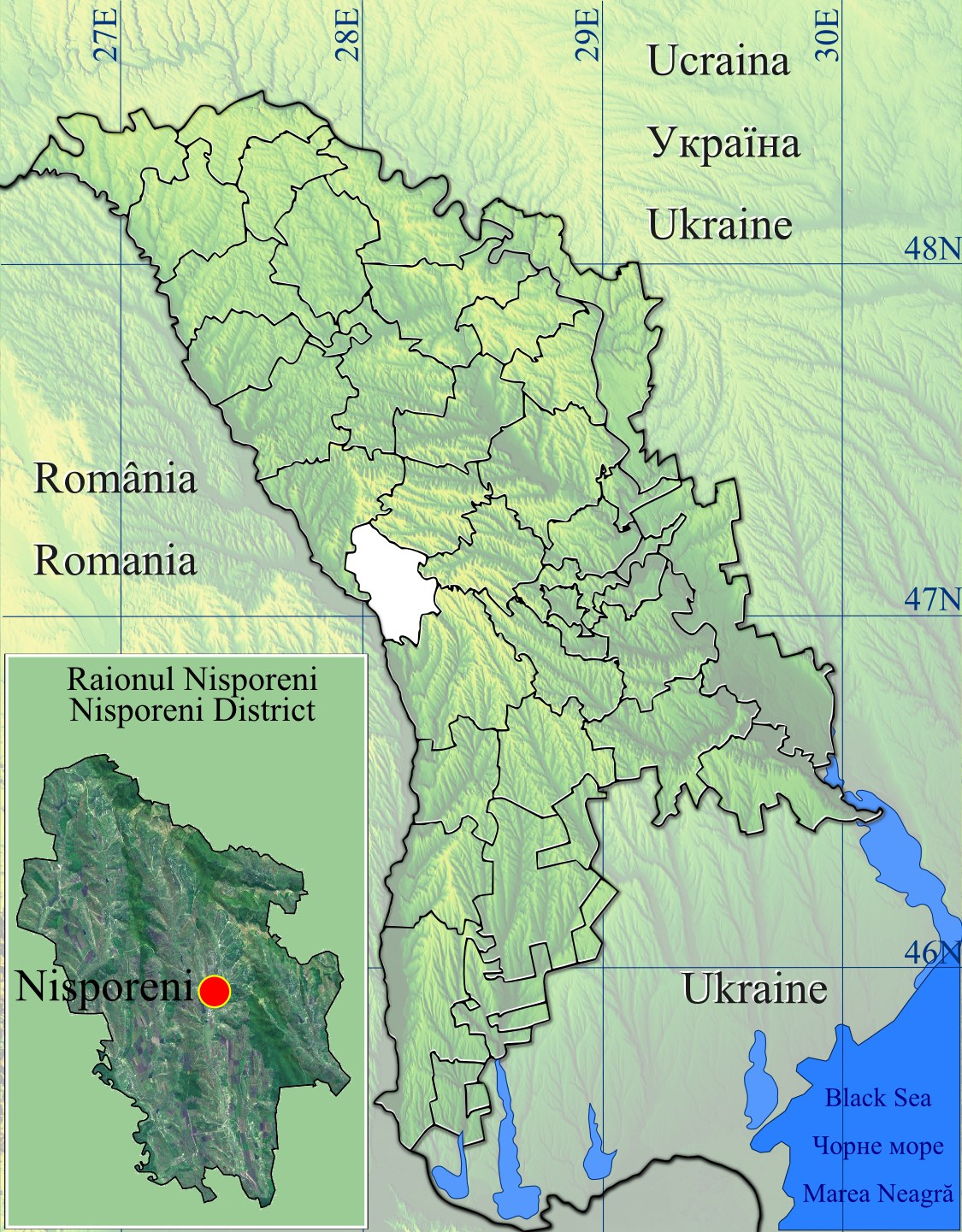
- Location within Nisporeni
- Coordinates: 47°3′18″N 28°17′10″E
- Country: Moldova

Government
  - Mayor: Alexei Secrieru (PDM)
- Elevation: 158 m (518 ft)

Population (2014 census)
  - Total: 1,057
- Time zone: UTC+2 (EET)
  - Summer (DST): UTC+3 (EEST)
- Postal code: MD-6424

Cristești is a village in Nisporeni District, Moldova.
