= Cristești, Mureș =

Cristești Maroskeresztúr
- Commune
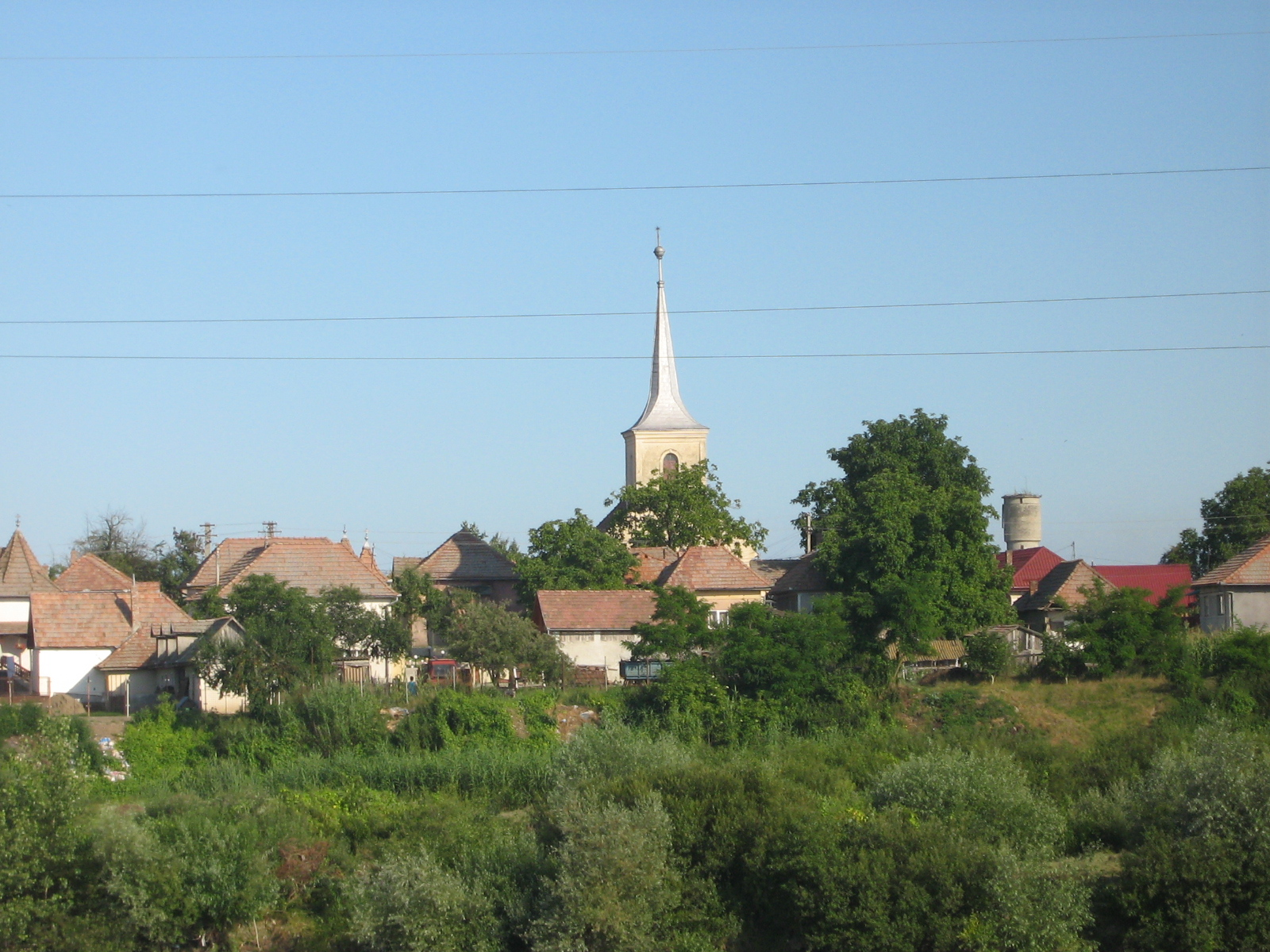

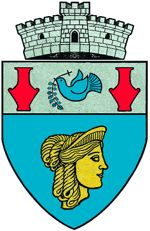
- Coat of arms

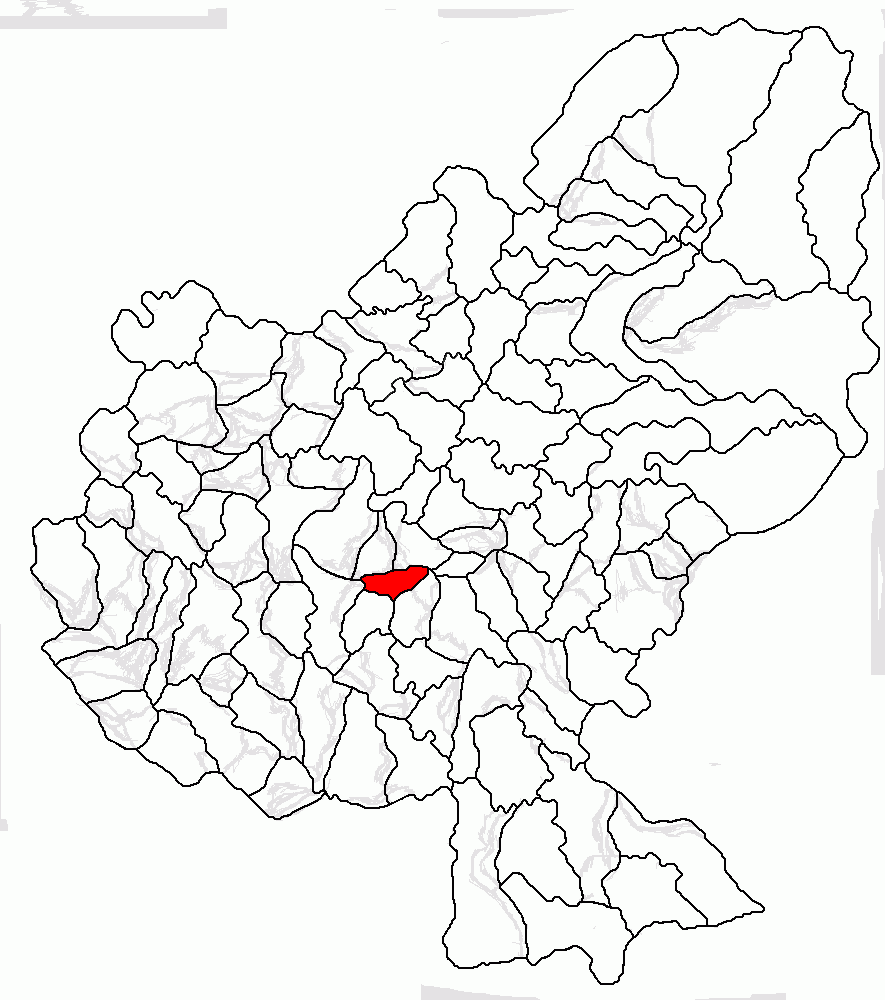
- Location in Mureș County

- Location in Romania
- Coordinates: 46°30′0″N 24°29′0″E
- Country: Romania
- County: Mureș

Government
  - Mayor (2020–2024): Edit Kovács (Ind.)
- Area: 18.13 km^{2} (7.00 sq mi)
- Elevation: 302 m (991 ft)
- Population (2021-12-01): 5,592
  - Density: 308.4/km^{2} (798.9/sq mi)
- Time zone: UTC+02:00 (EET)
  - Summer (DST): UTC+03:00 (EEST)
- Postal code: 547185
- Area code: (+40) 0265
- Vehicle reg.: MS
- Website: cristestimures.ro

Cristești (Hungarian: Maroskeresztúr, Hungarian pronunciation: [mɒroʃkɛrstuːr]) is a commune in Mureș County, Transylvania, Romania that is composed of two villages: Cristești and Vălureni (Székelykakasd).

== Geography ==
The commune is located in the center of the department, on the left side of the Mureș River, on the Transylvanian Plateau, 5 km (3.1 mi) south-west of Târgu Mureș, the county seat, of which it is a suburb.

Cristești is crossed by the national road DN15 (European route E60) which connects Târgu Mureș with Turda and Cluj-Napoca.

== History ==
The first written mention of Cristești village dates from 1332 under the name of Santa Cruce. The village belonged to the Kingdom of Hungary, then to the Austrian Empire and to Austria-Hungary. In 1876, during the administrative reorganization of Transylvania, it was attached to Maros-Torda County. In the aftermath of World War I, the Union of Transylvania with Romania was declared in December 1918. At the start of the Hungarian–Romanian War of 1918–1919, the locality passed under Romanian administration; after the Treaty of Trianon of 1920, it became part of the Kingdom of Romania. In August 1940, the Second Vienna Award granted Northern Transylvania to Hungary. Cristești was occupied by Hungary until 1944, during which time the small Jewish community was exterminated by the Nazis. In October 1944, the area was taken back from Hungarian and German troops by Romanian and Soviet forces. Administered by the Soviet authorities after 12 November 1944, the commune, together with the rest of Northern Transylvania, came under Romanian administration on 13 March 1945.

== Demographics ==
Historical population
Year	Pop.	±%
1850	764	—
1880	963	+26.0%
1900	1,380	+43.3%
1910	1,470	+6.5%
1930	1,739	+18.3%
1956	1,982	+14.0%
1966	4,164	+110.1%
1977	4,960	+19.1%
1992	5,622	+13.3%
2002	5,591	−0.6%
2011	5,824	+4.2%
2021	5,592	−4.0%
Source: Census data

In 1910 the commune had 363 Romanians (24.69%) and 1,053 Hungarians (71.63%). In 1930 there were 461 Romanians (26.51%), 1,164 Hungarians (66.94%), 7 Jews (0.70%), and 104 Roma (5.98%).

According to the 2002 census, Cristești had a population of 5,591 of which 2,421 Romanians (43.30%), 2,767 Székely Hungarians (49.49%), and 395 Roma (7.06%). On that date, there were 1,920 households and 1,888 dwellings. At the 2021 census, the commune had a population of 5,592; of those, 41.61% were Romanians, 37.05% Hungarians, and 13.2% Roma.

== Economy ==
The economy of the commune is mostly based on agriculture and trade and it is highly dependent on nearby Târgu Mureș.

== See also ==
- List of Hungarian exonyms (Mureș County)

== Gallery ==
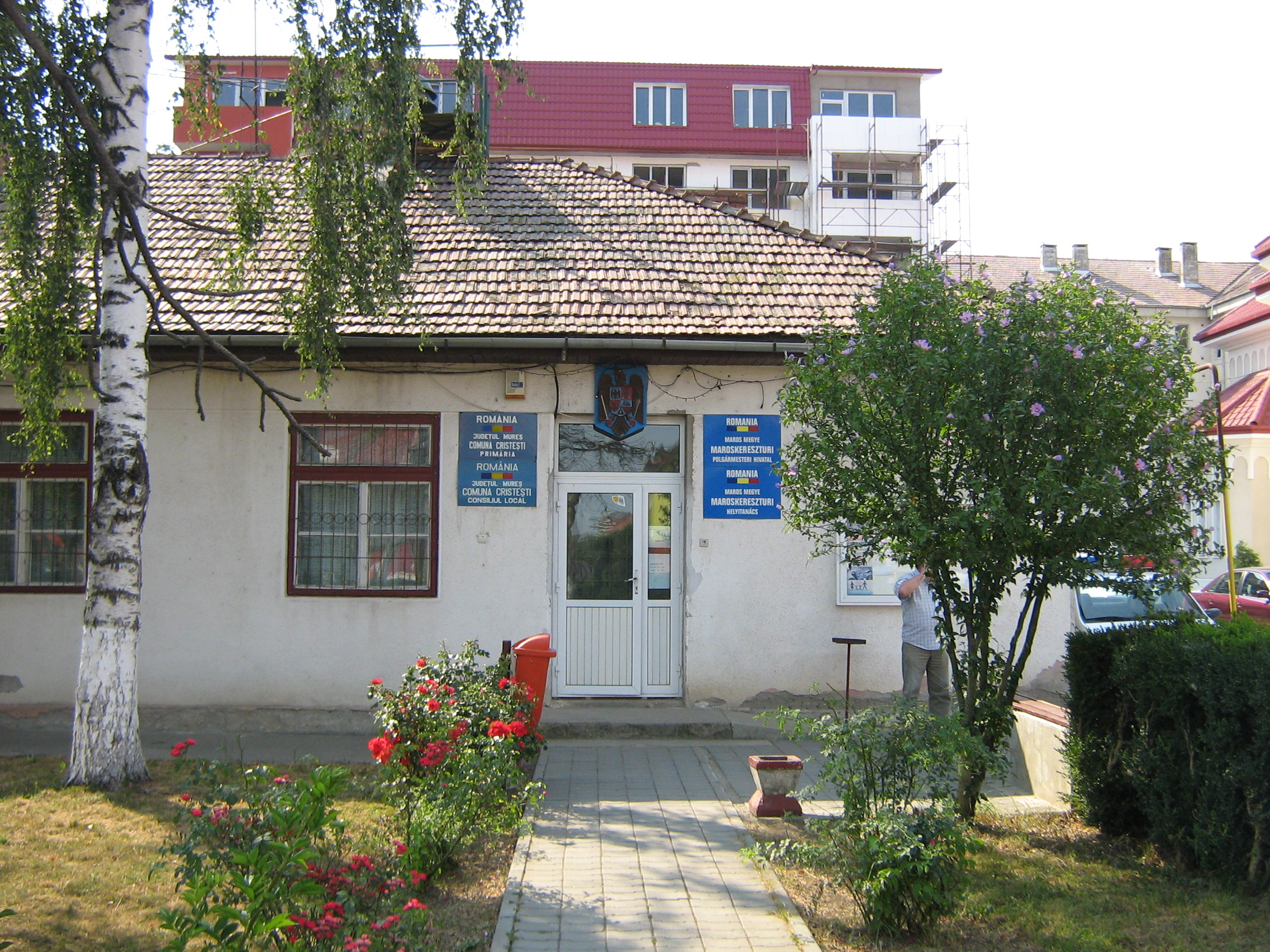
Town Hall

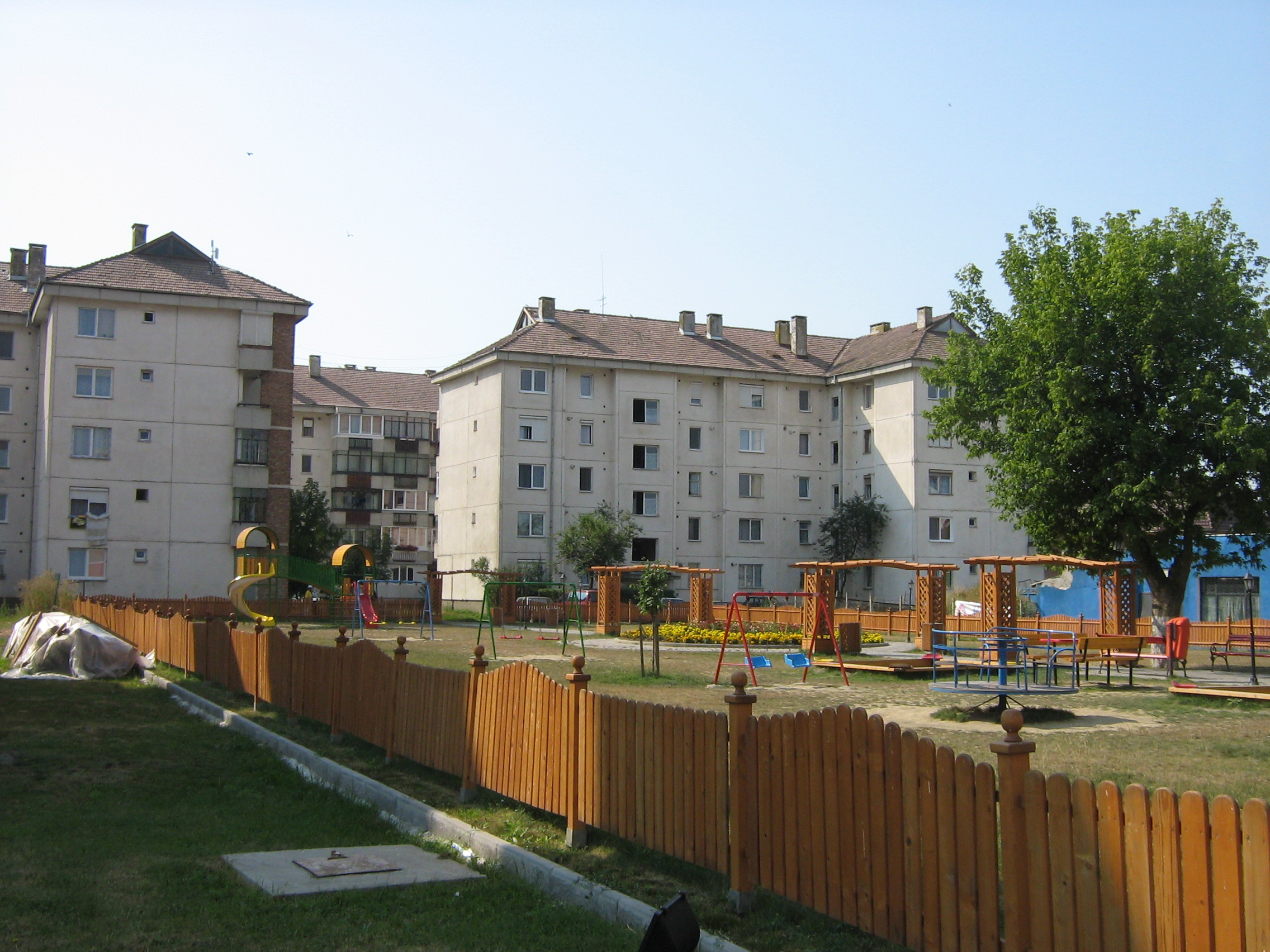
Bulk building

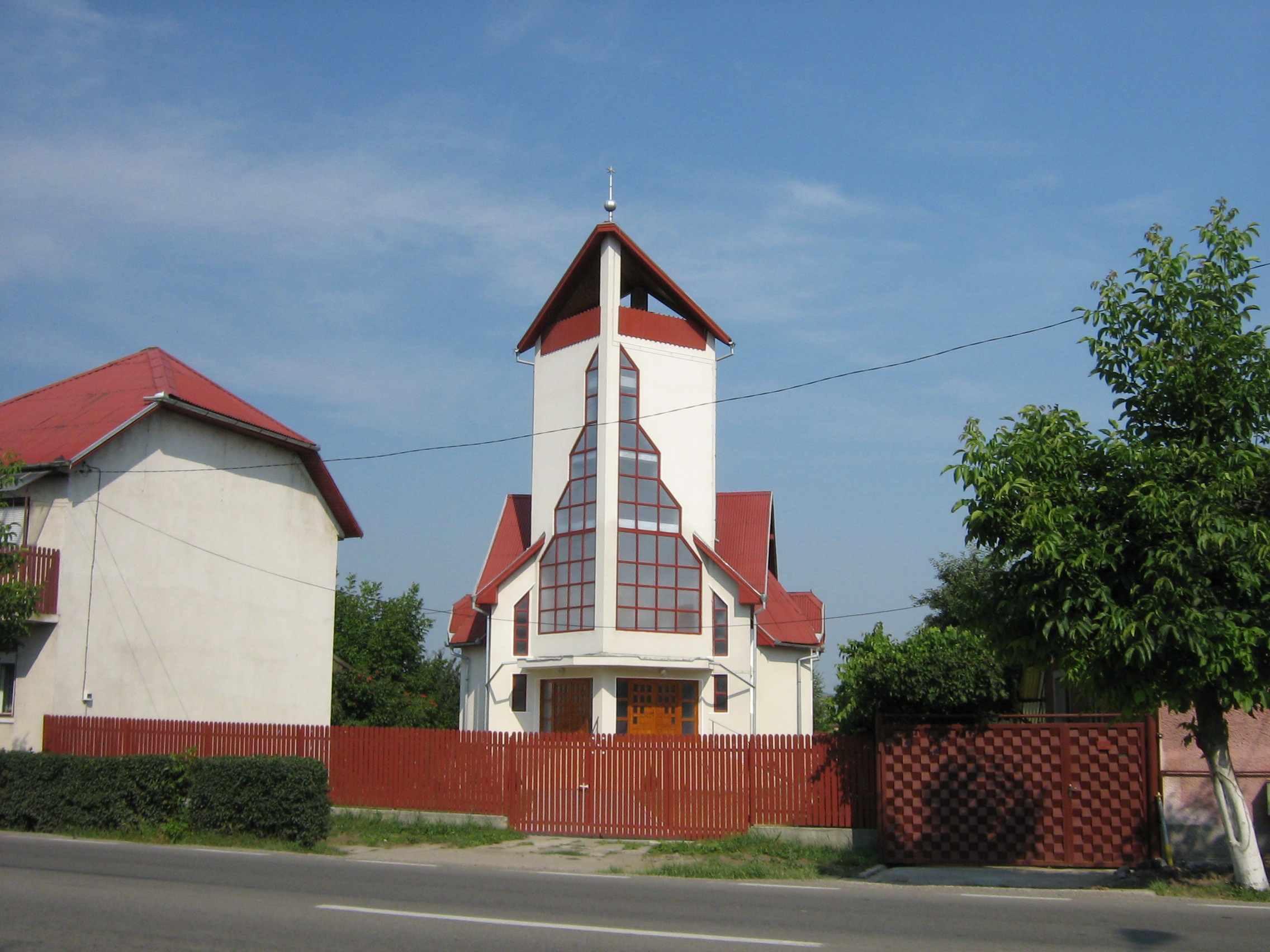
Reformed church

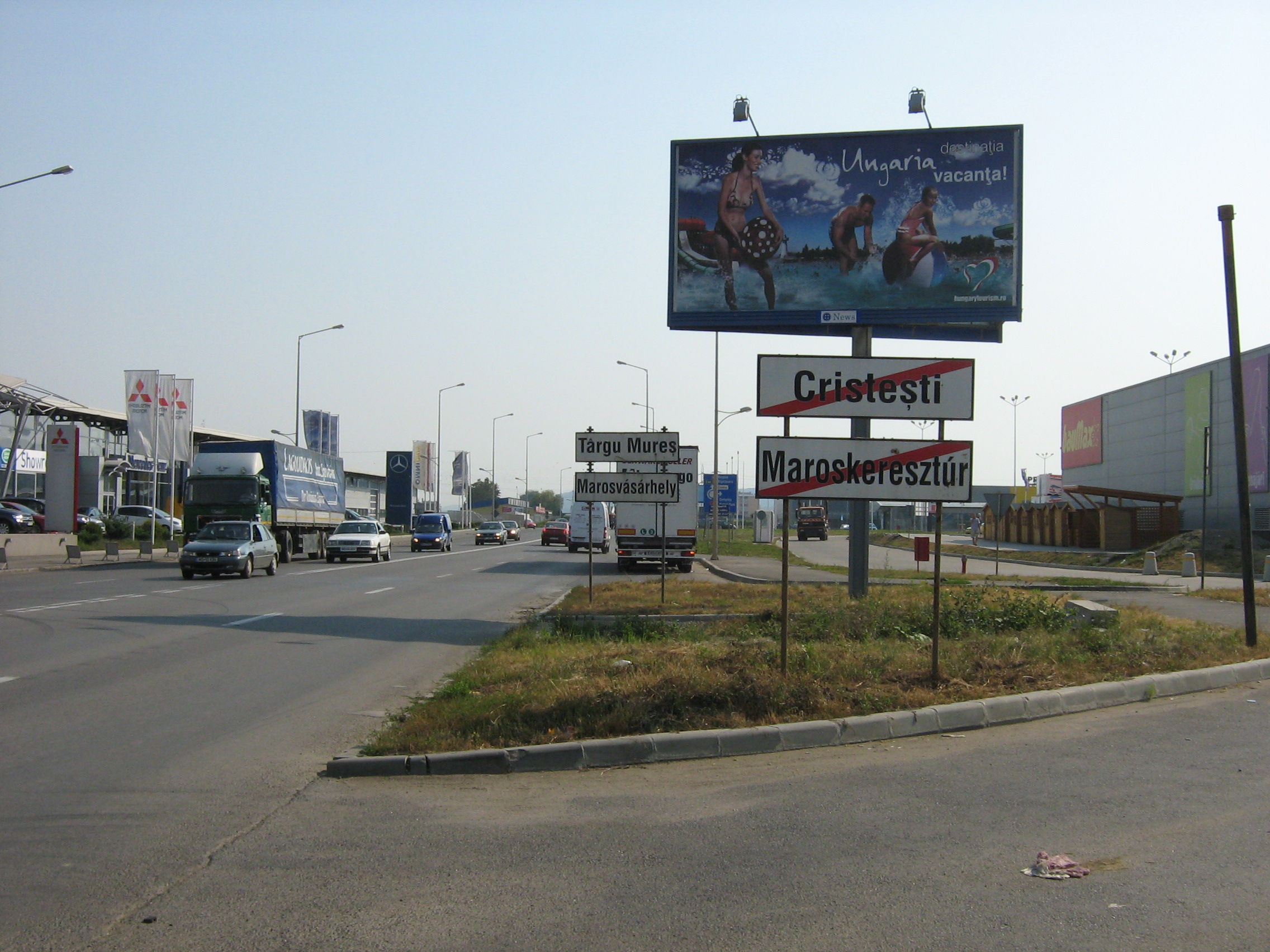
Town border
