= Reference Broadcast Infrastructure Synchronization =

Synchronization protocol

The Reference Broadcast Infrastructure Synchronization (RBIS) protocol is a master/slave synchronization protocol. RBIS, as the Reference Broadcast Time Synchronization (RBS), is a receiver/receiver synchronization protocol, as a consequence timestamps used for clock regulation are acquired only on the receiving of synchronization events. RBIS is specifically tailored to be used in IEEE 802.11 Wi-Fi networks configured in infrastructure mode. Such a kind of networks are based on an access point that coordinates the communication between the wireless nodes (i.e., the STAs), and they are very common.

The advantages of RBIS are that it can be directly used with common access points, no modification is required to the STAs (or minor modifications to improve synchronization performance) and a very small overhead is added to the wireless channel (typically a message every 1 second). Moreover, it allows an easily synchronization with an external time source, because it is a master/slave protocol. Its major drawback is that it does not compensate the propagation delay. This fact limits the achievable synchronization quality to a couple of microsecond, which is typically enough for the very majority of the applications, especially for home automation. An example is the connection of wireless speakers to a television.
