= Cristian Stănescu =

Romanian politician

Cristian Stănescu (born 13 October 1951) is a Romanian politician and Member of the European Parliament. Stănescu is a member of the Greater Romania Party and was a part of the Identity, Tradition, Sovereignty group. He became an MEP on 1 January 2007 with the accession of Romania to the European Union. Stănescu resides in Brașov, Romania with his wife and son.
