= Nicolae Cristea =

Nicolae Cristea may refer to:

- Nicolae Cristea (communist) (1906–1943), participant in the Spanish Civil War and the French Resistance
- Nicolae Cristea (priest) (1834–1902), activist in Transylvania under Austro-Hungarian rule
- Nicolae Cristea (wrestler) (born 1942), Romanian Olympic wrestler
