= Daniel Cristescu =

Romanian footballer

Personal information
- Full name: Alexandru Daniel Cristescu
- Date of birth: 24 May 1987 (age 39)
- Place of birth: Romania
- Position: Defender

Team information
- Current team: Viitorul Liteni
- Number: 2

Youth career
- Ceahlaul Piatra Neamt

Senior career*
| Years | Team | Apps | (Gls) |
| 2006–2008 | Ceahlăul Piatra Neamţ | ? | (?) |
| 2008–2013 | Dunărea Galaţi | 58 | (0) |
| 2013–2014 | Rapid Suceava | 9 | (1) |
| 2014–2015 | Fortuna Poiana Câmpina | ? | (?) |
| 2015–2016 | Bucovina Pojorâta | 30 | (1) |
| 2016–2017 | Atletico Vaslui | ? | (?) |
| 2017– | Viitorul Liteni | ? | (?) |
- * Club domestic league appearances and goals as of 3 March 2017

Alexandru Daniel Cristescu (born 24 May 1987) is a Romanian footballer who plays for Viitorul Liteni.
