= Flaviu Cristian =

Romanian-American computer scientist (1951–1999)

- Born: June 25, 1951; Cluj, Romanian People's Republic
- Died: April 27, 1999 (aged 47); San Diego, California, United States
- Citizenship: American, Romanian
- Education: Grenoble Institute of Technology; Grenoble School of Management; University of Grenoble
- Known for: Cristian's algorithm
- Awards: IBM Corporate Award; IEEE Fellow
- Scientific career
- Fields: Distributed Systems; Computer Science
- Workplaces: University of California, San Diego; IBM Almaden Research Center; University of Newcastle upon Tyne; University of Grenoble

Flaviu Cristian (25 June 1951 – 27 April 1999) was a Romanian-American computer scientist noted for his work in distributed systems and, in particular, the development of a method for clock synchronisation which bears his name, Cristian's algorithm.

== Biography ==
He was born in 1951 in Cluj, in the Transylvania region of Romania, the son of Ilie and Rafila Cristian. After graduating from the Nicolae Bălcescu High School in his native city, he went in 1971 to France to study at the Grenoble Institute of Technology, in the Department of Applied Mathematics and Computer Science. After graduating in 1977 from both the Institute and the Grenoble School of Management, he pursued his graduate studies in computer science at the University of Grenoble, where he carried out research in operating systems and programming methodology, and received his Ph.D. in 1979.

Cristian went on to the University of Newcastle upon Tyne in the United Kingdom, where he worked in the area of specification, design, and verification of fault-tolerant software. In 1982 he emigrated to the United States, joining the IBM Research Center in Almaden Valley, in San Jose, California. In 1991 he joined the University of California, San Diego as Professor in the Department of Computer Science and Engineering.

He died in San Diego in 1999 after a long battle with cancer.

== Publications ==
- Cristian, Flaviu (1985), "Exception Handling and Software Fault Tolerance", in Shrivastava, Santosh Kumar (ed.), Reliable Computer Systems, Berlin, Heidelberg: Springer, pp. 154–172, doi:10.1007/978-3-642-82470-8_16, ISBN 978-3-642-82472-2
- Cristian, Flaviu (1989). "Probabilistic clock synchronization". Distributed Computing. 3 (3): 146–158. doi:10.1007/bf01784024. S2CID 3170166.
- Cristian, Flaviu; Aghili, Houtan; Strong, Ray; Dolev, Danny (1995). "Atomic broadcast: From simple message diffusion to Byzantine agreement". Twenty-Fifth International Symposium on Fault-Tolerant Computing, 1995, ' Highlights from Twenty-Five Years'. Vol. 118. pp. 158–179. doi:10.1109/ftcsh.1995.532668. ISBN 0-8186-7150-5.
- Cristian, Flaviu; Fetzer, Christof (1999). "The timed asynchronous distributed system model". IEEE Transactions on Parallel and Distributed Systems. 10 (6): 642–657. doi:10.1109/71.774912. S2CID 16927690.

== See also ==
- Cristian's algorithm
