= Cristian (disambiguation) =

Cristian is a given name. Cristian may also refer to:

- Cristian, Brașov
- Cristian, Sibiu

== See also ==
- Cristian's algorithm
