= G.8261 =

ITU-T recommendation

ITU-T Recommendation G.8261/Y.1361 (formerly G.pactiming) "Timing and Synchronization Aspects in Packet Networks" specifies the upper limits of allowable network jitter and wander, the minimum requirements that network equipment at the TDM interfaces at the boundary of these packet networks can tolerate, and the minimum requirements for the synchronization function of network equipment.

== Usage ==
Packet networks have been inherently asynchronous. However, as the communications industry moves toward an all IP core and edge network, there is a need to provide synchronization functionality to traditional TDM-based applications. This is essential for the interworking with PSTN. The goal is provide a Primary Reference Clock (PRC) traceable clock for the TDM applications.
