= Cristian (footballer, born 1994) =

Brazilian footballer (born 1994)

Personal information
- Full name: Cristian Fabrício Gomes Machado
- Date of birth: 22 August 1994 (age 32)
- Place of birth: Santana do Livramento, Brazil
- Height: 1.82 m (6 ft 0 in)
- Position: Midfielder

Team information
- Current team: Mosta
- Number: 94

Senior career*
Years	Team	Apps	(Gls)
2009–2010	Cerro Largo	19	(0)
2011–2015	Cerrito	74	(2)
2015	Palmeirense		
2016	Ipanema	0	(0)
2017	Guarany	0	(0)
2017	Operários Mafra	0	(0)
2018	Grêmio Anápolis	0	(0)
2018	→ Uberaba (loan)	0	(0)
2018–2019	Penafiel	15	(0)
2020	Clube Atletico Votuporanguense	1	(0)
2022	Gangneung Citizen FC	14	(3)
2023	Morrinhos	4	(1)
2023	Pelotas		
2024	Morrinhos	9	(0)
2024	Costa Rica	5	(0)
2024–	Mosta	3	(0)
- * Club domestic league appearances and goals as of 16 October 2024

Cristian Fabrício Gomes Machado (born 22 August 1994), commonly known as Cristian, Cristian Machado or Cristian Gomes, is a Brazilian footballer who currently plays as a midfielder for Maltese side Mosta.

== Career statistics ==
=== Club ===
As of 21 June 2019.

Club	Season	League			State League		National Cup		League Cup		Other		Total	
Club	Season	Division	Apps	Goals	Apps	Goals	Apps	Goals	Apps	Goals	Apps	Goals	Apps	Goals
Cerro Largo	2009–10	Uruguayan Primera División	19	0	–		0	0	–		0	0	19	0
Cerrito	2011–12	Uruguayan Primera División	26	0	–		0	0	–		0	0	26	0
Cerrito	2013–14	Uruguayan Primera División	24	2	–		0	0	–		0	0	24	2
Cerrito	2014–15	Uruguayan Primera División	24	0	–		0	0	–		0	0	24	0
Cerrito	Total		74	2	0	0	0	0	0	0	0	0	74	2
Ipanema	2016	–			2 (Note: Appearances in the Campeonato Alagoano)	0	0	0	–		0	0	2	0
Guarany	2017	–			12 (Note: Appearances in the Campeonato Gaúcho A2)	0	0	0	–		0	0	12	0
Operários Mafra	2017	–			10 (Note: Appearances in the Campeonato Catarinense A2)	0	0	0	–		0	0	10	0
Grêmio Anápolis	2018	–			11 (Note: Appearances in the Campeonato Goiano)	1	0	0	–		0	0	11	1
Uberaba (loan)	2018	–			2 (Note: Appearances in the Campeonato Mineiro A2)	0	0	0	–		0	0	2	0
Penafiel	2018–19	LigaPro	15	0	–		2 (Note: Appearances in the Taça de Portugal)	0	0	0	0	0	17	0
Career total			89	2	37	1	2	0	0	0	0	0	128	3
