= Kim Do-keun =

South Korean footballer

Kim Do-keun 김도근
Personal information
- Full name: Kim Do-keun
- Date of birth: 2 March 1972 (age 54)
- Place of birth: Gangneung, Gangwon, South Korea
- Height: 1.80 m (5 ft 11 in)
- Position: Midfielder

Team information
- Current team: Chunnam Dragons

Youth career
- 1991–1994: Hanyang University

Senior career*
Years	Team	Apps	(Gls)
1995–2000	Chunnam Dragons	85	(19)
2000	Verdy Kawasaki	14	(0)
2001	Cerezo Osaka	13	(0)
2001–2005	Chunnam Dragons	74	(4)
2005	Suwon Samsung Bluewings	12	(0)
2006	Gyeongnam FC	14	(0)
Total		212	(23)

International career^{‡}
1992	South Korea U-23	6	(0)
1993–2003	South Korea	22	(1)

Managerial career
- 2007: Hanyang University (Coach)
- 2008: Gwangyang Jecheol High School (Coach)
- 2009–: Chunnam Dragons Reserve (Coach)
- * Club domestic league appearances and goals as of 26 April 2007 ‡ National team caps and goals as of 26 June 2014

- Kim Do-keun
- Hangul: 김도근
- Hanja: 金都根
- RR: Gim Dogeun
- MR: Kim Togŭn

Kim Do-keun (born 2 March 1972) is a former South Korean football player. He is currently a reserve team coach of Chunnam Dragons, the club he mostly played for as a player. He played for the South Korea national football team and was a participant at the 1998 FIFA World Cup.

== Club statistics ==
Club performance			League		Cup		League Cup		Continental		Total	
Season	Club	League	Apps	Goals	Apps	Goals	Apps	Goals	Apps	Goals	Apps	Goals
Korea Republic			League		FA Cup		League Cup		Asia		Total	
1995	Chunnam Dragons	K-League	9	0	—		1	0	—		10	0
1996	Chunnam Dragons	K-League	29	9	?	?	7	1	—			
1997	Chunnam Dragons	K-League	9	2	?	?	12	5	—			
1998	Chunnam Dragons	K-League	18	6	?	?	2	0	?	?		
1999	Chunnam Dragons	K-League	18	2	?	?	7	0	?	?		
2000	Chunnam Dragons	K-League	2	0	?	?	9	5	—			
Japan			League		Emperor's Cup		J.League Cup		Asia		Total	
2000	Verdy Kawasaki	J1 League	14	0	2	0	4	1	—		20	1
2001	Cerezo Osaka	J1 League	13	0	0	0	2	0	—		15	0
Korea Republic			League		FA Cup		League Cup		Asia		Total	
2001	Chunnam Dragons	K-League	3	0	?	?	0	0	—			
2002	Chunnam Dragons	K-League	25	3	?	?	5	0	—			
2003	Chunnam Dragons	K-League	41	1	4	0	-		—		45	1
2004	Chunnam Dragons	K-League	5	0	0	0	0	0	—		5	0
2005	Chunnam Dragons	K-League	0	0	0	0	4	0	—		4	0
2005	Suwon Samsung Bluewings	K-League	12	0	1	0	0	0	?	?		
2006	Gyeongnam FC	K-League	14	0	3	0	9	0	—		26	0
Country	Korea Republic		185	23			56	11				
Country	Japan		27	0	2	0	6	1	—		35	1
Total			212	23								

== National team statistics ==
Korea Republic national team
Year	Apps	Goals
1993	2	0
1994	0	0
1995	0	0
1996	0	0
1997	4	1
1998	11	0
1999	1	0
2000	1	0
2001	1	0
2002	1	0
2003	1	0
Total	22	1

== International goals ==
Results list South Korea's goal tally first.

Date	Venue	Opponent	Score	Result	Competition
10 August 1997	Seoul, South Korea	Brazil	1 goal	1–2	Friendly match

Sporting positions
Preceded by Inaugural	Gyeongnam FC captain 2006	Succeeded by Kim Hyo-Il
