= List of South Korean football transfers winter 2012–13 =

This is a list of South Korean football transfers in the winter transfer window 2012–13.

== Transfers ==
Player	Position	Moving from	Moving to	Fee
Ahn Jae-gon	Midfielder	Incheon United	Incheon Korail	Free
Ahn Sung-nam (draft)	Midfielder	Gwangju FC	FC Pocheon	Free
Ahn Young-gyu (loan)	Midfielder	Suwon Samsung Bluewings	(Japan) Giravanz Kitakyushu	
An Jae-jun	Defender	Jeonnam Dragons	Incheon United	
An Sung-bin (draft)	Forward	Gyeongnam FC	Korean Police	Free
(Australia) Aleksandar Jovanović	Defender	(Thailand) BEC Tero Sasana	Suwon FC	Free
(Australia) Matt McKay	Midfielder	Busan IPark	(China) Changchun Yatai	
Back Sung-woo	Goalkeeper	Dankook University	FC Anyang	
Bae In-young	Goalkeeper	Youngnam University	Daegu FC	
Bae Ki-jin	Defender	Seongnam Ilhwa Chunma		Free
Baek Jong-hwan (draft)	Midfielder	Gangwon FC	Sangju Sangmu	Free
Baek Sun-kyu	Goalkeeper	Incheon United	Gangneung City	Free
(Belgium) Karel De Smet	Defender	(Belgium) Royal Antwerp	Daejeon Citizen	
(Belgium) Kevin Oris	Forward	Daejeon Citizen	Jeonbuk Hyundai Motors	
(Bosnia and Herzegovina) Muhamed Džakmić	Midfielder	Gangwon FC	(Bosnia and Herzegovina) FK Sarajevo	Free
(Brazil) Adriano Pardal	Midfielder	(Brazil) ABC	Daegu FC	Free
(Brazil) Alessandro Lopes	Defender	Daejeon Citizen		Free
(Brazil) Alex Terra	Forward	Daejeon Citizen		Free
(Brazil) Caíque	Midfielder	(Brazil) Vasco da Gama	Ulsan Hyundai	
(Brazil) Cássio	Forward	(Saudi Arabia) Al-Ettifaq	Gwangju FC	
(Brazil) Diogo Acosta	Forward	(Brazil) São Bernardo	Incheon United	
(Brazil) Edcarlos	Defender	(Brazil) Sport	Seongnam Ilhwa Chunma	
(Brazil) Éder Baiano	Defender	Busan IPark	(China) Changchun Yatai	
(Brazil) Éverton Santos	Forward	Seongnam Ilhwa Chunma	(Brazil) Ponte Preta	Free
(Brazil) Fábio Santos	Forward	(Brazil) Avaí	Daegu FC	
(Brazil) Henan	Forward	Jeonnam Dragons	(Brazil) Red Bull Brasil	Free
(Brazil) Ivo	Midfielder	Incheon United	(Brazil) Criciuma	
(Brazil) Jael Ferreira	Forward	Seongnam Ilhwa Chunma	(Brazil) São Caetano	
(Brazil) Jair Eduardo	Forward	Jeju United	(Japan) JEF United Chiba	
(Brazil) João Paulo (loan)	Forward	Gwangju FC	Daejeon Citizen	
(Brazil) José Mota	Forward	Busan IPark		Free
(Brazil) Leandro Lima	Midfielder	Daegu FC		Free
(Brazil) Lúcio Curió	Forward	(Brazil) América-RN	Gwangju FC	Free
(Brazil) Maranhão	Forward	(Japan) Ventforet Kofu	Jeju United	
(Brazil) Marcinho	Midfielder	(Brazil) Joinville	Jeonnam Dragons	
(Brazil) Matheus Humberto	Midfielder	Daegu FC		Free
(Brazil) Patrik Silva (loan)	Midfielder	(Brazil) Palmeiras	Gangwon FC	
(Brazil) Paulo Júnior	Forward	Incheon United		Free
(Brazil) Pedro Júnior	Forward	(Brazil) Vila Nova	Jeju United	
(Brazil) Renan Marques	Forward	Jeju United	(Brazil) América-RN	Free
(Brazil) Roberto César (loan)	Forward	(Japan) FC Tokyo	Ulsan Hyundai	
(Brazil) Rodrigo Leandro	Forward	(Oman) Al-Oruba	Busan IPark	
(Brazil) Rodrigo Pimpão (loan)	Forward	(Brazil) Vasco da Gama	Suwon Samsung Bluewings	
(Brazil) Júnior Santos	Forward	Jeju United	(China) Wuhan Zall	
(Brazil) Thiago Elias	Forward	(Brazil) Ferroviária	Incheon United	
(Brazil) Waldison	Forward	(Brazil) Fortaleza	Jeju United	
(Brazil) Wesley (loan)	Forward	(Brazil) Atlético Mineiro	Gangwon FC	
(Brazil) Weslley Smith (loan)	Forward	(Brazil) Corinthians	Jeonnam Dragons	
(Brazil) William	Forward	(Brazil) Palmeiras	Busan IPark	
Byun Sung-hwan	Defender	Seongnam Ilhwa Chunma	FC Anyang	Free
Chang Hyuk-jin (draft)	Midfielder	Gangwon FC	Sangju Sangmu	Free
Cheon Min-kwan	Defender	Korea University	Seongnam Ilhwa Chunma	
Cho Gyu-seung	Midfielder	Sun Moon University	Daejeon Citizen	
Cho Ho-yeon	Midfielder	FC Seoul	Hyundai Mipo Dockyard	Free
Cho In-hyung	Midfielder	University of Incheon	Ulsan Hyundai	
Cho Joon-hee	Midfielder	Sun Moon University	Seongnam Ilhwa Chunma	
Cho Kyum-son	Defender	Incheon University	Incheon United	
Cho Soo-chul	Midfielder	Woosuk University	Seongnam Ilhwa Chunma	
Cho Sung-hwan	Defender	Jeonbuk Hyundai Motors		Free
Choi Bum-yong	Defender	Sangji University	Suwon FC	
Choi Byung-do	Defender	Hyundai Mipo Dockyard	Goyang Hi FC	Free
Choi Dong-ho	Forward	Chungju Hummel		Free
Choi In-chang	Forward	Hanyang University	Bucheon FC 1995	
Choi Jae-pil	Defender	Suwon FC		Free
Choi Jae-won	Midfielder	Mokpo City	Bucheon FC 1995	Free
Choi Jin-ho	Defender	Busan IPark		Free
Choi Jin-soo (loan)	Midfielder	Ulsan Hyundai	FC Anyang	
Choi Jun-suck	Midfielder	Sehan University	FC Anyang	
Choi Kwang-hee (draft)	Midfielder	Busan IPark	Korean Police	Free
Choi Nak-min	Forward	Suwon Samsung Bluewings	Bucheon FC 1995	Free
Choi Seung-in	Forward	Cheongju Jikji	Gangwon FC	
Choi Woo-jae	Defender	Chung-Ang University	Gangwon FC	
Choi Woo-sun	Forward	Sangji University	Seongnam Ilhwa Chunma	
Chu Pyung-kang	Midfielder	Dongguk University	Suwon Samsung Bluewings	
Chung Woon	Midfielder	Ulsan Hyundai	(Croatia) Istra 1961	
(Colombia) Julián Estiven Vélez	Midfielder	Ulsan Hyundai	(Japan) Vissel Kobe	
(Colombia) Wilmar Jordán Gil	Forward	Gyeongnam FC	Seongnam Ilhwa Chunma	
Don Ji-deok	Defender	Goyang KB Kookmin Bank	FC Anyang	
(Ghana) Derek Asamoah	Forward	Pohang Steelers	Daegu FC	
Gil Tae-hyun	Forward	Goyang Hi FC		Free
Go Dae-woo	Midfielder	Daejeon Citizen		Free
Go Seul-ki	Forward	Ulsan Hyundai	(Qatar) El Jaish	
Gong Min-hyun	Forward	Cheongju University	Bucheon FC 1995	
Ha In-ho	Defender	Gyeongnam FC	Busan Transportation Corporation	Free
Ha Jung-heon	Forward	Goyang KB Kookmin Bank	Suwon FC	Free
Ha Kang-jin	Goalkeeper	Seongnam Ilhwa Chunma	Gyeongnam FC	
Ha Tae-goon (draft)	Forward	Suwon Samsung Bluewings	Sangju Sangmu	Free
Ham Min-seok	Defender	Gangwon FC		Free
Han Dong-ho	Defender	Chungju Hummel		Free
Han Hong-kyu	Forward	Sungkyunkwan University	Chungju Hummel	
Han Hyo-hyeok	Midfielder	Dongshin University	Gwangju FC	
Han Jae-woong	Forward	Jeonnam Dragons	Incheon United	
Han Jae-woong	Forward	Incheon United	(Thailand) Buriram United	
Han Sang-woon	Forward	(Japan) Júbilo Iwata	Ulsan Hyundai	
Han Seung-yeop	Forward	Kyonggi University	Daegu FC	
Heo Jae-beom	Midfielder	Woosuk University	Daejeon Citizen	
Hong Chul	Defender	Seongnam Ilhwa Chunma	Suwon Samsung Bluewings	
Hong Ju-bin	Midfielder	Jeonbuk Hyundai Motors	Chungju Hummel	Free
Hong Pil-gi	Midfielder	Goyang Hi FC		Free
Hong Sang-won	Forward	Goyang Hi FC	Busan Transportation Corporation	
Hwang Cheol-hwan	Forward	Suwon FC	Gyeongju KHNP	
Hwang Do-won	Defender	Suwon FC		Free
Hwang Hee-hoon	Goalkeeper	Goyang KB Kookmin Bank	Goyang Hi FC	
Hwang In-ho	Defender	Daegu University	Jeju United	
Hwang In-seong	Forward	FC Seoul		Free
Hwang Ji-jun	Midfielder	Gwangju University	Gwangju FC	
Hwang Jong-min	Midfielder	Chungju Hummel		Free
Hwang Jung-soo	Midfielder	Pohang Steelers		Free
Hwang Sun-bo	Forward	Unattached	Jeonnam Dragons	Free
Hwang Sun-il	Defender	Chungju Hummel		Free
Hwang Sun-pil	Defender	Busan IPark		Free
Hwang Sung-min	Goalkeeper	Hannam University	Chungju Hummel	
Hwang Ui-jo	Forward	Yonsei University	Seongnam Ilhwa Chunma	
Im Dong-seon	Defender	Myongji University	Gangwon FC	
Im Jong-wook	Midfielder	Changwon City	Chungju Hummel	
Im Yo-hwan	Defender	Unattached	Gyeongnam FC	Free
In Joon-yeon (loan)	Midfielder	Daegu FC	Chungju Hummel	
Jang Gyu-in	Defender	Myongji University	Ulsan Hyundai	
Jang Hyuk	Midfielder	Suwon FC		Free
Jang Ji-wook	Forward	Suwon FC	Gyeongju KHNP	
Jang Joo-seong	Forward	Yeungnam University	Pohang Steelers	
Jang Kyung-jin	Defender	Gwangju FC	Hyundai Mipo Dockyard	Free
Jang Suk-min	Midfielder	Gangwon FC		Free
Je Jong-hyun	Goalkeeper	Soongsil University	Gwangju FC	
Jeon Gun-jong	Midfielder	Suwon Samsung Bluewings	Hwaseong FC	Free
Jeon Hun	Defender	Sangji University	Gangwon FC	
Jeon Hyeon-chul	Forward	Seongnam Ilhwa Chunma	Jeonnam Dragons	
Jeon Hyung-sub	Defender	Sungkyunkwan University	Incheon United	
Jeon Kwan-woo	Midfielder	Seongnam Ilhwa Chunma		Free
Jeon Myeong-geun	Forward	Honam University	Gwangju FC	
Jeon Sang-wook	Goalkeeper	Busan IPark	Seongnam Ilhwa Chunma	Free
Jeong An-mo	Midfielder	Daegu FC	Gimpo FC	Free
Jeong Dong-yeon	Defender	FC Seoul		Free
Jeong Hwuy	Defender	Kyungwoon University	Daejeon Citizen	
Jeong Hyuk	Midfielder	Incheon United	Jeonbuk Hyundai Motors	
Jeong Jae-yong	Midfielder	Korea University	FC Anyang	
Jeong Jang-hoon	Forward	Ulsan Hyundai		Free
Jeong Seok-min	Midfielder	Jeju United	Daejeon Citizen	
Jeong Shung-hoon	Forward	Jeonnam Dragons	Daejeon Citizen	
Jin Chang-soo	Forward	Gangneung	Goyang Hi FC	
Jin Kyung-sun	Midfielder	Jeonbuk Hyundai Motors	Gangwon FC	
Jo Chul-in	Defender	Yeungnam University	Suwon Samsung Bluewings	
Jo Hyeon-woo	Goalkeeper	Sun Moon University	Daegu FC	
Jo Su-huk	Goalkeeper	FC Seoul	Incheon United	
Jo Sung-jun	Midfielder	Cheongju University	FC Anyang	
Jo Woo-jin	Midfielder	Gwangju FC	Daegu FC	Free
Jong Tae-se	Forward	(Germany) Köln	Suwon Samsung Bluewings	
Joo Hyun-jae	Midfielder	Incheon United	FC Anyang	Free
Joo In-bae	Defender	Gyeongnam FC	Gangneung City	Free
Joo Myung-gyu	Forward	Goyang Hi FC		Free
Joo Sung-hwan (loan)	Forward	Jeonnam Dragons	Gyeongju KHNP	
Joo Yung-jae	Defender	Seongnam Ilhwa Chunma		Free
(Japan) Chikashi Masuda	Midfielder	(Japan) Kashima Antlers	Ulsan Hyundai	
(Japan) Sergio Escudero	Forward	(Japan) Urawa Red Diamonds	FC Seoul	
Ju Il-tae	Midfielder	University of Suwon	Bucheon FC 1995	
Ju Min-kyu	Midfielder	Hanyang University	Goyang Hi FC	
Jun Sang-won	Midfielder	Suwon FC	Daejeon Citizen	
Jung Da-un	Goalkeeper	Seongnam Ilhwa Chunma	Suwon Samsung Bluewings	Free
Jung Dong-jin	Midfielder	Chosun University	Gwangju FC	
Jung Eui-do	Goalkeeper	Seongnam Ilhwa Chunma	Suwon FC	Free
Jung Hoon (draft)	Midfielder	Jeonbuk Hyundai Motors	Sangju Sangmu	Free
Jung Hoon-chan	Midfielder	Jeonnam Dragons	Goyang Hi FC	Free
Jung Hyun-yoon	Defender	Jeonnam Dragons	FC Anyang	
Jung Hyung-joon	Defender	Daejeon Citizen	Hyundai Mipo Dockyard	Free
Jung In-hwan	Defender	Incheon United	Jeonbuk Hyundai Motors	
Jung Ji-an	Forward	Daegu University	Seongnam Ilhwa Chunma	
Jung Jo-gook (draft)	Forward	FC Seoul	Korean Police	Free
Jung Kyung-ho	Midfielder	Jeju United	Gwangju FC	
Jung Min-gyo	Goalkeeper	Goyang KB Kookmin Bank	FC Anyang	
Jung Myung-oh	Midfielder	Jeonnam Dragons	(Thailand) Army United	Free
Jung Seok-hwa	Midfielder	Korea University	Busan IPark	
Jung Seon-ho	Midfielder	Hyundai Mipo Dockyard	Seongnam Ilhwa Chunma	
Jung Sung-jo	Defender	Paju Citizen	FC Anyang	
Jung Sung-min	Forward	Gangwon FC	Gyeongnam FC	Free
Jwa Joon-hyup	Midfielder	Jeonju University	Jeju United	
Ka Sol-hyun	Defender	Korea University	FC Anyang	
Kang Chul-min (draft)	Midfielder	Gyeongnam FC	Korean Police	Free
Kang Dae-ho	Defender	Busan IPark	Gyeongju Citizen	Free
Kang Du-ho	Defender	Chungju Hummel		Free
Kang Hyun-young	Forward	Daegu FC	Busan Transportation Corporation	Free
Kang Ji-baek	Defender	Kyonggi University	Chungju Hummel	
Kang Jin-wook	Defender	Ulsan Hyundai	Seongnam Ilhwa Chunma	
Kang Jong-guk	Forward	Hongik University	Gyeongnam FC	
Kang Ju-ho	Midfielder	Jeonbuk Hyundai Motors	Chungju Hummel	Free
Kang Kyung-mook	Defender	Kwangwoon University	Gangwon FC	
Kang Min-woo	Defender	Gangwon FC		Free
Kang Woo-ram	Defender	Daejeon Citizen		Free
Kang Woo-yeol	Forward	Taekyeung college	Daegu FC	
Kang Yong	Defender	Daegu FC	Incheon United	Free
Kang Young-yeon	Defender	Soongsil University	Incheon United	
Kim Bo-sung	Defender	Gyeongnam FC		Free
Kim Bong-jin	Midfielder	Dong-Eui University	Gangwon FC	
Kim Bong-rae	Defender	Myongji University	Jeju United	
Kim Byung-ji	Goalkeeper	Gyeongnam FC	Jeonnam Dragons	Free
Kim Byung-oh	Forward	Hyundai Mipo Dockyard	FC Anyang	
Kim Chang-dae	Midfielder	Hannam University	Chungju Hummel	
Kim Chang-hoon	Defender	Daejeon Citizen	Incheon United	Free
Kim Chang-hun	Defender	Daejeon Citizen	Incheon United	
Kim Chang-soo	Defender	Busan IPark	(Japan) Kashiwa Reysol	
Kim Da-bin	Forward	Ulsan Hyundai	Chungju Hummel	Free
Kim Dae-kyung	Forward	Soongsil University	Suwon Samsung Bluewings	
Kim Dae-san	Defender	Sejong University	Gangwon FC	
Kim Dae-wook	Defender	Daejeon Citizen	Gyeongju KHNP	Free
Kim Deok-il	Forward	Seongnam Ilhwa Chunma	Seoul United	Free
Kim Do-hoon (draft)	Forward	Gangwon FC	Korean Police	Free
Kim Do-hyung (1990)	Forward	Dong-A University	Busan IPark	
Kim Do-hyung (1988)	Defender	Chungju Hummel		Free
Kim Dong-chan (draft)	Forward	Jeonbuk Hyundai Motors	Sangju Sangmu	Free
Kim Dong-gun	Forward	Dankook University	Suwon FC	
Kim Dong-gwon	Defender	(Japan) FC Gifu	Chungju Hummel	Free
Kim Dong-hee	Forward	Daejeon Citizen	(Japan) Giravanz Kitakyushu	Free
Kim Dong-ho	Defender	Namyangju United	Gangwon FC	
Kim Dong-hun	Defender	Chungju Hummel		Free
Kim Dong-hwi	Defender	University of Suwon	FC Anyang	
Kim Dong-hyeok	Defender	Chosun University	Daejeon Citizen	
Kim Dong-hyo	Forward	Goyang Hi FC		Free
Kim Dong-sub	Forward	Gwangju FC	Seongnam Ilhwa Chunma	
Kim Dong-woo (1987)	Midfielder	Chungju Hummel		Free
Kim Dong-woo (1988) (draft)	Defender	FC Seoul	Korean Police	Free
Kim Dong-wook	Midfielder	Yewon Arts University	Chungju Hummel	
Kim Duk-soo	Goalkeeper	Mokpo City	Bucheon FC 1995	Free
Kim Eun-chong	Forward	Pohang Steelers	Gimpo FC	Free
Kim Geun-chol	Midfielder	Jeonnam Dragons	Gwangju FC	Free
Kim Gi-hyun	Midfielder	Suwon FC		Free
Kim Gi-yong	Goalkeeper	Korea University	Busan IPark	
Kim Gwi-hyeon	Midfielder	(Argentina) Vélez Sársfield	Daegu FC	
Kim Gyeong-min	Defender	Yonsei University	Incheon United	
Kim Hak-jun	Midfielder	Chungju Hummel		Free
Kim Han-seob	Defender	Incheon United	Daejeon Citizen	
Kim Han-yoon	Defender	Busan IPark	Seongnam Ilhwa Chunma	Free
Kim Heung-il	Forward	Dong-A University	Daegu FC	
Kim Hyeung-bum	Midfielder	Jeonbuk Hyundai Motors	Gyeongnam FC	
Kim Hyo-gi (draft)	Midfielder	Ulsan Hyundai	Hwaseong FC	Free
Kim Hyo-jin	Midfielder	Yonsei University	Gangwon FC	
Kim Hyun (loan)	Forward	Jeonbuk Hyundai Motors	Seongnam Ilhwa Chunma	
Kim Hyun-gon	Midfielder	Gyeongnam FC	Gimhae City	Free
Kim Hyun-woo	Midfielder	Seongnam Ilhwa Chunma		Free
Kim Hyung-pil (draft)	Forward	Busan IPark	Cheongju Jikji	Free
Kim Jae-hoon	Midfielder	Daejeon Citizen	Gangneung City	Free
Kim Jae-hwan	Defender	Suwon Samsung Bluewings		Free
Kim Jae-woong	Forward	Chungju Hummel		Free
Kim Jae-yeon	Midfielder	Incheon United	Suwon FC	Free
Kim Jee-wong	Midfielder	Gyeongnam FC	Busan IPark	Free
Kim Ji-sung (1985)	Midfielder	Goyang Hi FC		Free
Kim Ji-sung (1987)	Goalkeeper	Yongin City	Gwangju FC	
Kim Ji-woong	Defender	Kwangwoon University	Seongnam Ilhwa Chunma	
Kim Jin-hyun	Midfielder	Daejeon KHNP	Daejeon Citizen	Free
Kim Jong-soo	Defender	Gyeongnam FC	Daejeon Citizen	Free
Kim Ju-hyoung	Midfielder	Suwon FC		Free
Kim Jun-su	Defender	Yeungnam University	Pohang Steelers	
Kim Jun-yeop	Midfielder	Jeju United	Gwangju FC	
Kim Jung-in	Goalkeeper	Incheon United	Busan Transportation Corporation	Free
Kim Jung-joo (loan)	Forward	Gangwon FC	Gangneung City	
Kim Kang-hyun	Midfielder	Sun Moon University	Daejeon Citizen	
Kim Kang-min	Defender	Myongji University	Jeonbuk Hyundai Motors	
Kim Ki-joong	Defender	Goyang KB Kookmin Bank	FC Anyang	
Kim Kwan-cheol	Defender	Suwon Samsung Bluewings		Free
Kim Kwang-hyun	Forward	Chungju Hummel		Free
Kim Kyo-bin	Goalkeeper	Daegu FC	Incheon United	Free
Kim Min	Midfielder	Chungju Hummel	FC Pocheon	
Kim Min-hak	Defender	Gyeongnam FC	Cheongju Jikji	Free
Kim Min-ho	Midfielder	University of Incheon	Bucheon FC 1995	
Kim Min-joong	Midfielder	Pai Chai University	Daejeon Citizen	
Kim Min-sik (draft)	Goalkeeper	Jeonbuk Hyundai Motors	Sangju Sangmu	Free
Kim Min-soo (1990)	Forward	Yonsei University	Jeonnam Dragons	
Kim Min-soo (1984)	Midfielder	Incheon United	Gyeongnam FC	
Kim Min-su	Midfielder	Yong In University	Bucheon FC 1995	
Kim Min-sub	Goalkeeper	Goyang Hi FC		Free
Kim Moon-ju	Midfielder	Konkuk University	Daejeon Citizen	
Kim Myung-kyu	Midfielder	University of Suwon	Bucheon FC 1995	
Kim Nam-chun	Defender	Kwangwoon University	FC Seoul	
Kim Nam-gul	Defender	Ulsan Hyundai	Jeonbuk Hyundai Motors	Free
Kim Oh-sung	Midfielder	Daegu FC	Hyundai Mipo Dockyard	Free
Kim Pyoung-jin	Midfielder	Hannam University	Daejeon Citizen	
Kim Sang-jin	Goalkeeper	Chungju Hummel		Free
Kim Sang-kyun	Midfielder	Dongshin University	Goyang Hi FC	
Kim Sang-pil	Defender	Sungkyunkwan University	FC Seoul	
Kim Sang-rok	Midfielder	Hyundai Mipo Dockyard	Bucheon FC 1995	Free
Kim Se-hun	Forward	Seongnam Ilhwa Chunma	Hyundai Mipo Dockyard	Free
Kim Sea-jun	Goalkeeper	Gyeongnam FC	Gimpo FC	Free
Kim Seong-soo	Midfielder	Pai Chai University	Daejeon Citizen	
Kim Seung-dae	Midfielder	Yeungnam University	Pohang Steelers	
Kim Sin-chul	Midfielder	Yonsei University	Bucheon FC 1995	
Kim Sun-bum	Defender	Chungju Hummel		Free
Kim Sun-jin	Goalkeeper	Jeju United	Mokpo City	Free
Kim Sun-woo	Forward	Pohang Steelers	Seongnam Ilhwa Chunma	Free
Kim Sung-guk	Defender	Kwangwoon University	FC Anyang	
Kim Sung-hwan	Midfielder	Seongnam Ilhwa Chunma	Ulsan Hyundai	
Kim Sung-jin	Defender	Myongji University	Gwangju FC	
Kim Sung-jun	Midfielder	Chungju Hummel		Free
Kim Sung-min	Forward	Nambu University	Chungju Hummel	
Kim Tae-bong	Defender	Gangneung City	FC Anyang	
Kim Tae-ho	Defender	Ajou University	Jeonnam Dragons	
Kim Tae-hwan	Midfielder	FC Seoul	Seongnam Ilhwa Chunma	
Kim Tae-hyung	Forward	Seoul United	Suwon FC	Free
Kim Tae-jin	Defender	Unattached	Daegu FC	Free
Kim Tae-joon	Midfielder	Busan IPark	Goyang Hi FC	Free
Kim Tae-min	Midfielder	Gangwon FC	(China) Chongqing FC	Free
Kim Won-min	Midfielder	Goyang KB Kookmin Bank	FC Anyang	
Kim Won-sik (draft)	Midfielder	FC Seoul	Korean Police	Free
Kim Woo-jin	Midfielder	Daejeon Citizen	Daegu FC	Free
Kim Yong-chan	Defender	FC Seoul	Gyeongnam FC	Free
Kim Yong-han	Midfielder	University of Suwon	Suwon FC	
Kim Young-chan	Defender	Korea University	Jeonbuk Hyundai Motors	
Kim Young-in	Midfielder	Incheon United	Seoul United	Free
Kim Young-jae	Midfielder	Seongnam Ilhwa Chunma		Free
Kim Young-nam	Forward	Goyang KB Kookmin Bank	FC Anyang	
Kim Young-yun	Defender	Dongguk University	Gangwon FC	
Kim Yun-ho	Forward	Kwandong University	Gangwon FC	
Ko Byung-soo	Defender	Dongguk University	Daejeon Citizen	
Ko Gi-hun	Midfielder	Gwangju Gwangsan	Gangwon FC	
Ko Jae-sung (draft)	Defender	Gyeongnam FC	Sangju Sangmu	Free
Ko Kyung-min	Forward	Yongin City	FC Anyang	
Ko Min-joo	Forward	Gangwon FC		Free
Kwak Jeong-sul	Forward	Hanyang University	Goyang Hi FC	
Kwak Jung-geun	Midfielder	FC Seoul	Icheon Citizen	Free
Kwak Min-sung	Defender	Suwon FC		Free
Kwak Tae-hwi	Defender	Ulsan Hyundai	(Saudi Arabia) Al-Shabab	
Kwon Hyuk-kwan	Midfielder	Kwandong University	Chungju Hummel	
Kwon Jin-young	Defender	Soongsil University	Busan IPark	
Kwon Kyung-won	Defender	Dong-A University	Jeonbuk Hyundai Motors	
Kwon Soon-kyu	Midfielder	Seongnam Ilhwa Chunma	Daejeon Citizen	Free
Kwon Soon-yong	Midfielder	Dankook University	Jeonbuk Hyundai Motors	
Kwon Tae-ahn	Goalkeeper	Suwon Samsung Bluewings	Gyeongnam FC	Free
Kwon Yong-hyun	Midfielder	Cheonan City	Suwon FC	
Kwon Yong-nam	Defender	Jeju United	Gwangju FC	
Kyun Hee-jae	Midfielder	Seongnam Ilhwa Chunma	Cheongju Jikji	Free
Lee Bo-hwi	Midfielder	Daegu University	Daejeon Citizen	
Lee Bong-jun	Defender	Gangneung City	Gangwon FC	Free
Lee Chang-ho	Midfielder	Gyeongnam FC	Suwon FC	Free
Lee Chang-yong	Defender	Yong In University	Gangwon FC	
Lee Choon-hyun	Midfielder	Chungju Hummel		Free
Lee Chun-soo	Forward	Jeonnam Dragons	Incheon United	Free
Lee Dae-myung	Midfielder	Hongik University	Incheon United	
Lee Dong-geun	Midfielder	Gyeongnam FC		Free
Lee Dong-hyun (November 1989)	Forward	Gangneung City	Daejeon Citizen	Free
Lee Dong-hyun (March 1989)	Midfielder	Ulsan Hyundai		Free
Lee Dong-min	Midfielder	Jeonbuk Hyundai Motors		Free
Lee Dong-myung	Forward	(Japan) Oita Trinita	Daegu FC	
Lee Eu-ddeum	Defender	Yong In University	FC Anyang	
Lee Gang-jin (loan)	Defender	Jeonbuk Hyundai Motors	Daejeon Citizen	
Lee Geun-pyo	Goalkeeper	Gyeongnam FC	Gangwon FC	Free
Lee Geun-yong	Defender	Chungju Hummel		Free
Lee Gun-hee	Forward	Chungju Hummel		Free
Lee Gwang-jae	Forward	Daegu FC	Goyang Hi FC	Free
Lee Hae-jung	Forward	Chungju Hummel	Gimhae City	
Lee Haeng-su	Forward	Daegu FC	Gangneung City	Free
Lee Ho (1986) (draft)	Defender	Daejeon Citizen	Korean Police	Free
Lee Ho (1984) (draft)	Midfielder	Ulsan Hyundai	Sangju Sangmu	Free
Lee Hu-kwon	Midfielder	Kwangwoon University	Bucheon FC 1995	
Lee Hwi-soo	Goalkeeper	Daegu University	Jeonnam Dragons	
Lee Hyeong-gi	Defender	Jeonbuk Hyundai Motors		Free
Lee Hyun-chang	Midfielder	Gangneung City	Goyang Hi FC	Free
Lee Hyun-jin	Midfielder	Suwon Samsung Bluewings	Jeju United	Free
Lee Hyun-pil	Defender	Chungju Hummel		Free
Lee Hyun-woong	Midfielder	Daejeon Citizen	Suwon Samsung Bluewings	Free
Lee Jae-eok	Defender	Ajou University	Jeonnam Dragons	
Lee Jae-il	Forward	FC Seoul		Free
Lee Jae-kwang	Defender	Seongnam Ilhwa Chunma		Free
Lee Jae-min	Midfielder	Myongji University	Gyeongnam FC	
Lee Jae-myung	Defender	Gyeongnam FC	Jeonbuk Hyundai Motors	Free
Lee Jae-seong (draft)	Defender	Ulsan Hyundai	Sangju Sangmu	Free
Lee Je-kyu	Midfielder	Suwon Samsung Bluewings		Free
Lee Jin-hyung	Goalkeeper	Jeju United	FC Anyang	
Lee Jin-jae	Forward	Chungju Hummel	Bucheon FC 1995	
Lee Jin-kyu	Goalkeeper	Seongnam Ilhwa Chunma	Gimhae City	Free
Lee Jin-seuk	Forward	Yeungnam University	Pohang Steelers	
Lee Jin-woo	Midfielder	Suwon Samsung Bluewings		Free
Lee Jong-chan	Midfielder	Gangneung City	Gangwon FC	
Lee Jong-in	Midfielder	Icheon Citizen	Gangwon FC	Free
Lee Jong-min	Midfielder	FC Seoul	Suwon Samsung Bluewings	
Lee Joon-ho	Midfielder	Incheon United	Suwon FC	Free
Lee Jun-hyung (draft)	Defender	Gangwon FC	Cheongju Jikji	Free
Lee Jun-yeob	Midfielder	Incheon Korail	Gangwon FC	
Lee Jung-geun	Midfielder	Chungju Hummel		Free
Lee Jung-hun	Defender	Chosun University	Suwon FC	
Lee Jung-hwan (1988)	Defender	Changwon City	Gyeongnam FC	
Lee Jung-hwan (1991)	Forward	Goyang Hi FC		Free
Lee Jung-ki	Forward	Soongsil University	Busan IPark	
Lee Jung-kwon	Midfielder	Myongji University	Jeonnam Dragons	
Lee Jung-min	Defender	Chung-Ang University	Seongnam Ilhwa Chunma	
Lee Jung-rae	Goalkeeper	Gwangju FC		Free
Lee Keun-ho (draft)	Midfielder	Ulsan Hyundai	Sangju Sangmu	Free
Lee Kook-ho	Forward	Kwangwoon University	Daejeon Citizen	
Lee Kwang-hyun	Defender	Daejeon Citizen		Free
Lee Kyu-ro	Midfielder	Incheon United	Jeonbuk Hyundai Motors	
Lee Kyung-soon	Defender	Suwon Samsung Bluewings		Free
Lee Min-kyu	Defender	Gangwon FC	Chungju Hummel	Free
Lee Sang-don (draft)	Midfielder	Gangwon FC	FC Pocheon	Free
Lee Sang-ho (draft)	Midfielder	Suwon Samsung Bluewings	Sangju Sangmu	Free
Lee Sang-hyeob	Midfielder	Korea University	FC Seoul	
Lee Sang-su	Forward	Daejeon Citizen		Free
Lee Se-hwan	Defender	Incheon Korail	Goyang Hi FC	Free
Lee Seok-hyun	Midfielder	Sun Moon University	Incheon United	
Lee Seong-min	Midfielder	Chonbuk National University	Bucheon FC 1995	
Lee Seung-gi	Midfielder	Gwangju FC	Jeonbuk Hyundai Motors	
Lee Seung-hyun (draft)	Midfielder	Jeonbuk Hyundai Motors	Sangju Sangmu	Free
Lee Seung-won	Defender	Daejeon Citizen		Free
Lee Seung-yeoul	Forward	(Japan) Gamba Osaka	Seongnam Ilhwa Chunma	
Lee Sun-ho	Defender	Suwon FC		Free
Lee Sung-gil	Forward	Goyang Hi FC		Free
Lee Sung-hyun	Defender	Hanmin University	Gangwon FC	
Lee Sung-jae	Forward	Pohang Steelers	Suwon FC	Free
Lee Wan	Defender	Jeonnam Dragons	Ulsan Hyundai	Free
Lee Wan-hee	Forward	Goyang KB Kookmin Bank	FC Anyang	
Lee Won-jae (draft)	Defender	Pohang Steelers	Korean Police	Free
Lee Won-kyu (draft)	Midfielder	Busan IPark	Seoul FC Martyrs	Free
Lee Yo-han	Defender	Busan IPark	Seongnam Ilhwa Chunma	
Lee Yong	Defender	Gwangju FC	Jeju United	
Lee Yong-seung	Midfielder	Busan Transportation Corporation	Jeonnam Dragons	Free
Lee Yoon-eui	Defender	Gangwon FC	Bucheon FC 1995	Free
Lee Yoon-ho	Defender	Gangwon FC		Free
Lee Youn-kyu	Goalkeeper	Daegu FC	Chungju Hummel	Free
Lee Young-deok	Midfielder	Dongguk University	Chungju Hummel	
Lee Young-gyun	Defender	Suwon FC	Gyeongju KHNP	
Lim Chae-min	Defender	Yeungnam University	Seongnam Ilhwa Chunma	
Lim Chang-kyun	Midfielder	Kyung Hee University	Bucheon FC 1995	
Lim Dong-gun	Defender	Seongnam Ilhwa Chunma	Incheon Korail	Free
Lim Jong-eun	Defender	Seongnam Ilhwa Chunma	Jeonnam Dragons	
Ma Chul-jun	Defender	Jeonbuk Hyundai Motors	Gwangju FC	
Ma Hyun-jun	Midfielder	Daeshin High School	FC Anyang	
Ma Sang-hoon	Defender	Gangwon FC		Free
Min Byung-jun	Midfielder	Chungju Hummel		Free
Min Hoon-gi	Midfielder	Ulsan Hyundai		Free
(Montenegro) Bogdan Milić	Forward	Gwangju FC	Suwon FC	Free
Mo Kyung-joo	Defender	Hannam University	Jeonbuk Hyundai Motors	
Moon Byung-woo	Midfielder	Incheon Korail	Gangwon FC	Free
Moon Dae-seong	Forward	Ulsan Hyundai	Hwaseong FC	Free
Moon Dong-ju	Forward	Daegu University	FC Seoul	
Moon Du-yun	Midfielder	Gwangju FC	Cheongju Jikji	Free
Moon Jung-joo	Midfielder	Sun Moon University	Chungju Hummel	
Moon Ki-han (draft)	Midfielder	FC Seoul	Korean Police	Free
Moon Kyung-min	Midfielder	Gangwon FC		Free
Mun Jin-yong	Defender	Kyung Hee University	Jeonbuk Hyundai Motors	
Na Byung-hwan	Defender	Gangwon FC		Free
Nam Dae-sik	Defender	Konkuk University	Chungju Hummel	
Nam Il-woo	Midfielder	Incheon United	(Japan) Giravanz Kitakyushu	
Nam In-woo	Midfielder	Suwon FC		Free
Nam Seol-hyun	Midfielder	Gyeongnam FC		Free
Namgung Woong	Defender	Seongnam Ilhwa Chunma	Gangwon FC	Free
Namkung Do	Forward	Seongnam Ilhwa Chunma	FC Anyang	
Noh Dae-ho	Midfielder	Kwangwoon University	Bucheon FC 1995	
Noh Haeng-seok	Defender	Gwangju FC	Daegu FC	Free
Noh Hyung-goo	Midfielder	Suwon Samsung Bluewings		Free
Noh Sung-chan	Midfielder	Jeju United	Cheonan City	Free
Noh Yong-hun	Midfielder	Daejeon Citizen		Free
Oh Beom-seok (draft)	Defender	Suwon Samsung Bluewings	Korean Police	Free
Oh Bong-jin	Defender	Jeju United	Daejeon Citizen	
Oh Byoung-min	Defender	Gyeongnam FC	Cheongju Jikji	Free
Oh Jae-hyeok	Defender	Cheonan City	Bucheon FC 1995	Free
Oh Jae-suk	Defender	Gangwon FC	(Japan) Gamba Osaka	
Oh Jong-cheol	Defender	Jeonbuk Hyundai Motors	Chungju Hummel	Free
Oh Ju-hyun	Defender	Daegu FC	Jeju United	Free
Oh Min-yeop	Defender	Myongji University	Chungju Hummel	
Oh Se-ryong	Defender	Suwon FC		Free
Oh Won-jong	Midfielder	Gangwon FC		Free
Park Byeong-ju	Defender	Jeju United	Gwangju FC	
Park Byung-won	Midfielder	Goyang KB Kookmin Bank	FC Anyang	
Park Chang-heon	Midfielder	Gyeongnam FC		Free
Park Chung-hyo	Goalkeeper	Yonsei University	Gyeongnam FC	
Park Dae-geun	Defender	Chungju Hummel		Free
Park Deuk-hyun	Defender	Chungju Hummel		Free
Park Dong-hyuk	Defender	(China) Dalian Shide	Ulsan Hyundai	
Park Dong-sin	Midfielder	Kyungwoon University	Gangwon FC	
Park Gi-dong	Forward	Gwangju FC	Jeju United	
Park Gun-hee	Goalkeeper	Gangneung City	Bucheon FC 1995	Free
Park Gyung-ik (loan)	Defender	Ulsan Hyundai	Hyundai Mipo Dockyard	
Park Han-bin	Defender	Seoul United	Gangwon FC	
Park Hee-do	Midfielder	FC Seoul	Jeonbuk Hyundai Motors	
Park Hee-seong	Forward	Korea University	FC Seoul	
Park Ho-jin	Goalkeeper	Gwangju FC	Gangwon FC	Free
Park Jae-bum	Forward	Gangwon FC		Free
Park Jae-hong	Defender	Yonsei University	Bucheon FC 1995	
Park Jeong-sik	Midfielder	Goyang KB Kookmin Bank	FC Anyang	
Park Ji-hoon	Midfielder	Cheongju University	Gangwon FC	
Park Jin-ok	Defender	Jeju United	Daejeon Citizen	Free
Park Jin-soo	Midfielder	Gyeongnam FC	Chungju Hummel	Free
Park Joon-gang	Defender	Sangji University	Busan IPark	
Park Ju-sung	Midfielder	(Japan) Vegalta Sendai	Gyeongnam FC	
Park Ju-won	Goalkeeper	Hongik University	Daejeon Citizen	
Park Jun-hyuk	Goalkeeper	Daegu FC	Jeju United	
Park Jun-seung	Midfielder	Suwon Samsung Bluewings	Korean Police	Free
Park Jun-tae	Forward	Incheon United	Jeonnam Dragons	
Park Ki-suh	Midfielder	Goyang Hi FC		Free
Park Kyung-min	Midfielder	Dongshin University	Jeonnam Dragons	
Park Min	Defender	Gwangju FC	Gangwon FC	Free
Park Min-keun	Midfielder	Daejeon Citizen		Free
Park Moon-ho	Midfielder	Hanzhong University	Gangwon FC	
Park Se-young	Forward	Seongnam Ilhwa Chunma	Gimhae City	Free
Park Seong-jin	Forward	Goyang KB Kookmin Bank	FC Anyang	
Park Seung-il (loan)	Forward	Ulsan Hyundai	Jeonnam Dragons	
Park Su-chang	Midfielder	Daegu FC	Chungju Hummel	Free
Park Sun-ju	Defender	Yonsei University	Pohang Steelers	
Park Sung-ho	Forward	Gwangju Gwangsan	Ulsan Hyundai	
Park Sung-jae	Midfielder	Gyeongnam FC	Seoul United	Free
Park Tae-su	Defender	Incheon United	Daejeon Citizen	
Park Woo-hyun	Defender	Gangwon FC		Free
Park Yo-han	Defender	Gwangju FC		Free
Park Yong-ji	Forward	Chung-Ang University	Ulsan Hyundai	
Park Yong-jun	Midfielder	Sun Moon University	Suwon Samsung Bluewings	
Park Young-jun	Midfielder	Jeonnam Dragons		Free
Roh Young-gyun	Midfielder	Boin High School	FC Seoul	
(Romania) Ianis Zicu	Forward	Pohang Steelers	Gangwon FC	
Ryoo Hyung-ryul	Defender	Goyang Hi FC		Free
Seo Dae-won	Defender	Chungju Hummel		Free
Seo Dong-wook	Forward	Daeshin High School	Bucheon FC 1995	
Seong Seung-hwan	Midfielder	Suwon FC		Free
Shim Young-sung (draft)	Forward	Jeju United	FC Pocheon	Free
Shin Dong-hyuk	Midfielder	Incheon United		Free
Shin Hyun-gook	Forward	Goyang Hi FC		Free
Sim Jae-myung	Forward	Seongnam Ilhwa Chunma		Free
Sim Woo-yeon	Defender	Jeonbuk Hyundai Motors	Seongnam Ilhwa Chunma	
Sin Hak-seob	Midfielder	Jeonbuk Hyundai Motors		Free
Sin Min-seok	Defender	Suwon FC		Free
Son Jae-young	Midfielder	Soongsil University	Gyeongnam FC	
Son Seol-min (loan)	Midfielder	Jeonnam Dragons	Gyeongju KHNP	
Son Si-hun	Defender	Soongsil University	Suwon FC	
Son Yang-gwon	Midfielder	Suwon FC		Free
Song Chi-hoon	Midfielder	Kwangwoon University	Bucheon FC 1995	
Song Dong-jin	Goalkeeper	Pohang Steelers		Free
Song Han-ki	Defender	Goyang KB Kookmin Bank	Seongnam Ilhwa Chunma	
Song Je-heon	Forward	Daegu FC	Jeonbuk Hyundai Motors	
Song Ji-yong	Goalkeeper	Jeonnam Dragons	Asan United	Free
Song Seung-ju (draft)	Defender	FC Seoul	Korean Police	Free
Song Won-jae	Defender	Hyundai Mipo Dockyard	Bucheon FC 1995	Free
Song Yoo-geol (draft)	Goalkeeper	Gangwon FC	Korean Police	Free
(Serbia) Milan Bubalo	Forward	(Serbia) FK Hajduk Kula	Gyeongnam FC	
(Serbia) Miloš Bosančić	Midfielder	(Czech Republic) Slovan Liberec	Gyeongnam FC	
(Serbia) Sreten Sretenović	Defender	(Serbia) FK Partizan	Gyeongnam FC	
(Serbia) Zoran Rendulić	Defender	Pohang Steelers	(China) Shenyang Shenbei	
Tae Hyun-chan	Midfielder	Gyeongnam FC	Hyundai Mipo Dockyard	Free
(Uzbekistan) Server Djeparov	Midfielder	(Saudi Arabia) Al-Shabab	Seongnam Ilhwa Chunma	
Yang Dong-hyup	Midfielder	Mokpo City	Chungju Hummel	
Yang Han-been	Goalkeeper	Gangwon FC	Seongnam Ilhwa Chunma	Free
Yang Jin-woong	Goalkeeper	University of Ulsan	Bucheon FC 1995	
Yang Sang-min (draft)	Defender	Suwon Samsung Bluewings	Korean Police	Free
Yang Se-woon	Midfielder	Nambu University	Gwangju FC	
Yang Yun-heok	Defender	Gangwon FC	FC Pocheon	
Yeo Hyo-jin	Defender	Busan IPark	Goyang Hi FC	Free
Yeo Myeong-yong	Goalkeeper	Busan Transportation Corporation	Goyang Hi FC	
Yeom Ho-deok	Midfielder	Gimhae City	FC Anyang	Free
Yeon Jei-min	Defender	Hannam University	Suwon Samsung Bluewings	
Yoo Byoung-woon	Defender	Daejeon Citizen		Free
Yoo Dong-min	Forward	Gwangju FC	Gyeongju KHNP	Free
Yoo Hyun (draft)	Goalkeeper	Incheon United	Korean Police	Free
Yoo Jun-bong	Midfielder	Seongnam Ilhwa Chunma		Free
Yoo Jun-soo	Forward	Incheon United	Gyeongju KHNP	Free
Yoo Jun-young	Midfielder	Kyung Hee University	Bucheon FC 1995	
Yoo Man-ki	Forward	Suwon FC	Goyang Hi FC	
Yoo Sang-hee	Defender	FC Seoul		Free
Yoo Woo-ram	Defender	Daejeon Citizen	Mokpo City	Free
Yoon Bit-garam	Midfielder	Seongnam Ilhwa Chunma	Jeju United	
Yoon Ju-il	Defender	Suwon FC		Free
Yoon Jun-ha	Forward	Incheon United	Daejeon Citizen	Free
Yoon Jung-min	Defender	Ulsan Hyundai		Free
Yoon Min-ho	Midfielder	Gwangju FC		Free
Yoon Pyung-guk	Goalkeeper	Incheon University	Incheon United	
Yoon Si-ho	Defender	FC Seoul	Jeonnam Dragons	Free
Yoon Won-il (1983)	Defender	Pohang Steelers	Hyundai Mipo Dockyard	Free
Yoon Won-il (1986) (loan)	Defender	Jeju United	Daejeon Citizen	
You Jae-won	Forward	Korea University	Gangwon FC	
Youn Sung-woo (loan)	Midfielder	FC Seoul	Goyang Hi FC	
Yoo Ji-hoon (draft)	Defender	Busan IPark	Sangju Sangmu	Free
Yoo Ji-no	Defender	Seongnam Ilhwa Chunma	Busan IPark	
Yoo Ji-no	Defender	Jeonnam Dragons	Seongnam Ilhwa Chunma	
Yu Su-cheol	Defender	Busan IPark		Free
Yun Il-rok	Midfielder	Gyeongnam FC	FC Seoul	
Yun Suk-young	Defender	Jeonnam Dragons	(England) Queens Park Rangers	
Yun Yeong-no	Midfielder	Busan IPark		Free
