= Ju Se-jong =

South Korean footballer (born 1990)

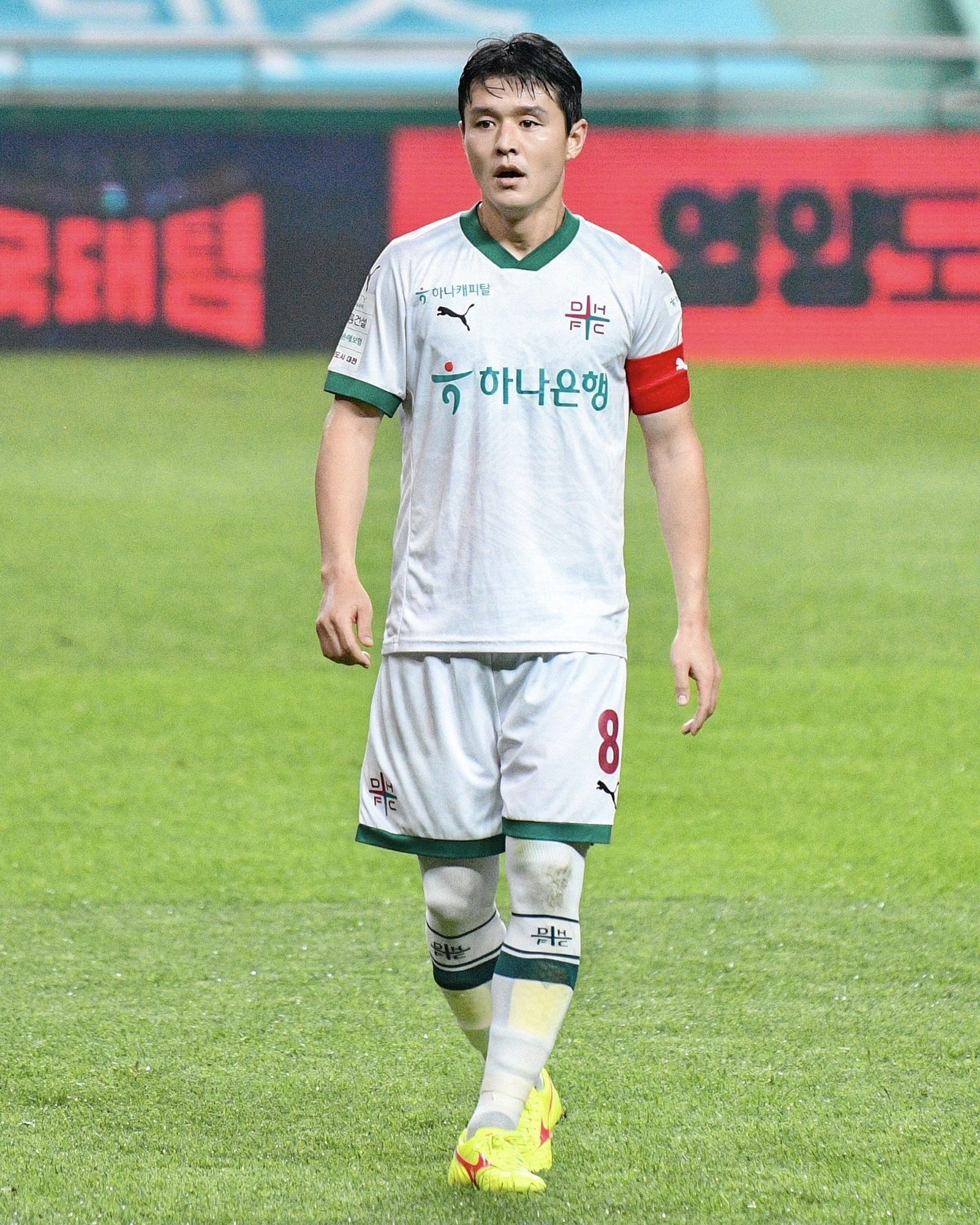
- Ju in 2024

Personal information
- Full name: Ju Se-jong
- Date of birth: 30 October 1990 (age 36)
- Place of birth: Anyang, Gyeonggi, South Korea
- Height: 1.76 m (5 ft 9 in)
- Position: Midfielder

Team information
- Current team: Gwangju FC
- Number: 8

Youth career
- 2006–2008: Nunggok High School
- 2009–2011: Konkuk University

Senior career*
Years	Team	Apps	(Gls)
2012–2015	Busan IPark	58	(5)
2016–2020	FC Seoul	90	(5)
2018–2019	→ Asan Mugunghwa (draft)	40	(3)
2021–2022	Gamba Osaka	27	(0)
2022	→ Daejeon Hana Citizen (loan)	17	(0)
2023–2024	Daejeon Hana Citizen	68	(2)
2025-	Gwangju FC	40	(0)

International career^{‡}
2011	South Korea U23	0	(0)
2015–	South Korea	29	(1)
- * Club domestic league appearances and goals as of 4 August 2026 ‡ National team caps and goals as of 8 January 2023

- Ju Se-jong
- Hangul: 주세종
- Hanja: 朱世鐘
- RR: Ju Sejong
- MR: Chu Sejong

Ju Se-jong (Korean: 주세종; Korean pronunciation: [tɕu.se̞.dʑoŋ]; born 30 October 1990) is a South Korean football player who plays as a midfielder for K League 1 club Gwangju FC.

== Club career ==
=== Busan IPark ===
Ju made his league debut for Busan IPark as a substitute in 6–0 defeat away to FC Seoul on 21 July 2012. His first full start came almost two years later in a league match against Gyeongnam on 4 May 2014. Ju scored his first goal for the club in an FA Cup game against Suwon City on 16 July 2014, which IPark went on to win 3–2 after extra time. His first league goal came a month later in a 4–2 victory over Seongnam FC. Ju became a regular starter and key player for IPark in the second half of the 2014 K League 1 season. He finished the season with five assists, the most at the club, and was named in the weekly K League 1 'Best Eleven' on three occasions.

Ju continued to be a regular starter in the 2015 season, as IPark were relegated into the K League 2.

=== FC Seoul ===
Ju joined FC Seoul on 8 January 2016. On 2 January 2021 Se-Jong was released following his contract running out.

== International career ==
Ju made his debut for the Korean national team on 11 June 2015, appearing as a substitute in a 3–0 victory over UAE. He was later selected in the squad for the East Asian Cup. He made one appearance, starting in the 1–1 draw with Japan, as Korea won the tournament.

In May 2018 he was named in South Korea's preliminary 28 man squad for the 2018 FIFA World Cup in Russia. Ju started in Korea's second group game against Mexico, and appeared as a substitute in the final group game against Germany. In the sixth minute of injury time, Ju dispossessed Germany goalkeeper Manuel Neuer inside Korea's half and launched a 75-yard ball forward, which Son Heung-min converted to ensure a famous victory for Korea. Ju's assist was recorded as the second longest in World Cup history, behind Manuel Neuer himself, whose assist for Miroslav Klose against England in 2010 measured at 85-90 yards.

== Career statistics ==
=== Club ===
As of 26 October 2022

Club performance			League		Cup		Other		Continental		Total	
Season	Club	League	Apps	Goals	Apps	Goals	Apps	Goals	Apps	Goals	Apps	Goals
South Korea			League		KFA Cup		Play-offs		ACL		Total	
2012	Busan IPark	K League 1	1	0	0	0	—		—		1	0
2013	Busan IPark	K League 1	0	0	0	0	—		—		0	0
2014	Busan IPark	K League 1	22	2	3	1	—		—		25	3
2015	Busan IPark	K League 1	35	3	1	0	1	0	—		37	3
2016	FC Seoul	K League 1	30	4	4	1	—		9	1	43	6
2017	FC Seoul	K League 1	35	0	2	0	—		5	0	42	0
2018	Asan Mugunghwa (draft)	K League 2	19	1	1	0	—		—		20	1
2019	Asan Mugunghwa (draft)	K League 2	21	2	0	0	—		—		21	2
2019	FC Seoul	K League 1	9	1	—		—		—		9	1
2020	FC Seoul	K League 1	16	0	2	0	—		2	0	20	0
Japan			League		Emperor's Cup		League Cup		ACL		Total	
2021	Gamba Osaka	J1 League	22	0	3	0	0	0	0	0	25	0
2022	Gamba Osaka	J1 League	5	0	2	0	1	0	—		8	0
South Korea			League		KFA Cup		Play-offs		ACL		Total	
2022	Daejeon Hana Citizen (loan)	K League 2	17	0	—		1	1	—		18	1
Career total			232	13	18	2	3	1	16	1	269	17

=== International goals ===
As of match played 1 June 2016. South Korea score listed first, score column indicates score after each Ju Se-jong goal.

International goals by date, venue, cap, opponent, score, result and competition
No.	Date	Venue	Cap	Opponent	Score	Result	Competition
1	1 June 2016	Red Bull Arena, Salzburg, Austria	4	Spain	1–5	1–6	Friendly

== Honours ==
=== Club ===
FC Seoul

- K League 1: 2016

Asan Mugunghwa

- K League 2: 2018

=== International ===
South Korea

- EAFF East Asian Cup: 2015, 2017, 2019
