= Park Jae-hong =

- Hangul: 박재홍
- RR: Bak Jaehong
- MR: Pak Chaehong

Park Jae-hong is a Korean name consisting of the family name Park and the given name Jae-hong. It may refer to:

- Park Jae-hong (baseball) (born 1973)
- Park Jae-hong (footballer, born 1978)
- Park Jae-hong (footballer, born 1990)
