= KNPA =

KNPA can refer to:

- National Police Agency (South Korea), the domestic police force of South Korea
- Naval Air Station Pensacola, a United States Navy base located near Warrington, Florida
