= National Police Agency (South Korea) =

South Korean national law enforcement organization

Korean National Police Agency 대한민국 경찰청
- Emblem of the Korean National Police Agency

- Seal of the Korean National Police Agency

- Flag of the Korean National Police Agency
- Common name: Korean National Police
- Abbreviation: KNPA

Agency overview
- Formed: 1 August 1991; 35 years ago
- Preceding agency: National Security Headquarters
- Employees: 126,227 (2020)
- Annual budget: ₩12.37 trillion (2023)
- Legal personality: Governmental: Government agency

Jurisdictional structure
- National agency: South Korea
- Operations jurisdiction: South Korea
- General nature: Local civilian police

Operational structure
- Headquarters: 97, Tongil-ro, Seodaemun, Seoul
- Agency executives: Yoon Hee-keun, Commissioner General; Kim Soo-hwan, deputy commissioner
- Parent agency: Ministry of the Interior and Safety
- Local police agencies: 18: Seoul Metropolitan Police Agency; Busan Police Agency; Daegu Police Agency; Incheon Police Agency; Daejeon Police Agency; Gwangju Police Agency; Ulsan Police Agency; Sejong Special Self-Governing City Police Agency; Gyeonggi Provincial Police Agency; Gyeonggi Bukbu Provincial Police Agency; Gangwon Police Agency; North Chungcheong Police Agency; South Chungcheong Police Agency; North Jeolla Police Agency; South Jeolla Police Agency; North Gyeongsang Police Agency; South Gyeongsang Police Agency; Jeju Provincial Police Agency

Website
- Official website

Korean name
- Hangul: 경찰청
- Hanja: 警察廳
- RR: Gyeongchalcheong
- MR: Kyŏngch'alch'ŏng

The Korean National Police Agency (KNPA; Korean: 경찰청), also known as the Korean National Police (KNP), is one of the national police organizations in South Korea. It is run under the Ministry of the Interior and Safety and is headquartered in Seodaemun, Seoul. The agency is divided into 18 local police agencies, including the Seoul Metropolitan Police Agency. Local police agencies are not independent of the national police.

The origins of Korean Police organization date to the Police Department of Provisional Government of the Republic of Korea. After the division of Korea in 1945, the United States Army Military Government in Korea (USAMGIK) created the Police Administration Bureau under its command, and established a police department in every province, relying upon the police force from the colonial period to maintain law and order. A Bureau of National Security was established in 1948 before its demise in 1974.

The present-day agency was created in 1991, reshuffling the National Security Headquarters in the Ministry of Home Affairs (Korean: 내무부 치안본부) to the National Police Agency.

== History ==
=== Before 1945 ===
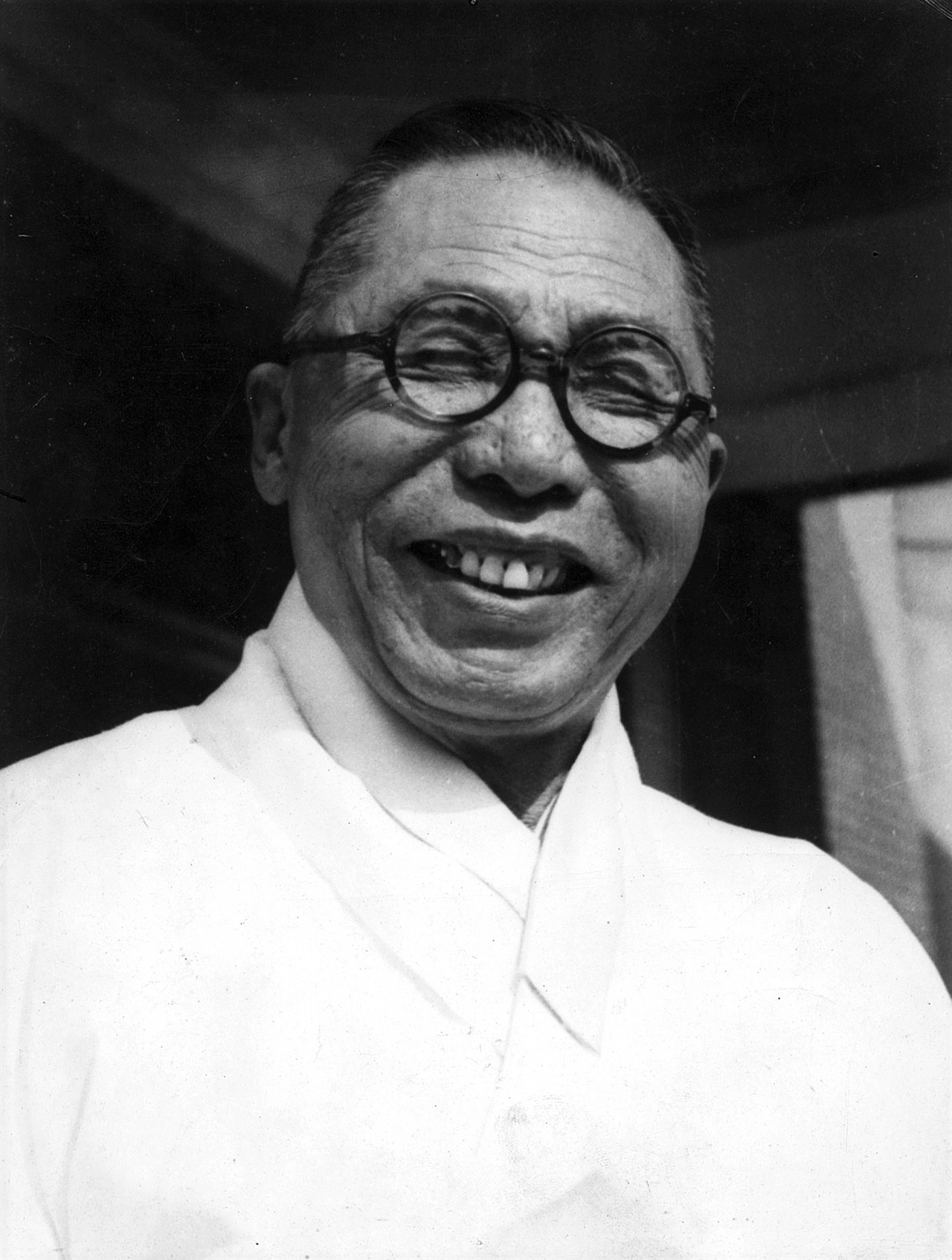
Kim Gu, the first Commissioner General of the Police Bureau of Provisional Government

The spiritual origins of South Korean law enforcement organization lie in the Police Department (Korean: 경무국) of the Provisional Government of the Republic of Korea. The bylaws of the Korean Provisional Government promulgated on April 25, 1919, stipulated the roles and responsibilities of the Police Bureau under the Provisional Government. The first Commissioner General of the Police Bureau was Kim Gu, who laid the foundation for the Korean police force. Police of the Provisional Government guarded key figures in the government and government office building, as well as maintaining public security in the oversea Koreans society.

In 1923, Kim Gu established the neighborhood patrol force (Korean: 의경대) in the Shanghai group of overseas Koreans. Its mission was to maintain public security in the Korean society of Shanghai. This organization was later renamed to the Korean Patriotic Organization, a secret organization that aimed to assassinate prominent Japanese figures of the Empire of Japan.

=== 1945–1948: Period of the Police Administration Department ===
On August 15, 1945, after subsequent liberation of Korea and division of Korea, the United States Army established the United States Army Military Government in Korea (USAMGIK). Under the USAMGIK government, the Police Administration Bureau (Korean: 경무부; Hanja: 警務部) was established, directed by Lawrence E. Schick, and established a police department in every province on 21 October. This police organization was formed with 2,000 officers, most were former police in the colonial government. The first Korean Director of the National Police Department was Chough Pyung-ok, with his term beginning on 21 October.

In 1946, the Police Administration Bureau (Korean: 경무부; Hanja: 警務部) was promoted into the Department of Police Affairs. In March 5, the police department launched the Railway Provincial Police Division, which was eventually abolished in 1949. During this period, Korean police were deployed to conflicts such as the Autumn Uprising of 1946 and the Jeju uprising between 1948 and 1949. The First Republic of Korea was founded on 15 August 1948 and Syngman Rhee became the first president of South Korea following the May 1948 general election. The Bureau of National Security (Korean: 치안국) is established under the Minister of the Internal Affair.

=== 1948–1974: Period of the Bureau of National Security ===
On 14 November 1948, the Bureau of National Security was established after the transfer of power from the Police Administration Bureau. On November 18, the police agency is established in every South Korean city and province.

When the Korean War broke out in 1950, South Korean policemen were engaged in the war. The Police Battle Force headquarters was established in Taebaek and Jiri Mountain. On 25 June 1950, around 3:00 AM, a police officer of Gangneung city, Jeon Daeuk, became the first combat casualty of the Korean War. In the whole period of the war, 10,618 officers were killed and 6,760 were injured. Some police engaged in wartime massacres, like Bodo League massacre. Kim Tae Sun, the chief of the Seoul Metropolitan Police, admitted to personally executing at least 12 "communists and suspected communists" after the outbreak of the war.

After the Korean War armistice was signed on 27 July 1953. On 14 December 1953, the Policeman's Duties Execution Law was established, which regulated the duties of South Korean policemen.

In 1955, the National Institute of Scientific Inspection Service is established, now known as the National Forensic Service. In 1967, the Combat Police Squads are launched in every city and province.

In 1972, the Police Special Academy was upgraded into the National Police College (not to be confused with the Korean National Police University).

On 24 December 1974, due to the new Government Organization Act, the Commissioner General of the Headquarter of National Security(Korean: 치안본부; Hanja: 治安本部) was upgraded to the status of a government position and elevated the head of department into the position of a government official.

=== 1974–1991: Period of the National Security Headquarters ===
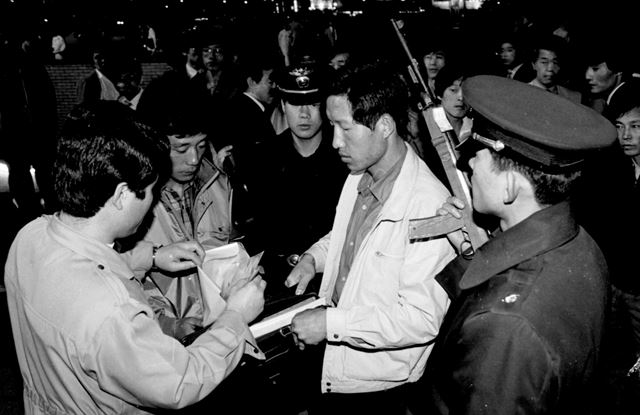
Police inspect an ID card at a checkpoint in 1975.

On 24 December 1974, the Bureau of National Security was upgraded to the Headquarter of National Security, independent to the Minister of Internal Affairs. At the same time, as part of the reforms for the organizations of the National Security Headquarter, police abolished the Director General for Public Peace and Defense and installed the first, the second, the third department. In this period, South Korea president Park Chung-hee assumed dictatorial power in the October Restoration and took emergency measures. Korean police clashed with leading opposition members and protesters, like in the Bu-Ma Democratic Protests.

On 26 October 1979, Park Chung-hee, the third President of South Korea, was assassinated. On 12 December, Republic of Korea Army Major General Chun Doo-hwan, commander of the Security Command, seized power in the coup d'état of December Twelfth. Next year, military power forced the Cabinet to extend martial law to the whole nation. In the city of Gwangju, protestors gathered to protest against the authoritarian government in the Gwangju Uprising. Initially, the South Korean police were deployed against the protests. An Boeng-ha, Commissioner General of the Jeonnam Provincial Police Agency, rejected the order of the military regime to shoot citizens. He was removed from his position and tortured by the Army Counterintelligence Corps (today the Defense Security Command).

In 1982, police increased the number of security personnel by 3,292 due to the dismissal of curfews, abolished the National Police College Vice President system, and replaced the Deputy Dean of the National Police College with the Director General of the Faculty, Superintendent General.

On January 21, 1984, the first 12 Combat Police Corps are recruited. The same day, 88 Olympic Expressway (today Gwangju–Daegu Expressway) police personnel were recruited. In 1987, this combat squard are increased to five special mobile police forces, two mobile police forces and one airport defense company.

In 1987, Park Jong-chol, the president of the student council in the linguistics department of Seoul National University, was detained during an investigation into against Chun Doo-hwan's dictatorship and the aftermath of the 1980 Gwangju Massacre activities. Park refused to confess the whereabouts of one of his fellow activists. During the interrogation, authorities used waterboarding techniques to torture him, eventually leading to his death on 14 January 1987. Information surrounding the events of Park Jong-chol's death was initially suppressed. However, the Catholic Priests Association for Justice (CPAJ), revealed the truth to the public on 18 May, further inflaming public sentiment. CPAJ planned a June 10 demonstration in his honor. Due to this movement, called the June Struggle, the military regime of President Chun Doo-hwan and Roh Tae-woo acceded to the key demands of direct presidential elections and restoration of civil liberties.

In 1990, due to Presidential Decree No. 12931, recruitment of police officers was increased by 2,133 including 1,256 C3 patrol officers.

=== After 1991: Organized as the National Police Agency ===
On 24 July 1991, as proclaimed by Presidential Decree No. 13431, the National Police Agency and its affiliated organizations were organized. On 26 July, the revised Government Organization Act (Law No. 4268) legislated the Police Law (Law No. 4369), organized the National Police Agency and other affiliated organizations (Presidential Decree No. 13431), regulated operations of the Police Committee (Presidential Decree No. 13432) and adjusted the capacity of police organizations. On 31 July, the Korea Coast Guard was organized by Presidential Decree No. 13431. The Headquarter of National Security was renamed to the National Police Agency on 1 August.

In 1995, police substation and police box names were integrated into police offices. The National Police Agency and the affiliated organizations were recognized by Presidential Decree No. 14823.

On 8 August 1996, the National Police Agency and the affiliated organizations were reorganized (Presidential Decree No. 15136) in accordance with the transference of the position of the National Maritime Police Agency to the Ministry of the Maritime Affairs and Fisheries.

On 29 September 2000, the Korean National Police Agency established the Anti Cyber Terrorism Center, divided into four teams: the Co-operative Operation Team, the Report and Warning Team, the Inspection Service Team, and the Skill-Development Team.

On 27 March 2001, in order to enforce the Regulation on the National Police Agency and affiliated organization, Administration Order No. 128, the Incheon International Airport Police Squad under the Incheon Metropolitan Police Agency was established. Also, the Gimpo International Airport Police Squad was renamed to the Gimpo Airport Police Squad of Seoul Metropolitan Police Agency.

In 2006, Jeju Province became a Self-Governing Province. For this reason, the Korean National Police Agency and the affiliated organizations (Presidential Decree No. 19588) was recognized. Operation regulations (Ministry of Government Affairs and Home Affairs Decree No. 338) were amended. The Jeju Local Police Agency was changed to Jeju Special Self-Governed Local Police Agency according to the Jeju Special Self-Governing Law.

In 2013, The Korean government organized the National Police Agency and the affiliated organizations by the Presidential Decree No. 24972. The Government Officials Act was enforced (No. 11530, enforced on 12 December 2012) that abolished contracted public officials etc. from the occupational categories of public officials and reduced the scope of public officials in special services. This change was reflected in the Organization of the National Police Agency and the affiliated organizations.

== Organization ==
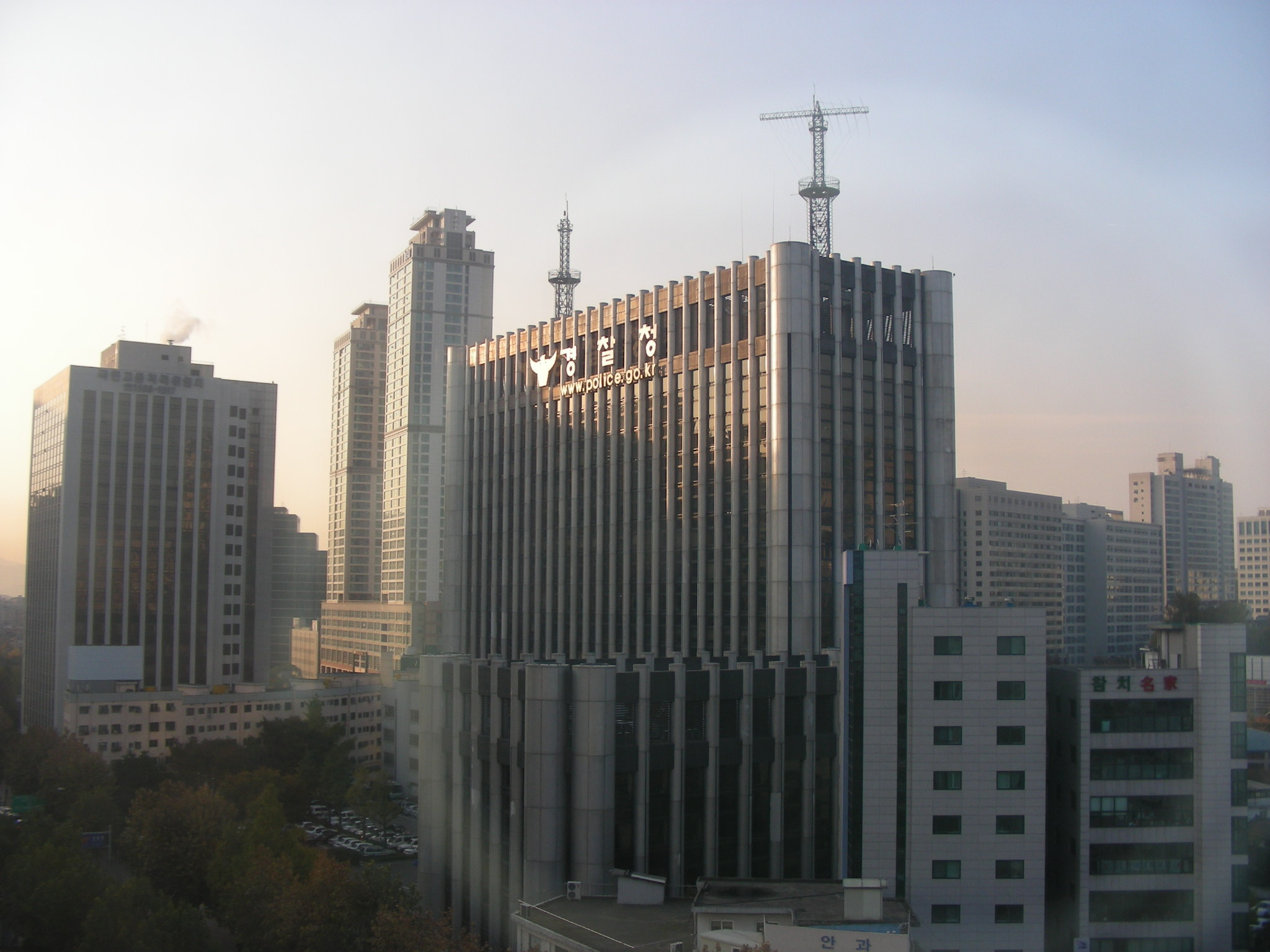
Korean National Police Agency Building in Seodaemun-gu, Seoul

The Korean National Police Agency consists of one Deputy Commissioner General, eight bureaus, nine offices and thirty-two divisions. The Spokesperson (Director for Public Relations Division) is directly attached to the Commissioner General of the police. The nine offices are the Spokesperson's Office, the Planning and Coordination Office, the Police Administration and Human Resources Office, the Audit and Inspection Office, the ICT and Equipment Policy Office, the Scientific Investigation Office, and the Police Situation Control Center. The eight bureaus are Community Safety, Investigation Bureau, Traffic and Foreign Affairs Bureau, Public Security, Intelligence and National Security Bureaus.

Also, the Korean police have several affiliated institutions, including the Korean National Police University, Police Training Institute, Central Police Academy, Korean Police Investigation Academy and the National Police Hospital.

Korean National Police Agency organizational chart

Commissioner; General
Spokesman
Deputy; Commissioner; General
Police Situation; Control Center	Big Data; Policing Division
Public Safety; Bureau	Criminal; Investigation; Bureau	Cyber; Bureau	Traffic; Bureau	Public Security; Bureau	Intelligence; Bureau	National; Security; Bureau	Foreign Affairs; Bureau
Director General for Planning	Director General for Police; Administration	Director General for Audit and Inspection	Director General for ICT Management & Equipment	Director General for Scientific; Investigation Management

The Korean National Police is regionally divided over the 18 metropolitan cities and provinces, placing 255 stations, 518 precincts and 1,433 police boxes under metropolitan and provincial police agencies.

The regional headquarters are as follows:

- Seoul Metropolitan Police Agency
- Busan Metropolitan Police Agency
- Daegu Metropolitan Police Agency
- Incheon Metropolitan Police Agency
- Gwangju Metropolitan Police Agency
- Daejeon Metropolitan Police Agency
- Ulsan Metropolitan Police Agency
- Gyeonggi Bukbu Provincial Police Agency
- Gyeonggi Nambu Provincial Police Agency
- Gangwon Provincial Police Agency
- Chungbuk Provincial Police Agency
- Chungnam Provincial Police Agency
- Sejong Provincial Police Agency
- Jeonbuk Provincial Police Agency
- Jeonnam Provincial Police Agency
- Gyeongbuk Provincial Police Agency
- Gyeongnam Provincial Police Agency
- Jeju Special Self-Governing Provincial Police Agency

=== Academic organization ===
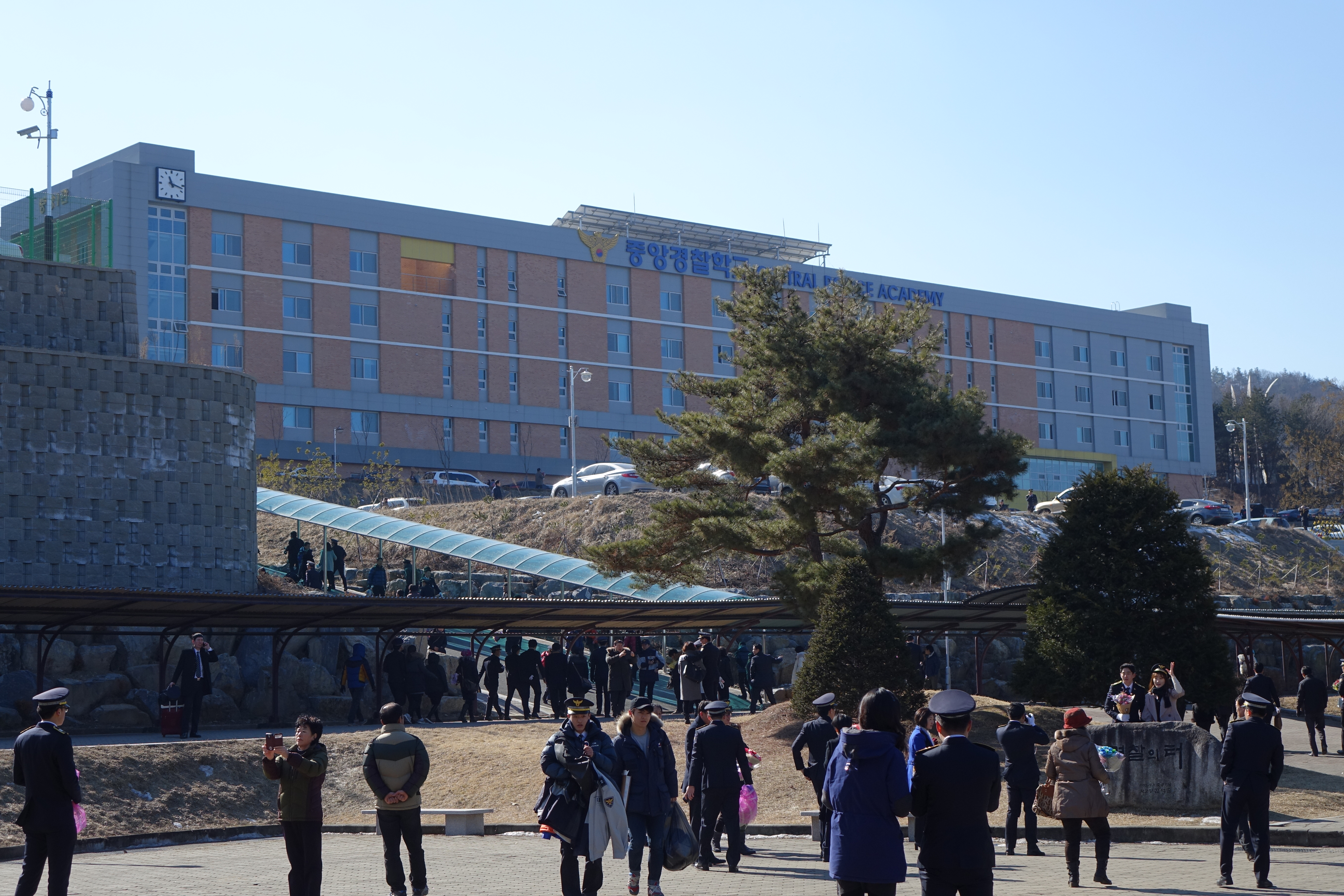
Central Police Academy is one of the freshmen police academic organizations.

The Korea Police Agency have an academic organization for law enforcement education, Korean National Police University. Before enrolling in the school, the National Police University provides freshmen with a two-week orientation program to help them understand the organization of the university and the police. Freshmen are given insights on the police and the police university by participating in introductory programs such as the university curriculum, campus life, and lectures titled "History of the Police and the Police University" and "Future-oriented Ways as a Police Officer". Four majors of police law, criminal investigation, police administration, and 30 credits need to be taken for each course.

Training is undertaken at the Central Police Academy and Police Human Resources Development Institute. The Central Police Academy is specialist academic organization for new police officers. New enrolled police officers of all genders complete a 34-week program. The Police Human Resources Development Institute, which was previously called the Police Comprehensive Academy, was split from the Police University in 1984. In 2018, the Police Comprehensive Academy was renamed to the Police Human Resources Development Institute.

The Korean Police Investigation Academy is an academic organization for police officers to undertake training for the investigation bureau. When freshman police officers enroll in the investigation bureau, they need to complete the 63-task course.

=== Special Operations Unit (SOU) ===
The KNP SOU (경찰특공대; 警察特攻隊), formerly known as KNP SWAT before it changed its name, is a specialized police tactical unit to perform dangerous operations. The unit's main mission is counter-terrorism, but it also can include serving high-risk arrest warrants, performing hostage rescue and/or armed intervention, and engaging heavily armed criminals.

- Seoul Police Agency (Unit 868): 4 squadrons
- Busan Police Agency (Unit 431): 1 squadron
- Daegu Police Agency: 1 squadron
- Incheon Police Agency (Unit 313): 1 squadron
- Gwangju Police Agency: 1 squadron
- Gyeonggi Bukbu Police Agency: 1 squadron
- Gyeonggi Nambu Police Agency: 1 squadron
- Chungnam (South Chungcheong) Police Agency: 1 squadron
- Jeonnam (South Jeolla) Police Agency: 1 squadron
- Gyeongnam (South Gyeongsang) Police Agency: 1 squadron
- Jeju Police Agency: 1 squadron

=== Tourist Police ===
The Korea Tourist Police of Seoul was launched in October 2013. Tourist Police offers diverse public order and security services for tourists. The Korea Tourist Police is affiliated with the Metropolitan Police Agencies in Seoul, Busan, and Incheon. As of 2019, Tourist Police centers were set up in the Seoul Myeongdong, Dongdaemun, and Itaewon, Busan Nampo-dong, Incheon International Airport.

=== Riot Police ===
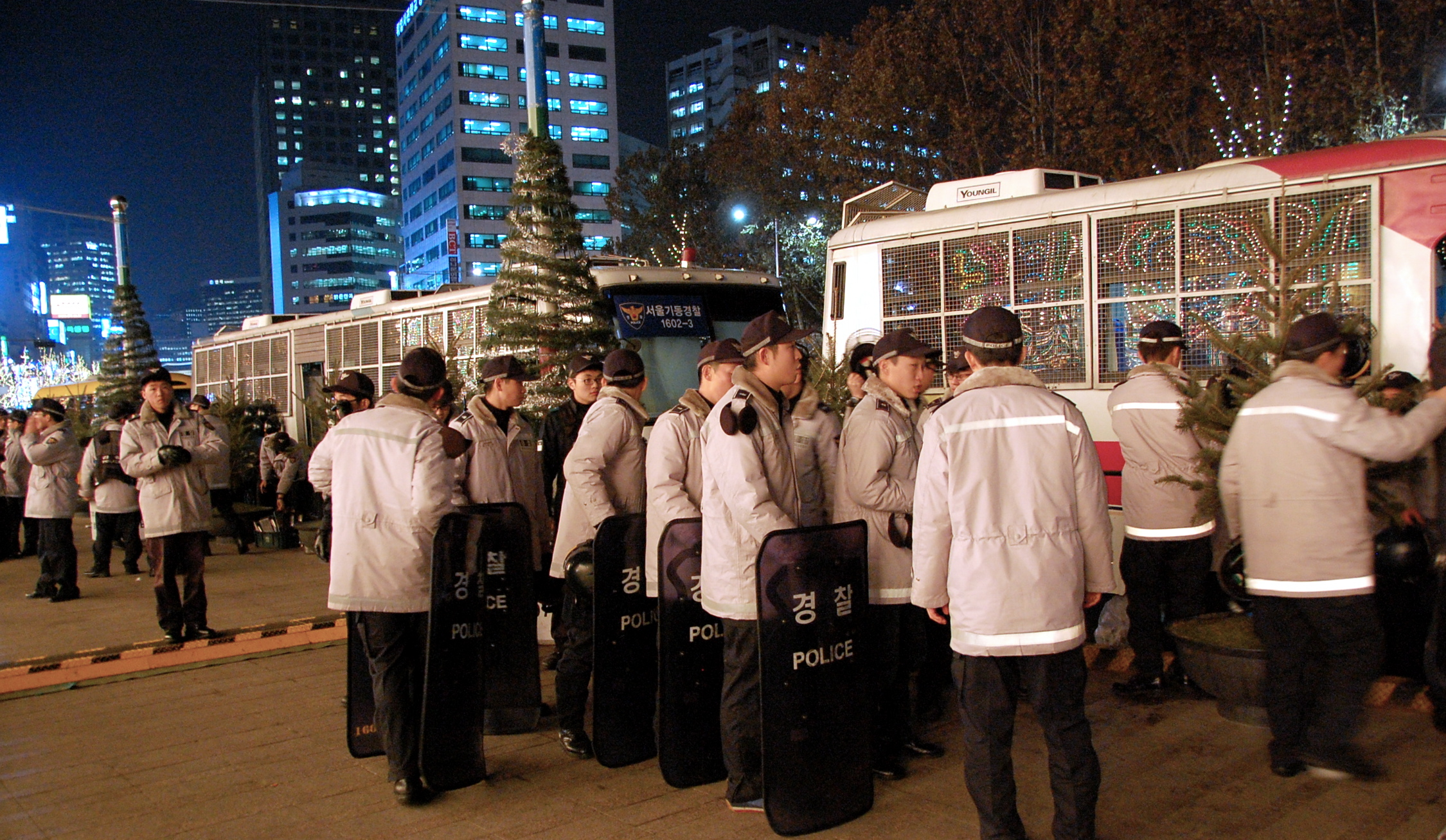
Riot Police officers deployed with riot shields in Seoul

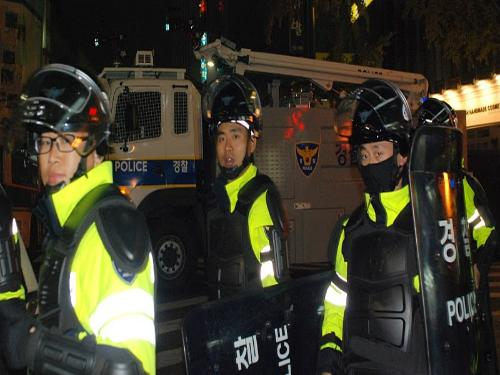
Riot Police officers with riot shields at the 2010 G20 meeting

This unit is the effective successor of the Complusory Service Police and the Auxiliary Police, originating from the 'Jik-Won Jung Dae'(Or literally the 'Sworn Officer Units' via rough translation) from the mid 90s when the government reformed the police after the gradual disbandment of the Planclothes units (Baekgoldan, 백골단) and similar units that were composed of police employees and normal officers. These units, after being temporarily sidelined from the front was re-established in 2008 by orders from Police high command.

These new units,called 경찰기동대 (riot police, or in direct translation, Mobile police), began to take over riot policing duties from the Compulsory Service officers and by the mid 2010s, with the complete disbandment of the Compulsory units many, if not a substantial number of riot units on the ground were either the newly established Riot Police and the Republic of Korea Auxiliary Police. However, the last batch of Auxiliary Officers were disbanded in 2023, thus giving the riot police free rein over its predecessors' responsibilities and capabilities. Much like their predecessors, many, if not all of those units were assigned directly to Municipal Police and the Provincial Police of each province and city.

HQ's and regional units are as follows:

- Seoul Metropolitan Police Agency: total 8 mobile brigades; including the congress guard
- Busan Metropolitan Police Agency: total 9 mobile brigades
- Daegu Metropolitan Police Agency: total 6 mobile brigades
- Incheon Metropolitan Police Agency: total 6 mobile brigades; including the anti-terror affairs and security unit
- Gwangju Metropolitan Police Agency: total 5 mobile brigades; 1 being a all-female unit
- Daejeon Metropolitan Police Agency: total 3 brigades
- Ulsan Metropolitan Police Agency: total 3 mobile brigades; with 1 transferred into an undercover unit
- Gyeonggi Bukbu Provincial Police Agency: total 6 brigades
- Gyeonggi Nambu Provincial Police Agency: total 15 mobile brigades
- Gangwon Provincial Police Agency: total 3 mobile brigades
- Chungbuk Provincial Police Agency: total 3 mobile brigades
- Chungnam Provincial Police Agency: total 4 mobile brigades
- Sejong Provincial Police Agency: total 3 mobile brigades
- Jeonbuk Provincial Police Agency: total 3 brigades; with 1 using the same headquarters with the SWAT team
- Jeonnam Provincial Police Agency: total 5 mobile brigades; with one assigned to gagau island
- Gyeongbuk Provincial Police Agency: total 5 mobile brigades; 1 assigned to the dokdo
- Gyeongnam Provincial Police Agency: total 4 mobile brigades
- Jeju Special Self-Governing Provincial Police Agency: total 4 brigades; with the majority being coastal units

=== Compulsory Service Police ===
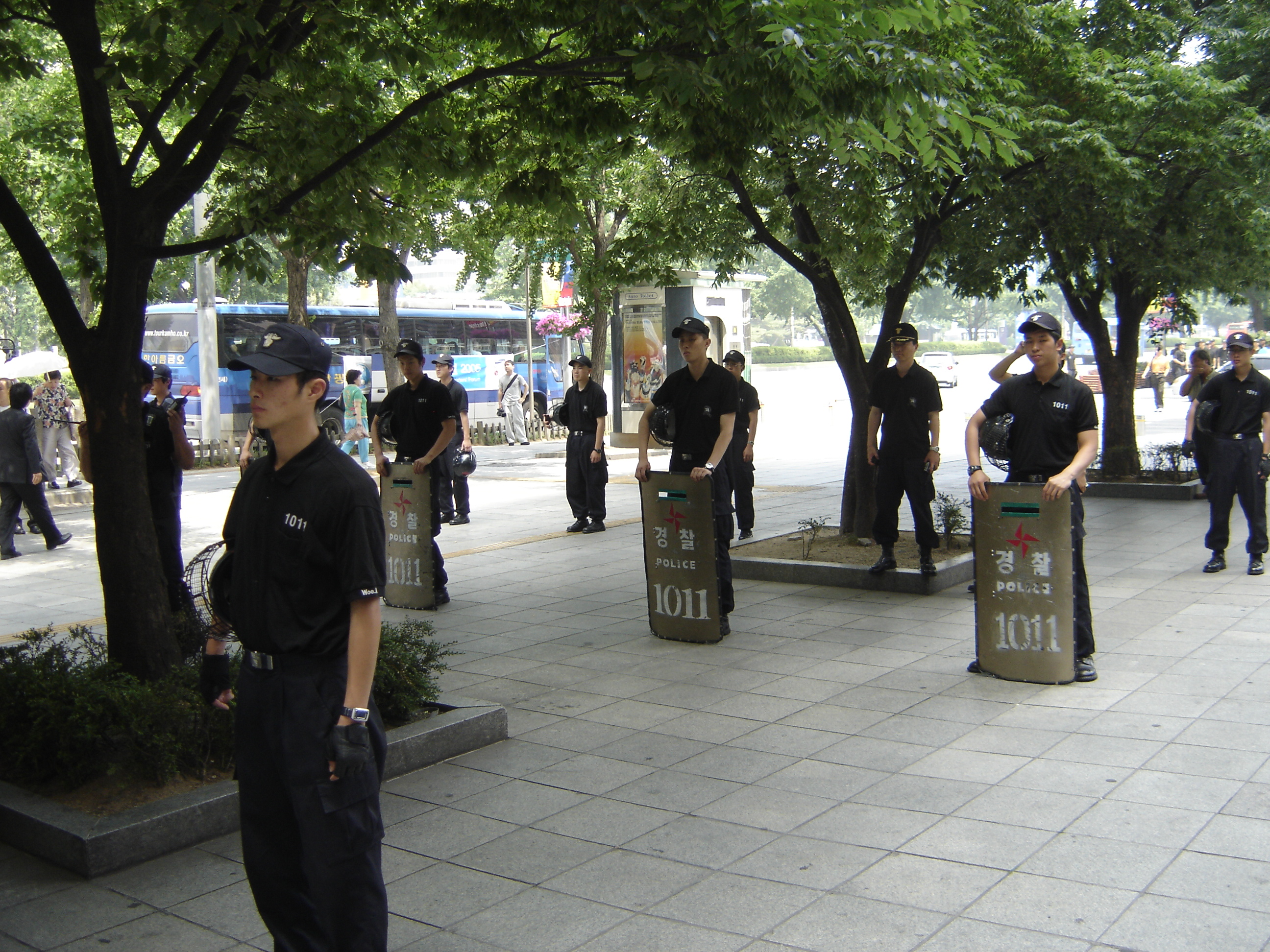
Compulsory Service Police of the SMPA with riot shields

The Compulsory Service Police division of the National Police Agency was an anti-espionage paramilitary unit of military conscripts, established in 1967 during the Third Republic. Its members primarily dealt with counterintelligence, but their duties were quickly expanded to include riot policing. Each battalion is assigned to a municipal police agency in the country. In their riot gear, they were once identified by their signature metal riot shields which are numbered such as "1001" or "1011", and on their helmets with the NPA emblem. Now, the police instead use modern tactical clear plastic shields and deploy high-powered water cannons to minimize civilian injuries. Two weeks of training are required for each draftee.

Instances of police brutality have in the past been raised against the South Korean anti-riot units in particular by the Asian Human Rights Commission, citing police actions of a "brutal and violent manner" that cause the deaths of protesters, including Jeon Young-Cheol on 24 November 2005. The South Korean President, Roh Moo Hyun, later apologised for this violence. The police force themselves reported that 117 officers were injured in a confrontation with 70 protesters, after being hit "with shards of broken bottles and flower vases". Injuries to riot police officers have themselves become reason for protest. One in every 53 officers was injured in 2005, with the number of injuries having increased to 893 from 331 in 2000. On 26 December 2011, 3,211 service officers were evacuated and the force was abolished on 25 September 2013. Relevant tasks, including the suppression of protests by the combat police, were transferred to the Republic of Korea Auxiliary Police.

== Symbol ==
The symbol of the Korean National Police (KNP), which was newly created on the occasion of the 60th anniversary of their founding in 2006, takes the shape of Steller's sea eagle flying up to the sky with holding the rose of Sharon. Steller's sea eagle, the scales on the neck, and the rose of Sharon represents "police", "balance" and "the state and the people" respectively.

On the shoulders of the eagle, there are a scale and a balance beam to configure the shape of balance, and stress "fairness." The taegeuk sign in the middle of the rose of Sharon is the origin of all things and signifies "the Republic of Korea and its people"

The badge consists of two overlapping circles. The lower circle with a Taegeuk surrounded by other five Taegeuks engraved represents Mugunghwa. Each part of the badge represents as follows: The front circle represents "the sun or light." The Mugunghwa represents "the nation and people." The back circle represents "the moon or shade."

== Issues and controversies ==
=== Human rights violations in protest and demonstration responses ===
The South Korean police have faced continuous criticism regarding human rights violations, particularly in the handling of protests and demonstrations. Notably, during the 2005 anti-KORUS FTA protests, excessive use of force by the police resulted in multiple injuries. In 2009, the Yongsan District 4 Demolition Site fire occurred when police intervention led to a fire during an eviction operation, causing five deaths and one injury.

Further allegations include mistreatment and abuse during police interrogations. The Baek Nam-gi incident in 2016, where a farmer died after being struck by a police water cannon during a protest, sparked significant public outrage and criticism of excessive police force.

=== Corruption and misconduct within the police force ===
Corruption within the police force has been a recurring issue. In 2014, a senior police official was arrested for allegedly accepting bribes, bringing attention to the extent of internal corruption within the organization. In 2021, allegations of collusion between the police and entertainment establishments in Gangnam raised public concerns about fairness and integrity within the police force.

These incidents highlight the limitations of internal monitoring systems and emphasize the need for institutional reforms.

=== Rigid organizational culture and inadequate whistleblower protection ===
The hierarchical and rigid organizational culture of the police force has been criticized for discouraging internal whistleblowing. There are claims that insufficient protections for whistleblowers make it difficult for officers to report corruption or misconduct. In 2018, a police officer who raised concerns about a superior’s misconduct allegedly faced retaliatory actions in the form of a punitive job reassignment.

=== Concerns over investigative fairness and political neutrality ===
The South Korean police have also faced scrutiny over political neutrality during investigations. Concerns have been raised about possible external pressure in politically sensitive cases. In 2019, the investigation involving Cho Kuk, the former Minister of Justice, became highly controversial, raising questions about impartiality and political interference.

=== Excessive use of force and abuse of authority ===
Excessive use of force by the police has been a recurring issue, particularly during protests and demonstrations. Several cases have been reported where the use of disproportionate force resulted in civilian casualties. Such incidents have drawn criticism from international human rights organizations.

=== Controversy over the expansion of female police officers ===
As part of gender equality initiatives, the South Korean government has promoted the recruitment of female police officers. Efforts to increase gender diversity in public service have led to a significant rise in the proportion of female officers, growing from approximately 2% in the early 2000s to over 12% by 2020.

==== Background of the controversy ====
Although the policy was initially aimed at promoting gender equality, controversies emerged regarding deployment and operational capacity. One of the most debated issues is the relaxation of physical fitness requirements for female applicants. Critics argue that this policy undermines fairness in the recruitment process, as women are subjected to less stringent physical tests than their male counterparts.

Additionally, concerns have been raised about female officers' ability to respond effectively in the field. After the 2016 Seocho-dong public-toilet murder case, public awareness regarding crimes against women increased, leading to an expanded deployment of female officers. However, questions were raised regarding the physical capability of female officers in handling violent situations.

The issue intensified following the 2019 Seoul Daerim-dong police officer assault incident, in which a female officer was criticized for her perceived lack of decisive action during the intervention. This incident reignited public debate over the roles and deployment of female officers.

==== Allegations of reverse discrimination and internal criticism ====
Within the police force, concerns about reverse discrimination have surfaced, with some officers arguing that gender quotas lead to unequal opportunities based on gender rather than merit.

The deployment of female officers has also raised operational concerns. Critics argue that in physically demanding roles such as riot control or serious crime investigations, female officers are less frequently assigned, raising doubts about the efficiency of increasing female officer numbers.

==== Positive contributions and role expansion ====
On the other hand, the increased presence of female officers has played a vital role in specific areas, particularly in sexual crime investigations, domestic violence response, and youth protection. In these cases, victims may feel more comfortable interacting with female officers, which can facilitate more effective investigations and support services.

==== The need for ongoing discussion ====
The debate over the expansion of female police officers continues, with growing calls for a focus not only on increasing numbers but also on enhancing effective role allocation and operational capability. There is also an emphasis on the need for long-term institutional reforms that promote both diversity and efficiency within the police organization.

=== Civilian massacres during the Korean War ===
Before the outbreak of the Korean War, the police cooperated with the Korean People's Guerrilla Army in the process of fighting with the Korean People's Guerrilla Army in Jeju Island, where （4·3 Incident） occurred, and in areas where （Yeosu·Suncheon Incident） occurred. Massacre civilians suspected of having done so. Right after the war broke out, in the process of retreating, prison inmates and （All-National Association—All-National Association members）were slaughtered, and after restoration, civilians suspected of collaborating with the Korean People's Army were slaughtered.

=== Oppression related to the democratization movement ===
The police played a role in suppressing the democratization movement during First Republic and Fifth Republic. At the time of (3·15 Masan Uprising), the police fired at the protesters, killing 7 people, Kim Joo-yeol's body was abandoned, and (4.19 Revolution) also fired at the protesters As a result, 185 people died. (Bucheon Police Station Sexual Torture Incident) and (Park Jong-cheol's Torture and Death Case).

=== Woo Bum-kon incident ===
The Woo Bum-kon incident (Korean: 우범곤 사건), also known as the Uiryeong shooting incident (의령 총기 사건) or Officer Woo incident (우 순경 사건), was a spree killing that occurred during the night from April 26 to April 27, 1982, in Uiryeong County, South Gyeongsang Province, South Korea. Policeman Woo Bum-kon murdered 56 people and wounded around 35 others in four villages using two stolen rifles and explosives. Woo killed himself in a suicide bombing with three hostages before a police response. It remains the deadliest mass shooting in South Korea’s history.

In the aftermath of the attack, several high-profile South Korean politicians resigned or were suspended, and a commission was formed to assess the handling of the massacre by the police. In 2024, a memorial to the victims of the attack was established in Uiryeong.

It remained the deadliest shooting spree carried out by a single perpetrator in modern history until it was surpassed by the 2011 Norway attacks, in which Anders Behring Breivik killed 77 people.

=== Ssangyong Motor dispute suppression ===
In May 2009, workers of the Ssangyong Motor company occupied a plant during an anti-layoff strike. After negotiations broke down in August, riot police deployed tear gas, tasers, helicopters, and planes to suppress the strikers. In response, the disgruntled workers used slingshots, Molotov cocktails, and crowbars. Although appellate courts initially ruled against the workers in 2016, the Supreme Court of Korea overturned the ruling. It was ruled that the workers acted in self-defense against excessive force from the police.

=== Controversy over the database of rally participants ===
According to the 2010 state audit data submitted by Democratic Party Choi Kyu-sik from the National Police Agency, the police have been systematically entering and managing photos of participants taken at rally and demonstration sites since 2001 after establishing a video interpretation system. The number of people entered for interpretation in this way was 23,698 over a period of five and a half years from 2005 to the end of August 2010. Since the police declared the half-price tuition rally in May 2011 illegal with tens of thousands of participants, it is likely that thousands more photos were entered. The National Police Agency did not disclose the scale of the data entered between 2001 and 2004.

=== Jeju scandal ===
In September 2026, a police officer in Jeju was arrested and accused of prematurely closing cases related to missing persons on the island.

== Ranks ==
Korean National Police ranks
Rank	치안총감	치안정감	치안감	경무관	총경	경정
Translation	Commissioner General	Chief Superintendent General	Senior Superintendent General	Superintendent General	Senior Superintendent	Superintendent
Insignia
Rank	경감	경위	경사	경장	순경
Translation	Senior Inspector	Inspector	Assistant Inspector	Senior police officer	Police officer
Insignia

Commissioner General is Chief of the Korean Police at most one may be appointed at a time. Chief Superintendent General are Deputy Chief of National Police Agency, Chief of local police agencies in Seoul, Busan, Gyeonggi and Incheon Province, Equivalent to dean of National Police College.

Newly commissioned officers are appointed as Policeman Assistant(순경시보) for a one-year probationary period. The uniform and insignia of an assistant is identical to those of a Policeman.

In Jeju Special Self-Governing Provincial Police Agency, prefix of all rank is 'Self-Governing' such as "Self-Governing Police Officer".

== Equipment ==
=== Uniform ===
Since the KNPA is a legitimate police force of a nation, it has its own distinct uniforms and headgear. Police uniforms in Korea are the same, as the nations long history of relying on a strong, centralized police force.

Officers of the KNPA, like most police forces, wear uniforms to deter crime by establishing a visible presence while on patrol, to make themselves easily identifiable to non-police officers or to their colleagues who require assistance, and to quickly identify each other at crime scenes for ease of coordination.

As for Police officers specialized for extra tasks, such as the Riot Police, SWAT teams etc, many other clothing were provided. For riot units, like the above the riot control uniform currently used by the KNPA.

=== Vehicles ===
Police cars used by the National Police Agency include the semi-mid-size Hyundai Elantra, mid-size Hyundai Sonata and SsangYong Korando C SUV. On average, there are two or three police cars in each police district, though there can be up to seven in busy areas. Motorcycles in the 1,170–1,690cc range are used for traffic operations.

South Korean police also use police buses. Currently used models are the Hyundai Universe and Hyundai Super Aero City, but all bus models will change to hydrogen vehicle like the Hyundai Elec City Hydrogen electric vehicle.

South Korean police uses various helicopters such as Bell 412, Bell 206L-3, AgustaWestland AW119 Koala, AgustaWestland AW109C, Bell 212, KAI KUH-1 Surion and Mil Mi-172.

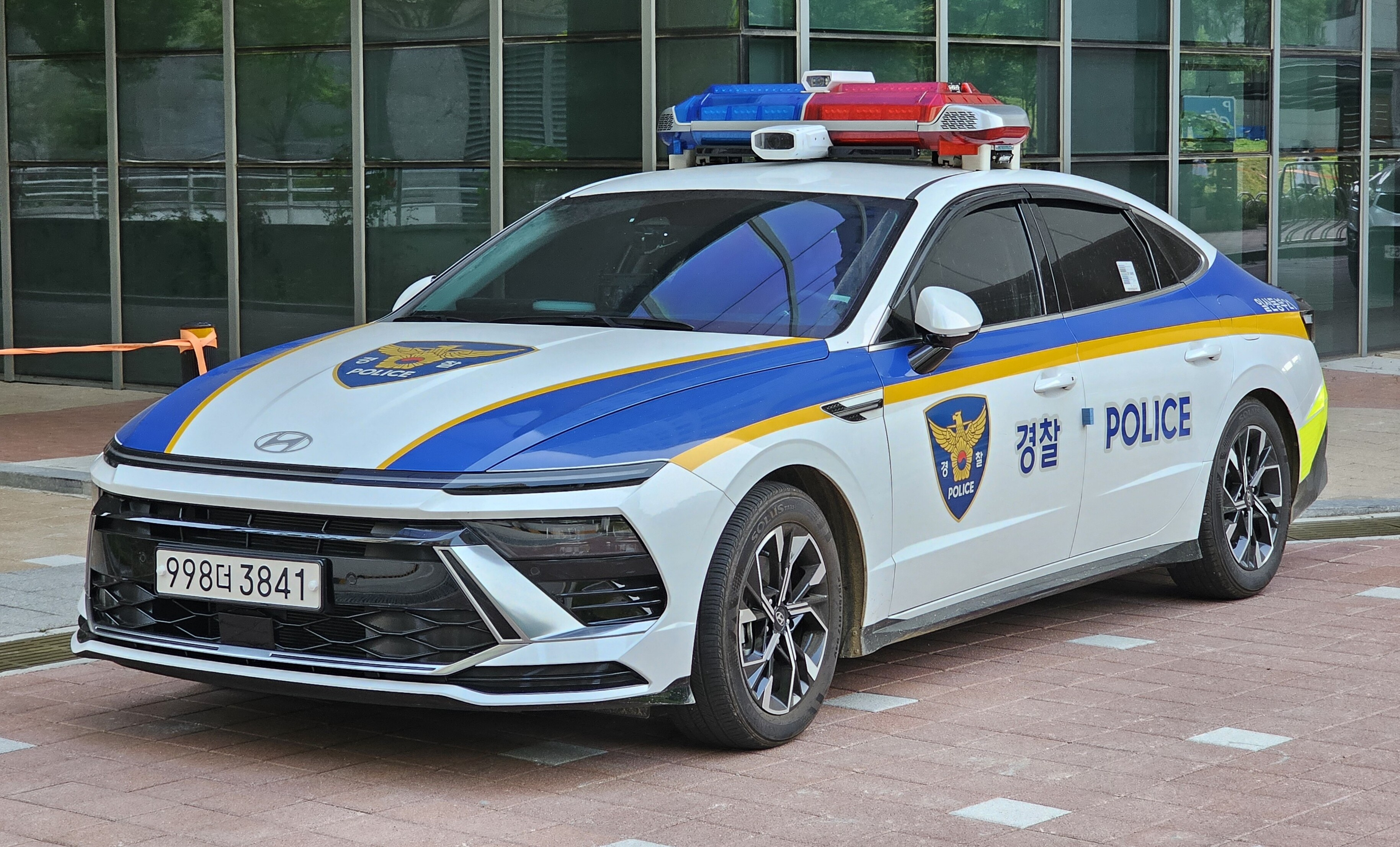
Hyundai Sonata police car

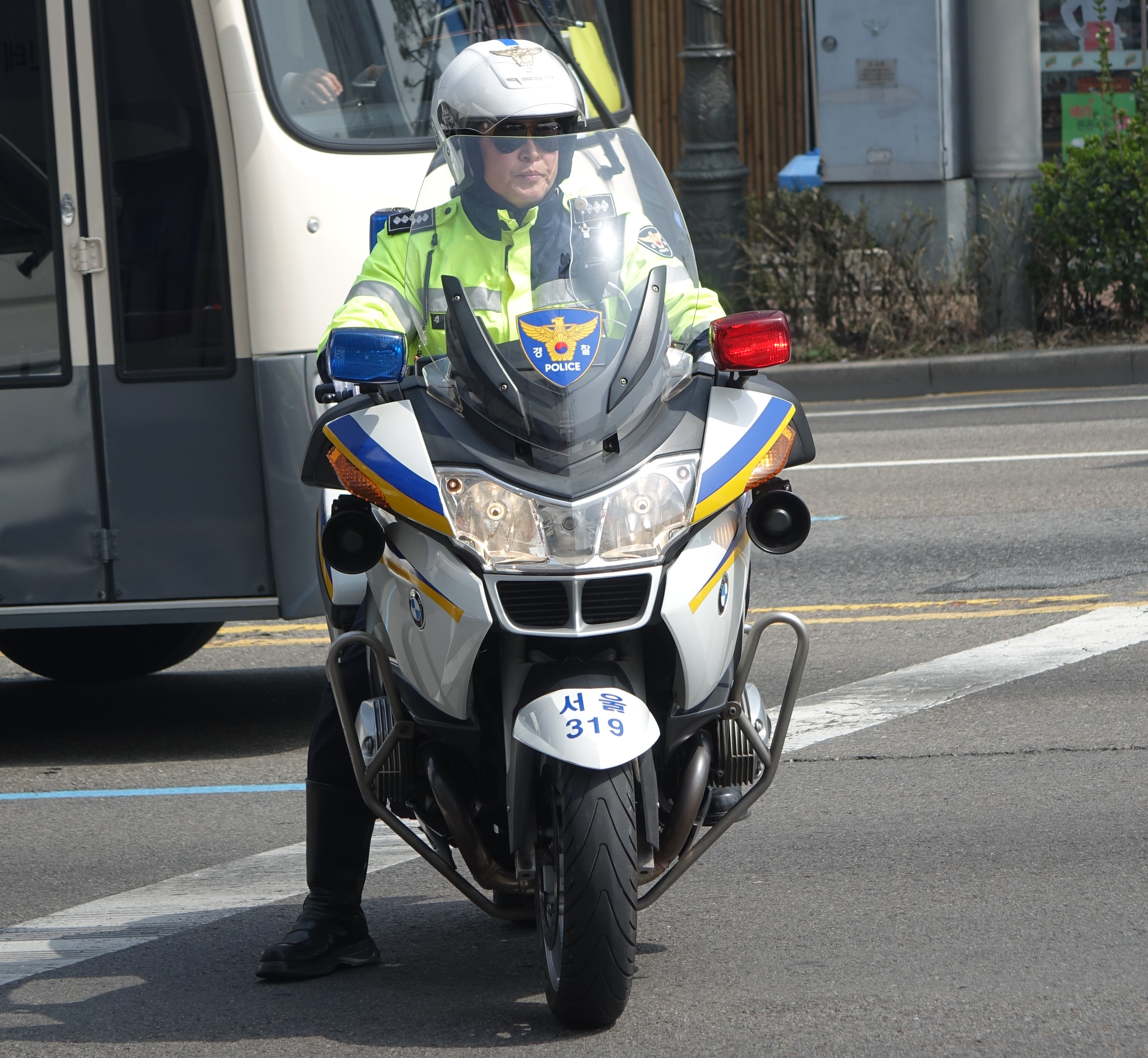
BMW R1200RT motorcycle

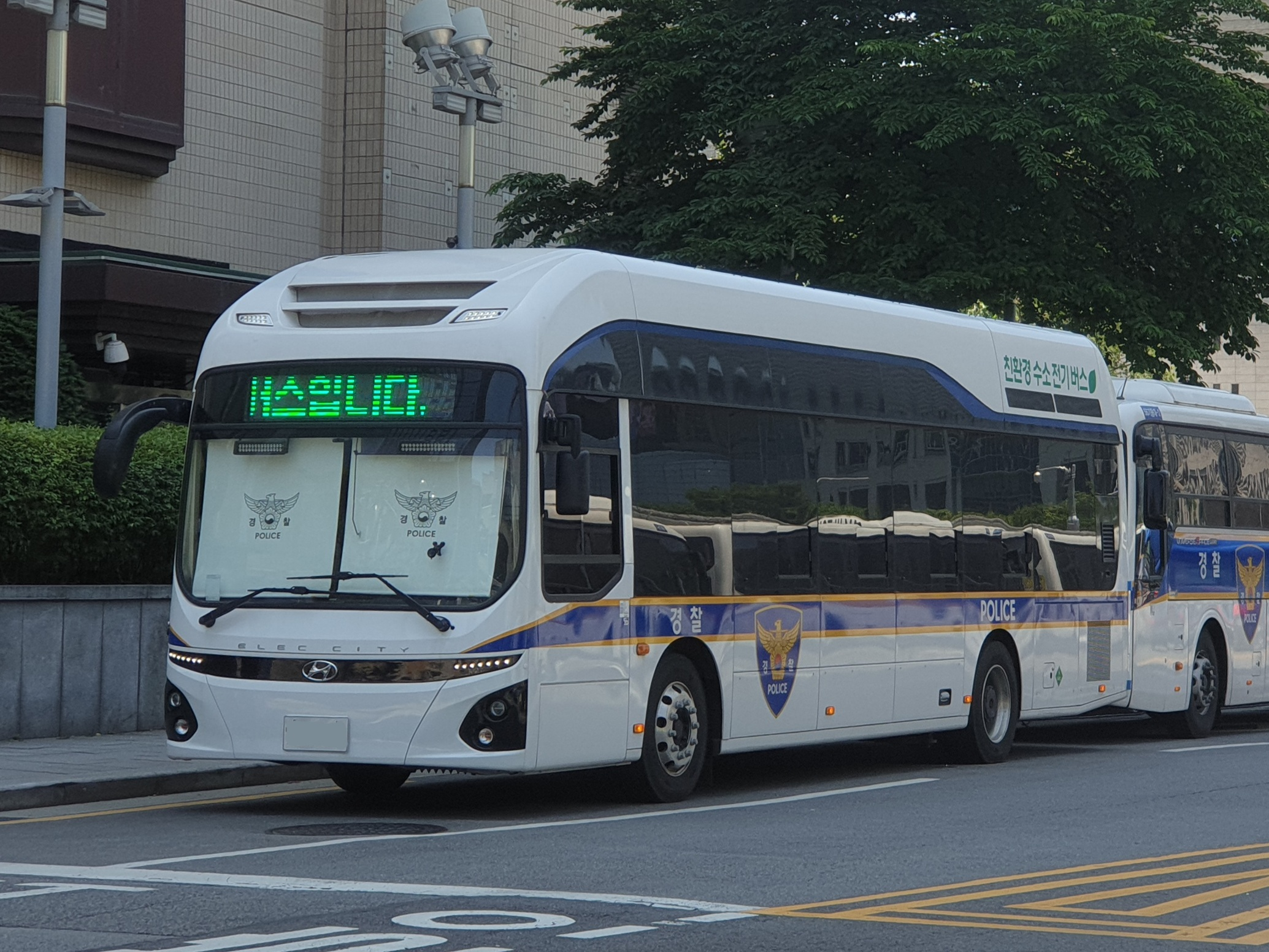
Hyundai Elec-City FCEV bus

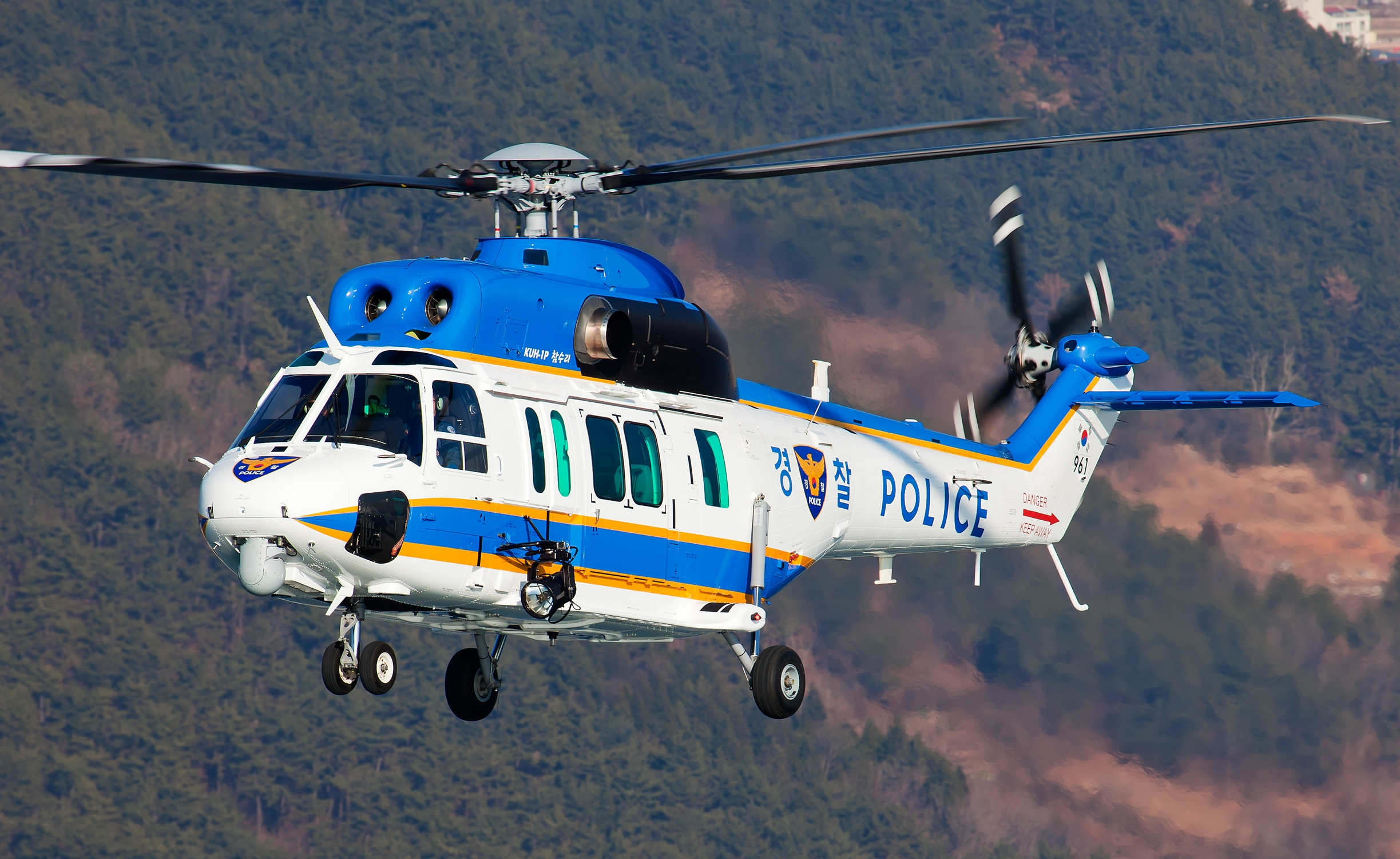
KUH-1P Chamsuri police helicopter

=== Equipment ===
Aside from firearms, police officers also utilize less-lethal weapons such as police batons and 5kV Tasers.

Name	Country of origin	Type	Notes
Smith & Wesson Model 10	United States	Revolver	Formerly issued sidearm for uniformed officers
Smith & Wesson Model 36	United States	Revolver	Formerly issued sidearm for plainclothed officers
Smith & Wesson Model 60	United States	Revolver	Standard issue sidearm for all officers certified to carry revolvers
Smith & Wesson M&P	United States	Semi-automatic pistol	Standard issue sidearm for 22PSG officers
Glock	Austria	Semi-automatic pistol	Standard issue sidearm for SOU officers
Heckler & Koch USP9T	Germany	Semi-automatic pistol	Standard issue sidearm for SOU officers
Heckler & Koch SFP9 OR	Germany	Semi-automatic pistol	Standard issue sidearm for SOU officers
Smith & Wesson Model 916	United States	Shotgun	Used by riot police in 70s~90s, currently in storage
Remington 870	United States	Shotgun	P and MCS variants in limited use by SOU for breaching purposes
Mossberg 590A1	United States	Shotgun	In limited use by SOU for breaching purposes
Benelli M4	Italy	Shotgun	Used by SOU
Heckler & Koch MP5	Germany	Submachine gun	A5 and SD6 variants in use by SOU
Heckler & Koch MP7	Germany	Submachine gun	Used by SOU
Heckler & Koch UMP45	Germany	Submachine gun	Used by SOU
Heckler & Koch HK416	Germany	Assault rifle	
Heckler & Koch G28	Germany	Battle rifle	
M4 carbine	United States	Assault rifle	Standard issue rifle for SOU; Mk.18 adopted by Daejeon Metropolitan Police SOU
Daewoo K1A	Republic of Korea	Assault rifle	
Daewoo K2	Republic of Korea	Assault rifle	
Accuracy International AW50	United Kingdom	Sniper rifle	Used by SOU
Barrett M107A1	United States	Sniper rifle	Used by SOU

== Reform and debate in police system ==
=== Autonomous Police System ===
The Autonomous Police System is one in which local governments are responsible for the installation, maintenance, and operation of police. In this system, The autonomous police mainly carry out life safety and crime prevention tasks, while the national police carry out the work on a national scale. This system is based on some legislation. Paragraph 1 of Article 117 of the South Korean constitution clarifies that the local governments are based on constitutional values, by stating local governments shall deal with administrative matters pertaining to the welfare of local residents, manage properties, and may enact provisions relating to local autonomy, within the limit of Acts and subordinate statutes.

In June 2006, Jeju Island started the autonomous police, but this police does not have authority to investigate. In 2018, It was discussed that introduction of the autonomous police would become nationwide. The autonomous police system has already been in effect on Jeju Island since 2006, and starting this year, it will be piloted in five cities and provinces, including Seoul and Sejong, and will gradually expand nationwide and go into full operation in 2020.

=== Investigation authority ===
Historically, the Korean criminal procedure system is concentrated to prosecutor authority. Warrant is only issued by request of prosecutor. Many criticisms of this system have been raised. One of the alternative systems is reform of the criminal investigation authority.

In 1990, the first debate of revision of investigation authority was started, but adjustment failed by gap of the Police and Prosecutors' Office. In 2011, revision of criminal procedure law recognized the authority of start and processing investigation to Police office, but executive order of investigation authority range of prosecutor reinforced power to prosecutor office. In 2019, collaboration relation adjustment of police office and prosecutor in investigation was sent to legislation commission.

== Cooperation with other countries ==
The Korean Police Agency cooperates with law enforcement organizations of other countries. In 2015, the Korean Police Agency create the "K-police Wave Center" (Korean: 치안한류센터) for exchange of police to other countries. Starting in 2016, Korean police began sending personnel and equipment to abroad police agencies. By 2019, this exchange had increased by eight-times compared to 2012. Countries include the United Arab Emirates, Chile, Vietnam and Guatemala. In 2019, the Seoul International National Commissioner General Conference was opened on the same day as the agency's 74-year anniversary. Participants of the conference included diplomats from 29 countries, including the United States, China and Russia.

Country	Examples of Cooperation
The United Arab Emirates	• Police and security cooperation agreement signed in 2016. • Police exchanges and professional cooperation. • Korean police representation in Dubai. • Participation in international policing and security forums. • In July 2026, the National Police Agency cooperated with authorities in the United Arab Emirates to arrest and repatriate two suspects accused of operating large-scale illegal online gambling networks. • In October 2026, the National Police Agency, as part of South Korea's interagency task force on transnational crime, cooperated with authorities in the United Arab Emirates (UAE) to arrest alleged leaders of an illegal online gambling network.
Chile	• Police exchanges and institutional cooperation. • Exchange of policing expertise and experience. • Included among the KNPA's international police-cooperation partners.
Vietnam	• Police cooperation agreement since 2005. • Cooperation against drugs and transnational crime. • Joint investigations and information sharing. • Cooperation against online fraud and other cybercrime.
Guatamala	• Police cooperation agreement since 2012. • Police training and capacity building. • Cooperation involving criminal investigation and policing expertise. • Korean police liaison presence in Guatemala.
The United States	• Police cooperation agreement with the U.S. Department of Homeland Security since 2013. • Cooperation with the FBI on cybercrime and security. • Korean police liaison officers at several U.S. locations.
China	• Police cooperation agreement since 1996, revised in 2024 • Cooperation against transnational crime • Joint efforts against drug trafficking and voice-phishing crime • Extensive police liaison network in China
Russia	• Police cooperation agreement with the Russian Ministry of Internal Affairs since 2000 • Information and experience exchanges • Korean police liaison officer in Russia

United Arab Emirates

The Korean National Police Agency and the United Arab Emirates Ministry of Interior signed a memorandum of understanding on security cooperation in 2016, covering areas including terrorism, transnational crime, drug trafficking and police training. Cooperation has continued through police exchanges and liaison activities. In 2024, Korean and Emirati law-enforcement representatives participated in international policing events, including the INTERPOL Future of Policing Congress in Incheon and the World Police Summit in Dubai, providing further opportunities for exchanges on policing practices and transnational crime. In July and October 2026, the National Police Agency cooperated with United Arab Emirates (UAE) authorities in joint operations against illegal online gambling networks, resulting in the arrest of five suspects across the two operations, with four repatriated to South Korea and one awaiting repatriation. The networks were suspected of handling a combined 8.4 trillion won (approximately US$5.5 billion) in gambling operations.

Chile

Chile is among the countries with which the Korean National Police Agency has developed international police exchanges and cooperation. The relationship has primarily involved the exchange of policing experience and institutional contacts rather than the kind of operational joint investigations documented between South Korea and some Asian partners. Chile's inclusion among the KNPA's international cooperation partners reflects the agency's wider effort to develop police-to-police relationships throughout Latin America.

Vietnam

South Korea and Vietnam have maintained formal police cooperation since the two countries' police agencies signed a memorandum of understanding in May 2005. Cooperation has subsequently expanded to include transnational crime, narcotics offences, information sharing and exchanges between police personnel. In June 2023, the Korean National Police Agency and Vietnam's Ministry of Public Security agreed to strengthen comprehensive and strategic cooperation against transnational crimes, including drug-related offences. The two countries have also conducted police-exchange programs intended to improve cooperation and understanding between their respective law-enforcement agencies. The relationship has increasingly included cooperation against cyber-enabled crime. Korean and Vietnamese authorities have worked together on cases involving online fraud and other offences affecting victims in both countries, while South Korea has continued to support exchanges of investigative expertise and policing technology. In 2026, the two countries again agreed to strengthen cooperation against transnational crime, demonstrating the continuing development of the bilateral police relationship.

Guatemala

Guatemala and South Korea established a formal police cooperation framework in July 2012. Cooperation has included police training and the exchange of expertise, forming part of South Korea's wider program of international police capacity building. The KNPA also maintains a police liaison post in Guatemala, allowing Korean and Guatemalan authorities to facilitate communication and law-enforcement cooperation. South Korean police cooperation with Guatemala forms part of a broader effort to transfer Korean policing experience overseas, particularly in areas such as criminal investigation and policing technology. Such programs have complemented South Korea's wider development cooperation activities in Central America.

United States

The Korean National Police Agency has maintained institutional cooperation with U.S. law-enforcement authorities in areas including cybercrime, security and transnational crime. A memorandum of understanding with the U.S. Department of Homeland Security was concluded in August 2013. The KNPA also maintains several police liaison posts in the United States, including in Washington, Los Angeles, New York, Chicago and Atlanta. Cooperation has also involved direct contact with the Federal Bureau of Investigation (FBI). In April 2023, the Korean National Police Commissioner General visited FBI headquarters and met with the FBI Director to discuss expanding cooperation in cybersecurity and national-security-related policing. Such cooperation has become increasingly important as criminal networks have expanded their activities across national borders and through digital networks.

China

China has been one of the Korean National Police Agency's longest-standing major partners. The two countries' police authorities concluded their first memorandum of understanding in November 1996, and the agreement was revised in May 2024.[1] The KNPA maintains an extensive police liaison network in China, with officers stationed in Beijing, Shanghai, Shenyang, Qingdao, Chengdu, Guangzhou, Xi'an, Wuhan and Hong Kong. In May 2024, the Korean National Police Agency and China's Ministry of Public Security agreed to strengthen strategic police cooperation against transnational crime. The two sides specifically identified crimes such as drug trafficking and voice phishing as areas for closer cooperation and agreed to strengthen information exchanges and operational cooperation. The 2024 revision of their police-cooperation agreement provided an updated institutional framework for this cooperation.

Russia

South Korea and Russia established a formal police-cooperation framework in September 2000 through an agreement between the Korean National Police Agency and Russia's Ministry of Internal Affairs. The agreement provides a basis for exchanges and cooperation between the two countries' law-enforcement authorities. The KNPA also maintains a police liaison officer in Russia as part of its overseas network. The relationship has primarily centered on institutional cooperation, information exchange and assistance between the two countries' law-enforcement authorities. Russia remains listed by the KNPA among its formal international police-cooperation partners.

In addition, the Korean National Police has exchange agreements with European and North American law enforcement agencies. In 2013, the KNPA and Homeland Security Investigations (HSI) signed a Memorandum of Understanding to strengthen cooperation on combatting transnational organized crime. Officials signed a six-page agreement aimed at supporting the exchange of law enforcement information and the sharing of relevant techniques and cooperative investigative efforts. In 2014, the KNPA and Homeland Security Investigations (HSI) signed a Letter of Intent (LOI) aimed at combatting the online exploitation of children. In 2015, the KNP concluded a Cyber Crime Investigation Division (CID) cooperation Memorandum of Understanding (MOU) with the U.S. Federal Bureau of Investigation (FBI). In 2019, KNP dispatched officers to Croatia for tourism safety programs. In the "Croatia-South Korea Tourism safety cooperation MOU", six South Korean police officers patrolled Zagreb and Dubrovnik with Croatian police.

=== Entry into the Virtual Global Taskforce ===
The South Korean Cyber Crime Investigation Division (CID) of the Korean National Police (KNP) joined the Virtual Global Taskforce VGTF. The VGTG is led by Homeland Security Investigations (HSI) Cyber Crimes Center in the global effort to combat the online exploitation of children.

== Public safety ==
South Korea has a lower crime rate than comparable industrialized countries. South Korea is considered one of the world's safest tourist destinations, with low crime rates and essentially no history of terrorist activity other than by the North. By this system, South Korean successfully and safely opened international events like the 2018 Winter Olympics.

== See also ==
- Law enforcement in South Korea
- Republic of Korea Auxiliary Police
