= Song Chi-hun =

South Korean footballer

Song Chi-Hun
Personal information
- Full name: Song Chi-Hun
- Date of birth: 24 September 1991 (age 35)
- Place of birth: South Korea
- Height: 1.77 m (5 ft 9 1/2 in)
- Position: Forward

Youth career
- 2010–2012: Kwangwoon University

Senior career*
Years	Team	Apps	(Gls)
2013–2014	Bucheon FC 1995	20	(6)
2018	National Defense Ministry	5	(1)
2018–2019	Nagaworld	10	(7)
- * Club domestic league appearances and goals as of 19 December 2013

Song Chi-Hun (Korean: 송치훈; born 24 September 1991) is a South Korean footballer who plays as midfielder.

== Career ==
He was selected by Bucheon FC 1995 in the 2013 K League draft.
