= Kim Heung-il =

South Korean footballer (born 1992)

Kim Heung-Il
Personal information
- Full name: Kim Heung-Il
- Date of birth: 2 November 1992 (age 33)
- Place of birth: South Korea
- Height: 1.79 m (5 ft 10 1/2 in)
- Position: Forward

Team information
- Current team: Daegu FC
- Number: 27

Youth career
- 2011–2012: Dong-a University

Senior career*
Years	Team	Apps	(Gls)
2013–	Daegu FC	23	(0)
- * Club domestic league appearances and goals as of 27 November 2014

Kim Heung-Il (Korean: 김흥일; born 2 November 1992) is a South Korean footballer who plays as forward for Daegu FC in K League Challenge.

== Career ==
He joined Daegu FC in December 2012 and became a Daegu FC's first ever player who graduated from a youth team of the club.
