= Choi Nak-min =

South Korean footballer (born 1989)

Choi Nak-Min
Personal information
- Full name: Choi Nak-Min
- Date of birth: 27 May 1989 (age 37)
- Place of birth: South Korea
- Height: 1.85 m (6 ft 1 in)
- Position: Forward

Team information
- Current team: Bucheon FC 1995
- Number: 26

Youth career
- Kyonggi University

Senior career*
Years	Team	Apps	(Gls)
2012	Suwon Bluewings	0	(0)
2013–	Bucheon FC 1995	28	(4)
- * Club domestic league appearances and goals as of 28 November 2014

Choi Nak-Min (Korean: 최낙민; born 27 May 1989) is a South Korean footballer who plays as forward for Bucheon FC 1995 in K League Challenge.

== Career ==
He was selected by Suwon Samsung Bluewings in the 2012 K-League draft. He moved to Bucheon FC after the season ends.
