= Park Jae-hong (footballer, born 1990) =

South Korean footballer

Park Jae-Hong
Personal information
- Full name: Park Jae-Hong
- Date of birth: 6 April 1990 (age 36)
- Place of birth: South Korea
- Height: 1.89 m (6 ft 2 1/2 in)
- Position: Centre back

Team information
- Current team: Bucheon FC 1995
- Number: 3

Youth career
- 2009–2012: Yonsei University

Senior career*
| Years | Team | Apps | (Gls) |
| 2013– | Bucheon FC | 52 | (1) |
- * Club domestic league appearances and goals as of 15 December 2015

Park Jae-Hong (Korean: 박재홍; born 6 April 1990) is a South Korean footballer who plays as centre back for Bucheon FC 1995 in K League Challenge.

== Career ==
Park was selected by Bucheon FC in the 2013 K League draft. He made 32 appearances and a goal in his debut season.
