= Republic of Korea Auxiliary Police =

Police agency in South Korea

- Republic of Korea Police Patch
- Common name: Republic of Korea Auxiliary Police (Korean: 대한민국 의무경찰)
- Abbreviation: ROKAP (Korean: 의무경찰
- Motto: 자랑스런 의무경찰, 당신은 대한민국의 미래입니다 (transl. "Proud Republic of Korea Auxiliary Police, You are the future of the Republic of Korea")

Agency overview
- Formed: September 1, 1967; 59 years ago
- Dissolved: June 4th, 2023
- Employees: 14,806

Jurisdictional structure
- Operations jurisdiction: Republic of Korea, ROK
- Population: 51,250,000
- General nature: Civilian police

Operational structure
- Agency executive: Min Gab-ryong (Korean:민갑룡), Chief of Agency

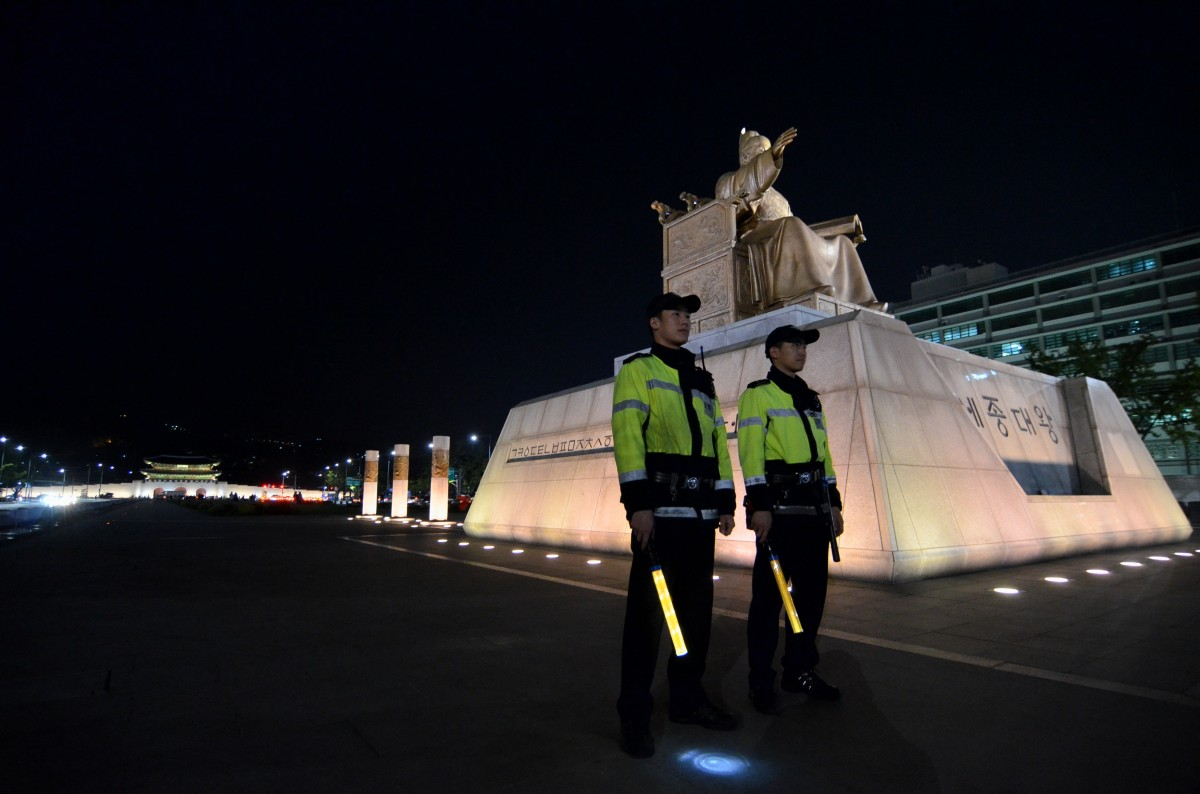
Republic of Korea Auxiliary Police on guard

Republic of Korea Auxiliary Police (Hangul: 대한민국 의무경찰) is an organization belonging to the National Police Agency in South Korea. It is a kind of switched service that attracts and uses active resources to fulfill the military service in Korea. The Auxiliary Police supply personnel on a voluntary basis.

The National Police Agency's auxiliary police force will be trained at the education level of each local government office after completing basic military at the Army Training Center, and will be assigned to the task force, security patrol team, and others. The service period is 21 months like that of the Army. Large numbers of people are also deployed to prevent crime in areas where crimes are chronic. It is used to apply for large scale career requirements among police duties.

== The establishment ==
Republic of Korea Auxiliary police was founded on December 31, 1982, with the aim of assisting security after the curfew was lifted. In 1967, the combat police were organized, Auxiliary Police separated in 1982.

== Recruitment and deployment process ==
Auxiliary Police submits application forms and required documents to the police department belonging to the local police office, and takes the selection process at the designated time and place.

It will receive a four-week basic military training at the Army Training Center and three-week training session for the local police agency. It will be deployed to the local police station depending on the results of the Army Training Center and training session for the local police agency, which considers the location and location of the site.

The basic military training for police officers is the same four-week training camp as the Recruit Service, and the deployment criteria are the educational performance at the Army Training Center and the Regional Security Agency.

== Rank structure ==
Rank	Insignia	Uniform
Sugyeong (Hangul:수경) (Sergeant Constable in Army)		Blue shirts and dark blue pants
Sanggyeong (Hangul:상경) (Corporal Constable in Army)		Blue shirts and dark blue pants
Ilgyeong (Hangul:일경) (Private Constable First Class in Army)		Blue shirts and dark blue pants
Igyeong (Hangul:이경) (Private Constable in Army)		Blue shirts and dark blue pants

== Organization Structure ==
Seoul Metropolitan Police Agency

- Headquarter Task force
  - 1 Task Force
    - 11 Company
    - 12 Company
    - 13 Company
    - 14 Company
    - 15 Company
    - 16 Company
    - 17 Company
    - 18 Company
    - 19 Company
  - 2 Task Force
    - 21 Company
    - 22 Company
    - 23 Company
    - 24 Company
    - 25 Company
  - 3 Task Force
    - 31 Company
    - 32 Company
    - 33 Company
    - 34 Company
    - 35 Company
    - 36 Company
    - 37 Company
    - 38 Company
  - 4 Task Force
    - 41 Company
    - 42 Company
    - 43 Company
    - 45 Company
    - 46 Company
    - 47 Company
  - 5 Task Force
    - 51 Company
    - 52 Company
    - 53 Company
    - 55 Company
    - 56 Company
    - 57 Company
    - 59 Company
- Auxiliary Police Corporation
  - 105 Auxiliary Police Corporation
  - 603 Auxiliary Police Corporation
  - 606 Auxiliary Police Corporation
  - 607 Auxiliary Police Corporation
  - 713 Auxiliary Police Corporation
  - 715 Auxiliary Police Corporation
  - 718 Auxiliary Police Corporation
  - 802 Auxiliary Police Corporation
  - 806 Auxiliary Police Corporation
  - 809 Auxiliary Police Corporation
- Police station
  - Gang-nam Security Patrol
  - Gang-dong Security Patrol
  - Gang-buk Security Patrol
  - Gang-seo Security Patrol
  - Gwan-ak Security Patrol
  - Gwang-jin Security Patrol
  - Guro Security Patrol
  - Geum-cheon Security Patrol
  - Namdaemun Security Patrol
  - No-won Security Patrol
  - Do-bong Security Patrol
  - Dongdaemun Security Patrol
  - Dong-jak Security Patrol
  - Mapo Security Patrol
  - Bang-bae Security Patrol
  - Seodaemun Security Patrol
  - Seo-bu Security Patrol
  - Seo-cho Security Patrol
  - Seong-dong Security Patrol
  - Seong-buk Security Patrol
  - Song-pa Security Patrol
  - Su-seo Security Patrol
  - Yang-cheon Security Patrol
  - Yeongdeungpo Security Patrol
  - Yong-san Security Patrol
  - Eun-pyeong Security Patrol
  - Jong-ro Security Patrol
  - Jong-am Security Patrol
  - Joong-rang Security Patrol
  - Joong-bu Security Patrol
  - Hye-hwa Security Patrol

Busan Metropolitan Police Agency

- Mobile Police Force
  - Headquarter Mobile Police Force
  - 1 Company
  - 2 Company
- Police station
  - Buk-bu Security Patrol
  - Dong-nae Security Patrol
  - Sa-ha Security Patrol
  - Dong-bu Security Patrol
  - Busanjin Security Patrol
  - Geum-Jung Security Patrol
  - Nambu Security Patrol
  - Haeundae Security Patrol
  - Sa-sang Security Patrol

Daegu Metropolitan Police Agency

- Mobile Police Force
  - 1 Company
- Police station
  - Joongbu Security Patrol
  - Dal-seo Security Patrol
  - Seobu Security Patrol
  - Nambu Security Patrol
  - Bukbu Security Patrol
  - Su-seong Security Patrol

Incheon Metropolitan Police Agency

- Mobile Police Force
  - 3 Company
  - 6 Company
  - Airport Mobile Police Force
- Police station
  - Joongbu Security Patrol
  - Nambu Security Patrol
  - Nam-dong Security Patrol
  - Gye-yang Security Patrol
  - Seobu Security Patrol

Gwangju Metropolitan Police Agency

- Mobile Police Force
  - 8 Company
- Police station
  - Dongbu Security Patrol
  - Seobu Security Patrol
  - Nambu Security Patrol
  - Bukbu Security Patrol

Daejeon Metropolitan Police Agency

- Mobile Police Force
  - National Security Agency in Daejeon
- Police station
  - Seobu Security Patrol
  - Dae-duk Security Patrol
  - Dun-san Security Patrol

Ulsan Metropolitan Police Agency

- Mobile Police Force
  - 1 Company
  - 2 Company
  - 3 Company

Gyeonggi Nambu Provincial Police Agency

- Mobile Police Force
  - 1 Company
  - 2 Company
  - 3 Company
  - 4 Company
  - 5 Company
- Auxiliary Police Corporation
  - 120 Auxiliary Police Corporation
  - 126 Auxiliary Police Corporation
  - 705 Auxiliary Police Corporation
  - 807 Auxiliary Police Corporation
- Police station
  - Suwon Joongbu Security Patrol
  - Yong-in Dongbu Security Patrol
  - Anyang Dong-ahn Security Patrol
  - Gwacheon Security Patrol
  - Seong-nam Soo-jeong Security Patrol
  - Hwa-seong Dongbu Security Patrol
  - Pyeong-taek Security Patrol
  - Gwang-myeong Security Patrol

Gyeonggi Bukbu Provincial Police Agency

- Mobile Police Force
  - 1 Company
  - 2 Company
  - 3 Company
  - 5 Company
- Police station
  - Uijeongbu Security Patrol
  - Il-san Dongbu Security Patrol

Gangwon Provincial Police Agency

- Mobile Police Force
  - 1 Company
  - 2 Company
- Police station
  - Gangneung Security Patrol

Chungbuk Provincial Police Agency

- Mobile Police Force
  - 1 Company
- Auxiliary Police Corporation
- Police station
  - Cheong-ju Sangdang Security Patrol
  - Cheong-ju Heung-duk Security Patrol

Chungnam Provincial Police Agency

- Mobile Police Force
  - 1 Company
  - 2 Company
- Auxiliary Police Corporation
  - 505 Auxiliary Police Corporation
  - 708 Auxiliary Police Corporation
- Police station

Jeonbuk Provincial Police Agency

- Mobile Police Force
  - 1 Company
  - 2 Company
- Auxiliary Police Corporation
  - 308 Auxiliary Police Corporation
- Police station
  - Jeon-ju Wan-san Security Patrol
  - Jeon-ju Deok-jin Security Patrol

Jeonnam Provincial Police Agency

- Mobile Police Force
  - 11 Company
- Auxiliary Police Corporation
  - 501 Auxiliary Police Corporation
  - 507 Auxiliary Police Corporation
  - 716 Auxiliary Police Corporation
- Police station
  - Mok-po Security Patrol

Gyeongbuk Provincial Police Agency

- Mobile Police Force
  - 1 Company
  - 2 Company
- Auxiliary Police Corporation
  - 315 Auxiliary Police Corporation
  - Dokdo Security Police
- Police station
  - Gyeong-ju Security Patrol
  - Po-nam Security Patrol
  - Gumi Security Patrol

Gyeongnam Provincial Police Agency

- Mobile Police Force
  - 1 Company
  - 2 Company
  - 3 Company
  - 5 Company
  - 6 Company
- Auxiliary Police Corporation
  - 502 Auxiliary Police Corporation
  - 509 Auxiliary Police Corporation
- Police station
  - Chang-won Jungbu Security Patrol
  - Masan Jungbu Security Patrol

Jeju Provincial Police Agency

- Defense Corporation
  - Jeju Coastal Line Defense Corps
  - 901 Auxiliary police battalion
  - 902 Auxiliary police battalion
  - 121 Auxiliary Police Corporation
  - 123 Auxiliary Police Corporation
  - 127 Auxiliary Police Corporation
  - 128 Auxiliary Police Corporation
  - Airport Mobile Police Force
- Police station
  - Jeju Dongbu Security Patrol

The organizational system can be divided into those directly under police agencies and those belonging to the Task Force.

Members of the mobile units will be classified as local police and police officers. The internal structure of the task force consists of the headquarters platoon, the 1st Platoon, the 2nd Platoon and the 3rd Platoon.

The leader of the start-up team is the Director General, the assistant director is the Director General, the Director of the start-up team is the Director General, the Manerintendent is the Head, and the Director of the company is the Director. In normal cases, an Inspector will take over the platoon leader for riot police belonging to the local police department or for security patrols. However, some are in charge of acting as a platoon leader, with the Assistant Inspector-class wearing green shoes. In addition, the assistant platoon leader is usually the Assistant Inspector level, but Senior Policeman is in some cases.

== Identity ==
Identity is a police officer and not a soldier during service as Auxiliary Police. Also, they belong to the police officers, which are prescribed under Article 2 (1) of the National Compensation Act.

== Peacetime and wartime operation ==
Based on the permanent establishment company, the agency will be operated in peacetime under the direction of management of the experience, which is provided by the police service department of each district. Career management is divided into preparation for the situation, congestion security, facility security, security patrols, and transportation assistance.

Congestion guards play a role of maintaining order and protecting key personnel at various event sites, and facility security refers to guarding important facilities.

A security patrol is generally defined as a patrol unit patrolling the jurisdiction of the police station to which the unit belongs.

Auxiliary Police will also fight with the military's reserve in case of emergency. It has a K2 rifle, an individual weapon, and basic personal equipment such as magazines and helmets. Unlike the South Korean military, however, they do not fire rifles in peacetime, and only one or two times a year they conduct regular shooting exercises at nearby military firing ranges.

== The Auxiliary police in culture ==
Auxiliary police also appear in dramas and movies when demonstration scene.

In the comics, Naver Webtoon author Jo Seok frequently describes his experiences in Auxiliary police service by writing a comic book titled "The Sound of Heart" (Hangul: 마음의 소리). It was published in June 2007.

On Naver Webtoons, Seongjeon and Yoon Sung-won are running a cartoon entitled "Beautiful Gunbari" every Monday. The writer describes the situation in the mid-2000s when he was serving in the military in a very realistic manner. On the other hand, the difference between the existing comics is that the main characters and the order of the group are both women as in the comic universe South Korea has enacted a universal conscription policy which both men and women are required to perform compulsory military service.

== The Dissolution of The Auxiliary Police ==
Moon Jae-in, the president, announced plans to completely lift the Republic of Korea Auxiliary Police after 2023.

As a result, National Police Agency has been cutting staff by 20 percent every year since 2017.

After the last conscripted conscripts in December 2021, they will be completely abolished after September 2023. Finally, in 2023, march, the historic agency was officially disbanded after its long 55 years of service, and the remaining officers who were in the Republic Of Korea Coast Guard were discharged from service in June Fourth the same year, making it unofficially disbanded in that same day.

== Relevant laws ==
- Police law
- Act on the establishment and operation of the Auxiliary police force
- The Military Service Law
