= 2011 Daejeon Citizen FC season =

Daejeon Citizen
2011 season
- Chairman: Yeom Hong-Chul (Daejeon mayor)
- Manager: Wang Sun-Jae (until July 2, 2011); Yoo Sang-Chul (since July 17, 2011)
- K-League: 15th
- Korean FA Cup: Round of 16
- League Cup: Group round
- Top goalscorer: League: Park Sung-Ho (8); All: Park Sung-Ho (10)
- Highest home attendance: 32,340 vs Seoul (March 12)
- Lowest home attendance: 1,775 vs Daegu (May 11)
- Average home league attendance: 12,954
| Home colours | Away colours |

The 2011 season was Daejeon Citizen's fifteenth season in the K-League in South Korea. Daejeon Citizen competed in K-League, League Cup and Korean FA Cup.

== Current squad ==
Note: Flags indicate national team as defined under FIFA eligibility rules; some limited exceptions apply. Players may hold more than one non-FIFA nationality.

| No. | Pos. | Nation | Player |
|---|---|---|---|
| 2 | DF | KOR | Park Jung-Hye |
| 4 | DF | KOR | Park Kun-Young |
| 5 | DF | KOR | Kim Young-Bin |
| 6 | DF | KOR | Cho Hong-Kyu |
| 7 | MF | KOR | Kim Seong-Jun |
| 8 | MF | KOR | Lee Hyun-Woong |
| 9 | FW | BRA | Wagner |
| 11 | FW | KOR | Park Sung-Ho (captain) |
| 13 | DF | KOR | Kim Chang-Hoon |
| 14 | MF | JPN | Yuta Baba |
| 15 | FW | KOR | Kim Jin-Sol |
| 16 | FW | KOR | Hwang Hun-Hee |
| 17 | MF | KOR | Han Jae-Woong |
| 18 | MF | KOR | Kang In-Jun |
| 19 | DF | KOR | Jun Sang-Hoon |
| 20 | DF | KOR | Lee Ho |
| 21 | GK | KOR | Choi Eun-Sung |
| 22 | MF | KOR | Park Min-Keun |
| 23 | FW | KOR | Jeon Bo-Hoon |
| 24 | MF | KOR | Kim Tae-Yeon |
| 25 | MF | KOR | Lee Sang-Hyup (on loan from Jeju United) |
| 26 | FW | KOR | Kim Ju-Hyoung |

| No. | Pos. | Nation | Player |
|---|---|---|---|
| 27 | MF | KOR | Lee Hyun-Ho |
| 28 | DF | KOR | Kim Jin-Man |
| 29 | MF | KOR | Kim Do-yeon |
| 30 | DF | KOR | Choi Hyun-Bin (on loan from FC Seoul) |
| 31 | GK | KOR | Jung Gyu-Jin |
| 33 | DF | KOR | Lee Woong-Hee |
| 35 | DF | KOR | Lee Sang-Hee |
| 36 | FW | KOR | Jung Yeon-Woong |
| 37 | MF | KOR | Noh Yong-Hun |
| 38 | MF | KOR | Go Dae-Woo |
| 39 | MF | KOR | Choi Wang-Gil |
| 40 | MF | KOR | Cho Eui-Kwon |
| 41 | GK | KOR | Choi Hyun |
| 42 | MF | KOR | Han Doc-Hee |
| 44 | MF | KOR | Hwang Jin-San |
| 45 | DF | KOR | Park Seon-Woo |
| 46 | MF | KOR | Kim Kyung-Kuk |
| 70 | FW | KOR | Kim Ji-min |
| 71 | DF | KOR | Yoon Sin-Young |
| 72 | FW | KOR | Kwak Chul-Ho |
| 73 | FW | KOR | Lee Je-Kyu |
| 74 | DF | KOR | Yoo Min-Chul |

== Match results ==
=== K-League ===
| Date Round | Home | Score | Away | Location |

| 6 March 1 | Ulsan Hyundai | 1–2 | Daejeon Citizen | Nam-gu, Ulsan |
| 15:00 UTC+9 | Kim Shin-Wook 80' | Report | Wagner 19', 51' | Stadium: Munsu Cup Stadium; Attendance: 34,758; Referee: Lee Sang-Yong |

| 12 March 2 | Daejeon Citizen | 1–1 | Seoul | Yuseong-gu, Daejeon |
| 15:00 UTC+9 | Wagner 13' | Report | Hwang Jae-Hun 37' (o.g.) | Stadium: Daejeon World Cup Stadium; Attendance: 32,340; Referee: Lee Sam-Ho |

| 20 March 3 | Daejeon Citizen | 2–0 | Gyeongnam | Yuseong-gu, Daejeon |
| 15:00 UTC+9 | Wagner 48'; Hwang Jae-Hun 74' | Report | | Stadium: Daejeon World Cup Stadium; Attendance: 8,209; Referee: Ko Hyung-Jin |

| 3 April 4 | Gangwon | 0–3 | Daejeon Citizen | Gangneung, Gangwon |
| 15:00 UTC+9 | | Report | Kim Seong-Jun 78'; Park Sung-Ho 84', 90+5' | Stadium: Gangneung Stadium; Attendance: 12,317; Referee: Moon Jin-Hee |

| 10 April 5 | Daejeon Citizen | 0–0 | Jeju United | Yuseong-gu, Daejeon |
| 15:00 UTC+9 | Han Jae-Woong (yellow card) 52' (yellow-red card) 64' | Report | | Stadium: Daejeon World Cup Stadium; Attendance: 16,788; Referee: An Yong-Hee |

| 16 April 6 | Sangju Sangmu Phoenix | 0–0 | Daejeon Citizen | Sangju, Gyeongbuk |
| 15:00 UTC+9 | | Report | | Stadium: Sangju Stadium; Attendance: 7,624; Referee: Choi Kwang-Bo |

| 24 April 7 | Daejeon Citizen | 1–3 | Busan I'Park | Yuseong-gu, Daejeon |
| 15:00 UTC+9 | Han Jae-Woong 25' | Report | Kim Eung-Jin 13'; Kim Han-Yoon 52'; Han Sang-Woon 70' | Stadium: Daejeon World Cup Stadium; Attendance: 14,895; Referee: Lim Won-Taek |

| 1 May 8 | Gwangju | 2–1 | Daejeon Citizen | Seo-gu, Gwangju |
| 15:00 UTC+9 | Lee Seung-Ki 6'; João Paulo 34' | Report | Kim Chang-Hoon 42' | Stadium: Gwangju World Cup Stadium; Attendance: 2,515; Referee: Kim Jong-hyeok |

| 8 May 9 | Daejeon Citizen | 1–2 | Incheon United | Yuseong-gu, Daejeon |
| 15:00 UTC+9 | Wagner 64' | Report | Park Jun-Tae 74'; Kim Jae-Woong 82' | Stadium: Daejeon World Cup Stadium; Attendance: 13,178; Referee: Lee Jong-Gook |

| 14 May 10 | Chunnam Dragons | 2–0 | Daejeon Citizen | Gwangyang, Jeonnam |
| 17:00 UTC+9 | Shin Young-Jun 68'; Javier Reina 88' | Report | | Stadium: Gwangyang Stadium; Attendance: 4,149; Referee: Lee Min-Hoo |

| 22 May 11 | Daejeon Citizen | 0–0 | Pohang Steelers | Yuseong-gu, Daejeon |
| 15:00 UTC+9 | | Report | | Stadium: Daejeon World Cup Stadium; Attendance: 31,423; Referee: Kim Sang-Woo |

| 29 May 12 | Daejeon Citizen | 2–3 | Jeonbuk Hyundai Motors | Yuseong-gu, Daejeon |
| 19:00 UTC+9 | Hwang Jin-San 18'; Park Sung-Ho 37' (pen.) | Report | Lee Dong-Gook 27', 83'; Lee Seung-Hyun 90' | Stadium: Daejeon World Cup Stadium; Attendance: 12,241; Referee: Kim Jong-hyeok |

| 11 June 13 | Daegu FC | 1–1 | Daejeon Citizen | Buk-gu, Daegu |
| 19:00 UTC+9 | An Sung-Min 51'; Park Jun-Hyuk (red card) 86' | Report | Yoon Si-Ho 57' (o.g.) | Stadium: Daegu Civil Stadium; Attendance: 2,037; Referee: Lee Dong-Jun |

| 18 June 14 | Seongnam Ilhwa Chunma | 2–1 | Daejeon Citizen | Seongnam, Gyeonggi |
| 19:00 UTC+9 | Jeon Sung-Chan 26'; Cho Dong-Geon 72' | Report | Hwang Jin-San 65' | Stadium: Tancheon Sports Complex; Attendance: 8,712; Referee: Lee Sang-Yong |

| 25 June 15 | Daejeon Citizen | 1–3 | Suwon Samsung Bluewings | Yuseong-gu, Daejeon |
| 19:00 UTC+9 | Park Sung-Ho 62'; Lee Ho (yellow card) 61' (yellow-red card) 63' | Report | Yang Joon-A 11'; Lee Sang-ho 39'; Ha Tae-Gyun 90+1' | Stadium: Daejeon World Cup Stadium; Attendance: 4,771; Referee: Moon Jin-Hee |

| 2 July 16 | Daejeon Citizen | 4–4 | Chunnam Dragons | Yuseong-gu, Daejeon |
| 19:00 UTC+9 | Han Doc-Hee 14'; Han Jae-Woong 16', 23'; Wagner 79'; Hwang Jae-Hun (red card) 90+1' | Report | Cornthwaite (yellow card) 43' (red card) 90+1'; Wesley 45+1', 51'; Lee Wan 53'; Lee Byeong-Yun 90+4' | Stadium: Daejeon World Cup Stadium; Attendance: 6,761; Referee: Yoo Seon-Ho |

| 9 July 17 | Pohang Steelers | 7–0 | Daejeon Citizen | Pohang, Gyeongbuk |
| 19:00 UTC+9 | Kim Jae-Sung 5'; Hwang Jin-Sung 30'; Mota 31', 37'; Shin Kwang-Hoon 55'; Ko Moo-Yeol 69'; Kim Gi-Dong 88' (pen.) | Report | | Stadium: Steelyard Stadium; Attendance: 5,473; Referee: Ryu Hee-Seon |

| 16 July 18 | Gyeongnam | 7–1 | Daejeon Citizen | Changwon, Gyeongnam |
| 19:00 UTC+9 | Yoon Bit-Garam 11' (pen.); Lee Hyo-Kyun 15'; Lee Hun 17'; Park Min 42'; DeVere 55'; Jordán 86'; Lucio 89' | Report | Lee Woong-Hee 78' | Stadium: Changwon Football Center; Attendance: 11,256; Referee: Lee Sam-Ho |

| 23 July 19 | Daejeon Citizen | 1–0 | Gangwon | Yuseong-gu, Daejeon |
| 19:00 UTC+9 | Cho Hong-Kyu 48' | Report | | Stadium: Daejeon World Cup Stadium; Attendance: 14,382; Referee: Ko Hyung-Jin |

| 6 August 20 | Suwon Samsung Bluewings | 4–0 | Daejeon Citizen | Suwon, Gyeonggi |
| 19:30 UTC+9 | Kwak Hee-Joo 8'; Yeom Ki-Hun 56'; Lee Sang-ho 69', 90+1' | Report | | Stadium: Suwon World Cup Stadium; Attendance: 24,451; Referee: Choi Kwang-Bo |

| 13 August 21 | Jeju United | 3–3 | Daejeon Citizen | Seogwipo, Jeju |
| 19:00 UTC+9 | Santos 31', 59'; Kang Su-Il 47' | Report | Park Sung-Ho 26', 45+2'; Lee Ho 83' | Stadium: Jeju World Cup Stadium; Attendance: 10,597; Referee: Lim Won-Taek |

| 20 August 22 | Daejeon Citizen | 1–0 | Ulsan Hyundai | Yuseong-gu, Daejeon |
| 19:00 UTC+9 | Wagner 8' | Report | | Stadium: Daejeon World Cup Stadium; Attendance: 9,230; Referee: Hong Jin-Ho |

| 27 August 23 | Incheon United | 2–0 | Daejeon Citizen | Seo-gu, Incheon |
| 19:00 UTC+9 | Jeong Hyuk 7'; Fábio Bahia 82' | Report | Noh Yong-Hun (yellow card) 19' (yellow-red card) 30' | Stadium: Incheon Munhak Stadium; Attendance: 4,619; Referee: Lee Jong-Guk |

| 11 September 24 | Busan I'Park | 1–0 | Daejeon Citizen | Yeonje-gu, Busan |
| 19:00 UTC+9 | Fagner 29' | Report | Kang In-Jun (red card) 22'; Park Min-Keun (yellow card) 19' (yellow-red card) 69' | Stadium: Busan Asiad Stadium; Attendance: 3,124; Referee: Choi Kwang-Bo |

| 17 September 25 | Daejeon Citizen | 2–2 | Daegu | Yuseong-gu, Daejeon |
| 19:00 UTC+9 | Kim Seong-Jun 33'; Park Sung-Ho 85' (pen.) | Report | Song Je-Heon 1', 24' | Stadium: Daejeon World Cup Stadium; Attendance: 12,952; Referee: Ko Keum-Bok |

| 24 September 26 | FC Seoul | 4–1 | Daejeon Citizen | Mapo-gu, Seoul |
| 17:00 UTC+9 | Damjanović 3', 16', 71'; Molina 82' | Report | Lee Sang-Hyup 70' | Stadium: Seoul World Cup Stadium; Attendance: 30,286; Referee: Hong Jin-Ho |

| 1 October 27 | Daejeon Citizen | 0–2 | Seongnam Ilhwa Chunma | Yuseong-gu, Daejeon |
| 15:00 UTC+9 | Lee Sang-Hyup (red card) 85' | Report | Hong Chul 10'; Héverton 13' | Stadium: Daejeon World Cup Stadium; Attendance: 10,351; Referee: Kim Jong-hyeok |

| 16 October 28 | Daejeon Citizen | 1–3 | Sangju Sangmu Phoenix | Yuseong-gu, Daejeon |
| 15:00 UTC+9 | Park Sung-Ho 6' | Report | Ko Cha-Won 27'; Kim Chi-Woo 32'; Kim Min-Soo 36' | Stadium: Daejeon World Cup Stadium; Attendance: 8,591; Referee: Lee Sang-Yong |

| 22 October 29 | Jeonbuk Hyundai Motors | 0–0 | Daejeon Citizen | Jeonju, Jeonbuk |
| 15:00 UTC+9 | Kim Jae-Hwan (yellow card) 37' (yellow-red card) 52' | Report | | Stadium: Jeonju World Cup Stadium; Attendance: 13,721; Referee: Lee Jong-Guk |

| 30 October 30 | Daejeon Citizen | 1–0 | Gwangju | Yuseong-gu, Daejeon |
| 15:00 UTC+9 | Baba 60' | Report | Park Byeong-Ju (red card) 90+3' | Stadium: Daejeon World Cup Stadium; Attendance: 17,441; Referee: Lim Won-Taek |

==== League table ====
| Pos | Team | Pld | W | D | L | GF | GA | GD | Pts |
|---|---|---|---|---|---|---|---|---|---|
| 12 | Daegu FC | 30 | 8 | 9 | 13 | 35 | 46 | −11 | 33 |
| 13 | Incheon United | 30 | 6 | 14 | 10 | 31 | 40 | −9 | 32 |
| 14 | Sangju Sangmu Phoenix | 30 | 7 | 8 | 15 | 36 | 53 | −17 | 29 |
| 15 | Daejeon Citizen | 30 | 6 | 9 | 15 | 31 | 59 | −28 | 27 |
| 16 | Gangwon FC | 30 | 3 | 6 | 21 | 14 | 45 | −31 | 15 |

Source: K League
Rules for classification: 1) Points; 2) Goal difference; 3) Goals scored

| Pos | Team | Qualification |
|---|---|---|
| 1 | Jeonbuk Hyundai Motors (C) | Qualification for the Champions League group stage |
| 2 | Ulsan Hyundai | Qualification for the Champions League group stage |
| 3 | Pohang Steelers | Qualification for the Champions League playoff round |
| 4 | Suwon Samsung Bluewings | |
| 5 | FC Seoul | |
| 6 | Busan IPark | |

Source: RSSSF
(C) Champions

==== Results summary ====
| Overall | | | | | | | | Home | | | | | | Away | | | | | |
| Pld | W | D | L | GF | GA | GD | Pts | W | D | L | GF | GA | GD | W | D | L | GF | GA | GD |
|---|---|---|---|---|---|---|---|---|---|---|---|---|---|---|---|---|---|---|---|
| 30 | 6 | 9 | 15 | 31 | 59 | −28 | 27 | 4 | 5 | 6 | 18 | 23 | −5 | 2 | 4 | 9 | 13 | 36 | −23 |

==== Results by round ====
| Round | 1 | 2 | 3 | 4 | 5 | 6 | 7 | 8 | 9 | 10 | 11 | 12 | 13 | 14 | 15 | 16 | 17 | 18 | 19 | 20 | 21 | 22 | 23 | 24 | 25 | 26 | 27 | 28 | 29 | 30 |
|---|---|---|---|---|---|---|---|---|---|---|---|---|---|---|---|---|---|---|---|---|---|---|---|---|---|---|---|---|---|---|
| Ground | A | H | H | A | H | A | H | A | H | A | H | H | A | A | H | H | A | A | H | A | A | H | A | A | H | A | H | H | A | H |
| Result | W | D | W | W | D | D | L | L | L | L | D | L | D | L | L | D | L | L | W | L | D | W | L | L | D | L | L | L | D | W |
| Position | 4 | 4 | 2 | 1 | 1 | 3 | 5 | 6 | 8 | 12 | 12 | 14 | 13 | 15 | 15 | 14 | 15 | 15 | 14 | 15 | 15 | 15 | 15 | 15 | 15 | 15 | 15 | 15 | 15 | 15 |

Updated to match(es) played on 30 October 2011. Source: League Fixtures and Results
A = Away; H = Home; W = Win; D = Draw; L = Loss

=== Korean FA Cup ===
| 18 May Round of 32 | Gimhae City | 0–3 | Daejeon Citizen | Gimhae, Gyeongnam |
| 19:00 UTC+9 | | | Park Sung-Ho 13'; Han Jae-Woong 59'; Kim Ba-Woo 87' | Stadium: Gimhae Stadium; Attendance: 600 |

| 15 June Round of 16 | Gangwon FC | 1–1 (a.e.t.) (4–3 p) | Daejeon Citizen | Gangneung, Gangwon |
| 19:00 UTC+9 | Džakmić 40' | | Park Sung-Ho 77' | Stadium: Gangneung Stadium; Attendance: 3,212; Referee: Kim Dong-Jin |
| | Penalties |
| | Lee Sang-don (penalty missed); Jang Hyuk-Jin (penalty missed); Kwak Kwang-Seon (penalty scored); Džakmić (penalty missed); Kwon Soon-Hyung (penalty scored); Kim Jung-Joo (penalty missed); Kim Jin-Hwan (penalty scored); Seo Dong-Hyun (penalty missed); Park Sang-Jin (penalty scored) | | (penalty missed) Wagner; (penalty scored) Lee Ho; (penalty missed) Hwang Jae-Hun; (penalty missed) Kim Seong-Jun; (penalty scored) Park Sung-Ho; (penalty missed) Kim Han-Seob; (penalty scored) Han Doc-Hee; (penalty missed) Choi Eun-Sung; (penalty missed) Kim Do-yeon |

=== League Cup ===
| 16 March Group round | Incheon United | 3–0 | Daejeon Citizen | Seo-gu, Incheon |
| 19:00 UTC+9 | Kim Myung-Woon 38'; Yoo Byung-Soo 50'; Kapadze 71' | Report | | Stadium: Incheon Munhak Stadium; Attendance: 4,256; Referee: Ryu Hee-Seon |

| 6 April Group round | Daejeon Citizen | 0 –3 | Pohang Steelers | Yuseong-gu, Daejeon |
| 19:30 UTC+9 | Kim Do-yeon (yellow card) 39' (yellow-red card) 74' | Report | Adriano Chuva 17', 23'; No Byung-Jun 84' | Stadium: Daejeon World Cup Stadium; Attendance: 4,785; Referee: Choi Kwang-Bo |

| 20 April Group round | Seongnam Ilhwa Chunma | 1–0 | Daejeon Citizen | Seongnam, Gyeonggi |
| 20:00 UTC+9 | Cho Dong-Geon 83' | Report | | Stadium: Tancheon Sports Complex; Attendance: 1,534; Referee: Ko Keum-Bok |

| 5 May Group round | Gyeongnam FC | 3–0 | Daejeon Citizen | Changwon, Gyeongnam |
| 15:00 UTC+9 | Han Kyung-In 30'; Yoon Bit-Garam 56'; Lucio 89' | Report | | Stadium: Changwon Football Center; Attendance: 11,826; Referee: Lee Min-Hoo |

| 11 May Group round | Daejeon Citizen | 1–1 | Daegu FC | Yuseong-gu, Daejeon |
| 15:00 UTC+9 | Park Min-Keun 12' | Report | Hwang Il-Su 28' | Stadium: Daejeon World Cup Stadium; Attendance: 1,775; Referee: Woo Sang-Il |

== Squad statistics ==
=== Appearances and goals ===
Statistics accurate as of match played 30 October 2011

Numbers in parentheses denote appearances as substitute.

| No. | Nat. | Pos. | Name | League | | FA Cup | | League Cup | | Total | |
| No. | Nat. | Pos. | Name | Apps | Goals | Apps | Goals | Apps | Goals | Apps | Goals |
|---|---|---|---|---|---|---|---|---|---|---|---|
| 2 | KOR | DF | Park Jung-Hye | 10 | 0 | 0 | 0 | 0 | 0 | 10 (0) | 0 |
| 4 | KOR | DF | Park Kun-Young | 5 (2) | 0 | 1 | 0 | 2 | 0 | 8 (2) | 0 |
| 5 | KOR | DF | Kim Young-Bin | 8 (1) | 0 | 0 | 0 | 0 | 0 | 8 (1) | 0 |
| 6 | KOR | DF | Cho Hong-Kyu | 5 (2) | 1 | 0 | 0 | 1 | 0 | 6 (2) | 1 |
| 7 | KOR | MF | Kim Seong-Jun | 29 | 2 | 2 | 0 | 0 (1) | 0 | 31 (1) | 2 |
| 8 | KOR | MF | Lee Hyun-Woong | 5 | 0 | 0 | 0 | 0 | 0 | 5 (0) | 0 |
| 9 | BRA | FW | Wagner | 25 (2) | 7 | 2 | 0 | 0 | 0 | 27 (2) | 7 |
| 11 | KOR | FW | Park Sung-Ho | 28 | 8 | 2 | 2 | 0 (1) | 0 | 30 (1) | 10 |
| 13 | KOR | DF | Kim Chang-Hoon | 28 | 1 | 2 | 0 | 1 | 0 | 31 (0) | 1 |
| 14 | JPN | MF | Yuta Baba | 3 (3) | 1 | 0 | 0 | 0 | 0 | 3 (3) | 1 |
| 15 | KOR | FW | Kim Jin-Sol | 0 (2) | 0 | 0 | 0 | 1 (1) | 0 | 1 (3) | 0 |
| 16 | KOR | FW | Hwang Hun-Hee | 0 (1) | 0 | 0 | 0 | 1 (1) | 0 | 1 (2) | 0 |
| 17 | KOR | MF | Han Jae-Woong | 23 | 3 | 2 | 1 | 2 | 0 | 27 (0) | 4 |
| 18 | KOR | MF | Kang In-Jun | 0 (1) | 0 | 0 | 0 | 0 | 0 | 0 (1) | 0 |
| 19 | KOR | DF | Jun Sang-Hoon | 0 | 0 | 0 | 0 | 4 | 0 | 4 (0) | 0 |
| 20 | KOR | DF | Lee Ho | 24 (1) | 1 | 2 | 0 | 0 | 0 | 26 (1) | 1 |
| 21 | KOR | GK | Choi Eun-Sung | 28 | 0 | 1 | 0 | 0 | 0 | 29 (0) | 0 |
| 22 | KOR | MF | Park Min-Keun | 9 (6) | 0 | 0 (1) | 0 | 3 | 1 | 12 (7) | 1 |
| 23 | KOR | FW | Jeon Bo-Hoon | 1 (4) | 0 | 0 | 0 | 0 | 0 | 1 (4) | 0 |
| 24 | KOR | MF | Kim Tae-Yeon | 10 (1) | 0 | 0 | 0 | 0 | 0 | 10 (1) | 0 |
| 25 | KOR | MF | Lee Sang-Hyup | 1 (6) | 1 | 0 | 0 | 0 | 0 | 1 (6) | 1 |
| 26 | KOR | FW | Kim Ju-Hyoung | 0 (1) | 0 | 0 (1) | 0 | 1 | 0 | 1 (2) | 0 |
| 27 | KOR | MF | Lee Hyun-Ho | 0 | 0 | 0 | 0 | 0 (1) | 0 | 0 (1) | 0 |
| 28 | KOR | DF | Kim Jin-Man | 0 | 0 | 0 | 0 | 0 (1) | 0 | 0 (1) | 0 |
| 29 | KOR | MF | Kim Do-yeon | 1 (6) | 0 | 0 (1) | 0 | 1 (1) | 0 | 2 (8) | 0 |
| 30 | KOR | DF | Choi Hyun-Bin | 0 | 0 | 0 | 0 | 0 | 0 | 0 | 0 |
| 31 | KOR | GK | Jung Gyu-Jin | 0 | 0 | 0 | 0 | 0 | 0 | 0 | 0 |
| 33 | KOR | DF | Lee Woong-Hee | 6 (7) | 1 | 0 | 0 | 4 | 0 | 10 (7) | 1 |
| 35 | KOR | DF | Lee Sang-Hee | 3 | 0 | 0 | 0 | 3 | 0 | 6 (0) | 0 |
| 36 | KOR | FW | Jung Yeon-Woong | 0 | 0 | 0 | 0 | 1 | 0 | 1 (0) | 0 |
| 37 | KOR | MF | Noh Yong-Hun | 10 | 0 | 0 | 0 | 0 | 0 | 10 (0) | 0 |
| 38 | KOR | MF | Go Dae-Woo | 0 (4) | 0 | 0 | 0 | 0 (1) | 0 | 0 (5) | 0 |
| 39 | KOR | MF | Choi Wang-Gil | 0 | 0 | 0 | 0 | 0 (1) | 0 | 0 (1) | 0 |
| 40 | KOR | MF | Cho Eui-Kwon | 0 | 0 | 0 | 0 | 0 | 0 | 0 | 0 |
| 41 | KOR | GK | Choi Hyun | 2 | 0 | 1 | 0 | 3 | 0 | 6 (0) | 0 |
| 42 | KOR | MF | Han Doc-Hee | 11 (3) | 1 | 0 (2) | 0 | 2 | 0 | 13 (5) | 1 |
| 44 | KOR | MF | Hwang Jin-San | 18 (10) | 2 | 2 | 0 | 3 | 0 | 23 (10) | 2 |
| 45 | KOR | DF | Park Seon-Woo | 0 | 0 | 0 | 0 | 0 | 0 | 0 | 0 |
| 46 | KOR | MF | Kim Kyung-Kuk | 0 | 0 | 0 | 0 | 1 | 0 | 1 (0) | 0 |
| 70 | KOR | FW | Kim Ji-min | 0 | 0 | 0 | 0 | 0 | 0 | 0 | 0 |
| 71 | KOR | DF | Yoon Sin-Young | 0 | 0 | 0 | 0 | 0 | 0 | 0 | 0 |
| 72 | KOR | FW | Kwak Chul-Ho | 0 | 0 | 0 | 0 | 0 | 0 | 0 | 0 |
| 73 | KOR | FW | Lee Je-Kyu | 0 | 0 | 0 | 0 | 0 | 0 | 0 | 0 |
| 74 | KOR | DF | Yoo Min-Chul | 0 | 0 | 0 | 0 | 0 | 0 | 0 | 0 |
| 1 | KOR | GK | Sin Jun-Bae (out) | 0 (1) | 0 | 0 | 0 | 2 | 0 | 2 (1) | 0 |
| 3 | KOR | DF | Kim Han-Seob (out) | 18 | 0 | 2 | 0 | 1 | 0 | 21 (0) | 0 |
| 10 | BRA | FW | Wésley Brasilia (out) | 0 (1) | 0 | 0 | 0 | 0 (1) | 0 | 0 (2) | 0 |
| 12 | KOR | MF | Kang Gu-Nam (out) | 0 (3) | 0 | 0 | 0 | 2 (1) | 0 | 2 (4) | 0 |
| 14 | KOR | MF | Kim Ba-Woo (out) | 3 (3) | 0 | 1 | 0 | 3 | 0 | 7 (3) | 0 |
| 18 | KOR | FW | Kwak Chang-Hee (out) | 1 | 0 | 0 (1) | 1 | 4 | 0 | 5 (1) | 1 |
| 23 | KOR | DF | Yang Jung-Min (out) | 1 (2) | 0 | 0 | 0 | 2 | 0 | 3 (2) | 0 |
| 24 | KOR | DF | Lee Jung-Won (out) | 0 (4) | 0 | 0 | 0 | 2 (2) | 0 | 2 (6) | 0 |
| 25 | KOR | MF | Park Sang-Wook (out) | 0 | 0 | 0 | 0 | 1 | 0 | 1 (0) | 0 |
| 32 | KOR | DF | Lee Myeong-Cheol (out) | 0 | 0 | 0 | 0 | 2 | 0 | 2 (0) | 0 |
| 37 | KOR | DF | Hwang Jae-Hun (out) | 14 | 1 | 2 | 0 | 0 | 0 | 16 (0) | 1 |
| 43 | CHN | MF | Bai Zijian (out) | 0 (9) | 0 | 0 | 0 | 3 (2) | 0 | 3 (11) | 0 |

=== Top scorers ===
| Rank | Nation | Number | Name | K-League | KFA Cup | League Cup | Total |
|---|---|---|---|---|---|---|---|
| 1 | (South Korea) | 11 | Park Sung-Ho | 8 | 2 | 0 | 10 |
| 2 | (Brazil) | 9 | Wagner | 7 | 0 | 0 | 7 |
| 3 | (South Korea) | 17 | Han Jae-Woong | 3 | 1 | 0 | 4 |
| 4 | (South Korea) | 7 | Kim Seong-Jun | 2 | 0 | 0 | 2 |
| = | (South Korea) | 44 | Hwang Jin-San | 2 | 0 | 0 | 2 |
| 5 | (South Korea) | 6 | Cho Hong-Kyu | 1 | 0 | 0 | 1 |
| = | (South Korea) | 13 | Kim Chang-Hoon | 1 | 0 | 0 | 1 |
| = | (Japan) | 14 | Yuta Baba | 1 | 0 | 0 | 1 |
| = | (South Korea) | 20 | Lee Ho | 1 | 0 | 0 | 1 |
| = | (South Korea) | 25 | Lee Sang-Hyup | 1 | 0 | 0 | 1 |
| = | (South Korea) | 33 | Lee Woong-Hee | 1 | 0 | 0 | 1 |
| = | (South Korea) | 37 | Hwang Jae-Hun | 1 | 0 | 0 | 1 |
| = | (South Korea) | 42 | Han Doc-Hee | 1 | 0 | 0 | 1 |
| = | (South Korea) | 18 | Kwak Chang-Hee | 0 | 1 | 0 | 1 |
| = | (South Korea) | 22 | Park Min-Keun | 0 | 0 | 1 | 1 |
| / | / | / | Own Goals | 1 | 0 | 0 | 1 |
| / | / | / | TOTALS | 31 | 4 | 1 | 36 |

=== Top assistors ===
| Rank | Nation | Number | Name | K-League | KFA Cup | League Cup | Total |
|---|---|---|---|---|---|---|---|
| 1 | (South Korea) | 7 | Kim Seong-Jun | 5 | 0 | 0 | 5 |
| 2 | (South Korea) | 42 | Han Doc-Hee | 2 | 0 | 0 | 2 |
| = | (South Korea) | 3 | Kim Han-Seob | 1 | 1 | 0 | 2 |
| = | (South Korea) | 17 | Han Jae-Woong | 1 | 1 | 0 | 2 |
| = | (South Korea) | 22 | Park Min-Keun | 1 | 1 | 0 | 2 |
| 3 | (South Korea) | 8 | Lee Hyun-Woong | 1 | 0 | 0 | 1 |
| = | (Brazil) | 9 | Wagner | 1 | 0 | 0 | 1 |
| = | (South Korea) | 11 | Park Sung-Ho | 1 | 0 | 0 | 1 |
| = | (South Korea) | 20 | Lee Ho | 1 | 0 | 0 | 1 |
| = | (South Korea) | 37 | Hwang Jae-Hun | 1 | 0 | 0 | 1 |
| = | (South Korea) | 37 | Noh Yong-Hun | 1 | 0 | 0 | 1 |
| = | (China) | 43 | Bai Zijian | 1 | 0 | 0 | 1 |
| = | (South Korea) | 44 | Hwang Jin-San | 1 | 0 | 0 | 1 |
| / | / | / | TOTALS | 19 | 3 | 0 | 22 |

=== Discipline ===
| Position | Nation | Number | Name | K-League | | KFA Cup | | League Cup | | Total | |
| Position | Nation | Number | Name | Booked | Sent off (straight red) | Booked | Sent off (straight red) | Booked | Sent off (straight red) | Booked | Sent off (straight red) |
| DF | (South Korea) | 2 | Park Jung-Hye | 1 | 0 | 0 | 0 | 0 | 0 | 1 | 0 |
| DF | (South Korea) | 3 | Kim Han-Seob | 4 | 0 | 0 | 0 | 0 | 0 | 4 | 0 |
| DF | (South Korea) | 4 | Park Kun-Young | 0 | 0 | 1 | 0 | 1 | 0 | 2 | 0 |
| DF | (South Korea) | 5 | Kim Young-Bin | 1 | 0 | 0 | 0 | 0 | 0 | 1 | 0 |
| DF | (South Korea) | 6 | Cho Hong-Kyu | 2 | 0 | 0 | 0 | 0 | 0 | 2 | 0 |
| MF | (South Korea) | 7 | Kim Seong-Jun | 4 | 0 | 1 | 0 | 0 | 0 | 5 | 0 |
| FW | (Brazil) | 9 | Wagner | 2 | 0 | 0 | 0 | 0 | 0 | 2 | 0 |
| FW | (Brazil) | 10 | Wésley Brasilia | 1 | 0 | 0 | 0 | 0 | 0 | 1 | 0 |
| FW | (South Korea) | 11 | Park Sung-Ho | 7 | 0 | 1 | 0 | 0 | 0 | 8 | 0 |
| MF | (South Korea) | 12 | Kang Gu-Nam | 1 | 0 | 0 | 0 | 0 | 0 | 1 | 0 |
| DF | (South Korea) | 13 | Kim Chang-Hoon | 4 | 0 | 0 | 0 | 0 | 0 | 4 | 0 |
| MF | (South Korea) | 14 | Kim Ba-Woo | 0 | 0 | 0 | 0 | 1 | 0 | 1 | 0 |
| FW | (South Korea) | 15 | Kim Jin-Sol | 1 | 0 | 0 | 0 | 1 | 0 | 2 | 0 |
| MF | (South Korea) | 17 | Han Jae-Woong | 6 | 1 | 0 | 0 | 0 | 0 | 6 | 1 |
| FW | (South Korea) | 18 | Kwak Chang-Hee | 1 | 0 | 1 | 0 | 0 | 0 | 2 | 0 |
| MF | (South Korea) | 18 | Kang In-Jun | 0 | 1 | 0 | 0 | 0 | 0 | 0 | 1 |
| DF | (South Korea) | 20 | Lee Ho | 8 | 1 | 1 | 0 | 0 | 0 | 9 | 1 |
| MF | (South Korea) | 22 | Park Min-Keun | 4 | 1 | 0 | 0 | 1 | 0 | 5 | 1 |
| DF | (South Korea) | 23 | Yang Jung-Min | 2 | 0 | 0 | 0 | 2 | 1 | 4 | 1 |
| DF | (South Korea) | 24 | Lee Jung-Won | 0 | 0 | 0 | 0 | 1 | 0 | 1 | 0 |
| MF | (South Korea) | 24 | Kim Tae-Yeon | 1 | 0 | 0 | 0 | 0 | 0 | 1 | 0 |
| MF | (South Korea) | 25 | Lee Sang-Hyup | 1 | 1 | 0 | 0 | 0 | 0 | 1 | 1 |
| MF | (South Korea) | 29 | Kim Do-yeon | 0 | 0 | 0 | 0 | 2 | 1 | 2 | 1 |
| MF | (South Korea) | 33 | Lee Woong-Hee | 0 | 0 | 0 | 0 | 1 | 0 | 1 | 0 |
| DF | (South Korea) | 35 | Lee Sang-Hee | 0 | 1 | 0 | 0 | 1 | 0 | 1 | 1 |
| DF | (South Korea) | 37 | Hwang Jae-Hun | 2 | 1 | 0 | 0 | 0 | 0 | 2 | 1 |
| MF | (South Korea) | 37 | Noh Yong-Hun | 3 | 1 | 0 | 0 | 0 | 0 | 3 | 1 |
| MF | (South Korea) | 38 | Go Dae-Woo | 1 | 0 | 0 | 0 | 0 | 0 | 1 | 0 |
| MF | (South Korea) | 42 | Han Doc-Hee | 1 | 0 | 0 | 0 | 1 | 0 | 2 | 0 |
| MF | (China) | 43 | Bai Zijian | 1 | 0 | 0 | 0 | 0 | 0 | 1 | 0 |
| MF | (South Korea) | 44 | Hwang Jin-San | 2 | 0 | 0 | 0 | 0 | 0 | 2 | 0 |
| / | / | / | TOTALS | 61 | 8 | 5 | 0 | 12 | 2 | 78 | 10 |

== Transfer ==
=== In ===
- 9 November 2010 – (South Korea) Park Kun-Young – Yeungnam University (Draft)
- 9 November 2010 – (South Korea) Hwang Hun-Hee – FC Metalurh Zaporizhya (Draft)
- 9 November 2010 – (South Korea) Jeong Yeon-Woong – Daejeon Citizen Youth (Draft)
- 9 November 2010 – (South Korea) Jeong Gyu-Jin – Sangji University (Draft)
- 9 November 2010 – (South Korea) Jeon Sang-Hoon – Yonsei University (Draft)
- 9 November 2010 – (South Korea) Kim Jin-Man – Sunmoon University (Draft)
- 9 November 2010 – (South Korea) Kim Do-yeon – Yewon Arts University (Draft)
- 9 November 2010 – (South Korea) Lee Myeong-Cheol – Inje University (Draft)
- 9 November 2010 – (South Korea) Lee Sang-Hee – Hongik University (Draft)
- 9 November 2010 – (South Korea) Lee Woong-Hee – Pai Chai University (Draft)
- 12 July 2011 – (South Korea) Noh Yong-Hun – Busan I'Park
- 28 July 2011 – (South Korea) Kim Young-Bin – Incheon United (transfer)
- 28 July 2011 – (South Korea) Jeon Bo-Hoon – Incheon United (transfer)
- 28 July 2011 – (South Korea) Kim Tae-Yeon – Tokyo Verdy
- 28 July 2011 – (South Korea) Kang In-Jun – Jeju United
- 28 July 2011 – (South Korea) Lee Sang-Hyup – Jeju United (loan)
- 28 July 2011 – (Japan) Yuta Baba – Tokyo Verdy
- 28 July 2011 – (South Korea) Choi Hyun-Bin – FC Seoul (loan)
- 21 September 2011 – (South Korea) Kim Ji-min – Sangju Sangmu Phoenix (military service end)
- 21 September 2011 – (South Korea) Yoon Sin-Young – Sangju Sangmu Phoenix (military service end)
- 21 September 2011 – (South Korea) Lee Je-Kyu – Sangju Sangmu Phoenix (military service end)
- 21 September 2011 – (South Korea) Kwak Chul-Ho – Sangju Sangmu Phoenix (military service end)
- 14 October 2011 – (South Korea) Yoo Min-Chul – National Police Agency FC (military service end)

=== Out ===
- November 2010 – (South Korea) Ou Kyoung-Jun (FW) – FC Seoul (loan end)
- November 2010 – (South Korea) Ko Ki-Gu (FW) – Pohang Steelers (loan end)
- November 2010 – (Brazil) Alexandre (MF) – Free agent (contract end)
- November 2010 – (Brazil) Zacarias (DF) – Free agent (contract end)
- November 2010 – (South Korea) Ko Myung-Sik (DF) – Free agent (contract end)
- November 2010 – (South Korea) Lee Joon-Keun (GK) – Free agent (contract end)
- November 2010 – (South Korea) Jeon Dong-Min (MF) – Free agent (contract end)
- November 2010 – (South Korea) Kim Gyung-Do (DF) – Free agent (contract end)
- November 2010 – (South Korea) Lee Seung-Mok (MF) – Free agent (contract end)
- November 2010 – (South Korea) Kim Sang-Duk (MF) – Free agent (contract end)
- November 2010 – (South Korea) Ko Dae-Woo (MF) – Free agent (contract end)
- November 2010 – (South Korea) Kwon Hyuk-Jin (DF) – Free agent (contract end)
- November 2010 – (South Korea) Hwang Ji-Yoon (DF) – Sangju Sangmu Phoenix (military duty)
- November 2010 – (South Korea) Lee Jong-Chan (DF) – Sangju Sangmu Phoenix (military duty)
- November 2010 – (South Korea) Jung Hyung-Joon (DF) – National Police Agency FC (military duty)
- November 2010 – (South Korea) Kim Dae-Wook (DF) – National Police Agency FC (military duty)
- November 2010 – (South Korea) Lee Seung-Won (DF) – National Police Agency FC (military duty)
- 17 June 2011 – (South Korea) Park Sang-Wook (MF) – Released (contract terminated)
- 17 June 2011 – (South Korea) Kim Ba-Woo (MF) – Released (contract terminated)
- 17 June 2011 – (South Korea) Sin Jun-Bae (GK) – Released (contract terminated)
- 17 June 2011 – (South Korea) Yang Jung-Min (DF) – Released (contract terminated)
- 17 June 2011 – (South Korea) Kwak Chang-Hee (FW) – Released (contract terminated)
- 17 June 2011 – (South Korea) Kang Gu-Nam (MF) – Released (contract terminated)
- 17 June 2011 – (South Korea) Lee Jung-Won (DF) – Released (contract terminated)
- 17 June 2011 – (South Korea) Lee Myeong-Cheol (DF) – Released (contract terminated)
- 12 July 2011 – (South Korea) Hwang Jae-Hun (DF) – Busan I'Park (transfer)
- 12 July 2011 – (Brazil) Wésley Brasilia – Free Agent
- 28 July 2011 – (South Korea) Kim Han-Seob – Incheon United (transfer)
- 28 July 2011 – (China) Bai Zijian – Released
