= 2011 Korean FA Cup =

2011 Hana Bank FA Cup

Tournament details
- Country: South Korea
- Teams: 47

Final positions
- Champions: Seongnam Ilhwa Chunma (2nd title)
- Runners-up: Suwon Samsung Bluewings

Tournament statistics
- Matches played: 46
- Goals scored: 136 (2.96 per match)
- Top goal scorer: Go Seul-ki (4 goals)

Awards
- Best player: Cho Dong-geon

The 2011 Korean FA Cup, known as the 2011 Hana Bank FA Cup, was the 16th edition of Korean FA Cup. Seongnam Ilhwa Chunma became champions and qualified for the 2012 AFC Champions League.

== Schedule ==
Round	Date	Matches	Clubs remaining	Clubs involved	New entries this round
First round	12 March 2011	8	47	16	8 K3 League teams 8 university teams
Second round	10 April 2011	7	39	8+6	5 Korea National League teams 1 K3 League team
Round of 32	18 May 2011	16	32	7+25	16 K League teams 9 Korea National League teams
Round of 16	15 June 2011	8	16	16	None
Quarter-finals	27 July 2011	4	8	8	None
Semi-finals	24 August 2011	2	4	4	None
Final	15 October 2011	1	2	2	None

== Teams ==
Entry round	Participating teams		
Round of 32	K League All 16 teams of the 2011 season		Korea National League Top 9 teams of the 2010 season
Round of 32	Busan IPark; Daegu FC; Daejeon Citizen; FC Seoul; Gangwon FC; Gwangju FC; Gyeongnam FC; Incheon United; Jeju United; Jeonbuk Hyundai Motors; Jeonnam Dragons; Pohang Steelers; Sangju Sangmu Phoenix; Seongnam Ilhwa Chunma; Suwon Samsung Bluewings; Ulsan Hyundai		Busan Transportation Corporation; Changwon City; Cheonan City; Chungju Hummel; Gangneung City; Goyang KB Kookmin Bank; Suwon City; Hyundai Mipo Dockyard; Yongin City
Second round	Korea National League Rest 5 teams of the 2011 season		K3 League Champions of the 2010 season
Second round	Ansan Hallelujah; Daejeon KHNP; Gimhae City; Incheon Korail; Mokpo City		Gyeongju Citizen
First round	K3 League Top 8 teams of the 2010 season excluding champions		
First round	Bucheon FC 1995; Cheongju Jikji; Icheon Citizen; Jeonju EM; Namyangju United; FC Pocheon; Seoul United; Yangju Citizen		
First round	U-League Top 4 teams of the 2010 season	National University League (Spring) Champions of the 2010 season	National University League (Autumn) Champions of the 2010 season
First round	Yonsei University; Kyung Hee University; Honam University; Kwangwoon University	Yeungnam University	Dongguk University
First round	Yonsei University; Kyung Hee University; Honam University; Kwangwoon University	National University Championship Champions of the 2010 season	Korean National Sports Festival Champions of the 2010 season
First round	Yonsei University; Kyung Hee University; Honam University; Kwangwoon University	Korea University	Konkuk University

== Qualifying rounds ==
The first round was held on 12 March 2011 and the second round was held on 10 April 2011.

=== First round ===
The draw for the first round was held on 10 February 2011.

12 March 2011	Seoul United	3–4	Kwangwoon University	Madel Stadium, Nowon
13:00 KST	Lee Jae-myung 10'; Kwak Seon-ho 72', 76'		Kim Ryun-do 4', 47'; Kim Hyun-woo 9'; Kim Min-hyuk 84'	Attendance: 150

12 March 2011	Cheongju Jikji	1–3	Konkuk University	Cheongju Yongjeong Center, Cheongju
14:00 KST	Kwak Seung-hyun 54'		Ju Se-jong 59'; Han Bit 82'; Lee Han-saem 87'	Attendance: 250

12 March 2011	Bucheon FC 1995	2–3 (a.e.t.)	Kyung Hee University	Bucheon Stadium, Bucheon
14:00 KST	Shin Kang-sun 45'; Park Moon-ki 56'		Lee Kwang-sun 13'; Kim Dong-ki 57'; Kim Jeong-se 104'; Kim Dong-wook (yellow card) 38' (yellow-red card) 120'	Attendance: 320

12 March 2011	FC Pocheon	4–1	Korea University	Pocheon Stadium, Pocheon
14:00 KST	Kim Yul-jin 16'; Shin Ok-jin 29'; Lee Hoo-sun 51'; Cho Sung-hwan 71'		Jung Jae-yong 68'	Attendance: 320

12 March 2011	Jeonju EM	1–4	Dongguk University	Jeonju University, Jeonju
14:00 KST	Park Sang-je 73'; Kim Seung-myung (red card) 90'		Hwang Myung-kyu 9', 43'; Lee Ki-je 41'; Jung Chan-il (yellow card) 54' (yellow-red card) 79'; Jung Hae-woong (red card) 55'; Lee Ho-seok 90+2'	Attendance: 300

12 March 2011	Yeungnam University	4–0	Namyangju United	Yeungnam University, Gyeongsan
14:00 KST	Lee Hyun-do 29'; Lee Jin-seok 43'; Jung Dae-kyo 82', 83'			Attendance: 250

12 March 2011	Honam University	4–0	Yangju Citizen	Honam University, Gwangju
14:00 KST	Lee Jeong-won 18', 59'; Jang Se-young 63'; Jung Min-woo 84'			Attendance: 500

12 March 2011	Yonsei University	2–2 (a.e.t.) (6–5 p)	Icheon Citizen	Yonsei University, Seoul
14:00 KST	Hwang Ui-jo 30'; Lee Yong-wook 44'		Jung Joon-ho 45'; Yang Ji-hoon 70'	Attendance: 210
	Penalties
	? (penalty scored) ? (penalty scored) ? (penalty scored) ? (penalty scored) ? (penalty scored); Kim Do-hyuk (penalty scored)		(penalty scored) ? (penalty scored) ? (penalty scored) ? (penalty scored) ? (penalty scored) ? (penalty missed) Jeon Byung-gil

=== Second round ===
The draw for the second round was held on 12 March 2011.

10 April 2011	Ansan Hallelujah	2–1	Kwangwoon University	Ansan Wa~ Stadium, Ansan
14:00 KST	Lee Hoo-kwon 22' (o.g.); Kim Dong-hyo 74'		Kim Hyun-woo 77'	Attendance: 250

10 April 2011	Changwon City	0–1 (a.e.t.)	Yonsei University	Changwon Civic Stadium, Changwon
15:00 KST			Kim Hyun-soo 115'	Attendance: 300

10 April 2011	Gimhae City	1–0	Honam University	Gimhae Stadium, Gimhae
19:00 KST	Kim Won-min 86'			Attendance: 800

10 April 2011	Kyung Hee University	1–0 (a.e.t.)	Incheon Korail	Yongin Football Center, Yongin
14:00 KST	Yoo Dong-won 101'			Attendance: 225

10 April 2011	Yeungnam University	0–2	Mokpo City	Yeungnam University, Gyeongsan
14:00 KST			Jung Soo-jong 79'; Kim Hyun-yong 89'	Attendance: 300

10 April 2011	Gyeongju Citizen	1–2	Konkuk University	Gyeongju Stadium, Gyeongju
14:00 KST	Yoon Chul-soon 70'		Cho Young-joon 33'; Kim Min-ki 76'	Attendance: 500

10 April 2011	FC Pocheon	3–1	Dongguk University	Pocheon Stadium, Pocheon
14:00 KST	Kim Yul-jin 18'; Lee Hoo-sun 90'; Nam Tae-hee 90+1'		Lee Young-deok 12'	Attendance: 450

== Final rounds ==
=== Bracket ===
Round of 32
Pohang Steelers	2
Daejeon KHNP	0
Daegu FC	2
Hyundai Mipo Dockyard (a.e.t.)	3
Gyeongnam FC	1
Busan Transportation Corporation	2
FC Seoul	4
Yongin City	0
Incheon United	2
Yonsei University	1
Seongnam Ilhwa Chunma	3
Mokpo City	0
Jeonbuk Hyundai Motors	2
Kyung Hee University	1
Busan IPark	2
Cheonan City	1
Ulsan Hyundai	1
Ansan Hallelujah	0
Sangju Sangmu Phoenix (a.e.t.)	2
Gangneung City	1
Gangwon FC (p)	0 (4)
Chungju Hummel	0 (3)
Daejeon Citizen	3
Gimhae City	0
Gwangju FC	1
Suwon City (a.e.t.)	2
Suwon Samsung Bluewings	3
FC Pocheon	1
Jeonnam Dragons	1
Konkuk University	0
Jeju United	4
Goyang KB Kookmin Bank	2

Round of 16
Pohang Steelers	1
Hyundai Mipo Dockyard	0
Busan Transportation Corporation	0
FC Seoul	1
Incheon United	0
Seongnam Ilhwa Chunma	2
Jeonbuk Hyundai Motors	1
Busan IPark	2
Ulsan Hyundai (a.e.t.)	2
Sangju Sangmu Phoenix	1
Gangwon FC (p)	1 (4)
Daejeon Citizen	1 (3)
Suwon City	0
Suwon Samsung Bluewings	1
Jeonnam Dragons (a.e.t.)	1
Jeju United	0

Quarter-finals
Pohang Steelers (a.e.t.)	4
FC Seoul	2
Seongnam Ilhwa Chunma	2
Busan IPark	1
Ulsan Hyundai	3
Gangwon FC	0
Suwon Samsung Bluewings	1
Jeonnam Dragons	0

Semi-finals
24 August – Seongnam
Pohang Steelers	0
Seongnam Ilhwa Chunma	3
24 August – Suwon
Ulsan Hyundai	2
Suwon Samsung Bluewings (a.e.t.)	3

Final
15 October – Seongnam
Seongnam Ilhwa Chunma	1
Suwon Samsung Bluewings	0

=== Round of 32 ===
The draw for the round of 32 was held on 25 April 2011.

18 May 2011	Seongnam Ilhwa Chunma	3–0	Mokpo City	Tancheon Sports Complex, Seongnam
19:00 KST	Ognenovski 42'; Namgung Do 51'; Jo Jae-cheol 78'			Attendance: 518

18 May 2011	Jeonnam Dragons	1–0	Konkuk University	Gwangyang Football Stadium, Gwangyang
19:00 KST	Índio 62'			Attendance: 1,104

18 May 2011	Jeonbuk Hyundai Motors	2–1	Kyung Hee University	Jeonju World Cup Stadium, Jeonju
19:00 KST	Eninho 47'; Luiz Henrique 59'		Kim Hwan-hee 13'	Attendance: 1,273

18 May 2011	Suwon Samsung Bluewings	3–1	FC Pocheon	Suwon World Cup Stadium, Suwon
19:30 KST	Bergson 61'; Park Jong-jin 69'; Choi Sung-kuk 78'		Kim Young-joong 88'	Attendance: 2,832

18 May 2011	Daegu FC	2–3 (a.e.t.)	Hyundai Mipo Dockyard	Daegu Civic Stadium, Daegu
19:00 KST	Cho Hyung-ik 53'; Kim Hyun-sung 55'; Quirino (yellow card) 74' (yellow-red card) 77'		Ki Hyun-seo 22'; Alex 40'; Kim Hyo-il (yellow card) 42' (yellow-red card) 75'; Kim Jang-hyun 102'	Attendance: 812

18 May 2011	FC Seoul	4–0	Yongin City	Seoul World Cup Stadium, Seoul
19:30 KST	Choi Jong-han 57'; Damjanović 64', 83'; Adi 71'			Attendance: 3,733

18 May 2011	Gwangju FC	1–2 (a.e.t.)	Suwon City	Gwangju World Cup Stadium, Gwangju
19:00 KST	Yoo Jong-hyun 58'		Park Jong-chan 48'; Kim Han-won 96'	Attendance: 457

18 May 2011	Pohang Steelers	2–0	Daejeon KHNP	Pohang Steel Yard, Pohang
19:30 KST	Ko Mu-yeol 26'; Cho Chan-ho 82'			Attendance: 2,596

18 May 2011	Gangneung City	1–2 (a.e.t.)	Sangju Sangmu Phoenix	Gangneung Stadium, Gangneung
19:00 KST	Lee Jung-woon 13'		Kim Cheol-ho 66', 117'	Attendance: 2,000

18 May 2011	Busan Transportation Corporation	2–1	Gyeongnam FC	Busan Gudeok Stadium, Busan
19:00 KST	Jeon Jae-hee 23'; Kim Kyung-choon 87'		Han Kyung-in 67'	Attendance: 459

18 May 2011	Cheonan City	1–2	Busan IPark	Cheonan Football Center, Cheonan
19:00 KST	Hwang Ho-ryung 63'		Kim Bon-kwang 36' (o.g.); Yoon Dong-min 66'	Attendance: 1,550

18 May 2011	Chungju Hummel	0–0 (a.e.t.) (3–4 p)	Gangwon FC	Gimcheon Stadium, Gimcheon
19:00 KST				Attendance: 2,212
	Penalties
	Ryu Won-hyung (penalty scored); Lee Hae-jeong (penalty missed); Kang Doo-ho (penalty scored); Son Kook-hee (penalty scored); Lee Chun-hyun (penalty missed)		(penalty scored) Kim Young-hoo; (penalty scored) Lee Chang-hoon; (penalty scored) Kwon Soon-hyung; (penalty scored) Lee Min-kyu

18 May 2011	Goyang KB Kookmin Bank	2–4	Jeju United	Goyang Stadium, Goyang
19:00 KST	Kim Young-nam 61', 77'		Santos 54'; Park Hyun-beom 62'; Kim Eun-jung 66'; Kang Su-il 86'	Attendance: 800

18 May 2011	Gimhae City	0–3	Daejeon Citizen	Gimhae Stadium, Gimhae
19:00 KST			Park Sung-ho 13'; Han Jae-woong 59'; Kim Ba-woo 87'	Attendance: 600

18 May 2011	Incheon United	2–1	Yonsei University	Incheon Munhak Stadium, Incheon
19:00 KST	Yoo Joon-soo 5'; Lee Yun-pyo 64'		Jang Hyun-soo 74'	Attendance: 428

18 May 2011	Ansan Hallelujah	0–1	Ulsan Hyundai	Ansan Wa~ Stadium, Ansan
19:00 KST			Shin Jae-pil 65' (o.g.)	Attendance: 350

=== Round of 16 ===
The draw for the round of 16 was held on 26 May 2011.

15 June 2011	Pohang Steelers	1–0	Hyundai Mipo Dockyard	Pohang Steel Yard, Pohang
19:00 KST	Mota 25'			Attendance: 1,820

15 June 2011	Suwon City	0–1	Suwon Samsung Bluewings	Suwon Civil Stadium, Suwon
19:00 KST			Oh Jang-eun 27'	Attendance: 2,642

15 June 2011	Busan Transportation Corporation	0–1	FC Seoul	Busan Gudeok Stadium, Busan
19:00 KST			Djeparov 45'	Attendance: 1,014

15 June 2011	Incheon United	0–2	Seongnam Ilhwa Chunma	Incheon Munhak Stadium, Incheon
19:00 KST			Cho Dong-geon 47'; Éverton 66'	Attendance: 1,027

15 June 2011	Jeonbuk Hyundai Motors	1–2	Busan IPark	Jeonju World Cup Stadium, Jeonju
19:00 KST	Cho Sung-hwan 3'		Han Sang-woon 55', 64'	Attendance: 4,328

15 June 2011	Ulsan Hyundai	2–1 (a.e.t.)	Sangju Sangmu Phoenix	Ulsan Munsu Football Stadium, Ulsan
19:00 KST	Lee Ho 30'; Go Seul-ki 113'		Kim Jung-woo 23'	Attendance: 1,385

15 June 2011	Gangwon FC	1–1 (a.e.t.) (4–3 p)	Daejeon Citizen	Gangneung Stadium, Gangneung
19:00 KST	Džakmić 40'		Park Sung-ho 77'	Attendance: 3,212
	Penalties
	Lee Sang-don (penalty missed); Jang Hyuk-jin (penalty missed); Kwak Kwang-seon (penalty scored); Džakmić (penalty missed); Kwon Soon-hyung (penalty scored); Kim Jung-joo (penalty missed); Kim Jin-hwan (penalty scored); Seo Dong-hyun (penalty missed); Park Sang-jin (penalty scored)		(penalty missed) Wagner; (penalty scored) Lee Ho; (penalty missed) Hwang Jae-hun; (penalty missed) Kim Seong-jun; (penalty scored) Park Sung-ho; (penalty missed) Kim Han-seob; (penalty scored) Han Doc-hee; (penalty missed) Choi Eun-sung; (penalty missed) Kim Do-yeon

15 June 2011	Jeonnam Dragons	1–0 (a.e.t.)	Jeju United	Gwangyang Football Stadium, Gwangyang
19:00 KST	Wesley 117'		Park Jin-ok (yellow card) 59' (yellow-red card) 111'	Attendance: 2,297

=== Quarter-finals ===
The draw for the quarter-finals was held on 4 July 2011.

27 July 2011	Pohang Steelers	4–2 (a.e.t.)	FC Seoul	Pohang Steel Yard, Pohang
19:30 KST	Asamoah 31'; Mota 64'; No Byung-jun 99', 108'		Damjanović 51'; Molina 73'; Adilson (yellow card) 8' (yellow-red card) 117'	Attendance: 10,419

27 July 2011	Ulsan Hyundai	3–0	Gangwon FC	Ulsan Stadium, Ulsan
19:00 KST	Go Seul-ki 7', 30', 50'			Attendance: 1,327

27 July 2011	Suwon Samsung Bluewings	1–0	Jeonnam Dragons	Suwon World Cup Stadium, Suwon
19:30 KST	Lee Yong-rae 25'; Choi Sung-hwan (yellow card) 48' (yellow-red card) 64'			Attendance: 5,867

27 July 2011	Seongnam Ilhwa Chunma	2–1	Busan IPark	Tancheon Sports Complex, Seongnam
19:30 KST	Héverton 5'; Radončić 90'		Han Sang-woon 13' (pen.)	Attendance: 928

=== Semi-finals ===
The draw for the semi-finals was held on 4 August 2011.

24 August 2011	Seongnam Ilhwa Chunma	3–0	Pohang Steelers	Tancheon Sports Complex, Seongnam
19:30 KST	Ognenovski 39'; Cho Dong-geon 45'; Radončić 65'

24 August 2011	Suwon Samsung Bluewings	3–2 (a.e.t.)	Ulsan Hyundai	Suwon World Cup Stadium, Suwon
19:30 KST	Ristić 76'; Neretljak 82'; Park Hyun-beom 111'		Seol Ki-hyeon 58', 74'

=== Final ===
15 October 2011	Seongnam Ilhwa Chunma	1–0	Suwon Samsung Bluewings	Tancheon Sports Complex, Seongnam
14:00 KST	Cho Dong-geon 76'		Geynrikh (red card) 90+'	Attendance: 14,756

== Awards ==
=== Main awards ===
Award	Winner	Team
Most Valuable Player	(South Korea) Cho Dong-geon	Seongnam Ilhwa Chunma
Top goalscorer	(South Korea) Go Seul-ki	Ulsan Hyundai
Best Manager	(South Korea) Shin Tae-yong	Seongnam Ilhwa Chunma

=== Man of the Round ===
Round	Winner	Team
First round	(South Korea) Kim Ryun-do	Kwangwoon University
Second round	(South Korea) Lee Hoo-seon	FC Pocheon
Round of 32	(South Korea) Kim Kyung-choon	Busan Transportation Corporation
Round of 16	(South Korea) Cho Dong-geon	Seongnam Ilhwa Chunma
Quarter-finals	(South Korea) Go Seul-ki	Ulsan Hyundai
Semi-finals	(South Korea) Park Hyun-beom	Suwon Samsung Bluewings

== See also ==
- 2011 in South Korean football
- 2011 K League
- 2011 Korea National League
- 2011 Challengers League
- 2011 U-League
- 2011 Korean League Cup
