= Tae-yeon =

- Hangul: 태연
- RR: Taeyeon
- MR: T'aeyŏn

Tae-yeon is a Korean given name.

== People ==
People with this name include:

Entertainers

- Won Tae-yeon (born 1971), South Korean male film director
- Kim Tae-yeon (actress) (born 1976), South Korean actress
- Kim Tae-yeon (born 1989), South Korean female singer, member of girl group Girls' Generation

Sportspeople

- Ha Tae-yeon (born 1976), South Korean male wrestler
- Jin Taiyan (born 1989), Chinese male footballer of Korean descent
- Kim Tae-yeon (footballer) (born 1988), South Korean male footballer

Others

- Kim Tae-yeon (painter) (born 1986), South Korean female painter

Fictional characters with this name include:

- Kim Tae-yeon, female character in 2005 South Korean film Cello
- Min Tae-yeon, male character in 2011 South Korean television series Vampire Prosecutor

== See also ==
- List of Korean given names
- Taeyang (disambiguation)
