= Kim Tae-yeon (disambiguation) =

Kim Tae-yeon (born 1989), also known as Taeyeon, is a South Korean singer.

Kim Tae-yeon may also refer to:

- Kim Tae-yeon (actress) (born 1976), South Korean model and actress
- Kim Tae-yeon (painter) (born 1986), South Korean painter
- Kim Tae-yeon (footballer) (born 1988), South Korean football midfielder

== See also ==
- Kim Tae-yun (disambiguation)
