= Kim Do-yeon =

- Hangul: 김도연
- RR: Gim Doyeon
- MR: Kim Toyŏn

Kim Do-yeon (Korean: 김도연) is a Korean name consisting of the family name Kim and the given name Do-yeon, and may also refer to:

- Kim Do-yeon (politician) (1894–1967), Korean politician
- Kim Do-yeon (footballer, born 1988), South Korean female footballer
- Kim Do-yeon (footballer, born 1989), South Korean male footballer; see 2011 Daejeon Citizen FC season
- Kim Do-yeon (footballer, born 2008), South Korean male footballer
- Kim Do-yeon (singer) (born 1999), South Korean singer
- Kim Do-yeon (actress) (born 1978), South Korean actress
