= Park Sang-wook =

Park Sang-wook may refer to:

- Park Sang-wook (actor)
- Park Sang-wook (footballer)
