= Lee Sang-hee =

Lee Sang-hee (Korean: 이상희) is a Korean name consisting of the family name Lee and the given name Sang-hee. It may refer to:

- Lee Sang-hee (general) (1945–2026), South Korean general
- Lee Sang-hee (footballer) (born 1988)
- Lee Sang-hee (actress) (born 1983)
