= Han Deok-hee =

South Korean footballer (born 1987)

Han Deok-Hee
Personal information
- Full name: Han Deok-Hee
- Date of birth: 20 February 1987 (age 39)
- Place of birth: Cheonan, South Korea
- Height: 1.72 m (5 ft 7 1/2 in)
- Position: Midfielder

Youth career
- Ajou University

Senior career*
Years	Team	Apps	(Gls)
2009–2010	Incheon United	0	(0)
2011–2013	Daejeon Citizen	52	(1)
2014–2015	→ Ansan Police (army)	31	(0)
- * Club domestic league appearances and goals as of 15 December 2015

Han Deok-Hee (Korean: 한덕희; born 20 February 1987) is a South Korean former football player who played for Daejeon Citizen as a midfielder.

== Club career ==
Han was selected by Incheon United as one of their draft players for the 2009 K-League season. Without having played at senior level for Incheon, Han transferred to Daejeon Citizen for the 2011 season. Han's professional debut was against Seongnam Ilhwa Chunma in a 2011 K-League Cup group match on 20 April 2011, earning a yellow card within minutes of starting the match. Han then made his league debut on 29 May 2011, against Jeonbuk Motors. Han began to feature regularly in Daejeon's starting line-up in the league, and scored his first professional goal against the Chunnam Dragons on 2 July 2011.

== Club career statistics ==
As of 6 March 2015

Club performance			League		Cup		League Cup		Total	
Season	Club	League	Apps	Goals	Apps	Goals	Apps	Goals	Apps	Goals
South Korea			League		KFA Cup		League Cup		Total	
2009	Incheon United	K-League	0	0	0	0	0	0	0	0
2010	Incheon United	K-League	0	0	0	0	0	0	0	0
2011	Daejeon Citizen	K-League	14	1	2	0	2	0	18	1
2012	Daejeon Citizen	K-League	14	0	1	0	-		15	0
2013	Daejeon Citizen	K-League Classic	20	0	0	0	-		20	0
2014	Ansan Police	K League Challenge	8	0	0	0	-		8	0
Career total			56	1	3	0	2	0	61	1

Sporting positions
Preceded by Kim Tae-yeon	Daejeon Citizen captain 2013	Succeeded by Yoon Won-il
