= 太陽 =

太陽 or 태양, meaning 'sun', may refer to:

- Immortal, Taiwanese singer Cheer Chen's album
- The Sun, 2001 American singer Christine Fan's album
- Taeyang (born 1988), a South Korean singer
- Taiyō (disambiguation), a masculine Japanese given name
- Takashi, a given name for Japanese actor and vocalist Takashi Matsuo (born 1996)

== See also ==
- Immortal (disambiguation)
- Sun (disambiguation)
- Taeyang (disambiguation)
- Taiyang (disambiguation)
