= 2008 U-League =

U-League
- Season: 2008
- Dates: 1 May – 3 November 2008
- Champions: Kyung Hee University (1st title)
- Matches played: 90
- Goals scored: 215 (2.39 per match)
- Best Player: Lee Ho
- Top goalscorer: Ko Kyung-min (9 goals)
- Best goalkeeper: Jeong Seong-yoon

The 2008 U-League was the first football season of the U-League.

== League table ==
Pos	Team	Pld	W	D	L	GF	GA	GD	Pts
1	Kyung Hee University (C)	18	8	8	2	25	14	+11	32
2	Hanyang University	18	7	9	2	30	21	+9	30
3	Chung-Ang University	18	8	6	4	29	21	+8	30
4	Konkuk University	18	4	12	2	18	15	+3	24
5	Yonsei University	18	6	6	6	24	27	−3	24
6	Kwangwoon University	18	6	4	8	22	22	0	22
7	Korea University	18	4	9	5	19	21	−2	21
8	Myongji University	18	5	4	9	15	24	−9	19
9	University of Suwon	18	4	6	8	18	26	−8	18
10	Sungkyunkwan University	18	2	8	8	15	24	−9	14

Source: Korea Football Association (in Korean)
Rules for classification: 1) Points; 2) Goal difference; 3) Goals scored.
(C) Champions

== Results ==
Home \ Away	CAU	HYU	KKU	KRU	KWU	KHU	MJU	SKK	USW	YSU
Chung-Ang University	—	1–2	1–1	1–0	1–0	2–3	4–0	1–1	2–1	2–3
Hanyang University	1–1	—	0–0	1–1	5–1	2–1	2–1	1–1	1–0	3–4
Konkuk University	3–3	1–1	—	3–2	0–0	0–0	0–0	1–0	1–2	1–0
Korea University	1–1	1–1	1–1	—	0–2	1–1	1–1	3–0	1–0	2–2
Kwangwoon University	1–1	2–4	0–2	0–0	—	0–1	2–1	2–2	4–0	3–0
Kyung Hee University	1–0	1–1	1–1	5–0	1–0	—	2–1	0–0	3–1	3–3
Myongji University	0–2	3–2	0–0	0–3	1–0	1–2	—	1–0	0–0	0–1
Sungkyunkwan University	1–2	0–1	2–2	1–1	0–1	0–0	1–3	—	1–1	3–2
University of Suwon	2–3	1–1	0–0	0–1	3–2	1–0	0–1	2–1	—	3–3
Yonsei University	0–1	1–1	1–0	1–0	0–2	0–0	2–1	0–1	1–1	—

Source: Korea Football Association (in Korean)
Legend: Blue = home team win; Yellow = draw; Red = away team win.

== Awards ==
Award	Winner	University
Most Valuable Player	Lee Ho	Kyung Hee University
Valuable Player	Ahn Joon-hyeok	Hanyang University
Top goalscorer	Ko Kyung-min	Hanyang University
Best Defender	Park Sang-jin	Kyung Hee University
Best Goalkeeper	Jeong Seong-yoon	Kyung Hee University
Fair Play Player	Jeong Wu-seong	Chung-Ang University
Best Manager	Kim Kwang-jin	Kyung Hee University
Fair Play Team	Hanyang University	

== See also ==
- 2008 in South Korean football
- 2008 Korean FA Cup
