= Taeyang (disambiguation) =

Taeyang (Korean for "sun") is a South Korean singer.

Taeyang may also refer to:

- Taeyang ("sun, Great Yang") in Traditional Korean medicine
- TaeYang, doll 2003
- Taeyangcho gochujang, Sun chilli paste

== See also ==
- Tae-yeon (name)
- 太陽 (disambiguation)
