= Yoon Won-il (footballer, born 1986) =

South Korean footballer

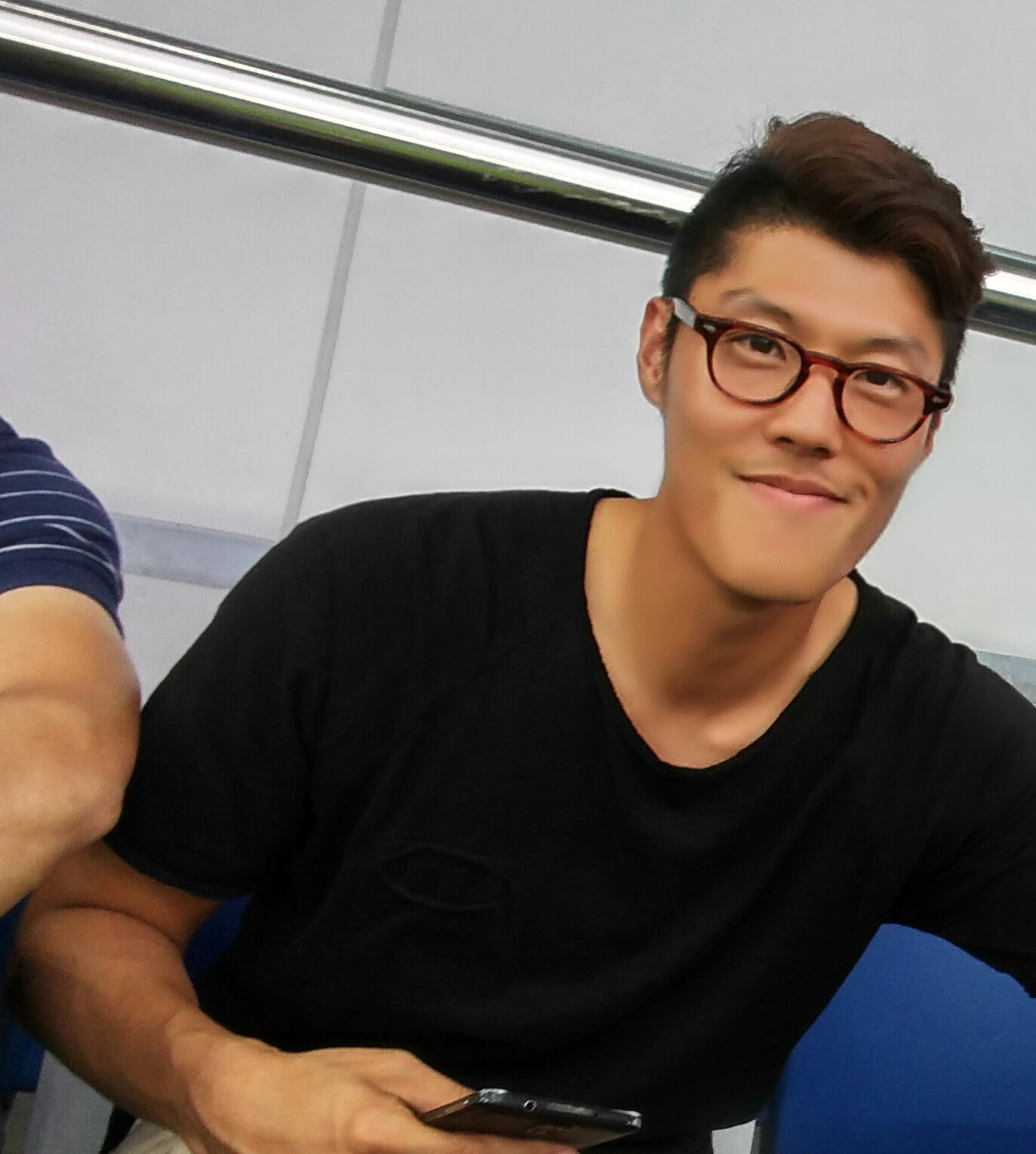

Personal information
- Date of birth: October 23, 1986 (age 40)
- Place of birth: South Korea
- Height: 1.82 m (5 ft 11 1/2 in)
- Position: Defender

Team information
- Current team: Daejeon Citizen
- Number: 33

Youth career
- Masan Technical High School

Senior career*
Years	Team	Apps	(Gls)
2008–2013	Jeju United	12	(0)
2013	→ Daejeon Citizen (loan)	20	(1)
2014–	Daejeon Citizen	30	(0)

International career
2008	South Korea U-23	1	(0)
- * Club domestic league appearances and goals as of 15 December 2015

Yoon Won-il (Korean: 윤원일; born October 23, 1986) is a South Korean football player who currently plays for Daejeon Citizen in the K League Challenge.

Sporting positions
Preceded by Han Deok-hee	Daejeon Citizen captain 2014-2015	Succeeded by An Sang-hyun
