= Kim Ju-hyoung =

South Korean footballer (born 1989)

Personal information
- Date of birth: August 23, 1989 (age 37)
- Place of birth: South Korea
- Height: 1.87 m (6 ft 1 1/2 in)
- Position: Forward

Youth career
- Dong-eui University

Senior career*
Years	Team	Apps	(Gls)
2010–2011	Daejeon Citizen	3	(0)
2012	Suwon City	0	(0)
2014	Chungju Hummel	0	(0)
Korean name
Hangul	김주형
RR	Gim Juhyeong
MR	Kim Chuhyŏng
- * Club domestic league appearances and goals as of 8 January 2014

Kim Ju-hyoung (Korean: 김주형; born August 23, 1989) is a South Korean football player, who played as a forward for Chungju Hummel.

== Club career ==
Kim joined Daejeon Citizen in 2010 as one of the club's draft picks. His first league appearance was on 28 August 2010, as a late substitute in Daejeon's home loss to Jeju United. He remained with Daejeon for 2011 but had limited chances during the season, with his sole league appearance being in the heavy loss to the Pohang Steelers on 9 July 2011. Before the 2012 K-League campaign, Daejeon declined to extend his contract.

== Club career statistics ==
As of 8 January 2014

Club performance			League		Cup		League Cup		Total	
Season	Club	League	Apps	Goals	Apps	Goals	Apps	Goals	Apps	Goals
South Korea			League		KFA Cup		League Cup		Total	
2010	Daejeon Citizen	K-League	2	0	0	0	0	0	2	0
2011	Daejeon Citizen	K-League	1	0	1	0	1	0	3	0
2012	Suwon City	Korea National League	0	0	0	0	-		0	0
Career total			3	0	1	0	1	0	5	0
