= Park Jin-ok =

South Korean footballer

Park Jin-Ok
Personal information
- Full name: Park Jin-Ok
- Date of birth: 28 May 1982 (age 44)
- Place of birth: South Korea
- Height: 1.70 m (5 ft 7 in)
- Position: Midfielder

Team information
- Current team: Gwangju FC
- Number: 19

Youth career
- Kyung Hee University

Senior career*
Years	Team	Apps	(Gls)
2005–2012	Bucheon SK / Jeju United	103	(1)
2009–2010	→ Gwangju Sangmu (military service)	21	(0)
2013	Daejeon Citizen	30	(0)
2014–	Gwangju FC	8	(0)
- * Club domestic league appearances and goals as of 23 November 2014

Park Jin-Ok (born 28 May 1982) is a South Korean football player who plays for Gwangju FC in the K League Challenge.

Sporting positions
Preceded by Lee Ho	Daejeon Citizen captain 2013	Succeeded by Kim Tae-yeon
