= Kim Tae-yun =

- Hangul: 김태윤
- RR: Gim Taeyun
- MR: Kim T'aeyun

Kim Tae-yun (Korean: 김태윤) or Kim Tae-yoon is a Korean name consisting of the family name Kim and the given name Tae-yun, and may also refer to:

- Kim Tae-yoon (footballer) (born 1986), South Korean footballer
- Kim Tae-yoon (archer) (born 1993), South Korean archer, holder of an Asian Games record in archery
- Kim Tae-yun (speed skater) (born 1994), South Korean speed skater
- Kim Tae-yoon (film and television director), director of Mr. Zoo: The Missing VIP and Tomorrow

== See also ==
- Kim Tae-yeon (disambiguation) (김태연)
