= Park Jung-hae =

South Korean footballer (born 1987)

Park Jung-Hae
Personal information
- Date of birth: 21 April 1987 (age 39)
- Place of birth: Busan, South Korea
- Height: 1.83 m (6 ft 0 in)
- Position: Defender

Youth career
- Soongsil University

Senior career*
Years	Team	Apps	(Gls)
2008	Sagan Tosu	6	(0)
2009–2011	Daejeon Citizen	55	(2)
Total		61	(2)

International career
2005–2007	South Korea U-20	20	(0)
- * Club domestic league appearances and goals

- Park Jung-hae
- Hangul: 박정혜
- Hanja: 朴炡慧
- RR: Bak Jeonghye
- MR: Pak Chŏnghye

Park Jung-Hae (Korean: 박정혜; born 21 April 1987) is a South Korean former footballer who played as a defender. He played for Sagan Tosu in the J2 League. He was expelled from K-League after being implicated in the match-fixing scandal.

== Career statistics ==
Appearances and goals by club, season and competition
Club	Season	League			National cup (Note: Includes Emperor's Cup, Korean FA Cup.)		League cup (Note: Includes J.League Cup, K-League Cup.)		Total	
Club	Season	Division	Apps	Goals	Apps	Goals	Apps	Goals	Apps	Goals
Sagan Tosu	2008	J2 League	6	0	0	0	-		6	0
Daejeon Citizen	2009	K-League	23	1	4	0	4	0	31	1
Daejeon Citizen	2010	K-League	22	1	1	0	1	0	24	1
Daejeon Citizen	2011	K-League	10	0	0	0	0	0	10	0
Daejeon Citizen	Total		55	2	5	0	5	0	65	2
Career total			61	1	5	0	5	0	71	2
