= Park Kun-young =

South Korean footballer

Park Kun-Young
Personal information
- Date of birth: 14 March 1987 (age 39)
- Place of birth: South Korea
- Height: 1.91 m (6 ft 3 in)
- Position: Defender

Youth career
- Yeungnam University

Senior career*
Years	Team	Apps	(Gls)
2011—2012	Daejeon Citizen	7	(0)
- * Club domestic league appearances and goals as of 6 March 2015

Park Kun-Young (Korean: 박건영; born 14 March 1987) is a South Korean football player who formerly played for Daejeon Citizen as a defender.

== Club career ==
Park was selected by Daejeon Citizen as a draft player for the 2011 K-League season. Park earned a yellow card on his professional debut, in Daejeon's loss in Gyeongnam FC in a 2011 K-League Cup group match. Park made his league debut the following week, against Daegu FC.

== Club career statistics ==
As of 6 March 2015

Club performance			League		Cup		League Cup		Total	
Season	Club	League	Apps	Goals	Apps	Goals	Apps	Goals	Apps	Goals
South Korea			League		KFA Cup		League Cup		Total	
2011	Daejeon Citizen	K-League	7	0	1	0	2	0	10	0
2012	Daejeon Citizen	K-League	0	0	0	0	-		0	0
Career total			7	0	1	0	2	0	10	0
