= Bai Zijian =

Chinese footballer (born 1992)

Bai Zijian 白子健
Personal information
- Full name: Bai Zijian
- Date of birth: 16 October 1992 (age 34)
- Place of birth: Shenyang, Liaoning, China
- Height: 1.75 m (5 ft 9 in)
- Position: Left winger

Team information
- Current team: Jiangxi Lushan
- Number: 11

Youth career
- 2009: Shenyang Dongjin

Senior career*
Years	Team	Apps	(Gls)
2010	Chongqing Lifan	0	(0)
2011	Daejeon Citizen	9	(0)
2012	Goyang KB	0	(0)
2013	Changchun Yatai	0	(0)
2016–2017	Shenyang Dongjin	37	(2)
2018–2021	Heilongjiang Ice City	44	(1)
2022	Zibo Cuju	17	(3)
2023–2024	Liaoning Shenyang Urban	18	(0)
2025–	Jiangxi Lushan	0	(0)
- * Club domestic league appearances and goals as of 24 December 2023

Bai Zijian (Chinese: 白子健; pinyin: Bái Zijiàn; born 16 October 1992) is a Chinese footballer who plays for Jiangxi Lushan in the China League Two.

== Club career ==
Bai Zijian is an ethnic Korean-Chinese who predominantly concentrated on his studies before moving into football where with the help of a family friend and former professional footballer Wang Chao, he was able to enroll with second-tier football club Shenyang Dongjin's youth team. Very little came from his period with Shenyang, however he would be scouted by the Chongqing Lifan manager Li Shubin who was impressed by Bai and would sign him as a youth player. Despite joining a top tier football club and being promoted to the first squad, Bai actually saw no playing time throughout the entire 2010 season. Often spending most of the season as a translator for teammate Cho Se-Kwon, Bai's time at the club was cut short when Li Shubin was sacked due to a poor run of results and Bai was surplus to requirements at the end of the season.

Almost giving up on football and returning to his education, Bai was persuaded to go to a training session held in Guangzhou for K-League side Daejeon Citizen and impressed the team's manager Wang Sun-Jae who would sign the player on 14 February 2011 after a successful trial. He made his debut for the club on 6 March 2011 in a league match against Ulsan Hyundai, coming on as a substitute in the 90th minute in a 2-1 victory. After a one-year stint, Daejeon made a decision to not extend his contract. He then joined South Korean second division club Goyang KB in February 2012 and received little playing time at the club throughout the season.

Bai left Goyang KB to join Chinese Super League club Changchun Yatai for the 2013 season. He made his league debut on 5 October 2013 against Guangzhou R&F in a 1-0 away defeat.

Bai joined China League One newcomer Heilongjiang Lava Spring on 28 February 2018.

== Career statistics ==
Statistics accurate as of match played 31 December 2023.

Appearances and goals by club, season and competition
Club	Season	League			National Cup		League Cup		Other		Total	
Club	Season	Division	Apps	Goals	Apps	Goals	Apps	Goals	Apps	Goals	Apps	Goals
Chongqing Lifan	2010	Chinese Super League	0	0	0	0	-		-		0	0
Daejeon Citizen	2011	K-League	9	0	0	0	5 (Note: Appearances in Korean League Cup)	0	-		14	0
Goyang KB	2012	Korea National League	5	0	0	0	0 (Note: Appearances in Korea National League Championship)	0	-		5	0
Changchun Yatai	2013	Chinese Super League	1	0	0	0	-		-		1	0
Shenyang Dongjin	2016	China League Two	16	2	1	0	-		-		17	2
Shenyang Dongjin	2017	China League Two	22	0	0	0	-		-		22	0
Shenyang Dongjin	Total		38	2	1	0	0	0	0	0	39	2
Heilongjiang Lava Spring	2018	China League One	13	1	0	0	-		-		13	1
Heilongjiang Lava Spring	2019	China League One	7	0	0	0	-		-		7	0
Heilongjiang Lava Spring	2020	China League One	11	0	-		-		0 (Note: Appearances in China League One relegation play-offs)	0	11	0
Heilongjiang Lava Spring	2021	China League One	13	0	1	2	-		-		14	2
Heilongjiang Lava Spring	Total		44	1	1	2	0	0	0	0	45	3
Zibo Cuju	2022	China League One	17	3	1	0	-		-		18	3
Liaoning Shenyang Urban/ Liaoning Tieren	2023	China League One	17	0	0	0	-		-		17	0
Career total			131	6	3	2	5	0	0	0	139	8
