= Go Dae-woo =

South Korean footballer

Personal information
- Date of birth: 9 February 1987 (age 39)
- Place of birth: Busan, South Korea
- Height: 1.68 m (5 ft 6 in)
- Position: Midfielder

Youth career
- 2002–2004: Juyeop Technical High School
- 2006–2009: Pai Chai University

Senior career*
Years	Team	Apps	(Gls)
2010–2012	Daejeon Citizen	7	(0)
2013	Paju Citizen	14	(6)
2014	FC Anyang	0	(0)
- * Club domestic league appearances and goals as of 24 November 2014

- Go Dae-woo
- Hangul: 고대우
- Hanja: 高大佑
- RR: Go Daeu
- MR: Ko Taeu

Go Dae-woo (Korean: 고대우; born 9 February 1987) is a South Korean footballer who plays as a midfielder.
