= Kwak Chang-hee =

South Korean footballer

Kwak Chang-Hee
Personal information
- Full name: Kwak Chang-Hee
- Date of birth: July 26, 1987 (age 39)
- Place of birth: Gwangju, South Korea
- Height: 1.81 m (5 ft 11 1/2 in)
- Position: Striker

Youth career
- 2006–2009: Chosun University

Senior career*
Years	Team	Apps	(Gls)
2010–2011	Daejeon Citizen	20	(2)
- * Club domestic league appearances and goals as of 17 June 2011

Kwak Chang-Hee (born July 26, 1987) is a former South Korean football player.

On 17 June 2011, his football career was rescinded by the Korea Professional Football League with other accomplices.
