= Hwang Jin-san =

South Korean footballer (born 1989)

Hwang Jin-San
Personal information
- Full name: Hwang Jin-San
- Date of birth: February 25, 1989 (age 37)
- Place of birth: Jinju, South Korea
- Height: 1.77 m (5 ft 9 1/2 in)
- Position: Midfielder

Team information
- Current team: Hwaseong FC

Senior career*
Years	Team	Apps	(Gls)
2008–2009	Ulsan Hyundai	0	(0)
2009–2014	Daejeon Citizen	95	(4)
2015–2016	FC Pocheon		
2017	Gimhae FC	13	(0)
2018	Bucheon FC 1995	13	(0)
2019-2020	Changwon City FC	28	(1)
2020-	Hwaseong FC	45	(2)
- * Club domestic league appearances and goals as of 22 October 2022

Hwang Jin-San (Korean: 황진산; born February 25, 1989) is a South Korean football player for Hwaseong FC in K3 League.
