= Taiyō =

Taiyō is the romanization for some Japanese words, such as 太陽 for sun and 大洋 for ocean. It can also refer to:

== Persons ==
A male Japanese given name

- Taiyo Hama (濱 大耀; born 1998), Japanese footballer
- Taiyō Kea (born 1975), American professional wrestler
- Taiyo Nonomura (野々村太陽; born 2001), Japanese speed-skater
- Taiyo Shimokawa (下川 太陽; born 2002), Japanese footballer
- Natsuki Taiyo (夏樹 たいよう; born 1984), Japanese professional wrestler
- Taiyo Strauss-Vanderpool (born 2011), Jewish American philosopher and composer
- Taiyo Hamster

== Organisations ==
- Taiyō (magazine), a Japanese magazine
- Taiyo Pharmaceutical Industry, a pharmaceutical product manufacturing company located in Takayama, Gifu, Japan, now part of Teva Pharmaceuticals
- Taiyō Whales, one of the previous names of the Yokohama BayStars
- Maruha Nichiro, a Japanese seafood company once known as Taiyo
- Taiyo Yuden, a manufacturer of electronic components
- Taiyo Department Store, a now-defunct department store in Kumamoto, Kumamoto famous for a 1973 fire

== Other ==
- Japanese aircraft carrier Taiyō, the first of the Taiyō class escort aircraft carriers
- Taiyo (Locomía album), 1989
- Taiyo (Chisato Moritaka album), 1996
- "Taiyō" (song), the first single by Japanese band GO!GO!7188
- Taiyō, a sunflower variety
- Taiyo (satellite), a Japanese satellite launched in 1975 to study thermosphere and sun
