= Do-yeon =

- Hangul: 도연
- RR: Doyeon
- MR: Toyŏn

Do-yeon is a Korean given name.

People with this name include:

- Hwang Do-yeon (born 1991), South Korean football player
- Jang Do-yeon (born 1985), South Korean comedian
- Jeon Do-yeon (born 1973), South Korean actress
- Kim Do-yeon (politician) (1894–1967), Korean independence activist and politician
- Kim Do-yeon (actress) (born 1978), South Korean actress
- Kim Do-yeon (footballer) (born 1988), South Korean female footballer
- Kim Do-yeon (singer) (born 1999), South Korean singer and actress

Fictional characters with this name include:

- Seo Do-yeon, in 2013 South Korean television series I Can Hear Your Voice

== See also ==
- List of Korean given names
