= Park Sung-ho (footballer) =

South Korean footballer (born 1982)

Personal information
- Full name: Park Sung-ho
- Date of birth: 17 July 1982 (age 44)
- Place of birth: Incheon, South Korea
- Height: 1.93 m (6 ft 4 in)
- Position: Forward

Youth career
- 1998–2000: Bupyeong High School

Senior career*
Years	Team	Apps	(Gls)
2001–2005	Anyang LG Cheetahs / FC Seoul	3	(0)
2004–2005	→ Police (military service)	0	(0)
2006–2007	Busan IPark	38	(7)
2008–2011	Daejeon Citizen	88	(24)
2010	→ Vegalta Sendai (loan)	9	(1)
2012–2013	Pohang Steelers	71	(17)
2014	Yokohama FC	31	(3)
2015	Pohang Steelers	26	(3)
2016	Ulsan Hyundai	8	(1)
2017	Seongnam FC	31	(9)
- * Club domestic league appearances and goals as of 5 January 2018

- Park Sung-ho
- Hangul: 박성호
- Hanja: 朴成鎬
- RR: Bak Seongho
- MR: Pak Sŏngho

Park Sung-ho (Korean: 박성호; born 17 July 1982) is a South Korean football forward. His previous clubs were Anyang LG Cheetahs, Busan IPark, Daejeon Citizen, Pohang Steelers, Ulsan Hyundai and J1 League side Vegalta Sendai.

On 3 November 2011, he was traded with Kim Dong-hee and Lee Seul-gi of Pohang Steelers.

After a year in Ulsan, Seongnam FC announced him as a new signing on 12th Feb 2017.

== Club statistics ==
As of 31 October 2011

Club performance			League		Cup		League Cup		Continental		Total	
Season	Club	League	Apps	Goals	Apps	Goals	Apps	Goals	Apps	Goals	Apps	Goals
Korea Republic			League		FA Cup		League Cup		Asia		Total	
2001	Anyang LG Cheetahs	K League 1	1	0	0	0	4	0	-		5	0
2002	Anyang LG Cheetahs	K League 1	0	0	0	0	0	0	-		0	0
2003	Anyang LG Cheetahs	K League 1	2	0	0	0	0	0	-		2	0
2006	Busan IPark	K League 1	15	2	0	0	12	0	-		27	2
2007	Busan IPark	K League 1	23	5	3	0	10	0	-		36	5
2008	Daejeon Citizen	K League 1	24	5	0	0	7	2	-		31	7
2009	Daejeon Citizen	K League 1	28	9	3	0	3	1	-		34	10
2010	Daejeon Citizen	K League 1	11	3	0	0	4	3	-		15	6
Japan			League		Emperor's Cup		J.League Cup		Asia		Total	
2010	Vegalta Sendai	J1 League	9	1	1	0	2	0	-		12	1
Korea Republic			League		FA Cup		League Cup		Asia		Total	
2011	Daejeon Citizen	K League 1	28	8	2	2	1	0	-		31	10
Country	Korea Republic		132	32	8	2	41	6	-		181	40
Country	Japan		9	1	1	0	2	0	-		12	1
Total			141	33	9	2	43	6	-		193	41

Sporting positions
Preceded by Hwang Ji-yoon	Daejeon Citizen captain 2011	Succeeded by Lee Ho
