= Yang Jung-min =

South Korean footballer

Personal information
- Full name: Yang Jung-min
- Date of birth: 21 May 1986 (age 40)
- Place of birth: South Korea
- Height: 1.85 m (6 ft 1 in)
- Position: Defender

Youth career
- Pukyong National University

Senior career*
Years	Team	Apps	(Gls)
2009–2011	Daejeon Citizen	41	(0)
- * Club domestic league appearances and goals as of 17 June 2011

Yang Jung-min (Korean: 양정민; born 21 May 1986) is a South Korean football defender.

He was arrested on the charge connected with the match fixing allegations on 29 May 2011. On 17 June 2011, his football career was rescinded by the Korea Professional Football League with other accomplices.
