= Lee Sang-hee (footballer) =

South Korean footballer

Lee Sang-Hee
Personal information
- Full name: Lee Sang-Hee
- Date of birth: 18 May 1988 (age 38)
- Place of birth: South Korea
- Height: 1.87 m (6 ft 1 1/2 in)
- Position: Defender

Team information
- Current team: Songwol FC

Youth career
- 2007–2010: Hongik University

Senior career*
Years	Team	Apps	(Gls)
2011	Daejeon Citizen	3	(0)
2012–2013	→ Sangju Sangmu Phoenix (army)	?	(?)
2014	Incheon United FC	0	(0)
2016–	Songwol FC	0	(0)
- * Club domestic league appearances and goals as of 1 May 2021

Lee Sang-Hee (Korean: 이상희; born 18 July 1988) is a South Korean football defender for Songwol FC.

== Club career ==
Lee, a draftee from the 2011 K-League draft intake, was selected by Daejeon Citizen for the 2011 season. He marked his first appearance for Daejeon Citizen with a yellow card in the club's loss in the third group match of the K-League Cup, against Seongnam Ilhwa Chunma. Lee's debut in the K-League itself was in round 10, on 14 May, and he promptly earned the ire of the referee when he collected a red card for a foul late in the first half. With his side reduced to 10 men, Lee had to watch from the sidelines as the Chunnam Dragons scored two goals in the second half to come out winners.

== Club career statistics ==
As of 1 January 2013

Club performance			League		Cup		League Cup		Total	
Season	Club	League	Apps	Goals	Apps	Goals	Apps	Goals	Apps	Goals
South Korea			League		KFA Cup		League Cup		Total	
2011	Daejeon Citizen	K-League	3	0	0	0	3	0	6	0
2012	Sangju Sangmu FC	K-League	?	?	?	?	-		?	?
2013	Sangju Sangmu FC	K League Challenge	?	?	0	0	-		?	?
Career total			3	0	0	0	3	0	6	0
