= Sin Jun-bae =

South Korean footballer

Sin Jun-Bae
Personal information
- Full name: Sin Jun-Bae
- Date of birth: 26 October 1985 (age 41)
- Place of birth: Gwangju, South Korea
- Height: 1.84 m (6 ft 1/2 in)
- Position: Goalkeeper

Youth career
- 2005–2008: Sun Moon University

Senior career*
Years	Team	Apps	(Gls)
2009–2011	Daejeon Citizen	11	(0)
- * Club domestic league appearances and goals as of 17 June 2011

- Sin Jun-bae
- Hangul: 신준배
- Hanja: 辛俊培
- RR: Sin Junbae
- MR: Sin Chunbae

Sin Jun-Bae (Korean: 신준배; born 26 October 1985) is a South Korean former footballer who played as goalkeeper.

He was arrested on the charge connected with the match fixing allegations on 29 May 2011. On 17 June 2011, his football career was rescinded by the Korea Professional Football League with other accomplices.
