= Hwang Jae-hun (footballer, born 1986) =

South Korean footballer

Hwang Jae-Hun
Personal information
- Full name: Hwang Jae-Hun
- Date of birth: 10 March 1986 (age 40)
- Place of birth: South Korea
- Height: 1.85 m (6 ft 1 in)
- Position: Defender

Team information
- Current team: Busan IPark
- Number: 13

Youth career
- 2005–2008: Konkuk University

Senior career*
Years	Team	Apps	(Gls)
2009–2010	Pohang Steelers	1	(0)
2011	Daejeon Citizen	14	(1)
2011–	Busan I'Park	21	(0)
- * Club domestic league appearances and goals as of 2 December 2014

- Hwang Jae-hun
- Hangul: 황재훈
- Hanja: 黃載訓
- RR: Hwang Jaehun
- MR: Hwang Chaehun

Hwang Jae-hun (Korean: 황재훈; born 10 March 1986) is a South Korean footballer who plays as a central defender for Busan IPark in the K League Classic.

== Club career ==
Hwang was one of the Pohang Steelers draft picks for the 2009 K-League season. Hwang only appeared once for the Steelers during 2009 and 2010, this being a league match against FC Seoul on 27 March 2010.

Hwang moved to Daejeon Citizen for the 2011 season and made a number of appearances for his new club, despite conceding an own goal in only his second game for the club. Hwang recompensed for his error in the following match, scoring his first professional goal in a 2 - 0 win over Gyeongnam FC. Despite being one of the first choice defenders for Daejeon, Hwang transferred during the summer to Busan I'Park.

== Club career statistics ==
As of 2 December 2014

Club performance			League		Cup		League Cup		Continental		Total	
Season	Club	League	Apps	Goals	Apps	Goals	Apps	Goals	Apps	Goals	Apps	Goals
Korea Republic			League		FA Cup		K-League Cup		Asia		Total	
2009	Pohang Steelers	K-League	0	0	0	0	0	0	0	0	0	0
2010	Pohang Steelers	K-League	1	0	0	0	0	0	0	0	1	0
2011	Daejeon Citizen	K-League	14	1	2	0	0	0	-		16	1
2011	Busan I'Park	K-League	11	0	0	0	0	0	-		11	0
2012	Busan I'Park	K-League	0	0	0	0	-		-		0	0
2013	Busan I'Park	KL Classic	5	0	0	0	-	-	-	-	5	0
2014	Busan I'Park	KL Classic	5	0	0	0	-	-	-	-	5	0
Career total			36	1	2	0	0	0	0	0	38	1
