= Kim Jin-sol (footballer) =

South Korean footballer (born 1989)

Kim Jin-Sol
Personal information
- Date of birth: 11 January 1989 (age 37)
- Place of birth: Gimhae, South Korea
- Height: 1.88 m (6 ft 2 in)
- Position: Forward

Team information
- Current team: Cheonan City
- Number: 18

Youth career
- 2007–2009: Woosuk University

Senior career*
Years	Team	Apps	(Gls)
2010–2011	Daejeon Citizen	6	(0)
2012–	Cheonan City		
- * Club domestic league appearances and goals as of 31 October 2011

- Kim Jin-sol
- Hangul: 김진솔
- Hanja: 金眞率
- RR: Gim Jinsol
- MR: Kim Chinsol

Kim Jin-Sol (Korean: 김진솔; born 11 January 1989) is a South Korean footballer who plays for Cheonan City FC as a forward.

He last played for Daejeon Citizen in the K-League.
