= Lee Hyun-woong =

South Korean footballer

Lee Hyun-Woong
Personal information
- Full name: Lee Hyun-Woong
- Date of birth: April 27, 1988 (age 38)
- Place of birth: South Korea
- Height: 1.75 m (5 ft 9 in)
- Position: Midfielder

Team information
- Current team: Gyeongnam FC
- Number: 14

Youth career
- 2007–2009: Yonsei University

Senior career*
Years	Team	Apps	(Gls)
2010–2012	Daejeon Citizen	65	(1)
2013–2016	Suwon Samsung Bluewings	3	(0)
2014	→ Sangju Sangmu (army)	6	(0)
2016	Super Power Samut Prakan	9	(1)
2017–2018	Gyeongnam FC	1	(0)
2017	→ FC Anyang (loan)	1	(0)

International career
- South Korea U-17
- * Club domestic league appearances and goals as of 8 December 2018

Lee Hyun-Woong (born April 27, 1988) is a South Korean football player who plays for Gyeongnam FC.
