= Kim Sung-joon (footballer) =

South Korean footballer (born 1988)

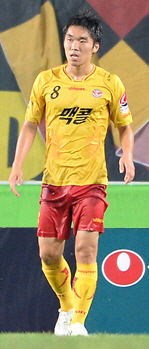

Personal information
- Full name: Kim Sung-joon
- Date of birth: 8 April 1988 (age 38)
- Place of birth: Jinju, South Korea
- Height: 1.74 m (5 ft 9 in)
- Position: Midfielder

Team information
- Current team: Gimpo
- Number: 16

Youth career
- Hongik University

Senior career*
Years	Team	Apps	(Gls)
2009–2012	Daejeon Citizen	63	(4)
2012–2017	Seongnam FC	99	(10)
2014	→ Cerezo Osaka (loan)	17	(0)
2016–2017	→ Sangju Sangmu (army)	55	(4)
2018	FC Seoul	11	(1)
2019–2023	Ulsan Hyundai	16	(0)
2024–2025	Cheonan City	53	(7)
2026–	Gimpo	16	(1)

International career^{‡}
2004	South Korea U17	1	(0)
2007	South Korea U20	4	(0)
2014–	South Korea	3	(0)
- * Club domestic league appearances and goals as of 6 August 2026 ‡ National team caps and goals as of 3 February 2018

Kim Sung-joon (Korean: 김성준; Hanja: 金聖埈; born 8 April 1988) is a South Korean football player who plays for Gimpo as a midfielder.

== Career statistics ==
=== Club ===
As of 15 July 2018

Appearances and goals by club, season and competition
Club performance			League		League cup		National cup		Continental		Total	
Season	Club	League	Apps	Goals	Apps	Goals	Apps	Goals	Apps	Goals	Apps	Goals
2009	Daejeon Citizen	K League 1	11	1	4	0	2	0	—		17	1
2010	Daejeon Citizen	K League 1	23	1	3	0	2	0	—		28	1
2011	Daejeon Citizen	K League 1	29	2	1	0	2	0	—		32	2
2012	Seongnam FC	K League 1	37	3	—		1	0	—		38	3
2013	Seongnam FC	K League 1	26	4	—		1	0	—		27	4
2014	Seongnam FC	K League 1	5	0	—		0	0	—		5	0
2014	Cerezo Osaka (loan)	J1 League	17	0	2	0	1	0	—		20	0
2015	Seongnam FC	K League 1	31	3	—		2	0	8	0	41	3
2016	Sangju Sangmu (army)	K League 1	36	3	—		0	0	—		36	3
2017	Sangju Sangmu (army)	K League 1	19	1	—		1	0	—		20	1
2018	FC Seoul	K League 1	11	1	—		0	0	—		11	1
Career total			245	19	10	0	12	0	8	0	275	19

== Honours ==
=== Club ===
Ulsan Hyundai

- AFC Champions League: 2020

=== International ===
South Korea

- EAFF East Asian Cup: 2017
