= Park Min-keun =

South Korean footballer

Park Min-Keun
Personal information
- Date of birth: 27 February 1984 (age 42)
- Place of birth: South Korea
- Height: 1.78 m (5 ft 10 in)
- Position: Midfielder

Team information
- Current team: Changwon City

Youth career
- Hannam University

Senior career*
Years	Team	Apps	(Gls)
2007	Jeju United	0	(0)
2007–2008	Yesan FC	11	(4)
2010	Changwon City	15	(0)
2011–2012	Daejeon Citizen	21	(0)
2013–	Changwon City	21	(0)
- * Club domestic league appearances and goals as of 19 December 2012

Park Min-Keun (Korean: 박민근; born 27 February 1984) is a South Korean footballer who plays as a midfielder for Changwon City.
