= Lee Jung-won =

South Korean footballer

Lee Jung-Won
Personal information
- Full name: Lee Jung-Won
- Date of birth: 27 July 1989 (age 37)
- Place of birth: South Korea
- Height: 1.76 m (5 ft 9 1/2 in)
- Position: Full back

Youth career
- 2008–2009: Soongsil University

Senior career*
Years	Team	Apps	(Gls)
2010–2011	Daejeon Citizen	11	(0)
- * Club domestic league appearances and goals as of 17 June 2011

- Lee Jung-won
- Hangul: 이중원
- Hanja: 李重元
- RR: I Jungwon
- MR: I Chungwŏn

Lee Jung-Won (Korean: 이중원; born 27 July 1989) is a South Korean former footballer who played as full back for Daejeon Citizen in the K-League.

On 17 June 2011, his football career was rescinded by the Korea Professional Football League with other accomplices.
