= Kim Young-bin =

South Korean footballer

Personal information
- Date of birth: 8 April 1984 (age 42)
- Place of birth: South Korea
- Height: 1.85 m (6 ft 1 in)
- Position: Defender

Youth career
- 2000–2002: Suwon Technical High School
- 2003–2007: Korea University

Senior career*
Years	Team	Apps	(Gls)
2007–2011	Incheon United	53	(4)
2011–2013	Daejeon Citizen	9	(0)
2012–2013	→ Sangju Sangmu Phoenix (army)	0	(0)
2014	Gyeongnam FC	6	(0)
- * Club domestic league appearances and goals

- Kim Young-bin
- Hangul: 김영빈
- Hanja: 金榮彬
- RR: Gim Yeongbin
- MR: Kim Yŏngbin

Kim Young-bin (Korean: 김영빈; born 8 April 1984) is a retired South Korean footballer who plays as defender for Gyeongnam FC.
