= Han Jae-woong =

South Korean footballer

Han Jae-Woong
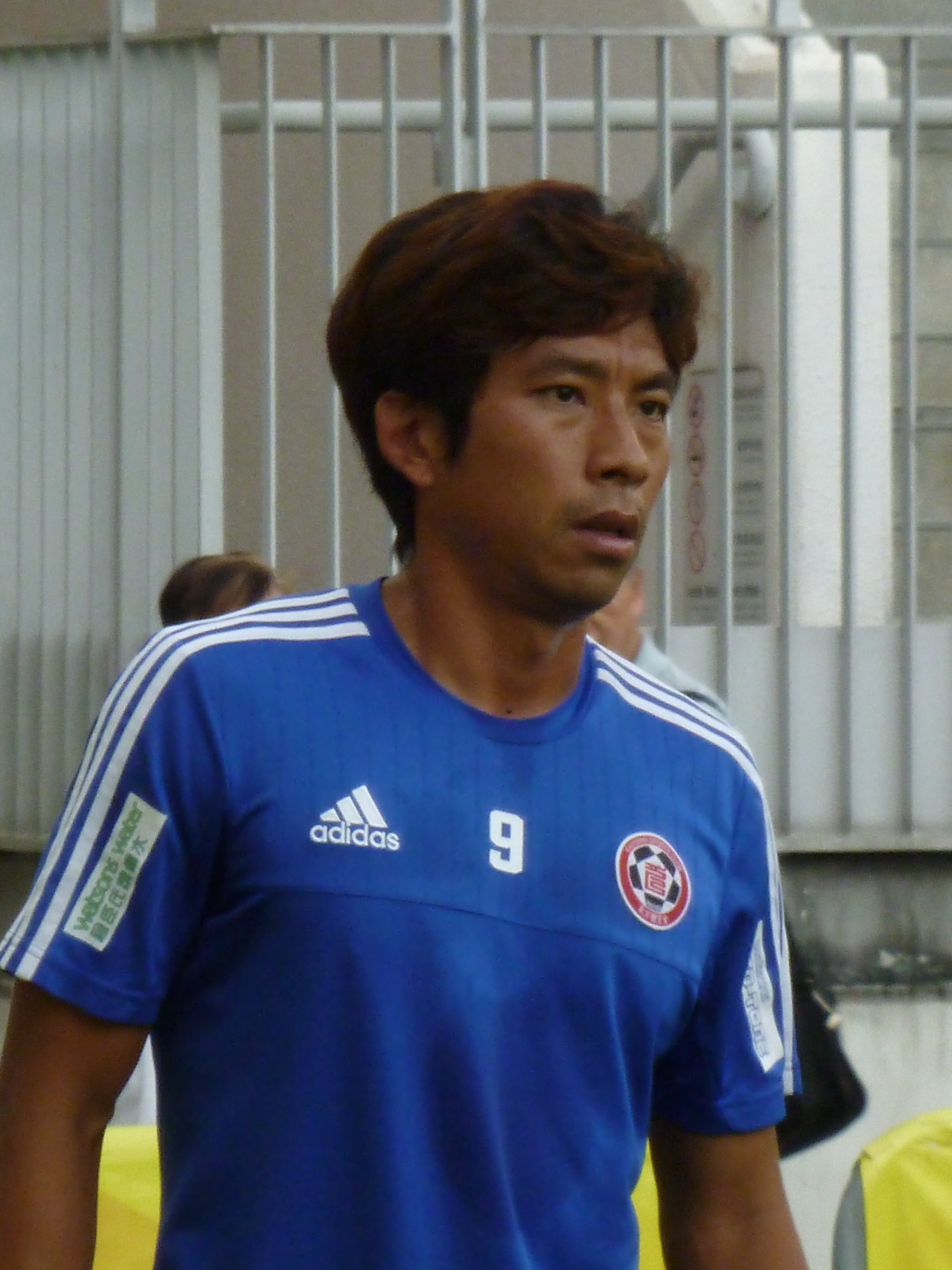

Personal information
- Date of birth: 29 September 1984 (age 42)
- Place of birth: Incheon, South Korea
- Height: 1.78 m (5 ft 10 in)
- Position: Winger

Senior career*
Years	Team	Apps	(Gls)
2003–2008	Busan I'Park	13	(2)
2008–2011	Daejeon Citizen	69	(8)
2012	Chunnam Dragons	24	(0)
2013	Incheon United	0	(0)
2013	Buriram United	6	(0)
2013	Incheon United	3	(0)
2014	Ulsan Hyundai	7	(0)
2015	Rangers (HKG)	5	(1)
2015	Eastern	3	(0)
2016–2017	Daegu FC	15	(0)

International career
2003	South Korea U-20	9	(0)
- * Club domestic league appearances and goals

Han Jae-Woong (Korean: 한재웅, Chinese: 韓載雄; born 29 September 1984) is a retired South Korean football player. He played for Busan I'Park, Daejeon Citizen, Chunnam Dragons, Incheon United, Ulsan Hyundai, Daegu FC, Thai club Buriram United, Hong Kong clubs Rangers (HKG) and Eastern.

Han played at the 2003 FIFA World Youth Championship.

== Club career statistics ==
As of 4 March 2013

Club performance			League		Cup		League Cup		Continental		Total	
Season	Club	League	Apps	Goals	Apps	Goals	Apps	Goals	Apps	Goals	Apps	Goals
South Korea			League		KFA Cup		League Cup		Asia		Total	
2003	Busan I'Park	K League 1	1	0	0	0	-		-		1	0
2004	Busan I'Park	K League 1	2	0	2	1	2	0	-		6	1
2005	Busan I'Park	K League 1	9	2	0	0	4	0	?	2		
2006	Busan I'Park	K League 1	0	0	0	0	0	0	-		0	0
2007	Busan I'Park	K League 1	1	0	0	0	0	0	-		1	0
2008	Busan I'Park	K League 1	0	0	0	0	2	0	-		2	0
2008	Daejeon Citizen	K League 1	10	0	0	0	3	1	-		13	1
2009	Daejeon Citizen	K League 1	16	3	2	0	3	0	-		21	3
2010	Daejeon Citizen	K League 1	20	2	2	0	3	1	-		25	3
2011	Daejeon Citizen	K League 1	23	3	2	1	2	0	-		27	4
2012	Chunnam Dragons	K League 1	24	0	2	0	-		-		26	0
Career total			106	10	10	2	19	2				
