= Park Sang-wook (footballer) =

South Korean footballer

Personal information
- Full name: Park Sang-wook
- Date of birth: 30 January 1986 (age 40)
- Place of birth: South Korea
- Height: 1.88 m (6 ft 2 in)
- Position: Midfielder

Youth career
- 2004–2007: Daegu Arts University

Senior career*
| Years | Team | Apps | (Gls) |
| 2008–2010 | Ulsan Hyundai | 0 | (0) |
| 2009–2010 | → Gwangju Sangmu (army) | 3 | (0) |
| 2011 | Daejeon Citizen | 0 | (0) |
- * Club domestic league appearances and goals as of 17 June 2011

- Park Sang-wook
- Hangul: 박상욱
- Hanja: 朴相旭
- RR: Bak Sanguk
- MR: Pak Sanguk

Park Sang-wook (Korean: 박상욱; born 30 January 1986) is a South Korean footballer.

He was arrested on the charge connected with the match-fixing scandal on 26 March 2011. On 17 June 2011, his football career was rescinded by the Korea Professional Football League with other accomplices.
