= Kim Tae-yeon (actress) =

South Korean actress (born 1976)

- Born: January 3, 1976 (age 50); Seoul, South Korea
- Education: Inha Technical College - Aircraft Management
- Occupation: Actress
- Years active: 1996–2007

Korean name
- Hangul: 김태연
- Hanja: 金兌姸
- RR: Gim Taeyeon
- MR: Kim T'aeyŏn

Kim Tae-yeon (Korean: 김태연; born January 3, 1976) is a South Korean actress. She began her entertainment career as a model, winning Model Line's 40th Fashion Model contest in 1996 and the Pantene Model contest sponsored by Ford Models in 2000. Kim made her film debut in the highly controversial film Lies in 1999.

== Filmography ==
=== Film ===
- Foolish Game (2004)
- Love Her (2001)
- Lies (1999)

=== Television series ===
- Modern Housewives (MBC, 2007)
- Drama City: "Shocking Marriage" (KBS2, 2006)
- Can Love Be Refilled? (KBS2, 2005)
- When a Man is in Love (SBS, 2004)
- Jang Gil-san (SBS, 2004)
- Traveling Women (SBS, 2004)
- MBC Best Theater: "The Luncheon on the Grass" (MBC, 2004)
- MBC Best Theater: "Cinderella" (MBC, 2003)
- Drama City: "The Reason I'm Getting Married" (KBS2, 2003)
- Scent of a Man (MBC, 2003)
- Thousand Years of Love (SBS, 2003)
- All In (2003)
- Love Story (SBS, 1999) (episode 5: "Rose")

=== Music video appearance ===
- Freestyle - "Party Time" (1999)

=== Radio ===
- Film and Music Room (BBS Radio, 2007) - DJ
