= Kim Tae-yeon (painter) =

South Korean painter based in Seoul (born 1986)

- Born: 27 August 1986 (age 39); Seoul, South Korea
- Education: Seoul National University
- Occupation: Painter

Kim Tae-yeon (Korean: 김태연; Korean pronunciation: [kimtʰɛjʌn]; born 27 August 1986) is a South Korean painter based in Seoul.

== Education ==
- 2006–2010 Bachelor of Fine Arts in Oriental Painting from Seoul National University
- 2010–2013 Master of Fine Arts in Oriental Painting from Seoul National University

== Exhibitions ==
- Second solo exhibition: Revived 12 gods (Korean: 십이지생도; Hanja: 12支生圖), 2013
- Third solo exhibition: Living Templates (Korean: 유미독존도; Hanja: 唯美獨尊圖), 2014
