= Lee Ho (footballer, born 1986) =

South Korean footballer

Personal information
- Date of birth: January 6, 1986 (age 40)
- Place of birth: Gimpo, South Korea
- Height: 1.87 m (6 ft 1 1/2 in)
- Position: Defender

Youth career
- 2001–2003: Anyang Technical High School
- 2005–2008: Kyunghee University

Senior career*
Years	Team	Apps	(Gls)
2009	Gangwon FC	0	(0)
2010–2014	Daejeon Citizen	58	(1)
2013–2014	→ Ansan Police (army)	28	(2)
2015	Port	24	(2)
- * Club domestic league appearances and goals as of 17 November 2014

- Lee Ho
- Hangul: 이호
- Hanja: 李虎
- RR: I Ho
- MR: I Ho

Lee Ho (Korean: 이호; Hanja: 李虎; born January 6, 1986) is a South Korean football player.

== Club career ==
On November 18, 2008, Lee was one of sixteen priority members to join Gangwon FC. He made his debut for Gangwon against Chunnam Dragons on May 27, 2009 in Gangwon's last league cup match of 2009.

On 5 January 2010, he moved to Daejeon Citizen.

=== Club career statistics ===
As of 31 October 2011

Club performance			League		Cup		League Cup		Total	
Season	Club	League	Apps	Goals	Apps	Goals	Apps	Goals	Apps	Goals
South Korea			League		KFA Cup		League Cup		Total	
2009	Gangwon FC	K-League	0	0	0	0	1	0	1	0
2010	Daejeon Citizen	K-League	5	0	0	0	2	0	7	0
2011	Daejeon Citizen	K-League	25	1	2	0	0	0	27	1
Career total			30	1	2	0	3	0	35	1

== Honours ==
=== Team ===
Kyunghee University

- Korea University Football League MVP: 2008

Sporting positions
Preceded by Park Sung-Ho	Daejeon Citizen captain 2012	Succeeded by Park Jin-Ok
