= Wagner Querino =

Brazilian footballer

Personal information
- Full name: Wagner Querino da Silva
- Date of birth: 31 January 1987 (age 39)
- Place of birth: Pilar, Alagoas, Brazil
- Height: 1.74 m (5 ft 9 in)
- Position: Forward

Senior career*
Years	Team	Apps	(Gls)
2010	Londrina		
2011	Daejeon Citizen	27	(11)
2012	Al Nassr	7	(4)
2013	Al Hidd	18	(14)
2014	FC Anyang	17	(1)
- * Club domestic league appearances and goals as of 24 November 2014

Wagner Querino da Silva (born 31 January 1987) is a Brazilian former professional footballer who played as a forward.

Wagner Querino joined South Korean club Daejeon Citizen on 20 January 2011 and registered for the league under the Korean name "Park Eun-ho" which is pronounced similarly to his real name.
