= Wang Sun-jae =

South Korean footballer (born 1959)

Wang Sun-Jae 왕선재
Personal information
- Full name: Wang Sun-Jae
- Date of birth: 19 March 1959 (age 67)
- Place of birth: South Korea
- Position: Forward

Youth career
- Yonsei University

Senior career*
Years	Team	Apps	(Gls)
1983–1984	Hanil Bank	27	(7)
1985–1986	Lucky-Goldstar Hwangso	19	(1)
1987–1988	POSCO Atoms	3	(0)
1988–1989	Hyundai Horang-i	23	(0)
Total		72	(8)

International career^{‡}
1984	South Korea	1	(2)

Managerial career
- 1992–1994: Wonju Technical High School
- 1998–2000: Dong-A University
- 2002–2003: Suwon Bluewings (Coach)
- 2007: Adap Galo Maringá
- 2007–2009: Daejeon Citizen (Coach)
- 2009–2011: Daejeon Citizen
- 2018: Yanbian Beiguo
- * Club domestic league appearances and goals as of 18 November 2008 ‡ National team caps and goals as of 18 November 2008

Wang Sun-Jae (Korean: 왕선재; born 19 March 1959) is a South Korean former footballer who plays as a forward. He is a current manager of Yanbian Beiguo.

In 1983, he was top scorer of Korean League 1983 (Semi-professional) and Hanil Bank won the trophy.

He was part of the South Korea national football team. He played at 1984 AFC Asian Cup, 1986 FIFA World Cup qualification.

== Club career statistics ==
All-Time Club Performance
Club	Season	League			League Cup			AFC Champions League			Total
Club	Season	Apps	Goals	Assts	Apps	Goals	Assts	Apps	Goals	Assts	Apps	Goals	Assts
Hanil Bank	1984	27	7	8	-	-	-	-	-	-	27	7	8
Hanil Bank	Total	27	7	8	-	-	-	-	-	-	27	7	8
Lucky-Goldstar Hwangso	1985	14	1	5	-	-	-	-	-	-	14	1	5
Lucky-Goldstar Hwangso	1986	5	0	2	2	0	0	?	?	?
Lucky-Goldstar Hwangso	Total	19	1	7	2	0	0
POSCO Atoms	1987	2	0	0	-	-	-	-	-	-	2	0	0
POSCO Atoms	1988	1	0	0	-	-	-	-	-	-	1	0	0
POSCO Atoms	Total	3	0	0	-	-	-	-	-	-	3	0	0
Hyundai Horang-i	1988	5	0	0	-	-	-	-	-	-	5	0	0
Hyundai Horang-i	1989	18	0	1	-	-	-	-	-	-	18	0	1
Hyundai Horang-i	Total	23	0	1	-	-	-	-	-	-	23	0	1
Career totals		72	8	16	2	0	0

== Coach & Manager career ==
- 1992-1994 : Wonju Technical High School manager
- 1998-2000 : Dong-A University
- 2001 : Suwon Samsung Bluewings scout & Reserve team coach
- 2002-2003 : Suwon Bluewings head coach
- 2007. 1.-4. : Adap Galo Maringá Football Club manager
- 2007. 8.- 2009. 6. : Daejeon Citizen head coach
- 2009. 6.- 2011. 7. : Daejeon Citizen manager
- 2018. 1.- : Yanbian Beiguo manager
