= Kim Tae-yeon (footballer) =

South Korean footballer

Kim Tae-Yeon
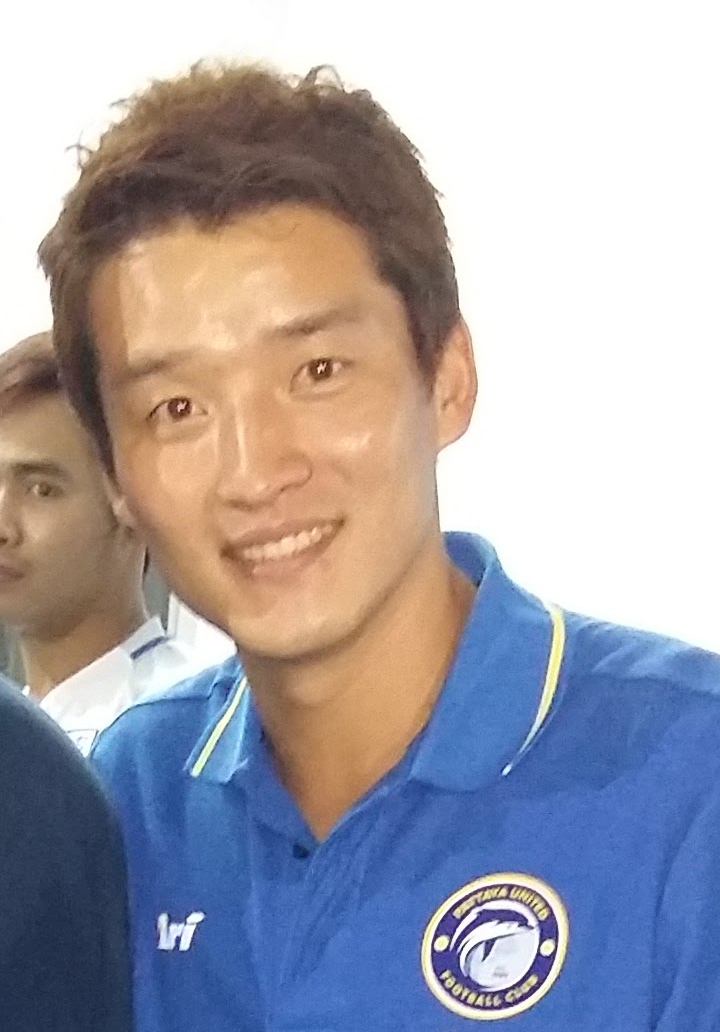

Personal information
- Date of birth: 27 June 1988 (age 38)
- Place of birth: Seoul, South Korea
- Height: 1.85 m (6 ft 1 in)
- Positions: Defensive midfielder; centre-back

Youth career
- 2004–2005: Janghoon High School
- 2004–2005: → FC Metz (KFA Youth Project)

Senior career*
Years	Team	Apps	(Gls)
2006–2007	Vissel Kobe	10	(0)
2008	Ehime	27	(0)
2009	Mito HollyHock	47	(2)
2010	Fagiano Okayama	22	(1)
2011	Tokyo Verdy	0	(0)
2011–2013	Daejeon Citizen	79	(5)
2014	Shenyang Zhongze	11	(0)
2014	Gwangju FC	0	(0)
2015	Busan IPark	0	(0)
2016	Roasso Kumamoto	31	(2)
2017–2018	Pattaya United	66	(0)
2019	Samut Prakan City	15	(1)

International career
2007	South Korea U-20	1	(0)
- * Club domestic league appearances and goals

- Kim Tae-yeon
- Hangul: 김태연
- Hanja: 金泰橪
- RR: Gim Taeyeon
- MR: Kim T'aeyŏn

Kim Tae-Yeon (born 27 June 1988 in Seoul) is a South Korean footballer who plays as a defensive midfielder, he has also been used as a centre-back.

== Club career statistics ==
Club performance			League		Cup		League Cup		Total	
Season	Club	League	Apps	Goals	Apps	Goals	Apps	Goals	Apps	Goals
Japan			League		Emperor's Cup		J. League Cup		Total	
2006	Vissel Kobe	J. League 2	5	0	1	0	-		6	0
2007	Vissel Kobe	J. League 1	5	0	0	0	1	0	6	0
2008	Ehime	J. League 2	27	0	0	0	-		27	0
2009	Mito HollyHock	J. League 2	47	2	1	0	-		48	2
2010	Fagiano Okayama	J. League 2	22	1	1	0	-		23	1
2011	Tokyo Verdy	J. League 2	0	0	0	0	-		0	0
Korea Republic			League		FA Cup		K-League Cup		Total	
2011	Daejeon Citizen	K League 1	11	0	0	0	0	0	11	0
2012	Daejeon Citizen	K League 1								
Country	Japan		106	3	3	0	1	0	110	3
Country	Korea Republic		11	0	0	0	0	0	11	0
Total			117	3	3	0	1	0	121	3
