= 2011 K-League =

Hyundai Oilbank K League
- Season: 2011
- Dates: Regular season: 5 March – 30 October 2011; Championship: 19 November – 4 December 2011
- Champions: Jeonbuk Hyundai Motors (2nd title)
- Champions League: Jeonbuk Hyundai Motors; Ulsan Hyundai; Pohang Steelers; Seongnam Ilhwa Chunma
- Matches: 246
- Goals: 669 (2.72 per match)
- Best player: Lee Dong-gook
- Top goalscorer: Dejan Damjanović (23 goals)
- Biggest home win: Pohang 7–0 Daejeon (9 July 2011)
- Biggest away win: Incheon 2–6 Jeonbuk (30 April 2011)
- Highest scoring: Seoul 6–3 Gangwon (27 August 2011)
- Longest winning run: 7 matches FC Seoul
- Longest unbeaten run: 20 matches Jeonbuk Hyundai Motors
- Longest winless run: 14 matches Daejeon Citizen
- Longest losing run: 8 matches Gangwon FC
- Highest attendance: 51,606; Seoul 0–2 Suwon (6 March 2011)
- Lowest attendance: 1,027; Daegu 2–3 Busan (9 July 2011)
- Average attendance: 11,634

The 2011 K League, officially known as Hyundai Oilbank K-League 2011, was the 29th season of the K League. It was sponsored by Hyundai Oilbank.

== Teams ==
Locations of the 2011 K League clubs

=== General information ===
Club	Manager	City	Stadium	2010 season
Busan IPark	(South Korea) An Ik-soo	Busan	Busan Asiad Stadium	8th place
Jeonnam Dragons	(South Korea) Jung Hae-seong	Gwangyang	Gwangyang Football Stadium	10th place
Daegu FC	(South Korea) Lee Young-jin	Daegu	Daegu Stadium; Daegu Civic Stadium	15th place
Daejeon Citizen	(South Korea) Yoo Sang-chul	Daejeon	Daejeon World Cup Stadium	13th place
Gangwon FC	(South Korea) Kim Sang-ho	Gangneung; Chuncheon	Gangneung Stadium; Chuncheon Stadium	12th place
Gwangju FC	(South Korea) Choi Man-hee	Gwangju	Gwangju World Cup Stadium	—
Gyeongnam FC	(South Korea) Choi Jin-han	Changwon	Changwon Football Center	6th place
Incheon United	(South Korea) Huh Jung-moo	Incheon	Incheon Munhak Stadium	11th place
Jeju United	(South Korea) Park Kyung-hoon	Seogwipo	Jeju World Cup Stadium	Runners-up
Jeonbuk Hyundai Motors	(South Korea) Choi Kang-hee	Jeonju	Jeonju World Cup Stadium	3rd place
Pohang Steelers	(South Korea) Hwang Sun-hong	Pohang	Pohang Steel Yard	9th place
Sangju Sangmu Phoenix	(South Korea) Kim Tae-wan	Sangju	Sangju Civic Stadium	14th place
Seongnam Ilhwa Chunma	(South Korea) Shin Tae-yong	Seongnam	Tancheon Sports Complex	4th place
FC Seoul	(South Korea) Choi Yong-soo	Seoul	Seoul World Cup Stadium	Champions
Suwon Samsung Bluewings	(South Korea) Yoon Sung-hyo	Suwon	Suwon World Cup Stadium	7th place
Ulsan Hyundai	(South Korea) Kim Ho-kon	Ulsan	Ulsan Munsu Football Stadium	5th place

=== Managerial changes ===
Team	Outgoing	Manner	Date	Incoming	Date	Table
Jeonnam Dragons	(South Korea) Park Hang-seo	Resigned	5 November 2010	(South Korea) Jung Hae-seong	10 November 2010	Pre-season
Busan IPark	(South Korea) Hwang Sun-hong	End of contract	9 November 2010	(South Korea) An Ik-soo	8 December 2010	Pre-season
Pohang Steelers	(South Korea) Park Chang-hyun	Caretaker	9 November 2010	(South Korea) Hwang Sun-hong	9 November 2010	Pre-season
FC Seoul	(Portugal) Nelo Vingada	Resigned	12 December 2010	(South Korea) Hwangbo Kwan	28 December 2010	Pre-season
Gangwon FC	(South Korea) Choi Soon-ho	Resigned	4 April 2011	(South Korea) Kim Sang-ho	4 April 2011	16th
FC Seoul	(South Korea) Hwangbo Kwan	Resigned	26 April 2011	(South Korea) Choi Yong-soo	26 April 2011	14th
Daejeon Citizen	(South Korea) Wang Sun-jae	Sacked	4 July 2011	(South Korea) Yoo Sang-chul	17 July 2011	15th
Sangju Sangmu Phoenix	(South Korea) Lee Soo-chul	Resigned	11 July 2011	(South Korea) Kim Tae-wan	14 July 2011	13th

=== Foreign players ===
Club	Player 1	Player 2	Player 3	AFC player	Former player(s)
Busan IPark	(Brazil) Éder Baiano	(Brazil) Fágner		(Australia) Iain Fyfe	(Brazil) Felipe Azevedo (Netherlands) Bas van den Brink
Chunnam Dragons	(Brazil) Índio	(Brazil) Weslley	(Colombia) Javier Reina	(Australia) Robert Cornthwaite	
Daegu FC	(Brazil) Juninho	(Brazil) Matheus	(Brazil) Thiago Quirino		
Daejeon Citizen	(Brazil) Wagner Querino	(China) Bai Zijian		(Japan) Yuta Baba	(Brazil) Wésley Brasilia
Gangwon FC	(Bosnia and Herzegovina) Muhamed Džakmić	(Croatia) Mateas Delić			(Croatia) Stipe Lapić (Japan) Masahiro Ohashi
Gwangju FC	(Brazil) Alessandro Celin	(Brazil) João Paulo			(Brazil) Vinícius Lopes
Gyeongnam FC	(Brazil) Morato	(Brazil) Roni	(Colombia) Wilmar Jordán	(Australia) Luke DeVere	(Brazil) Lúcio Curió
Incheon United	(Brazil) Almir	(Brazil) Elionar Bombinha	(Brazil) Fábio Bahia	(Uzbekistan) Timur Kapadze	(Brazil) Luizinho (Brazil) Diego Giaretta
Jeju United		(Brazil) Jair	(Brazil) Júnior Santos		(Brazil) Felipinho
Jeonbuk Hyundai Motors	(Brazil) Eninho	(Brazil) Luiz Henrique	(Croatia) Krunoslav Lovrek	(China) Huang Bowen	
Pohang Steelers	(Brazil) Adriano Chuva	(Brazil) Mota	(Ghana) Derek Asamoah		
Sangju Sangmu Phoenix					
Seongnam Ilhwa Chunma	(Brazil) Éverton Santos	(Brazil) Héverton	(Montenegro) Dženan Radončić	(Australia) Sasa Ognenovski	(Brazil) Jean Carlos
FC Seoul	(Brazil) Adilson	(Colombia) Mauricio Molina	(Montenegro) Dejan Damjanović		(Uzbekistan) Server Djeparov
Suwon Samsung Bluewings	(Brazil) Diego Oliveira	(Croatia) Mato Neretljak	(North Macedonia) Stevica Ristić	(Uzbekistan) Alexander Geynrikh	(Brazil) Bergson (Brazil) Marcel
Ulsan Hyundai	(Brazil) Lúcio Curió	(Brazil) Vinicius	(Colombia) Juan Velez		(Brazil) Magnum (Saudi Arabia) Naji Majrashi

== Regular season ==
=== League table ===
Pos	Team	Pld	W	D	L	GF	GA	GD	Pts	Qualification
1	Jeonbuk Hyundai Motors	30	18	9	3	67	32	+35	63	Qualification for the K League playoffs final
2	Pohang Steelers	30	17	8	5	59	33	+26	59	Qualification for the K League playoffs semi-final
3	FC Seoul	30	16	7	7	56	38	+18	55	Qualification for the K League playoffs first round
4	Suwon Samsung Bluewings	30	17	4	9	51	33	+18	55	Qualification for the K League playoffs first round
5	Busan IPark	30	13	7	10	49	43	+6	46	Qualification for the K League playoffs first round
6	Ulsan Hyundai	30	13	7	10	33	29	+4	46	Qualification for the K League playoffs first round
7	Jeonnam Dragons	30	11	10	9	33	29	+4	43	
8	Gyeongnam FC	30	12	6	12	41	40	+1	42	
9	Jeju United	30	10	10	10	44	45	−1	40	
10	Seongnam Ilhwa Chunma	30	9	8	13	43	47	−4	35	Qualification for the Champions League group stage (Note: Qualified as champions of the FA Cup.)
11	Gwangju FC	30	9	8	13	32	43	−11	35	
12	Daegu FC	30	8	9	13	35	46	−11	33	
13	Incheon United	30	6	14	10	31	40	−9	32	
14	Sangju Sangmu Phoenix	30	7	8	15	36	53	−17	29	
15	Daejeon Citizen	30	6	9	15	31	59	−28	27	
16	Gangwon FC	30	3	6	21	14	45	−31	15	

Source: K League
Rules for classification: 1) Points; 2) Goal difference; 3) Goals scored

=== Positions by matchday ===
Team ╲ Round	1	2	3	4	5	6	7	8	9	10	11	12	13	14	15	16	17	18	19	20	21	22	23	24	25	26	27	28	29	30
Jeonbuk Hyundai Motors	13	9	5	9	9	5	2	2	1	2	1	1	1	1	1	1	1	1	1	1	1	1	1	1	1	1	1	1	1	1
Pohang Steelers	8	5	3	2	2	1	1	1	2	1	2	2	2	2	2	2	2	2	2	2	2	2	2	2	2	2	2	2	2	2
FC Seoul	15	13	15	11	12	12	14	13	10	7	9	11	12	9	9	10	6	7	6	4	3	3	3	3	3	3	4	4	4	3
Suwon Samsung Bluewings	1	1	7	3	4	2	4	4	6	8	10	12	14	11	7	5	9	8	9	8	6	5	4	4	4	4	3	3	3	4
Busan IPark	11	11	14	15	15	15	13	12	9	9	6	7	8	12	8	6	5	5	3	6	4	4	6	6	6	6	6	5	6	5
Ulsan Hyundai	11	15	11	13	10	10	11	10	13	14	13	9	7	7	11	11	12	9	8	9	9	9	10	9	8	7	7	6	5	6
Jeonnam Dragons	6	9	6	8	8	7	9	9	7	5	4	5	5	5	4	4	4	3	4	5	7	7	5	5	5	5	5	7	8	7
Gyeongnam FC	6	2	8	4	7	9	7	5	4	6	8	8	10	8	12	12	8	6	7	7	8	8	8	8	9	9	9	8	7	8
Jeju United	4	5	4	6	6	8	6	7	5	3	5	4	3	3	3	3	3	4	5	3	5	6	7	7	7	8	8	9	9	9
Seongnam Ilhwa Chunma	8	12	13	10	11	13	15	15	15	15	15	15	15	14	14	15	14	14	15	14	14	13	11	12	13	11	10	10	10	10
Gwangju FC	3	7	10	12	13	14	12	11	14	11	14	13	11	10	13	13	11	12	12	12	13	14	14	14	12	13	13	11	11	11
Daegu FC	10	8	9	7	3	4	8	8	12	13	11	10	9	13	10	8	10	11	11	11	12	12	13	11	11	12	11	12	12	12
Incheon United	15	14	12	14	14	11	10	14	11	10	7	6	6	6	5	7	7	10	10	10	10	10	9	10	10	10	12	13	13	13
Sangju Sangmu Phoenix	1	3	1	5	5	6	3	3	3	4	3	3	4	4	6	9	13	13	13	13	11	11	12	13	14	14	14	14	14	14
Daejeon Citizen	4	4	2	1	1	3	5	6	8	12	12	14	13	15	15	14	15	15	14	15	15	15	15	15	15	15	15	15	15	15
Gangwon FC	13	16	16	16	16	16	16	16	16	16	16	16	16	16	16	16	16	16	16	16	16	16	16	16	16	16	16	16	16	16

Source: K League

=== Results ===
Home \ Away	BIP	JND	DGU	DJC	GWN	GWJ	GNM	ICU	JJU	JHM	PHS	SSP	SIC	SEO	SSB	USH
Busan IPark	—	3–0	2–2	1–0	2–0	1–1	0–1	1–0	3–1	2–3	2–1	3–3	1–0	1–1	4–3	2–0
Jeonnam Dragons	1–1	—	3–1	2–0	1–0	0–2	2–0	0–0	1–1	1–1	0–1	0–1	0–0	3–0	3–1	0–1
Daegu FC	2–3	1–0	—	1–1	1–0	1–2	2–1	2–0	0–2	1–2	1–1	0–0	2–1	2–1	1–2	0–0
Daejeon Citizen	1–3	4–4	2–2	—	1–0	1–0	2–0	1–2	0–0	2–3	0–0	1–3	0–2	1–1	1–3	1–0
Gangwon FC	1–0	1–1	1–0	0–3	—	0–1	0–1	1–3	2–4	0–3	0–2	2–0	1–1	0–2	0–1	1–2
Gwangju FC	2–2	0–0	3–2	2–1	2–0	—	0–2	0–1	2–2	1–1	0–1	0–0	2–0	1–0	0–1	0–0
Gyeongnam FC	3–2	1–2	3–0	7–1	0–0	1–0	—	2–1	1–1	1–3	2–3	0–1	2–2	0–3	0–2	1–0
Incheon United	0–0	1–1	1–1	2–0	0–0	2–2	2–2	—	0–0	2–6	0–1	0–0	2–1	1–1	2–1	0–2
Jeju United	2–1	0–1	3–0	3–3	1–0	2–1	2–3	2–1	—	0–0	1–3	3–3	2–1	0–3	3–2	1–2
Jeonbuk Hyundai Motors	5–2	0–1	2–2	0–0	1–0	6–1	2–0	4–2	3–2	—	3–1	5–1	2–0	2–2	0–0	1–0
Pohang Steelers	3–2	1–1	2–2	7–0	0–0	5–1	1–0	2–2	2–1	3–2	—	4–3	1–1	1–2	2–0	2–0
Sangju Sangmu Phoenix	1–2	0–1	1–2	0–0	0–0	2–0	1–3	2–0	1–1	0–3	1–3	—	1–3	3–4	1–0	1–2
Seongnam Ilhwa Chunma	2–0	3–2	1–0	2–1	3–1	1–3	1–1	2–2	2–2	0–1	1–3	2–3	—	2–0	1–1	3–2
FC Seoul	2–1	1–0	0–2	4–1	6–3	4–1	3–1	1–1	2–1	3–1	1–1	3–2	3–1	—	0–2	1–1
Suwon Samsung Bluewings	1–2	1–2	4–1	4–0	2–0	2–1	1–2	1–0	2–0	2–2	2–1	3–0	3–2	1–0	—	2–1
Ulsan Hyundai	1–0	2–0	2–1	1–2	1–0	2–1	0–0	1–1	0–1	0–0	2–1	3–1	3–2	1–2	1–1	—

Source: K League
Legend: Blue = home team win; Yellow = draw; Red = away team win.

== Championship playoffs ==
=== Bracket ===
First round
3	FC Seoul	1
6	Ulsan Hyundai	3
4	Suwon Samsung Bluewings	1
5	Busan IPark	0

Second round
Ulsan Hyundai (p)	1 (3)
Suwon Samsung Bluewings	1 (1)

Semifinal
2	Pohang Steelers	0
Ulsan Hyundai	1

Final
1	Jeonbuk Hyundai Motors	2	2	4
Ulsan Hyundai	1	1	2

=== Final table ===
Pos	Team	Qualification
1	Jeonbuk Hyundai Motors (C)	Qualification for the Champions League group stage
2	Ulsan Hyundai	Qualification for the Champions League group stage
3	Pohang Steelers	Qualification for the Champions League playoff round
4	Suwon Samsung Bluewings	
5	FC Seoul	
6	Busan IPark	

Source: RSSSF
(C) Champions

== Player statistics ==
=== Top scorers ===
Rank	Player	Club	Goals
1	(Montenegro) Dejan Damjanović	FC Seoul	23
2	(South Korea) Lee Dong-gook	Jeonbuk Hyundai Motors	16
3	(South Korea) Kim Jung-woo	Sangju Sangmu Phoenix; Seongnam Ilhwa Chunma	15
4	(Brazil) Júnior Santos	Jeju United	14
5	(Brazil) Mota	Pohang Steelers	13
6	(South Korea) Kim Dong-chan	Jeonbuk Hyundai Motors	10
6	(Colombia) Mauricio Molina	FC Seoul	10
8	(South Korea) Han Sang-woon	Busan IPark	9
8	(South Korea) Lim Sang-hyub	Busan IPark	9
8	(South Korea) Yang Dong-hyun	Busan IPark	9
8	(South Korea) Ko Moo-yeol	Pohang Steelers	9
8	(North Macedonia) Stevica Ristić	Suwon Samsung Bluewings	9
8	(South Korea) Yeom Ki-hun	Suwon Samsung Bluewings	9

=== Top assist providers ===
Rank	Player	Club	Assists
1	(South Korea) Lee Dong-gook	Jeonbuk Hyundai Motors	15
2	(South Korea) Yeom Ki-hun	Suwon Samsung Bluewings	13
3	(Colombia) Mauricio Molina	FC Seoul	12
4	(South Korea) Kim Eun-jung	Jeju United	8
4	(Brazil) Mota	Pohang Steelers	8
6	(South Korea) Han Sang-woon	Busan IPark	7
6	(Montenegro) Dejan Damjanović	FC Seoul	7
6	(South Korea) Koh Myong-jin	FC Seoul	7
6	(South Korea) Choi Jae-soo	Ulsan Hyundai	7
10	(South Korea) Yoon Bit-garam	Gyeongnam FC	6
10	(South Korea) Yun Il-lok	Gyeongnam FC	6
10	(South Korea) Bae Ki-jong	Jeju United	6
10	(South Korea) Hwang Jin-sung	Pohang Steelers	6

== Awards ==
=== Main awards ===
Award	Winner	Club
Most Valuable Player	(South Korea) Lee Dong-gook	Jeonbuk Hyundai Motors
Top goalscorer	(Montenegro) Dejan Damjanović	FC Seoul
Top assist provider	(South Korea) Lee Dong-gook	Jeonbuk Hyundai Motors
Rookie of the Year	(South Korea) Yoon Bit-garam	Gyeongnam FC
FANtastic Player	(South Korea) Lee Dong-gook	Jeonbuk Hyundai Motors
Manager of the Year	(South Korea) Choi Kang-hee	Jeonbuk Hyundai Motors

=== Best XI ===
Position	Winner	Club
Goalkeeper	(South Korea) Kim Young-kwang	Ulsan Hyundai
Defenders	(South Korea) Park Won-jae	Jeonbuk Hyundai Motors
Defenders	(South Korea) Cho Sung-hwan	Jeonbuk Hyundai Motors
Defenders	(South Korea) Choi Chul-soon	Jeonbuk Hyundai Motors
Defenders	(South Korea) Kwak Tae-hwi	Ulsan Hyundai
Midfielders	(South Korea) Yeom Ki-hun	Suwon Samsung Bluewings
Midfielders	(South Korea) Ha Dae-sung	FC Seoul
Midfielders	(Brazil) Eninho	Jeonbuk Hyundai Motors
Midfielders	(South Korea) Yoon Bit-garam	Gyeongnam FC
Forwards	(South Korea) Lee Dong-gook	Jeonbuk Hyundai Motors
Forwards	(Montenegro) Dejan Damjanović	FC Seoul

== Attendance ==
=== Attendance by club ===
Pos	Team	Total	High	Low	Average	Change
1	FC Seoul	447,397	51,606	9,797	27,962	−9.4%
2	Suwon Samsung Bluewings	400,073	44,537	13,004	23,534	−11.6%
3	Jeonbuk Hyundai Motors	259,790	33,554	8,334	16,237	+13.5%
4	Ulsan Hyundai	254,164	34,758	3,376	15,885	+104.0%
5	Daejeon Citizen	213,653	32,340	4,771	14,244	+66.1%
6	Pohang Steelers	226,527	21,317	5,473	14,158	+26.7%
7	Gyeongnam FC	136,021	22,468	1,214	9,068	−27.5%
8	Gwangju FC	131,844	36,241	2,515	8,790	n/a^{†}
9	Sangju Sangmu Phoenix	126,594	16,400	3,245	8,440	+123.2%
10	Incheon United	113,432	27,831	1,127	7,562	−11.8%
11	Busan IPark	108,630	29,267	2,336	7,242	+64.9%
12	Jeonnam Dragons	102,810	19,247	1,368	6,854	−42.9%
13	Daegu FC	97,157	20,187	1,027	6,477	+31.0%
14	Gangwon FC	87,676	15,497	2,017	5,845	−38.7%
15	Seongnam Ilhwa Chunma	86,952	12,131	2,893	5,797	+40.4%
16	Jeju United	69,138	12,775	1,191	4,609	−14.7%
	League total	2,861,858	51,606	1,027	11,634	+6.3%

Updated to games played on 4 December 2011
Source: K League
Notes:
^{†} First season in K League.
* Including K League Championship matches.

=== Top matches ===
Rank	Date	Home	Score	Away	Venue	Attendance	Matchday	Day of week
1	6 March 2011	FC Seoul	0–2	Suwon Samsung Bluewings	Seoul World Cup Stadium	51,606	Round 1	Sunday
2	3 October 2011	Suwon Samsung Bluewings	1–0	FC Seoul	Suwon World Cup Stadium	44,537	Round 27	Monday
3	11 June 2011	FC Seoul	1–1	Pohang Steelers	Seoul World Cup Stadium	44,358	Round 13	Saturday
4	23 October 2011	FC Seoul	3–1	Seongnam Ilhwa Chunma	Seoul World Cup Stadium	42,909	Round 29	Sunday
5	7 May 2011	Suwon Samsung Bluewings	1–2	Jeonnam Dragons	Suwon World Cup Stadium	38,068	Round 9	Saturday
6	5 March 2011	Gwangju FC	3–2	Daegu FC	Gwangju World Cup Stadium	36,241	Round 1	Saturday
7	6 March 2011	Ulsan Hyundai	1–2	Daejeon Citizen	Ulsan Munsu Football Stadium	34,758	Round 1	Sunday
8	18 September 2011	FC Seoul	2–1	Busan IPark	Seoul World Cup Stadium	33,663	Round 25	Sunday
9	4 December 2011	Jeonbuk Hyundai Motors	2–1	Ulsan Hyundai	Jeonju World Cup Stadium	33,554	Final 2nd leg	Sunday
10	12 March 2011	Daejeon Citizen	1–1	FC Seoul	Daejeon World Cup Stadium	32,340	Round 2	Saturday

== See also ==
- 2011 in South Korean football
- 2011 K League Championship
- 2011 Korean League Cup
- 2011 Korean FA Cup
