= 2011 Gyeongnam FC season =

Gyeongnam FC
2011 season
- Chairman: Gyeongsangnam-do provincial governor
- Manager: Choi Jin-Han
- K-League: 8th
- Korean FA Cup: Round of 32
- League Cup: Semifinal
- Top goalscorer: League: Yoon Bit-Garam (6); All: Yoon Bit-Garam (8)
- Highest home attendance: 22,468 vs Seoul (October 30)
- Lowest home attendance: 961 vs Pohang (May 11)
- Average home league attendance: 8,031
Home colours	Away colours

The 2011 season was Gyeongnam FC's sixth season in the K-League in South Korea. Chunnam Dragons competed in K-League, League Cup and Korean FA Cup.

== Current squad ==
Note: Flags indicate national team as defined under FIFA eligibility rules; some limited exceptions apply. Players may hold more than one non-FIFA nationality.

No.	Pos.	Nation	Player
1	GK	KOR	Kim Byung-Ji
3	DF	KOR	Park Jae-hong
4	DF	KOR	Kim Ju-Young
5	MF	KOR	Kim Tae-Wook
6	DF	AUS	Luke DeVere
7	MF	KOR	Kang Seung-Jo
8	MF	KOR	Yoon Bit-Garam
9	FW	COL	Jordán
10	FW	BRA	Roni
11	FW	KOR	Kim In-Han
12	MF	KOR	An Sung-Bin
13	DF	KOR	Lee Hea-Kang
14	FW	KOR	Lee Hun
15	DF	KOR	Lee Kyung-Ryul
16	DF	KOR	Park Min
17	DF	KOR	Lee Jae-Myung
18	DF	KOR	Jeon Won-Keun
19	GK	KOR	Lee Jung-Rae
20	DF	KOR	Lee Yong-Gi
21	MF	KOR	Seo Sang-Min
22	DF	KOR	Go Rae-Se

No.	Pos.	Nation	Player
23	MF	KOR	Lee Dong-Geun
24	FW	KOR	Yoon Il-Rok
25	MF	KOR	Jung Da-Hwon
26	MF	KOR	Choi Young-Jun
27	MF	KOR	Sim Jin-Hyung
28	FW	KOR	Lee Hyo-Kyun
29	MF	KOR	Kang Chul-Min
30	MF	KOR	Kim Jin-Hyun
31	GK	KOR	Kim Sun-Kyu
32	DF	KOR	Kim Jong-Soo
33	FW	KOR	Han Kyung-In
34	DF	KOR	Kim Min-Su
36	MF	KOR	Kim Jin-soo
37	MF	KOR	Oh Kwang-Jin
38	MF	KOR	Park Jin-Soo
39	FW	KOR	Jung Seung-Yong (on loan from FC Seoul)
40	DF	KOR	Choi Sung-Yong
41	FW	KOR	Jung Dae-Sun
55	DF	KOR	Cho Jae-Yong
77	FW	BRA	Morato

== Match results ==
=== K-League ===
Date Round	Home	Score	Away	Location

5 March 1	Gangwon	0–1	Gyeongnam	Gangneung, Gangwon
15:00 UTC+9		Report	Yoon Bit-Garam 44'	Stadium: Gangneung Stadium; Attendance: 15,497; Referee: Lee Min-Hoo

13 March 2	Gyeongnam	1–0	Ulsan Hyundai	Changwon, Gyeongnam
15:30 UTC+9	Lucio 55'	Report		Stadium: Changwon Football Center; Attendance: 16,749; Referee: Moon Jin-Hee

20 March 3	Daejeon Citizen	2–0	Gyeongnam	Yuseong-gu, Daejeon
15:00 UTC+9	Wagner 48'; Hwang Jae-Hun 74'	Report		Stadium: Daejeon World Cup Stadium; Attendance: 8,209; Referee: Ko Hyung-Jin

3 April 4	Gyeongnam	2–1	Incheon United	Changwon, Gyeongnam
15:00 UTC+9	Yoon Il-Rok 1'; Lucio 62'	Report	Yoo Byung-Soo 22'	Stadium: Changwon Football Center; Attendance: 8,672; Referee: Ko Keum-Bok

9 April 5	Daegu	2–1	Gyeongnam	Buk-gu, Daegu
17:00 UTC+9	Kim Hyun-Sung 29'; Park Jong-Jin (yellow card) 60' (yellow-red card) 61'; Song Chang-Ho 90+2' (pen.)	Report	Ahn Hyun-Sik (red card) 38'; Yoon Bit-Garam 84' (pen.)	Stadium: Daegu Civil Stadium; Attendance: 6,537; Referee: Kim Seong-Ho

17 April 6	Gyeongnam	1–2	Chunnam Dragons	Changwon, Gyeongnam
15:00 UTC+9	Kim In-Han 31'	Report	Índio 73' (pen.), 90+2'	Stadium: Changwon Football Center; Attendance: 7,319; Referee: Ahn Yong-Hee

24 April 7	Suwon Samsung Bluewings	1–2	Gyeongnam	Suwon, Gyeonggi
19:30 UTC+9	Lee Yong-Gi 65' (o.g.)	Report	Han Kyung-In 5'; Kim In-Han 53'	Stadium: Suwon World Cup Stadium; Attendance: 20,315; Referee: Choi Myung-Yong

30 April 8	Gyeongnam	2–2	Seongnam Ilhwa Chunma	Changwon, Gyeongnam
19:00 UTC+9	Lucio 40'; Kim Young-Woo 82'	Report	Lee Yong-Gi 12' (o.g.); Cho Dong-Geon 34' (pen.)	Stadium: Changwon Football Center; Attendance: 2,317; Referee: Yoo Seon-Ho

8 May 9	Gyeongnam	1–0	Gwangju	Geochang, Gyeongnam
19:00 UTC+9	Kim Young-Woo 75'	Report		Stadium: Geochang Sports Park; Attendance: 8,625; Referee: Ryu Hee-Seon

15 May 10	Seoul	3–1	Gyeongnam	Mapo-gu, Seoul
15:00 UTC+9	Dejan 9'; Ko Yo-Han 69', 90'	Report	Kim In-Han 43'	Stadium: Seoul World Cup Stadium; Attendance: 26,008; Referee: Kim Seong-Ho

21 May 11	Gyeongnam	0–1	Sangju Sangmu Phoenix	Changwon, Gyeongnam
19:00 UTC+9		Report	Kim In-Han 81' (o.g.)	Stadium: Changwon Football Center; Attendance: 8,247; Referee: Choi Kwang-Bo

29 May 12	Gyeongnam	1–1	Jeju United	Changwon, Gyeongnam
19:00 UTC+9	DeVere 59'	Report	Jair 29'	Stadium: Changwon Football Center; Attendance: 8,498; Referee: Hong Jin-Ho

11 June 13	Jeonbuk Hyundai Motors	2–0	Gyeongnam	Jeonju, Jeonbuk
19:00 UTC+9	Eninho 27'; Lee Dong-Gook 73'	Report	Jung Da-Hwon (yellow card) 26' (yellow-red card) 62'	Stadium: Jeonju World Cup Stadium; Attendance: 14,115; Referee: Choi Myungyong

18 June 14	Gyeongnam	3–2	Busan I'Park	Changwon, Gyeongnam
19:00 UTC+9	Lee Kyung-Ryul 69'; Lee Hun 84'; Kim Tae-Wook 88'	Report	Yang Dong-Hyun 62'; Han Sang-Woon 74'	Stadium: Changwon Football Center; Attendance: 8,137; Referee: Ko Keumbok

25 June 15	Gyeongnam	2–3	Pohang Steelers	Changwon, Gyeongnam
19:00 UTC+9	Lee Hun 29'; Yoon Il-Rok 64'	Report	Asamoah 23'; Mota 55', 69'	Stadium: Changwon Football Center; Attendance: 1,214; Referee: Yoo Seonho

3 July 16	Ulsan Hyundai	0–0	Gyeongnam	Nam-gu, Ulsan
19:00 UTC+9		Report		Stadium: Munsu Cup Stadium; Attendance: 3,376; Referee: Lee Dong-Jun

9 July 17	Jeju United	2–3	Gyeongnam	Seogwipo, Jeju
19:00 UTC+9	Park Hyun-Beom 41' (pen.); Santos 57'; Kang Joon-Woo (yellow card) 33' (yellow-red card) 77'	Report	Yoon Il-Rok 76'; Yoon Bit-Garam 78'; Kim In-Han 90+1'	Stadium: Jeju World Cup Stadium; Attendance: 6,326; Referee: Kim Sung-Ho

16 July 18	Gyeongnam	7–1	Daejeon Citizen	Changwon, Gyeongnam
19:00 UTC+9	Yoon Bit-Garam 11' (pen.); Lee Hyo-Kyun 15'; Lee Hun 17'; Park Min 42'; DeVere 55'; Jordán 86'; Lucio 89'	Report	Lee Woong-Hee 78'	Stadium: Changwon Football Center; Attendance: 11,256; Referee: Lee Sam-Ho

23 July 19	Incheon United	2–2	Gyeongnam	Seo-gu, Incheon
19:00 UTC+9	Fábio Bahia 72'; Park Jun-Tae 75'	Report	Lee Hyo-Kyun 51'; Jung Dae-Sun 55'	Stadium: Incheon Munhak Stadium; Attendance: 6,768; Referee: Choi Kwang-Bo

6 August 20	Gwangju	0–2	Gyeongnam	Seo-gu, Gwangju
19:00 UTC+9		Report	Seo Sang-Min 5'; Yoon Bit-Garam 69'	Stadium: Gwangju World Cup Stadium; Attendance: 2,874; Referee: Lee Sang-Yong

13 August 21	Gyeongnam	0–2	Suwon Samsung Bluewings	Changwon, Gyeongnam
19:30 UTC+9		Report	Ristić 20'; Kwak Hee-Joo 71'	Stadium: Changwon Football Center; Attendance: 7,809; Referee: Ahn Yong-Hee

20 August 22	Seongnam Ilhwa Chunma	1–1	Gyeongnam FC	Seongnam, Gyeonggi
19:00 UTC+9	Éverton Santos 21'	Report		Stadium: Tancheon Sports Complex; Attendance: 5,195; Referee: Ko Keum-Bok

27 August 23	Pohang Steelers	1–0	Gyeongnam	Pohang, Gyeongbuk
19:00 UTC+9	No Byung-Jun 76'	Report		Stadium: Steelyard Stadium; Attendance: 15,359; Referee: Choi Myung-Yong

11 September 24	Chunnam Dragons	2–0	Gyeongnam	Gwangyang, Jeonnam
19:00 UTC+9	Cornthwaite 59'; Lee Hyun-Seung 85'	Report		Stadium: Gwangyang Stadium; Attendance: 3,479; Referee: Ko Keum-Bok

18 September 25	Gyeongnam	1–3	Jeonbuk Hyundai Motors	Changwon, Gyeongnam
19:00 UTC+9	Kang Seung-Jo 41'	Report	Seo Jung-Jin 20'; Lee Dong-Gook 32' (pen.); Luiz 36'	Stadium: Changwon Football Center; Attendance: 10,536; Referee: Lee Jong-Guk

24 September 26	Gyeongnam	0–0	Gangwon	Miryang, Gyeongnam
19:00 UTC+9		Report	Park Woo-Hyun (yellow card) 26' (yellow-red card) 89'	Stadium: Miryang Stadium; Attendance: 9,036; Referee: Choi Kwang-Bo

2 October 27	Busan I'Park	0–1	Gyeongnam	Seo-gu, Busan
15:00 UTC+9		Report	Roni 16'; Kang Seung-Jo (yellow card) 50' (yellow-red card) 87'	Stadium: Busan Gudeok Stadium; Attendance: 8,691; Referee: Choi Myung-Yong

16 October 28	Gyeongnam	3–0	Daegu	Changwon, Gyeongnam
17:00 UTC+9	Jordán 44', 79'; Yoon Il-Rok 71'	Report	Kim Dae-Yeol (red card) 38'	Stadium: Changwon Football Center; Attendance: 5,138; Referee: Lee Dong-Jun

22 October 29	Sangju Sangmu Phoenix	1–3	Gyeongnam	Sangju, Gyeongbuk
15:00 UTC+9	Yoo Chang-Hyun 84'	Report	Yoon Bit-Garam 30'; Seo Sang-Min 47'; Kim Joo-Young 68'	Stadium: Sangju Stadium; Attendance: 3,245; Referee: Ko Keum-Bok

30 October 30	Gyeongnam	0–3	FC Seoul	Jinju, Gyeongnam
15:00 UTC+9	Jung Da-Hwon (yellow card) 52' (yellow-red card) 68'	Report	Ha Dae-Sung 59', 77', 85'	Stadium: Jinju Stadium; Attendance: 22,468; Referee: Lee Sang-Yong

==== League table ====
Pos	Team	Pld	W	D	L	GF	GA	GD	Pts	Qualification
6	Ulsan Hyundai	30	13	7	10	33	29	+4	46	Qualification for the K League playoffs first round
7	Jeonnam Dragons	30	11	10	9	33	29	+4	43	
8	Gyeongnam FC	30	12	6	12	41	40	+1	42	
9	Jeju United	30	10	10	10	44	45	−1	40	
10	Seongnam Ilhwa Chunma	30	9	8	13	43	47	−4	35	Qualification for the Champions League group stage (Note: Qualified as champions of the FA Cup.)

Source: K League
Rules for classification: 1) Points; 2) Goal difference; 3) Goals scored
Notes:

Pos	Team	Qualification
1	Jeonbuk Hyundai Motors (C)	Qualification for the Champions League group stage
2	Ulsan Hyundai	Qualification for the Champions League group stage
3	Pohang Steelers	Qualification for the Champions League playoff round
4	Suwon Samsung Bluewings	
5	FC Seoul	
6	Busan IPark	

Source: RSSSF
(C) Champions

==== Results summary ====
Overall								Home						Away					
Pld	W	D	L	GF	GA	GD	Pts	W	D	L	GF	GA	GD	W	D	L	GF	GA	GD
30	12	6	12	41	40	+1	42	6	3	5	24	18	+6	6	3	7	17	22	−5

==== Results by round ====
Round	1	2	3	4	5	6	7	8	9	10	11	12	13	14	15	16	17	18	19	20	21	22	23	24	25	26	27	28	29	30
Ground	A	H	A	H	A	H	A	A	H	A	H	H	A	H	H	A	A	H	A	A	H	H	A	A	H	H	A	H	A	H
Result	W	W	L	W	L	L	W	D	W	L	L	D	L	W	L	D	W	W	D	W	L	D	L	L	L	D	W	W	W	L
Position	6	2	8	4	7	9	7	5	4	6	8	8	10	8	12	12	8	6	7	7	8	8	8	8	9	9	9	8	7	8

Updated to match(es) played on 23 October 2011. Source: League Fixtures and Results
A = Away; H = Home; W = Win; D = Draw; L = Loss

=== Korean FA Cup ===
18 May Round of 32	Busan Transportation Corporation	2–1	Gyeongnam	Yeonje-gu, Busan
19:00 UTC+9	Jeon Jae-Hee 23'; Kim Kyung-Choon 87'		Han Kyung-In 67'	Stadium: Busan Gudeok Stadium; Attendance: 459

=== League Cup ===
16 March Group round	Daegu	0–2	Gyeongnam	Buk-gu, Daegu
19:00 UTC+9		Report	Kim Young-Woo 30'; Lucio 70'	Stadium: Daegu Civil Stadium; Attendance: 952; Referee: Kim Sang-Woo

6 April Group round	Seongnam Ilhwa Chunma	0–0	Gyeongnam	Seongnam, Gyeonggi
20:00 UTC+9		Report		Stadium: Tancheon Sports Complex; Attendance: 1,411; Referee: Woo Sang-Il

20 April Group round	Gyeongnam	1–0	Incheon United	Changwon, Gyeongnam
20:00 UTC+9	Kim In-Han 81'	Report		Stadium: Changwon Football Center; Attendance: 1,321; Referee: Kim Sang-Woo

5 May Group round	Gyeongnam	3–0	Daejeon Citizen	Changwon, Gyeongnam
15:00 UTC+9	Han Kyung-In 30'; Yoon Bit-Garam 56'; Lucio 89'	Report		Stadium: Changwon Football Center; Attendance: 11,826; Referee: Lee Min-Hoo

11 May Group round	Gyeongnam	1–2	Pohang Steelers	Changwon, Gyeongnam
15:00 UTC+9	Ahn Hyun-Sik 66'	Report	Kim Gi-Dong 26' (pen.); Mota 79'	Stadium: Changwon Football Center; Attendance: 961; Referee: Lim Won-Taek

29 June Quarterfinal	Gyeongnam	1–0	Seoul	Changwon, Gyeongnam
20:00 UTC+9	Yoon Bit-Garam 26'	Report		Stadium: Changwon Football Center; Attendance: 2,469; Referee: Ahn Yong-Hee

6 July Semifinal	Ulsan Hyundai	4–2	Gyeongnam	Nam-gu, Ulsan
19:00 UTC+9	Kim Shin-Wook 47', 66', 78', 87'	Report	Lee Hyo-Kyun 15'; Lee Dong-Geun 80'; Seo Sang-Min (red card) 90'	Stadium: Munsu Cup Stadium; Attendance: 2,589; Referee: Ko Keum-Bok

== Squad statistics ==
=== Appearances and goals ===
Statistics accurate as of match played 30 October 2011
Numbers in parentheses denote appearances as substitute.

No.	Nat.	Pos.	Name	League		FA Cup		League Cup		Total	
No.	Nat.	Pos.	Name	Apps	Goals	Apps	Goals	Apps	Goals	Apps	Goals
1	KOR	GK	Kim Byung-Ji	30	0	0	0	3	0	33 (0)	0
3	KOR	DF	Park Jae-hong	19 (3)	0	0	0	2	0	21 (3)	0
4	KOR	DF	Kim Joo-Young	4	1	0	0	0	0	4 (0)	1
5	KOR	MF	Kim Tae-Wook	13 (1)	1	0	0	2	0	15 (1)	1
6	AUS	DF	Luke DeVere	30	2	0 (1)	0	3 (1)	0	33 (2)	2
7	KOR	MF	Kang Seung-Jo	9	1	0	0	0	0	9 (0)	1
8	KOR	MF	Yoon Bit-Garam	23 (2)	6	0 (1)	0	5 (2)	2	28 (5)	8
9	COL	FW	Jordán	7 (3)	3	0	0	0	0	7 (3)	3
10	BRA	FW	Roni	7 (3)	1	0	0	0	0	7 (3)	1
11	KOR	FW	Kim In-Han	18 (5)	4	0 (1)	0	3 (3)	1	21 (9)	5
12	KOR	MF	An Sung-Bin	0 (2)	0	0	0	2 (1)	0	2 (3)	0
13	KOR	DF	Lee Hea-Kang	4 (2)	0	0	0	1	0	5 (2)	0
14	KOR	FW	Lee Hun	13 (1)	3	0	0	3 (1)	0	16 (2)	3
15	KOR	DF	Lee Kyung-Ryul	14 (6)	2	1	0	6	0	21 (6)	2
16	KOR	DF	Park Min	5 (3)	1	0	0	0	0	5 (3)	1
17	KOR	DF	Lee Jae-Myung	12 (1)	0	1	0	5	0	18 (1)	0
18	KOR	DF	Jeon Won-Keun	0	0	0	0	0	0	0	0
19	KOR	GK	Lee Jung-Rae	0	0	1	0	4	0	5 (0)	0
20	KOR	DF	Lee Yong-Gi	2 (4)	0	1	0	3	0	6 (4)	0
21	KOR	MF	Seo Sang-Min	13 (6)	2	0	0	0 (2)	0	13 (8)	2
22	KOR	DF	Go Rae-Se	0 (1)	0	0	0	0	0	0 (1)	0
23	KOR	MF	Lee Dong-Geun	0 (2)	0	1	0	0 (1)	1	1 (3)	1
24	KOR	FW	Yoon Il-Rok	13 (8)	4	1	0	5	0	19 (8)	4
25	KOR	MF	Jung Da-Hwon	28	0	1	0	4	0	33 (0)	0
26	KOR	MF	Choi Young-Jun	9 (4)	0	1	0	4	0	14 (4)	0
27	KOR	MF	Sim Jin-Hyung	0	0	0	0	0 (1)	0	0 (1)	0
28	KOR	FW	Lee Hyo-Kyun	9 (3)	2	0	0	1	1	10 (3)	3
29	KOR	MF	Kang Chul-Min	0 (1)	0	0	0	4	0	4 (1)	0
30	KOR	MF	Kim Jin-Hyun	3 (2)	0	0	0	3	0	6 (2)	0
31	KOR	GK	Kim Sun-Kyu	0	0	0	0	0	0	0	0
32	KOR	DF	Kim Jong-Soo	1	0	0	0	0	0	1 (0)	0
33	KOR	FW	Han Kyung-In	10 (8)	1	1	1	2 (3)	1	13 (11)	3
34	KOR	DF	Kim Min-Su	0	0	0	0	0	0	0	0
36	KOR	MF	Kim Jin-soo	0	0	0	0	0	0	0	0
37	KOR	MF	Oh Kwang-Jin	0	0	0	0	0	0	0	0
38	KOR	MF	Park Jin-Soo	0	0	0	0	0	0	0	0
39	KOR	FW	Jung Seung-Yong	1 (2)	0	0	0	1 (1)	0	2 (3)	0
40	KOR	DF	Choi Sung-Yong	0	0	0	0	0	0	0	0
41	KOR	FW	Jung Dae-Sun	2 (9)	1	0	0	0	0	2 (9)	1
55	KOR	DF	Cho Jae-Yong	0	0	0	0	0	0	0	0
77	BRA	FW	Morato	2 (4)	0	0	0	0	0	2 (4)	0
2	KOR	DF	Ahn Hyun-Sik (out)	10	0	0	0	4	1	14 (0)	1
7	KOR	DF	Kim Young-Woo (out)	12 (1)	2	1	0	2 (1)	1	15 (2)	3
9	COL	FW	Mauricio Mendoza (out)	0	0	0	0	1	0	1 (0)	0
10	BRA	FW	Lucio (out)	4 (3)	4	0	0	1 (2)	2	5 (5)	6
18	KOR	MF	Kim You-Sung (out)	0	0	1	0	3 (1)	0	4 (1)	0
35	KOR	MF	Park Chang-Heon (out)	3	0	0	0	0 (1)	0	3 (1)	0

=== Top scorers ===
Rank	Nation	Number	Name	K-League	KFA Cup	League Cup	Total
1	(South Korea)	8	Yoon Bit-Garam	6	0	2	8
2	(Brazil)	10	Lucio	4	0	2	6
3	(South Korea)	11	Kim In-Han	4	0	1	5
4	(South Korea)	24	Yoon Il-Rok	4	0	0	4
5	(Colombia)	9	Jordán	3	0	0	3
=	(South Korea)	14	Lee Hun	3	0	0	3
=	(South Korea)	7	Kim Young-Woo	2	0	1	3
=	(South Korea)	28	Lee Hyo-Kyun	2	0	1	3
=	(South Korea)	33	Han Kyung-In	1	1	1	3
6	(Australia)	6	Luke DeVere	2	0	0	2
=	(South Korea)	15	Lee Kyung-Ryul	2	0	0	2
=	(South Korea)	21	Seo Sang-Min	2	0	0	2
7	(South Korea)	4	Kim Joo-Young	1	0	0	1
=	(South Korea)	5	Kim Tae-Wook	1	0	0	1
=	(South Korea)	7	Kang Seung-Jo	1	0	0	1
=	(Brazil)	10	Roni	1	0	0	1
=	(South Korea)	16	Park Min	1	0	0	1
=	(South Korea)	41	Jung Dae-Sun	1	0	0	1
=	(South Korea)	2	Ahn Hyun-Sik	0	0	1	1
=	(South Korea)	23	Lee Dong-Geun	0	0	1	1
/	/	/	Own Goals	0	0	0	0
/	/	/	TOTALS	41	1	10	52

=== Top assistors ===
Rank	Nation	Number	Name	K-League	KFA Cup	League Cup	Total
1	(South Korea)	8	Yoon Bit-Garam	6	0	1	7
2	(South Korea)	24	Yoon Il-Rok	6	0	0	6
3	(South Korea)	25	Jung Da-Hwon	4	0	0	4
4	(South Korea)	21	Seo Sang-Min	3	0	0	3
=	(South Korea)	7	Kim Young-Woo	2	0	1	3
5	(Colombia)	9	Jordán	2	0	0	2
=	(Brazil)	10	Lucio	1	0	1	2
6	(South Korea)	7	Kang Seung-Jo	1	0	0	1
=	(South Korea)	11	Kim In-Han	1	0	0	1
=	(South Korea)	26	Choi Young-Jun	1	0	0	1
=	(South Korea)	39	Jung Seung-Yong	1	0	0	1
=	(South Korea)	41	Jung Dae-Sun	1	0	0	1
=	(Colombia)	9	Mauricio Mendoza	0	0	1	1
=	(South Korea)	18	Kim You-Sung	0	0	1	1
=	(South Korea)	30	Kim Jin-Hyun	0	0	1	1
/	/	/	TOTALS	29	0	6	35

=== Discipline ===
Position	Nation	Number	Name	K-League		KFA Cup		League Cup		Total	
Position	Nation	Number	Name	Booked	Sent off (straight red)	Booked	Sent off (straight red)	Booked	Sent off (straight red)	Booked	Sent off (straight red)
GK	(South Korea)	1	Kim Byung-Ji	2	0	0	0	0	0	2	0
DF	(South Korea)	2	Ahn Hyun-Sik	4	0	0	0	1	0	5	0
DF	(South Korea)	3	Park Jae-hong	3	0	0	0	1	0	4	0
MF	(South Korea)	5	Kim Tae-Wook	5	0	0	0	0	0	5	0
DF	(Australia)	6	Luke DeVere	2	0	0	0	1	0	3	0
MF	(South Korea)	7	Kim Young-Woo	4	0	1	0	0	0	5	0
MF	(South Korea)	7	Kang Seung-Jo	6	1	0	0	0	0	6	1
MF	(South Korea)	8	Yoon Bit-Garam	9	0	0	0	1	0	10	0
FW	(Colombia)	9	Jordán	2	0	0	0	0	0	2	0
FW	(Brazil)	10	Lucio	2	0	0	0	0	0	2	0
FW	(Brazil)	10	Roni	2	0	0	0	0	0	2	0
FW	(South Korea)	11	Kim In-Han	1	0	0	0	1	0	2	0
FW	(South Korea)	14	Lee Hun	1	0	0	0	0	0	1	0
DF	(South Korea)	15	Lee Kyung-Ryul	3	0	0	0	1	0	4	0
DF	(South Korea)	16	Park Min	3	0	0	0	0	0	3	0
DF	(South Korea)	17	Lee Jae-Myung	1	0	0	0	2	0	3	0
DF	(South Korea)	20	Lee Yong-Gi	3	0	0	0	2	0	5	0
FW	(South Korea)	21	Seo Sang-Min	2	0	0	0	0	1	2	1
FW	(South Korea)	24	Yoon Il-Rok	1	0	0	0	1	0	2	0
MF	(South Korea)	25	Jung Da-Hwon	6	2	0	0	2	0	8	2
MF	(South Korea)	26	Choi Young-Jun	2	0	0	0	1	0	3	0
FW	(South Korea)	28	Lee Hyo-Kyun	2	0	0	0	0	0	2	0
FW	(South Korea)	39	Jung Seung-Yong	1	0	0	0	0	0	1	0
/	/	/	TOTALS	67	3	1	0	14	1	82	4

== Transfer ==
=== In ===
- 1 July 2011 – (Colombia) Jordán – Monagas Sport Club
- 21 July 2011 – (South Korea) Jung Dae-Sun – Ulsan Hyundai FC
- 26 July 2011 – (Brazil) Roni – São Paulo FC
- 28 July 2011 – (South Korea) Jeon Won-Keun – Daegu FC
- 28 July 2011 – (South Korea) Kang Seung-Jo – Jeonbuk Hyundai Motors
- 21 September 2011 – (South Korea) Cho Jae-Yong – Sangju Sangmu Phoenix

=== Out ===
- 3 July 2011 – (South Korea) Kim Young-Woo – Jeonbuk Hyundai Motors
- 6 July 2011 – (South Korea) Yoo Ji-Hoon – Busan I'Park
- 7 July 2011 – (South Korea) Ahn Hyun-Sik – Released (under indictment)
- 7 July 2011 – (South Korea) Park Chang-Heon – Released (under indictment)
- 14 July 2011 – (Colombia) Mauricio Mendoza – Released
- 21 July 2011 – (Brazil) Lúcio – Ulsan Hyundai FC
- 28 July 2011 – (South Korea) Kim You-Sung – Daegu FC
