= 2012 Gyeongnam FC season =

Gyeongnam FC
2012 season
- Chairman: Gyeongsangnam-do provincial governor
- Manager: Choi Jin-Han
- K-League: 11th
- Korean FA Cup: Semifinal
- Top goalscorer: League: Caíque (6); All: Caíque (7)
- Highest home attendance: 5,745 vs Suwon (April 21)
- Lowest home attendance: 1,486 vs Gangwon (June 20)
- Average home league attendance: 3,070 (as of June 20)
Home colours	Away colours	Third colours

The 2012 season was Gyeongnam FC's seventh season in the K-League in South Korea. Gyeongnam FC will be competing in K-League and Korean FA Cup.

== Current squad ==
Note: Flags indicate national team as defined under FIFA eligibility rules; some limited exceptions apply. Players may hold more than one non-FIFA nationality.

No.	Pos.	Nation	Player
1	GK	KOR	Kim Byung-Ji
2	DF	KOR	Kim Min-Hak
3	DF	KOR	Yoon Sin-Young
4	MF	KOR	Cho Jae-Yong
5	DF	KOR	Kang Min-hyuk
6	DF	AUS	Luke DeVere
7	MF	KOR	Kang Seung-Jo (captain)
8	FW	KOR	Jo Jae-Cheol
9	FW	COL	Jordán
10	FW	BRA	Roni
11	FW	KOR	Kim In-Han
12	DF	KOR	Lee Jae-Myung
13	FW	KOR	Choi Hyun-Yeon
14	MF	KOR	Yoo Ho-Joon
15	DF	KOR	Ko Jae-Sung
16	MF	KOR	Jung Da-Hwon
17	FW	KOR	An Sung-Bin
18	FW	BRA	Caíque
19	FW	KOR	Jung Dae-Sun
20	DF	KOR	Lee Yong-Gi
21	MF	KOR	Kim Ji-Woong

No.	Pos.	Nation	Player
22	DF	KOR	Koh Rae-Se
23	MF	KOR	Huh Young-Suk
24	FW	KOR	Yun Il-Rok
25	FW	KOR	Lee Jae-An
26	MF	KOR	Choi Young-Jun
27	DF	KOR	Kim Bo-Sung
28	MF	KOR	Park Jin-Soo
29	MF	KOR	Kang Chul-Min
30	DF	KOR	Oh Byoung-Min
31	GK	KOR	Back Min-Chul
32	DF	KOR	Kim Jong-Soo
33	DF	KOR	Ha In-Ho
34	MF	KOR	Kim Hyun-Gon
35	DF	KOR	Kim Sung-Hyun
36	DF	KOR	Joo In-Bae
37	DF	KOR	Kim Chang-Hoon
38	MF	KOR	Tae Hyun-Chan
39	MF	KOR	Lee Dong-geun
40	GK	KOR	Lee Keun-Pyo
41	GK	KOR	Kim Sea-Joon
42	MF	KOR	Nam Seol-Hyun

=== Out on loan ===
Note: Flags indicate national team as defined under FIFA eligibility rules; some limited exceptions apply. Players may hold more than one non-FIFA nationality.

No.	Pos.	Nation	Player
—	MF	KOR	Hwang Byung-In (to Sangju Sangmu Phoenix for military service)

== Transfer ==
=== In ===
No.	Pos.	Nation	Player
—	MF	KOR	Yoo Ho-Joon (from Busan I'Park)
—	DF	KOR	Kim Min-Hak (Unattached, former Jeonbuk Hyundai Motors)
—	MF	BRA	Caíque (on loan from (Brazil) Vasco da Gama)
—	GK	KOR	Kim Sea-Joon (from Gangwon FC)
—	MF	KOR	Jo Jae-Cheol (from Seongnam Ilhwa Chunma)
—	DF	KOR	Kang Min-hyuk (from Jeju United)
—	DF	KOR	Ko Jae-Sung (from (China) Nanchang Hengyuan)
—	FW	KOR	Lee Jae-An (from FC Seoul)
—	FW	BRA	Roni (loaned from (Brazil) São Paulo B)
—	DF	KOR	Oh Byung-Min (Free agent, former FC Seoul)
—	DF	KOR	Yoon Sin-Young (Free agent, former Daejeon Citizen)

No.	Pos.	Nation	Player
—	MF	KOR	Kim Ji-Woong (from Jeonbuk Hyundai Motors)
—	GK	KOR	Back Min-Chul (from Daegu FC)
—	DF	KOR	Joo In-Bae (drafted)
—	DF	KOR	Ha In-Ho (drafted)
—	MF	KOR	Kim Hyun-Gon (drafted)
^{§}	FW	KOR	~~Lee Wan-Hee~~ (~~drafted from Goyang Kookmin Bank FC~~)
—	GK	KOR	Lee Geun-Pyo (drafted)
—	MF	KOR	Huh Young-Suk (drafted)
—	MF	KOR	Nam Seol-Hyeon (drafted)
—	MF	KOR	Tae Hyun-Chan (drafted)
—	DF	KOR	Kim Bo-Sung (drafted)

Notes

^{§} Gyeongnam decided against signing the player due to an injury.

=== Out ===
No.	Pos.	Nation	Player
3	DF	KOR	Park Jae-hong (released, to (Thailand) Police United)
4	DF	KOR	Kim Joo-Young (to FC Seoul)
8	MF	KOR	Yoon Bit-Garam (to Seongnam Ilhwa Chunma)
10	FW	BRA	Roni (loan return to (Brazil) São Paulo B)
13	DF	KOR	Lee Hea-Kang (contract terminated)
15	DF	KOR	Lee Kyung-Ryul (to Busan I'Park)
16	DF	KOR	Park Min (released, to Gwangju FC)
18	DF	KOR	Jeon Won-Keun (released, to Ulsan Mipo Dockyard)
19	GK	KOR	Lee Jung-Rae (to Gwangju FC)
21	MF	KOR	Seo Sang-Min (to Jeonbuk Hyundai Motors)
27	MF	KOR	Sim Jin-Hyung (contract terminated, to Gimhae City FC)

No.	Pos.	Nation	Player
28	FW	KOR	Lee Hyo-Kyun (contract terminated, to Incheon United)
30	MF	KOR	Kim Jin-Hyun (released)
31	GK	KOR	Kim Sun-Kyu (contract terminated, to Daejeon Citizen)
33	FW	KOR	Han Kyung-In (contract terminated, to Daejeon Citizen)
34	DF	KOR	Kim Min-Su (contract terminated)
36	MF	KOR	Kim Jin-soo (released)
37	MF	KOR	Oh Kwang-Jin (to Gimhae City FC)
39	FW	KOR	Jung Seung-Yong (loan return to FC Seoul)
40	DF	KOR	Choi Sung-Yong (contract terminated)
77	MF	BRA	Morato (released)

== Coaching staff ==
Position	Staff
Manager	(South Korea) Choi Jin-Han
Assistant Manager	(South Korea) Lee Byung-Keun
GK Coach	(South Korea) Yoo Jin-Hoi
Coach	(South Korea) Song Kwang-Hwan
Physical Coach	(Brazil) Ademir
Scouter	(South Korea) Park Dae-Je

Last updated: 27 March 2012
Source: Gyeongnam FC

== Match results ==
=== K-League ===
All times are Korea Standard Time (KST) – UTC+9

Date Round	Home	Score	Away	Location

4 March 1	Gyeongnam	3 – 0	Daejeon	Changwon, Gyeongnam
17:00	Yun Il-Rok 33' (Assist by No.18); Caíque 68' (Assist by No.11); Kim In-Han 33' (Assist by No.18)	Report		Stadium: Changwon Football Center; Attendance: 4,344; Referee: Ko Keum-Bok

11 March 2	Ulsan	2 – 1	Gyeongnam	Nam-gu, Ulsan
17:00	Kwak Tae-Hwi 42'; Maranhão 66'	Report	Lee Jae-An 83' (Assist by No.15)	Stadium: Ulsan Munsu Football Stadium; Attendance: 5,537; Referee: Lee Dong-Jun

17 March 3	Gyeongnam	2 – 3	Sangju	Changwon, Gyeongnam
15:00	Kim In-Han 11' (Assist by No.18); Caíque 84' (Assist by No.15)	Report	Yoo Chang-Hyun 41'; Kim Hyung-Il 56'; Ko Cha-Won 58'	Stadium: Changwon Football Center; Attendance: 2,404; Referee: Kim Sang-Woo

24 March 4	Chunnam	3 – 1	Gyeongnam	Gwangyang, Jeonnam
15:00	Lee Jong-Ho 54'; Son Seol-Min 80'; Shim Dong-Woon 87'	Report	Jo Jae-Cheol 89'	Stadium: Gwangyang Football Stadium; Attendance: 2,813; Referee: Hong Jin-Ho

1 April 5	Incheon	0 – 0	Gyeongnam	Nam-gu, Incheon
15:00		Report	Lee Yong-Gi (red card) 60'	Stadium: Incheon Football Stadium; Attendance: 2,538; Referee: Kim Sung-Ho

8 April 6	Gyeongnam	0 – 2	Jeonbuk	Changwon, Gyeongnam
15:00		Report	Kim Jung-Woo 33'; Lee Dong-Gook 62'	Stadium: Changwon Football Center; Attendance: 3,959; Referee: Kim Dong-Jin

11 April 7	Daegu	2 – 3	Gyeongnam	Suseong-gu, Daegu
15:00	Choi Ho-Jung 42'; Song Je-Heon 90' (pen.)	Report	Jordán 35' (Assist by No.12); Kim Kee-Hee 45' (o.g.); Caíque 83' (pen.)	Stadium: Daegu Stadium; Attendance: 3,655; Referee: Yoo Sun-Ho

15 April 8	Gyeongnam	0 – 2	Gangwon	Changwon, Gyeongnam
15:00		Report	Kim Eun-Jung 28' (pen.); Jung Sung-Min 62'	Stadium: Changwon Football Center; Attendance: 1,762; Referee: Ko Hyung-Jin

21 April 9	Gyeongnam	0 – 0	Suwon	Jinju, Gyeongnam
15:00		Report		Stadium: Jinju Stadium; Attendance: 5,745; Referee: Kim Sang-Woo

29 April 10	Jeju	3 – 1	Gyeongnam	Seogwipo, Jeju
17:00 UTC+9	Song Jin-Hyung 4'; Robert 53'; Jair 62'	Report	Jordán 81'	Stadium: Jeju World Cup Stadium; Attendance: 3,244; Referee: Moon Jin-Hee

5 May 11	Busan	1 – 0	Gyeongnam	Yeonje-gu, Busan
15:00	Bang Seung-Hwan 38'	Report		Stadium: Busan Asiad Stadium; Attendance: 4,401; Referee: Choi Myung-Yong

12 May 12	Gyeongnam	0 – 1	Seoul	Changwon, Gyeongnam
17:00		Report	Damjanović 90+1'	Stadium: Changwon Football Center; Attendance: 3,193; Referee: Song Min-Seok

20 May 13	Gyeongnam	2 – 0	Seongnam	Changwon, Gyeongnam
17:00	Caíque 53'; Jo Jae-Cheol 81' (Assist by No.12)	Report		Stadium: Changwon Football Center; Attendance: 2,766; Referee: Kim Wan-Tae

26 May 14	Pohang	0 – 1	Gyeongnam	Pohang, Gyeongbuk
15:00		Report	Yun Il-Rok 79'	Stadium: Pohang Steel Yard; Attendance: 7,759; Referee: An Yong-Hee

9 June 22	Seongnam	2 – 0	Gyeongnam	Seongnam, Gyeonggi
19:00	Jeon Hyun-Cheol 30'; Jovančić 89'	Report	Kim Jong-Soo (yellow card) 29' (yellow-red card) 58'	Stadium: Tancheon Sports Complex; Attendance: 3,765; Referee: Choi Myung-Yong

14 June 15	Gwangju	0 – 1	Gyeongnam	Seo-gu, Gwangju
19:30		Report	Caíque 57' (Assist by No.7)	Stadium: Gwangju World Cup Stadium; Attendance: 1,566; Referee: Kim Sung-Ho

17 June 16	Gyeongnam	3 – 2	Ulsan	Changwon, Gyeongnam
19:00	Kang Seung-Jo 31' (Assist by No.18); Caíque 76' (Assist by No.5); Kim In-Han 80' (Assist by No.24)	Report	Maranhão 47'; Kim Shin-Wook 69'	Stadium: Changwon Football Center; Attendance: 2,471; Referee: Lee Jong-Guk

24 June 17	Jeonbuk	5 – 3	Gyeongnam	Jeonju, Jeonbuk
17:00	Lee Dong-Gook 45', 78' (pen.), 80'; Eninho 61' (pen.); Seo Sang-Min 90+3'	Report(English); Report(Korean)	An Sung-Bin 64'; Ko Jae-Sung 82' (Assist by No.8); Kim Ji-Woong 85'	Stadium: Jeonju World Cup Stadium; Attendance: 10,777; Referee: Yoo Sun-Ho

27 June 18	Gangwon	0 – 3	Gyeongnam	Chuncheon, Gangwon
19:30		Report	Kang Seung-Jo 23' (Assist by No.6); Yun Il-Rok 56' (Assist by No.26); Caíque 63' (Assist by No.12)	Stadium: Chuncheon Stadium; Attendance: 1,309; Referee: Kim Wan-Tae

30 June 19	Gyeongnam	0 – 0	Incheon	Changwon, Gyeongnam
17:00		Report(Kor); Report(Eng)	Kim Nam-Il (yellow card) 23'; Lee Yoon-Pyo (yellow card) 44'; Han Kyo-Won (yellow card) 79'	Stadium: Changwon Football Center; Attendance: 2,122; Referee: Ko Keum-Bok

==== League table ====
Pos	Team	Pld	W	D	L	GF	GA	GD	Pts
6	Jeju United	44	16	15	13	71	56	+15	63
7	Busan IPark	44	13	14	17	40	51	−11	53
8	Gyeongnam FC	44	14	8	22	50	60	−10	50
9	Incheon United	44	17	16	11	46	40	+6	67
10	Daegu FC	44	16	13	15	55	56	−1	61

Source: K League
Rules for classification: 1) Points; 2) Goal difference; 3) Goals scored.

==== Results summary ====
Overall								Home						Away					
Pld	W	D	L	GF	GA	GD	Pts	W	D	L	GF	GA	GD	W	D	L	GF	GA	GD
19	7	2	10	24	28	−4	23	3	1	4	10	10	0	4	1	6	14	18	−4

==== Results by round ====
Round	1	2	3	4	5	6	7	8	9	10	11	12	13	14	15	16	17	18	19	20	21	22	23	24	25	26	27	28	29	30	31	32	33	34	35	36	37	38	39	40	41	42	43	44
Ground	H	A	H	A	A	H	A	H	H	A	A	H	H	A	A	A	H	A	A																									
Result	W	L	L	L	D	L	W	L	D	L	L	L	W	W	L	W	W	L	W																									
Position	1	8	10	13	13	13	11	14	13	14	14	14	13	11	12	11	11	11	9																									

Updated to match(es) played on 28 June 2012. Source: League Fixtures and Results
A = Away; H = Home; W = Win; D = Draw; L = Loss

=== Korean FA Cup ===
23 May Round of 32	Busan Transportation Corp.	2 – 2 (a.e.t.) (4 – 5 p)	Gyeongnam FC	Seo-gu, Busan
19:00 KST	Kim Kyung-Choon 37'; Cha Chul-Ho 108'		Caíque 45'; Kim In-Han 98'	Stadium: Busan Gudeok Stadium; Attendance: 800; Referee: Song Min-Seok
	Penalties
	Kwon Yong-Hyeok (penalty scored); Park Hyuk-Soon (penalty scored); Kang Jin-Kyu (penalty missed); Ju Ki-Ho (penalty missed); Park Seung-Min (penalty scored); Yoon Tae-Hyeon (penalty scored); Kim Hyun-Soo (penalty missed)		(penalty scored) Caíque; (penalty scored) Jo Jae-Cheol; (penalty missed) Kim In-Han; (penalty scored) Choi Hyun-Yeon; (penalty missed) Kang Seung-Jo; (penalty scored) Kang Min-hyuk; (penalty scored) Kim Byung-Ji

20 June Round of 16	Gyeongnam FC	1 – 0	Gangwon FC	Changwon, Gyeongnam
19:30 KST	Yun Il-Rok 26' (Assist by No.18); Yun Il-Rok (yellow card) 30' (yellow-red card) 66'		Jung Sung-Min (yellow card) 19' (yellow-red card) 36'	Stadium: Changwon Football Center, Changwon; Attendance: 1,486

1 August Quarterfinal	Gyeongnam	1 – 1 (a.e.t.) (4 – 2 p)	Suwon	Changwon, Gyeongnam
19:30 KST	Kang Seung-Jo 68'	Report	Éverton 4'	Stadium: Changwon Football Center; Attendance: 1,274
	Penalties
	Caíque (penalty scored); Luke DeVere (penalty scored); Lee Jae-An (penalty scored); Choi Hyun-Yeon (penalty scored)		(penalty missed) Stevo; (penalty scored) Park Hyun-Beom; (penalty scored) Choi Jae-Soo; (penalty missed) Cho Dong-Geon

== Squad statistics ==
=== Appearances ===
Statistics accurate as of match played 27 June 2012

No.	Nat.	Pos.	Name	League		FA Cup		Appearances		Goals
No.	Nat.	Pos.	Name	Apps	Goals	Apps	Goals	App (sub)	Total	Goals
1	(South Korea)	GK	Kim Byung-Ji	18	0	2	0	20 (0)	20	0
2	(South Korea)	DF	Kim Min-Hak	0	0	0	0	0	0	0
3	(South Korea)	DF	Yoon Sin-Young	8	0	2	0	10 (0)	10	0
4	(South Korea)	MF	Cho Jae-Yong	1 (2)	0	0	0	1 (2)	3	0
5	(South Korea)	DF	Kang Min-hyuk	18	0	2	0	20 (0)	20	0
6	(Australia)	DF	Luke DeVere	12	0	1	0	13 (0)	13	0
7	(South Korea)	MF	Kang Seung-Jo	16	2	1 (1)	0	17 (1)	18	2
8	(South Korea)	FW	Jo Jae-Cheol	7 (7)	2	0 (1)	0	7 (8)	15	2
9	(Colombia)	FW	Jordán	12 (4)	2	1	0	13 (4)	17	2
10	(Brazil)	FW	Roni	1 (5)	0	0	0	1 (5)	6	0
11	(South Korea)	FW	Kim In-Han	13 (3)	3	1 (1)	1	14 (4)	18	4
12	(South Korea)	DF	Lee Jae-Myung	12	0	2	0	14 (0)	14	0
13	(South Korea)	FW	Choi Hyun-Yeon	3 (2)	0	0	0	3 (2)	5	0
14	(South Korea)	MF	Yoo Ho-Joon	5 (4)	0	1	0	6 (4)	10	0
15	(South Korea)	DF	Ko Jae-Sung	9 (2)	1	0	0	9 (2)	11	1
16	(South Korea)	MF	Jung Da-Hwon	14	0	2	0	16 (0)	16	0
17	(South Korea)	FW	An Sung-Bin	1 (5)	1	0	0	1 (5)	6	1
18	(Brazil)	FW	Caíque	18	7	2	1	20 (0)	20	8
19	(South Korea)	MF	Jung Dae-Sun	0	0	0	0	0	0	0
20	(South Korea)	DF	Lee Yong-Gi	5 (2)	0	0	0	5 (2)	7	0
21	(South Korea)	MF	Kim Ji-Woong	0 (2)	1	0	0	0 (2)	2	1
22	(South Korea)	DF	Koh Rae-Se	0	0	0	0	0	0	0
23	(South Korea)	MF	Huh Young-Suk	0	0	0	0	0	0	0
24	(South Korea)	FW	Yun Il-Rok	14 (4)	3	2	1	16 (4)	20	4
25	(South Korea)	FW	Lee Jae-An	6 (6)	1	0 (1)	0	6 (7)	13	1
26	(South Korea)	MF	Choi Young-Jun	9 (2)	0	2	0	11 (2)	13	0
27	(South Korea)	DF	Kim Bo-Sung	0 (2)	0	0	0	0 (2)	2	0
28	(South Korea)	MF	Park Jin-Soo	0	0	0	0	0	0	0
29	(South Korea)	MF	Kang Chul-Min	0	0	0	0	0	0	0
30	(South Korea)	DF	Oh Byoung-Min	0	0	0	0	0	0	0
31	(South Korea)	GK	Back Min-Chul	1	0	0	0	1 (0)	1	0
32	(South Korea)	DF	Kim Jong-Soo	6 (1)	0	1 (1)	0	7 (2)	9	0
33	(South Korea)	DF	Ha In-Ho	0	0	0	0	0	0	0
34	(South Korea)	MF	Kim Hyun-Gon	0	0	0	0	0	0	0
35	(South Korea)	DF	Kim Sung-Hyun	0	0	0	0	0	0	0
36	(South Korea)	DF	Joo In-Bae	0 (1)	0	0	0	0 (1)	1	0
37	(South Korea)	DF	Kim Chang-Hoon	0	0	0	0	0	0	0
38	(South Korea)	MF	Tae Hyun-Chan	0	0	0	0	0	0	0
39	(South Korea)	MF	Lee Dong-geun	0	0	0	0	0	0	0
40	(South Korea)	GK	Lee Keun-Pyo	0	0	0	0	0	0	0
41	(South Korea)	GK	Kim Se-Joon	0	0	0	0	0	0	0
42	(South Korea)	MF	Nam Seol-Hyun	0	0	0	0	0	0	0

=== Goals and assists ===
Rank	Nation	Number	Name	K-League		KFA Cup		Sum		Total
Rank	Nation	Number	Name	Goals	Assists	Goals	Assists	Goals	Assists	Total
1	(Brazil)	18	Caíque	7	4	1	1	8	5	13
2	(South Korea)	11	Kim In-Han	3	1	1	0	4	1	5
3	(South Korea)	24	Yun Il-Rok	3	1	1	0	4	1	5
4	(South Korea)	7	Kang Seung-Jo	2	1	0	0	2	1	3
=	(South Korea)	8	Jo Jae-Cheol	2	1	0	0	2	1	3
=	(South Korea)	15	Ko Jae-Sung	1	2	0	0	1	2	3
=	(South Korea)	12	Lee Jae-Myung	0	3	0	0	0	3	3
5	(Colombia)	9	Jordán	2	0	0	0	2	0	2
6	(South Korea)	17	An Sung-Bin	1	0	0	0	1	0	1
=	(South Korea)	21	Kim Ji-Woong	1	0	0	0	1	0	1
=	(South Korea)	25	Lee Jae-An	1	0	0	0	1	0	1
=	(South Korea)	5	Kang Min-hyuk	0	1	0	0	0	1	1
=	(Australia)	6	Luke DeVere	0	1	0	0	0	1	1
=	(South Korea)	26	Choi Young-Jun	0	1	0	0	0	1	1
/	/	/	Own Goals	1	-	0	-	1	-	1
/	/	/	TOTALS	24	16	3	1	27	17	

=== Discipline ===
Position	Nation	Number	Name	K-League		KFA Cup		Total	
Position	Nation	Number	Name	Yellow card	Red card	Yellow card	Red card	Yellow card	Red card
DF	(South Korea)	3	Yoon Sin-Young	3	0	0	0	3	0
DF	(South Korea)	4	Cho Jae-Yong	1	0	0	0	1	0
DF	(South Korea)	5	Kang Min-hyuk	2	0	0	0	2	0
DF	(Australia)	6	Luke DeVere	3	0	0	0	3	0
MF	(South Korea)	7	Kang Seung-Jo	3	0	1	0	4	0
FW	(South Korea)	8	Jo Jae-Cheol	2	0	0	0	2	0
FW	(Colombia)	9	Jordán	1	0	1	0	2	0
FW	(Brazil)	10	Roni	1	0	0	0	1	0
FW	(South Korea)	11	Kim In-Han	2	0	0	0	2	0
DF	(South Korea)	12	Lee Jae-Myung	1	0	0	0	1	0
MF	(South Korea)	14	Yoo Ho-Joon	1	0	0	0	1	0
DF	(South Korea)	15	Ko Jae-Sung	4	0	0	0	4	0
MF	(South Korea)	16	Jung Da-Hwon	1	0	0	0	1	0
FW	(Brazil)	18	Caíque	3	0	0	0	3	0
DF	(South Korea)	20	Lee Yong-Gi	2	1	0	0	2	1
FW	(South Korea)	24	Yun Il-Rok	2	0	3	1	5	1
FW	(South Korea)	25	Lee Jae-An	1	0	0	0	1	0
MF	(South Korea)	26	Choi Young-Jun	1	0	0	0	1	0
DF	(South Korea)	27	Kim Bo-Sung	1	0	0	0	1	0
DF	(South Korea)	32	Kim Jong-Soo	3	1	0	0	3	1
/	/	/	TOTALS	37	2	5	1	42	3
