= 2010 Gyeongnam FC season =

Gyeongnam FC
2010 season
- Chairman: Kim Doo-kwan (governor)
- Manager: Kim Kwi-Hwa (caretaker)
- K-League: 6th
- Korean FA Cup: Round of 16
- League Cup: Semifinal
- Top goalscorer: League: Lucio (13 goals); All: Lucio (19 goals)
- Highest home attendance: 25,980 vs Chunnam (21 August)
- Lowest home attendance: 5,106 vs Jeju (14 July)
- Average home league attendance: 11,066
Home colours	Away colours

The 2010 season was Gyeongnam FC's fifth season in the K-League in South Korea. Gyeongnam FC is competing in K-League, League Cup and Korean FA Cup.

== Current squad ==
Note: Flags indicate national team as defined under FIFA eligibility rules; some limited exceptions apply. Players may hold more than one non-FIFA nationality.

No.	Pos.	Nation	Player
1	GK	KOR	Kim Byung-Ji
2	DF	KOR	Yeon Ki-Sung
3	DF	KOR	Lee Kyung-Ryul
4	DF	KOR	Kim Ju-Young
5	MF	KOR	Kim Tae-Wook
6	DF	KOR	Kim In-Han
7	FW	BRA	Marcinho
8	MF	KOR	Yoon Bit-Garam
9	MF	KOR	Lee Yong-Rae
10	FW	BRA	Lucio
11	FW	BRA	Camilo
12	FW	KOR	An Sung-Bin
13	FW	KOR	Yang Sang-Jun
15	DF	KOR	Yoo Ji-Hoon
16	FW	KOR	Park Jong-Yoon
17	MF	KOR	Lee Ji-Nam
18	FW	KOR	Seo Young-Deok
19	MF	KOR	Lee Jong-hyun
20	FW	KOR	Kim Dong-Hyo
21	GK	KOR	Lee Jung-Rae
22	MF	KOR	Seo Sang-Min
23	FW	KOR	Kim Dong-Chan
24	MF	KOR	Kim Young-Woo

No.	Pos.	Nation	Player
25	MF	KOR	Park Tae-Woong
26	FW	KOR	Lee Hun
27	MF	KOR	Kim Dong-Hee
28	DF	KOR	Jeon Jun-Hyung
29	DF	KOR	Lee Hea-Kang
30	MF	KOR	Kim Jin-Hyun
31	GK	KOR	Kim Sun-Kyu
32	DF	KOR	Kim Jong-Soo
33	MF	KOR	An Sang-Hyun (on loan from FC Seoul)
34	MF	KOR	Park Sung-Jae
35	DF	KOR	Park Min
36	FW	KOR	Lee Jae-Il
37	MF	KOR	Baek Soo-Hyun
38	DF	KOR	Lee Yong-Gi
39	MF	KOR	Hwang Byung-In
40	MF	KOR	In Joon-Yeon
41	GK	KOR	Park Jun-Hyuk
42	FW	KOR	Choi Won-Woo
43	MF	KOR	Choi Joon
44	DF	KOR	Lee Jae-Myung
45	MF	KOR	Lee Chang-Ho
46	MF	KOR	Kim Yoo-Sung
47	DF	KOR	Kim Jin-hee

== K-League ==
Date	Opponents	H / A	Result F – A	Scorers	Attendance	League position
27 February	Ulsan Hyundai FC	A	0–1		8,376	10th
7 March	Daejeon Citizen	A	3–0	Lucio 32', 46', Seo Sang-Min 62'	3,449	7th
14 March	Jeju United FC	H	1–1	Lucio 37'	11,982	7th
21 March	Chunnam Dragons	A	1–1	Lee Hun 90+3'	9,525	11th
28 March	Suwon Samsung Bluewings	H	2–1	Lucio 38', 50'	12,934	6th
3 April	Pohang Steelers	H	3–1	Lucio 5', 85', Jeon Jun-Hyung 75'	12,458	3rd
11 April	Gangwon FC	A	2–1	Lucio 28', Kim Tae-Wook 54'	4,518	3rd
18 April	Seongnam Ilhwa Chunma	A	2–1	Kim Tae-Wook 68', Lucio 88'	5,679	2nd
25 April	FC Seoul	H	1–0	Kim Young-Woo 90'	14,259	1st
2 May	Jeonbuk Hyundai Motors	A	1–1	Kim Dong-Chan 74'	29,056	1st
5 May	Busan I'Park	H	0–1		16,245	2nd
17 July	Gwangju Sangmu FC	H	1–0	Lucio 57'	10,458	4th
25 July	Daegu FC	A	1–1	Lee Yong-Rae 80'	2,213	5th
31 July	Incheon United	H	3–2	Kim In-Han 4', 64', Yoon Bit-Garam 30'	9,012	4th
8 August	Busan I'Park	A	2–1	Lee Yong-Rae 19', Yoon Bit-Garam 73'	5,252	3rd
14 August	Jeonbuk Hyundai Motors	H	3–2	Kim In-Han 31', Kim Dong-Chan 61', Yoon Bit-Garam 61'	11,254	1st
21 August	Chunnam Dragons	H	1–1	Lee Yong-Rae 68'	25,980	1st
28 August	Gwangju Sangmu FC	A	1–1	Kim In-Han 48'	1,255	3rd
11 September	Ulsan Hyundai FC	H	0–1		9,816	5th
18 September	Suwon Samsung Bluewings	A	2–0	Kim Young-Woo 70', Lee Yong-Rae 73'	24,157	3rd
25 September	Daegu FC	H	1–0	Yoon Bit-Garam 20'	10,875	3rd
3 October	Jeju United FC	A	2–3	Yoon Bit-Garam 12', Lucio 17'	13,594	3rd
9 October	FC Seoul	A	2–3	Seo Sang-Min 2', Kim In-Han 88'	31,122	4th
16 October	Gangwon FC	H	1–1	Seo Sang-Min 61'	10,123	4th
27 October	Incheon United	A	2–2	Lee Ji-Nam 88', Yoon Bit-Garam 90+1'	3,127	5th
31 October	Daejeon Citizen	H	1–0	Lucio 36'	8,125	5th
3 November	Pohang Steelers	A	0–3		14,286	6th
7 November	Seongnam Ilhwa Chunma	H	2–2	Seo Sang-Min 2', Lucio 90+5'(pen)	11,496	6th

Pos	Team	Pld	W	D	L	GF	GA	GD	Pts	Qualification
4	Ulsan Hyundai	28	15	5	8	47	30	+17	50	Qualification for the playoffs first round
5	Seongnam Ilhwa Chunma	28	13	9	6	46	26	+20	48	Qualification for the playoffs first round
6	Gyeongnam FC	28	13	9	6	41	32	+9	48	Qualification for the playoffs first round
7	Suwon Samsung Bluewings	28	12	5	11	39	44	−5	41	Qualification for the Champions League (Note: Qualified as champions of the FA Cup.)
8	Busan IPark	28	8	9	11	36	37	−1	33	

Source: K League (in Korean)
Rules for classification: 1) Points; 2) Goal difference; 3) Goals scored
Notes:

Pos	Team	Qualification
1	FC Seoul (C)	Qualification for the Champions League
2	Jeju United	Qualification for the Champions League
3	Jeonbuk Hyundai Motors	Qualification for the Champions League
4	Seongnam Ilhwa Chunma	
5	Ulsan Hyundai	
6	Gyeongnam FC	

Source: RSSSF
(C) Champions

=== Championship ===
Date	Round	Opponents	H / A	Result F – A	Scorers	Attendance
20 November	First round	Jeonbuk Hyundai Motors	A	0–2		18,525

== Korean FA Cup ==
Date	Round	Opponents	H / A	Result F – A	Scorers	Attendance
21 April 2010	Round of 32	Changwon City FC	A	3–2	Kim Dong-Chan 10', Lee Hun 23', Lucio 61'	450
21 July 2010	Round of 16	Chunnam Dragons	H	4–7	Kim Young-Woo 26', Lucio 43', 68', 90+3'	5,329

== League Cup ==
=== Group stage ===
Date	Opponents	H / A	Result F – A	Scorers	Attendance	Group position
22 May	Jeonbuk Hyundai Motors	A	1–2	Ahn Sung-Bin 59'	4,491	5th
29 May	Chunnam Dragons	H	1–0	Yoon Bit-Garam 36'	5,816	4th
2 June	Suwon Samsung Bluewings	H	4–1	Lucio 9', Yoon Bit-Garam 80', Kim In-Han 87', 90+2'	7,914	2nd
6 June	Gangwon FC	A	2–1	Jeon Jun-Hyung 20', Yoon Bit-Garam 79'	3,651	2nd

Pos	Team	Pld	W	D	L	GF	GA	GD	Pts	JHM	GNM	SSB	JND	GWN
1	Jeonbuk Hyundai Motors	4	3	1	0	10	4	+6	10	—	2–1	—	1–1	—
2	Gyeongnam FC	4	3	0	1	8	4	+4	9	—	—	4–1	1–0	—
3	Suwon Samsung Bluewings	4	2	0	2	7	9	−2	6	1–3	—	—	—	2–0
4	Jeonnam Dragons	4	1	1	2	6	5	+1	4	—	—	2–3	—	3–0
5	Gangwon FC	4	0	0	4	2	11	−9	0	1–4	1–2	—	—	—

Source: RSSSF

=== Knockout stage ===
Date	Round	Opponents	H / A	Result F – A	Scorers	Attendance
14 July	Quarterfinal	Jeju United FC	H	1–1 (AET, 4–3p)	Lucio 90'	5,106
28 July	Semifinal	Jeonbuk Hyundai Motors	A	1–2	Own goal 81'	7,267

== Squad statistics ==
=== Appearances and goals ===
Statistics accurate as of match played 20 November 2010

No.	Nat.	Pos.	Name	League		FA Cup		League Cup		Appearances		Goals
No.	Nat.	Pos.	Name	Apps	Goals	Apps	Goals	Apps	Goals	App (sub)	Total	Goals
1	(South Korea)	GK	Kim Byung-Ji	29	0	2	0	6	0	37 (0)	37	0
2	(South Korea)	DF	Yeon Ki-Sung	0	0	0	0	0	0	0	0	0
3	(South Korea)	DF	Lee Kyung-Ryul	5	0	0	0	1	0	6 (0)	6	0
4	(South Korea)	DF	Kim Joo-Young	24	0	2	0	6	0	32 (0)	32	0
5	(South Korea)	MF	Kim Tae-Wook	26	2	2	0	5 (1)	0	33 (1)	34	2
6	(South Korea)	MF	Kim In-Han	8 (10)	5	0	0	2 (3)	2	10 (13)	23	7
7	(Brazil)	FW	Marcinho	1 (2)	0	0 (1)	0	0	0	1 (3)	4	0
8	(South Korea)	MF	Yoon Bit-Garam	21 (3)	6	2	0	5	3	28 (3)	31	9
9	(South Korea)	MF	Lee Yong-Rae	27	4	1	0	3 (2)	0	31 (2)	33	4
10	(Brazil)	FW	Lucio	26 (2)	13	2	4	3 (1)	2	31 (3)	34	19
11	(Brazil)	FW	Camilo	3 (4)	0	0 (1)	0	2	0	5 (5)	10	0
12	(South Korea)	FW	Ahn Sung-Bin	0 (7)	0	0	0	0 (1)	1	0 (8)	8	1
13	(South Korea)	FW	Yang Sang-Joon	1 (2)	0	0 (1)	0	1	0	2 (3)	5	0
15	(South Korea)	DF	Yoo Ji-Hoon	1 (1)	0	0	0	0	0	1 (1)	2	0
16	(South Korea)	FW	Park Jong-Yoon	3	0	0	0	0	0	3 (0)	3	0
17	(South Korea)	DF	Lee Ji-Nam	14 (6)	1	0	0	3	0	17 (6)	23	1
18	(South Korea)	FW	Seo Young-Deok	0	0	0	0	0	0	0	0	0
19	(South Korea)	MF	Lee Jong-hyun	0	0	0	0	0	0	0	0	0
20	(South Korea)	FW	Kim Dong-Hyo	0	0	0	0	0	0	0	0	0
21	(South Korea)	GK	Lee Jung-Rae	0	0	0	0	0	0	0	0	0
22	(South Korea)	MF	Seo Sang-Min	21 (5)	4	1 (1)	0	5 (1)	0	27 (7)	34	4
23	(South Korea)	FW	Kim Dong-Chan	14 (3)	2	2	1	2 (2)	0	18 (5)	23	3
24	(South Korea)	MF	Kim Young-Woo	26	2	2	1	1 (1)	0	29 (1)	30	3
25	(South Korea)	DF	Park Tae-Woong	0 (1)	0	0	0	1	0	1 (1)	2	0
26	(South Korea)	FW	Lee Hun	9 (8)	1	1	1	4 (2)	0	14 (10)	24	2
27	(South Korea)	MF	Kim Dong-Hee	0	0	0	0	0	0	0	0	0
28	(South Korea)	DF	Jeon Jun-Hyung	14 (3)	1	2	0	6	1	22 (3)	25	2
29	(South Korea)	DF	Lee Hye-Kang	1 (3)	0	0	0	0	0	1 (3)	4	0
30	(South Korea)	MF	Kim Jin-Hyun	2 (7)	0	0	0	1 (2)	0	3 (9)	12	0
31	(South Korea)	GK	Kim Sun-Kyu	0	0	0	0	0	0	0	0	0
32	(South Korea)	DF	Kim Jong-Soo	4 (2)	0	0	0	0 (1)	0	4 (3)	7	0
33	(South Korea)	MF	Ahn Sang-Hyun	14 (5)	0	1 (1)	0	5	0	20 (6)	26	0
34	(South Korea)	MF	Park Sung-Jae	0	0	0	0	0	0	0	0	0
35	(South Korea)	DF	Park Min	3	0	0	0	0 (1)	0	3 (1)	4	0
36	(South Korea)	FW	Lee Jae-Il	0	0	0	0	0	0	0	0	0
37	(South Korea)	MF	Baek Soo-Hyun	0	0	0	0	1	0	1 (0)	1	0
38	(South Korea)	DF	Lee Yong-Gi	13 (4)	0	2	0	3	0	18 (4)	22	0
39	(South Korea)	MF	Hwang Byung-In	0	0	0	0	0	0	0	0	0
40	(South Korea)	MF	In Joon-Yeon	0	0	0	0	0	0	0	0	0
41	(South Korea)	GK	Park Joon-Hyuk	0	0	0	0	0	0	0	0	0
42	(South Korea)	FW	Choi Won-Woo	0	0	0	0	0 (1)	0	0 (1)	1	0
43	(South Korea)	MF	Choi Joon	0	0	0	0	0	0	0	0	0
44	(South Korea)	DF	Lee Jae-Myung	7 (2)	0	0	0	0	0	7 (2)	9	0
45	(South Korea)	MF	Lee Chang-ho	0	0	0	0	0	0	0	0	0
46	(South Korea)	MF	Kim Yoo-Sung	2 (1)	0	0	0	0	0	2 (1)	3	0
47	(South Korea)	DF	Kim Jin-hee	0	0	0	0	0	0	0	0	0
7	(Brazil)	FW	Marcelo (out)	0 (4)	0	0	0	0	0	0 (4)	4	0
11	(Ghana)	FW	Alex Asamoah (out)	0 (2)	0	0 (1)	0	0	0	0 (3)	3	0
19	(South Korea)	MF	Jung Myung-O (out)	0	0	0	0	0 (1)	0	0 (1)	1	0

=== Top scorers ===
Position	Nation	Number	Name	K-League	KFA Cup	League Cup	Total
1	(Brazil)	10	Lucio	13	4	2	19
2	(South Korea)	8	Yoon Bit-Garam	6	0	3	9
3	(South Korea)	6	Kim In-Han	5	0	2	7
4	(South Korea)	9	Lee Yong-Rae	4	0	0	4
=	(South Korea)	22	Seo Sang-Min	4	0	0	4
5	(South Korea)	23	Kim Dong-Chan	2	1	0	3
=	(South Korea)	24	Kim Young-Woo	2	1	0	3
6	(South Korea)	5	Kim Tae-Wook	2	0	0	2
=	(South Korea)	26	Lee Hun	1	1	0	2
=	(South Korea)	28	Jeon Jun-Hyung	1	0	1	2
7	(South Korea)	17	Lee Ji-Nam	1	0	0	1
=	(South Korea)	12	Ahn Sung-Bin	0	0	1	1
/	/	/	Own Goals	0	0	1	1
			TOTALS	41	7	10	58

=== Discipline ===
Position	Nation	Number	Name	K-League		KFA Cup		League Cup		Total	
Position	Nation	Number	Name	Booked	Sent off (straight red)	Booked	Sent off (straight red)	Booked	Sent off (straight red)	Booked	Sent off (straight red)
GK	(South Korea)	1	Kim Byung-Ji	1	0	0	0	1	0	2	0
DF	(South Korea)	3	Lee Kyung-Ryul	1	0	0	0	0	0	1	0
DF	(South Korea)	4	Kim Joo-Young	3	0	0	0	1	0	4	0
MF	(South Korea)	5	Kim Tae-Wook	2	0	0	0	1	0	3	0
MF	(South Korea)	6	Kim In-Han	2	0	0	0	0	0	2	0
MF	(South Korea)	9	Lee Yong-Rae	4	0	0	0	0	0	4	0
FW	(Brazil)	10	Lucio	5	0	0	0	0	0	5	0
FW	(Ghana)	11	Alex Asamoah	1	0	0	0	0	0	1	0
FW	(Brazil)	11	Camilo	0	0	0	0	1	0	1	0
FW	(South Korea)	12	Ahn Sung-Bin	1	0	0	0	0	0	1	0
MF	(South Korea)	17	Lee Ji-Nam	5	1	0	0	2	1	7	2
MF	(South Korea)	22	Seo Sang-Min	3	0	0	0	2	0	5	0
FW	(South Korea)	23	Kim Dong-Chan	0	0	0	0	2	0	2	0
FW	(South Korea)	24	Kim Young-Woo	5	0	1	0	1	0	7	0
MF	(South Korea)	25	Park Tae-Woong	0	0	0	0	1	0	1	0
FW	(South Korea)	26	Lee Hun	0	0	0	0	1	0	1	0
DF	(South Korea)	28	Jeon Jun-Hyung	3	0	0	0	2	0	5	0
DF	(South Korea)	29	Lee Hye-Kang	1	0	0	0	0	0	1	0
MF	(South Korea)	30	Kim Jin-Hyun	1	0	0	0	0	0	1	0
DF	(South Korea)	32	Kim Jong-Soo	1	0	0	0	0	0	1	0
FW	(South Korea)	33	Ahn Sang-Hyun	4	1	1	0	1	0	6	1
DF	(South Korea)	38	Lee Yong-Gi	3	0	0	0	4	1	7	1
DF	(South Korea)	44	Lee Jae-Myung	1	0	0	0	0	0	1	0
/	/	/	TOTALS	47	2	2	0	20	2	69	4
