= Dong-geun =

- Hangul: 동근
- RR: Donggeun
- MR: Tonggŭn
- IPA: [toŋɡɯn]

Dong-geun, also spelled Dong-keun, is a Korean given name.

People with this name include:

== Entertainers ==
- Yoo Dong-geun (born 1956), South Korean actor
- Yang Dong-geun (born 1979), South Korean actor
- Peniel Shin (born Shin Dong-geun, 1993), American rapper, member of boy band BtoB

== Sportspeople ==
- Park Dong-keun (born 1941), South Korean taekwondo grandmaster
- Lee Dong-keun (curler) (born 1979), South Korean curler
- Lee Dong-geun (footballer, born 1981), South Korean footballer
- Shin Dong-keun (born 1981), South Korean footballer
- Yang Dong-geun (basketball) (born 1981), South Korean basketball player
- Yu Dong-geun (born 1985), South Korean handball player
- Lee Dong-geun (footballer, born 1988), South Korean footballer
- Lee Dong-keun (badminton) (born 1990), South Korean badminton player

== Others ==
- Shin Dong-kun (born 1961), South Korean dentist and politician

== See also ==
- List of Korean given names
