= Lee Dong-geun =

Lee Dong-geun (Korean: 이동근) may refer to:

- Lee Dong-geun (footballer, born 1981)
- Lee Dong-geun (footballer, born 1988)
- Lee Dong-keun (badminton) (born 1990)
- Lee Dong-keun (curler) (이동건, born 1979)
