= Lee Jong-hyun (disambiguation) =

Lee Jong-hyun (Korean: 이종현) is a Korean name consisting of the family name Lee and the given name Jong-hyun (Jong-hyeon). It may refer to:

- Lee Jong-hyun (born 1990), a South Korean singer for the rock band CNBLUE
- Lee Jong-hyun (footballer) (born 1987), a South Korean footballer for Gimhae FC
- Lee Jong-hyun (basketball) (born 1994), a South Korean basketballer for Korea University
- Lee Jong-hyeon (born 1930), a South Korean sports shooter
