= Lee Hoon =

Lee Hoon or Lee Hun (Korean: 이훈) is a Korean name consisting of the family name Lee and the given name Hoon, and may also refer to:

- Lee Hoon (actor) (born 1973), South Korean actor
- Lee Hun (footballer) (born 1986), South Korean footballer
