= Ahn Ji-ho =

Ahn Ji-ho may refer to:

- Ahn Ji-ho (footballer) (born 1987), South Korean footballer
- Ahn Ji-ho (actor) (born 2004), South Korean actor
