= Jong-hyun =

- Hangul: 종현
- RR: Jonghyeon
- MR: Chonghyŏn

Jong-hyun, also spelled Jong-hyeon, is a Korean given name.

People with this name include:

== Entertainers ==
- Hong Jong-hyun (born 1990), South Korean actor
- Kim Jong-hyun (1990–2017), South Korean singer, member of boy band Shinee
- Lee Jong-hyun (born 1990), South Korean singer and actor, member of rock band CNBLUE
- Noh Jong-hyun (born 1993), South Korean actor
- Changjo (born Choi Jong-hyun, 1995), South Korean singer, member of boy band Teen Top
- Kim Jong-hyeon (born 1995), South Korean singer and actor, member of NU'EST

== Sportpeople ==
=== Football players ===
- Kim Jong-hyun (footballer) (born 1973), South Korean football coach
- Sung Jong-hyun (born 1979), South Korean football player
- Lee Jong-hyun (footballer) (born 1987), South Korean football player
- Yoo Jong-hyun (born 1988), South Korean football player
- Je Jong-hyun (born 1991), South Korean football player
- Son Jong-hyun (born 1991), South Korean football player

=== Other sports ===
- Lee Jong-hyun (born 1930), South Korean sport shooter
- Pak Jong-hyeon (born 1938), South Korean cyclist
- Hwang Jong-hyun (born 1975), South Korean field hockey player
- Jang Jong-hyun (born 1984), South Korean field hockey player
- Kim Jong-hyun (sport shooter) (born 1985), South Korean sport shooter
- Lee Jong-hyun (basketball) (born 1994), South Korean basketball player

== See also ==
- List of Korean given names
