= Luke DeVere =

Australian soccer manager (born 1989)

Personal information
- Full name: Luke Ramon DeVere
- Date of birth: 5 November 1989 (age 37)
- Place of birth: Melbourne, Victoria, Australia
- Height: 1.86 m (6 ft 1 in)
- Position: Centre back

Youth career
- 2005–2006: QAS
- 2007–2008: AIS

Senior career*
| Years | Team | Apps | (Gls) |
| 2007–2008 | AIS | 40 | (3) |
| 2008–2011 | Brisbane Roar | 65 | (3) |
| 2011–2014 | Gyeongnam FC | 78 | (6) |
| 2015–2019 | Brisbane Roar | 45 | (2) |
| 2019–2021 | Wellington Phoenix | 30 | (0) |

International career^{‡}
| 2007–2009 | Australia U20 | 9 | (1) |
| 2010 | Australia U23 | 2 | (0) |
| 2015 | Australia | 1 | (0) |
- * Club domestic league appearances and goals as of 25 June 2021 ‡ National team caps and goals as of 25 September 2010

Luke Ramon DeVere (born 5 November 1989) is a Former Australian professional footballer who last played for A-League side Wellington Phoenix. He is now the Head Coach of Football Queensland Premier League side Holland Park Hawks FC.

DeVere made his debut for Australia in 2015, having previously played for the nation's under-20 and under-23 sides.

== Club career ==
=== Early life ===
DeVere is of English heritage, and was educated at Brisbane Grammar School, where he played four years of First XI football and was coached by former Australian international Mark Brusasco. He was a junior at The Gap FC. After graduating from Brisbane Grammar in 2006 and being part of the Queensland Academy of Sport Football Program in 2005 and 2006, DeVere was accepted into the Australian Institute of Sport.

=== Brisbane Roar ===
Luke was signed by the Brisbane Roar at the beginning of the 2008–09 season. His debut season in the A-league saw him cement a first team place under manager Frank Farina's guidance. His performances continued to improve during the following seasons, with many football experts and pundits believing he could be a future Socceroo.

On 18 January 2011, it was announced by Brisbane Roar coach Ange Postecoglou on Fox Sports FC that DeVere would be leaving the club on a transfer to South Korean K-League club Gyeongnam FC. Postecoglou initially indicated that DeVere would leave during the January transfer window, contrary to the club's wishes to have him remain at the club for the remainder of the 2010–11 A-League season. It was later announced that he would play his final game for Brisbane on 26 January against Wellington Phoenix at Skilled Park.

=== Gyeongnam ===
DeVere made his debut for Gyeongnam on 5 March 2011, playing the full 90 minutes as he helped his new club win 1–0 against Gangwon FC.

=== Return to Brisbane ===
After his contract at Gyeongnam was not renewed, there was keen interest from both Brisbane Roar and Sydney FC to secure DeVere's signature during the 2015 A-League January transfer window. On 24 January, it was announced that DeVere had signed with his former club Brisbane Roar until the end of the 2014–15 season. Following a successful return to the club, and having been called up to the Australian national team for upcoming friendlies against Germany and Macedonia, DeVere extended his contract at Brisbane for a further 2 years.

DeVere missed over a year of football after injuring his thigh in a friendly match against Villarreal in June 2015. On 7 October 2016, in his first competitive match after returning from injury, DeVere scored a 96th-minute goal to salvage a 1–1 draw for the Roar against Melbourne Victory, toeing a free kick from Tommy Oar over Victory goalkeeper Lawrence Thomas.

=== Wellington Phoenix ===
On 17 June 2019, DeVere signed a one-year deal for Wellington Phoenix.

== International career ==
On 11 March 2015, Devere was selected in a squad to play Germany and Macedonia. On 25 March 2015 he made his debut in a friendly against Germany.

== Career statistics ==
As of 25 August 2020

| Club | Season | League^{1} | | | Cup | | International^{2} | | Total | |
| Club | Season | Division | Apps | Goals | Apps | Goals | Apps | Goals | Apps | Goals |
|---|---|---|---|---|---|---|---|---|---|---|
| AIS | 2007 | Victorian Premier League | 25 | 1 | 0 | 0 | 0 | 0 | 25 | 1 |
| AIS | 2008 | Victorian Premier League | 15 | 2 | 0 | 0 | 0 | 0 | 15 | 2 |
| AIS | AIS total | | 40 | 3 | 0 | 0 | 0 | 0 | 40 | 3 |
| Brisbane Roar | 2008–09 | A-League | 15 | 0 | 3 | 0 | 0 | 0 | 18 | 0 |
| Brisbane Roar | 2009–10 | A-League | 24 | 2 | 0 | 0 | 0 | 0 | 24 | 2 |
| Brisbane Roar | 2010–11 | A-League | 26 | 1 | 0 | 0 | 0 | 0 | 26 | 1 |
| Brisbane Roar | Brisbane total | | 65 | 3 | 3 | 0 | 0 | 0 | 68 | 3 |
| Gyeongnam FC | 2011 | K-League | 30 | 2 | 4 | 0 | 0 | 0 | 34 | 2 |
| Gyeongnam FC | 2012 | K-League | 26 | 3 | 3 | 0 | 0 | 0 | 29 | 3 |
| Gyeongnam FC | 2013 | K-League | 9 | 0 | 1 | 0 | 0 | 0 | 10 | 0 |
| Gyeongnam FC | 2014 | K-League | 13 | 1 | 0 | 0 | 0 | 0 | 13 | 1 |
| Gyeongnam FC | Gyeongnam total | | 78 | 6 | 8 | 0 | 0 | 0 | 86 | 6 |
| Brisbane Roar | 2014–15 | A-League | 6 | 0 | 0 | 0 | 4 | 1 | 10 | 1 |
| Brisbane Roar | 2015–16 | A-League | 0 | 0 | 0 | 0 | 0 | 0 | 0 | 0 |
| Brisbane Roar | 2016–17 | A-League | 25 | 1 | 0 | 0 | 4 | 0 | 29 | 1 |
| Brisbane Roar | 2017–18 | A-League | 9 | 0 | 0 | 0 | 0 | 0 | 9 | 0 |
| Brisbane Roar | 2018–19 | A-League | 5 | 1 | 0 | 0 | 0 | 0 | 5 | 1 |
| Brisbane Roar | Brisbane total | | 45 | 2 | 0 | 0 | 8 | 1 | 53 | 3 |
| Wellington Phoenix | 2019–20 | A-League | 24 | 0 | 1 | 0 | 0 | 0 | 25 | 0 |
| Wellington Phoenix | 2020–21 | A-League | 6 | 0 | 0 | 0 | 0 | 0 | 6 | 0 |
| Wellington Phoenix | Wellington total | | 30 | 0 | 1 | 0 | 0 | 0 | 31 | 0 |
| Career total | | | 258 | 14 | 12 | 0 | 8 | 1 | 278 | 15 |

^{1} – includes A-League final series statistics
^{2} – AFC Champions League statistics are included in season commencing before group stages (i.e. ACL and A-League seasons etc.)

== Honours ==
=== International ===
Australia:

- AFF U-19 Youth Championship: 2008

=== Individual ===
- Brisbane Roar Gary Wilkins Medal: 2009–10
- A-League PFA Team of the Season: 2010–11
