= A-League transfers for 2014–15 season =

This is a list of the transfers for the 2014–15 A-League season. This list includes pre-season and mid-season transfers featuring at least one A-League club. Promotions from youth squads to the first squad of the same club are not included.

== Transfers ==
All players without a flag are Australian. Clubs without a flag are clubs participating in the A-League.

=== Pre-season ===
Date	Name	Moving from	Moving to
27 March 2014	Mark Ochieng	(Australia) AIS Football Program	Adelaide United
27 March 2014	Dylan Smith	(Australia) AIS Football Program	Adelaide United
27 March 2014	Ben Warland	(Australia) AIS Football Program	Adelaide United
4 April 2014	Jacob Burns	Perth Glory	Retired
4 April 2014	Travis Dodd	Perth Glory	Retired
8 April 2014	(England) Michael Bridges	Newcastle Jets	Retired
13 April 2014	(New Zealand) Leo Bertos	Wellington Phoenix	Unattached
13 April 2014	(Belgium) Stein Huysegems	Wellington Phoenix	Unattached
16 April 2014	Sam Mitchinson	Melbourne City	(Australia) Bayswater City
17 April 2014	(Spain) Alejandro Gorrin	(England) Sunderland Reserves	Wellington Phoenix
17 April 2014	Marc Warren	Sydney FC	(Australia) APIA Leichhardt Tigers
17 April 2014	Blake Powell	Sydney FC	(Australia) APIA Leichhardt Tigers
22 April 2014	(New Zealand) Luke Adams	Wellington Phoenix	Unattached
24 April 2014	Dino Djulbic	Unattached	Perth Glory
24 April 2014	David Vranković	Melbourne City	(Australia) Bonnyrigg White Eagles
28 April 2014	(Italy) Alessandro Del Piero	Sydney FC	Unattached
30 April 2014	Aziz Behich	Melbourne City	(Turkey) Bursaspor (end of loan)
30 April 2014	Jeremy Walker	Melbourne City	Unattached
30 April 2014	(Liberia) Patrick Gerhardt	Melbourne City	Unattached
1 May 2014	James Jeggo	Melbourne Victory	Adelaide United
1 May 2014	(Chile) Pablo Contreras	Melbourne Victory	Retired
2 May 2014	(Scotland) Steven McGarry	Perth Glory	Retired
2 May 2014	Jake Barker-Daish	Adelaide United	Unattached
5 May 2014	Ryan Edwards	Perth Glory	(England) Reading (end of loan)
5 May 2014	(Lithuania) Darvydas Šernas	Perth Glory	(Turkey) Gaziantepspor (end of loan)
5 May 2014	James Troisi	Melbourne Victory	(Italy) Atalanta (end of loan)
5 May 2014	Tom Rogic	Melbourne Victory	(Scotland) Celtic (end of loan)
5 May 2014	Richard Garcia	Sydney FC	(United States) Minnesota United
5 May 2014	(Ivory Coast) Adama Traoré	Melbourne Victory	Unattached
7 May 2014	Justin Pasfield	Central Coast Mariners	Unattached
8 May 2014	Joey Gibbs	Newcastle Jets	Unattached
8 May 2014	Josh Mitchell	Newcastle Jets	Unattached
9 May 2014	Matt Acton	Brisbane Roar	Unattached
9 May 2014	Adrian Zahra	Perth Glory	Unattached
11 May 2014	(Northern Ireland) Terry McFlynn	Sydney FC	(Australia) Bonnyrigg White Eagles
12 May 2014	(Netherlands) Orlando Engelaar	Melbourne City	Unattached
12 May 2014	Bernie Ibini	(China) Shanghai SIPG	Sydney FC (loan)
13 May 2014	(Netherlands) Youssouf Hersi	Western Sydney Wanderers	Perth Glory
13 May 2014	(Costa Rica) Carlos Hernández	Wellington Phoenix	Unattached
15 May 2014	(Japan) Shinji Ono	Western Sydney Wanderers	(Japan) Consadole Sapporo
15 May 2014	Mile Sterjovski	Central Coast Mariners	Retired
18 May 2014	(New Zealand) Shane Smeltz	Perth Glory	Sydney FC
16 May 2014	Michael Zullo	Adelaide United	(Netherlands) Utrecht (end of loan)
16 May 2014	Jonathan McKain	Adelaide United	Unattached
20 May 2014	James Brown	Newcastle Jets	Melbourne City
20 May 2014	Connor Chapman	Newcastle Jets	Melbourne City
20 May 2014	Jacob Melling	Adelaide United	Melbourne City
20 May 2014	Dean Heffernan	Western Sydney Wanderers	Retired
21 May 2014	Michael Beauchamp	Western Sydney Wanderers	Unattached
21 May 2014	Aaron Mooy	Western Sydney Wanderers	Melbourne City
21 May 2014	Adam D'Apuzzo	Western Sydney Wanderers	Retired
21 May 2014	(Germany) Jérome Polenz	Western Sydney Wanderers	Unattached
21 May 2014	Jerrad Tyson	Western Sydney Wanderers	Unattached
21 May 2014	Tahj Minniecon	Western Sydney Wanderers	Unattached
23 May 2014	Adam Kwasnik	Central Coast Mariners	Retired
26 May 2014	Diogo Ferreira	Brisbane Roar	Perth Glory
27 May 2014	Dean Bouzanis	Unattached	Western Sydney Wanderers
29 May 2014	Ruben Zadkovich	Newcastle Jets	Perth Glory
30 May 2014	Danny Vukovic	(Japan) Vegalta Sendai	Perth Glory (end of loan)
30 May 2014	(Republic of Ireland) Andy Keogh	Unattached	Perth Glory
4 June 2014	Carl Valeri	(Italy) Ternana Calcio	Melbourne Victory
5 June 2014	(Spain) David Villa	(United States) New York City	Melbourne City (loan)
5 June 2014	George Timotheou	(Australia) Belconnen United	Sydney FC
6 June 2014	Dylan McGowan	Unattached	Adelaide United
6 June 2014	Adrian Madaschi	Unattached	Newcastle Jets
6 June 2014	Josh Barresi	Western Sydney Wanderers	Newcastle Jets
6 June 2014	Mitchell Mallia	Sydney FC	(Australia) Blacktown City
9 June 2014	(Argentina) Marcos Flores	Central Coast Mariners	Newcastle Jets
10 June 2014	(Republic of Ireland) Damien Duff	Unattached	Melbourne City
10 June 2014	Joel Chianese	Sydney FC	(Australia) Sydney United 58
11 June 2014	(New Zealand) Michael McGlinchey	(Japan) Vegalta Sendai	Central Coast Mariners (end of loan)
13 June 2014	Daniel De Silva	Perth Glory	(Italy) Roma
13 June 2014	Daniel De Silva	(Italy) Roma	Perth Glory (loan)
13 June 2014	Zenon Caravella	Newcastle Jets	Unattached
20 June 2014	(Brazil) Vítor Saba	(Italy) Brescia	Western Sydney Wanderers
22 June 2014	Mitch Nichols	(Japan) Cerezo Osaka	Perth Glory (loan)
23 June 2014	Adam Taggart	Newcastle Jets	(England) Fulham
24 June 2014	Nathan Burns	Unattached	Wellington Phoenix
25 June 2014	(Ecuador) Edson Montaño	(Ecuador) Barcelona SC	Newcastle Jets (loan)
26 June 2014	Brendan Hamill	(South Korea) Seongnam	Western Sydney Wanderers
1 July 2014	Alex Brosque	Unattached	Sydney FC
1 July 2014	(Albania) Besart Berisha	Brisbane Roar	Melbourne Victory
1 July 2014	Francesco Stella	Melbourne Victory	Unattached
2 July 2014	Jordan Thurtell	(Australia) AIS Football Program	Perth Glory
7 July 2014	(France) Matthieu Delpierre	Unattached	Melbourne Victory
7 July 2014	(Serbia) Ranko Despotović	Sydney FC	(Spain) Deportivo Alavés
8 July 2014	(England) Jamie Young	Unattached	Brisbane Roar
8 July 2014	Daniel Bowles	Adelaide United	Brisbane Roar
8 July 2014	Julius Davies	Brisbane Roar	(Romania) Oțelul Galați
8 July 2014	Richard Garcia	(United States) Minnesota United	Perth Glory
10 July 2014	(England) Emile Heskey	Newcastle Jets	Unattached
13 July 2014	(Northern Ireland) Jonny Steele	Unattached	Newcastle Jets
15 July 2014	(North Macedonia) Mensur Kurtiši	Unattached	Brisbane Roar
15 July 2014	Joshua Brillante	Newcastle Jets	(Italy) Fiorentina
17 July 2014	Sam Gallagher	Unattached	Newcastle Jets
20 July 2014	(Netherlands) Romeo Castelen	Unattached	Western Sydney Wanderers
22 July 2014	Alex Gersbach	(Australia) AIS Football Program	Sydney FC
25 July 2014	(Argentina) Jerónimo Neumann	Adelaide United	Newcastle Jets
25 July 2014	(Senegal) Malick Mané	(Sweden) IFK Göteborg	Central Coast Mariners (loan)
25 July 2014	(Curaçao) Roly Bonevacia	Unattached	Wellington Phoenix
29 July 2014	(Netherlands) Marcel Seip	Central Coast Mariners	(Netherlands) Emmen
31 July 2014	(Austria) Marc Janko	Unattached	Sydney FC
1 August 2014	(New Zealand) Tom Doyle	(New Zealand) Team Wellington	Wellington Phoenix
3 August 2014	(Slovenia) Robert Koren	Unattached	Melbourne City
4 August 2014	Ivan Franjic	Brisbane Roar	(Russia) Torpedo Moscow
6 August 2014	Billy Celeski	Unattached	Newcastle Jets
12 August 2014	(Hungary) Richárd Vernes	(Hungary) Budapest Honvéd	Central Coast Mariners (loan)
15 August 2014	(Spain) Pablo Sánchez	Unattached	Adelaide United
15 August 2014	Mitchell Oxborrow	Newcastle Jets	Perth Glory
18 August 2014	Marc Marino	(Australia) AIS Football Program	Melbourne City
19 August 2014	(Nigeria) Seyi Adeleke	(Italy) Lazio	Western Sydney Wanderers
7 September 2014	Craig Goodwin	Newcastle Jets	Adelaide United
11 September 2014	(North Macedonia) Daniel Georgievski	Unattached	Melbourne Victory
11 September 2014	Allan Welsh	(Australia) Croydon Kings	Newcastle Jets
11 September 2014	(New Zealand) Michael McGlinchey	Central Coast Mariners	Wellington Phoenix (Contract buyout)
15 September 2014	Matthew Nash	Unattached	Central Coast Mariners
15 September 2014	Erik Paartalu	Unattached	Melbourne City
19 September 2014	(Tunisia) Fahid Ben Khalfallah	Unattached	Melbourne Victory
20 September 2014	Adam Sarota	(Netherlands) Utrecht	Brisbane Roar (loan)
3 October 2014	Zenon Caravella	Unattached	Newcastle Jets
7 October 2014	Matt Acton	(Myanmar) Yangon United	Brisbane Roar
8 October 2014	Jacob Poscoliero	(Australia) Blacktown City	Central Coast Mariners
16 October 2014	(France) William Gallas	Perth Glory	Retired

=== Mid-season ===
Date	Name	Moving from	Moving to
13 October 2014	Nikita Rukavytsya	Unattached	Western Sydney Wanderers
17 October 2014	Reece Caira	Wellington Phoenix	Unattached
21 October 2014	Zachary Cairncross	(Australia) Blacktown City	Central Coast Mariners
31 October 2014	(Spain) David Villa	Melbourne City	(United States) New York City (end of loan)
3 November 2014	Jai Ingham	Brisbane Roar	(Australia) Hume City
6 November 2014	Kearyn Baccus	(Australia) Blacktown City	Western Sydney Wanderers
11 November 2014	(Republic of Ireland) Liam Miller	Brisbane Roar	Melbourne City
15 December 2014	Matt Smith	Brisbane Roar	(Thailand) Bangkok Glass
16 December 2014	(Senegal) Malick Mané	Central Coast Mariners	(Sweden) IFK Göteborg (end of loan)
23 December 2014	(Brazil) Cássio	Adelaide United	Unattached
23 December 2014	(Northern Ireland) Jonny Steele	Newcastle Jets	Unattached
26 December 2014	Nick Kalmar	Melbourne City	Western Sydney Wanderers
31 December 2014	(South Korea) Kim Seung-yong	Central Coast Mariners	(China) Qingdao Hainiu
1 January 2015	Joshua Kennedy	(Japan) Nagoya Grampus	Melbourne City
3 January 2015	Travis Major	Unattached	Central Coast Mariners
5 January 2015	(New Zealand) Jeremy Brockie	Wellington Phoenix	(South Africa) SuperSport United
6 January 2015	(Germany) Jérome Polenz	Unattached	Brisbane Roar
6 January 2015	(Senegal) Mickaël Tavares	Unattached	Sydney FC
11 January 2015	(Japan) Yūsuke Tanaka	(Japan) Kawasaki Frontale	Western Sydney Wanderers
11 January 2015	(Senegal) Jacques Faty	Unattached	Sydney FC
12 January 2015	Kerem Bulut	Unattached	Western Sydney Wanderers
12 January 2015	Sam Gallaway	Newcastle Jets	Western Sydney Wanderers
13 January 2015	(Germany) Dragan Paljić	(Netherlands) Heracles Almelo	Perth Glory
14 January 2015	Dejan Pandurevic	Unattached	Central Coast Mariners
14 January 2015	(Japan) Yojiro Takahagi	(Japan) Sanfrecce Hiroshima	Western Sydney Wanderers
15 January 2015	(North Macedonia) Mensur Kurtiši	Brisbane Roar	Unattached
15 January 2015	Jack Clisby	Perth Glory	Melbourne City
15 January 2015	(Argentina) Marcos Flores	Newcastle Jets	Unattached
16 January 2015	(Republic of Ireland) Liam Miller	Melbourne City	(Republic of Ireland) Cork City
20 January 2015	Robert Stambolziev	(Greece) Niki Volos	Sydney FC
24 January 2015	Luke DeVere	Unattached	Brisbane Roar
27 January 2015	(Portugal) Fábio Ferreira	Adelaide United	Central Coast Mariners
27 January 2015	(Spain) Miguel Palanca	(Spain) Numancia	Adelaide United (loan)
27 January 2015	Mark Birighitti	Newcastle Jets	(Italy) Varese (loan)
27 January 2015	(Brazil) Vítor Saba	Western Sydney Wanderers	Unattached
27 January 2015	Pedj Bojić	Sydney FC	Unattached
28 January 2015	Billy Celeski	Newcastle Jets	Unattached
29 January 2015	(Singapore) Safuwan Baharudin	(Singapore) LionsXII	Melbourne City (loan)
29 January 2015	(Serbia) Andrija Kaluđerović	Unattached	Brisbane Roar
31 January 2015	Daniel Mullen	Western Sydney Wanderers	Newcastle Jets
3 February 2015	Travis Cooper	(Netherlands) VVV-Venlo	Newcastle Jets
3 February 2015	(South Korea) Lee Ki-je	(Japan) Shimizu S-Pulse	Newcastle Jets
4 February 2015	(Argentina) Jerónimo Neumann	Newcastle Jets	Unattached
4 February 2015	(Slovenia) Denis Kramar	(Spain) Getafe B	Perth Glory (loan)
4 February 2015	Jess Vanstrattan	Unattached	Newcastle Jets
8 February 2015	Mitchell Duke	Central Coast Mariners	(Japan) Shimizu S-Pulse
10 February 2015	Ryan Kitto	Adelaide United	(Australia) West Torrens Birkalla
10 February 2015	Christopher Cristaldo	Melbourne Victory	(Australia) Werribee City
13 February 2015	(Nigeria) Seyi Adeleke	Western Sydney Wanderers	Unattached
13 February 2015	Kwabena Appiah	Western Sydney Wanderers	Wellington Phoenix
17 February 2015	(Netherlands) Kew Jaliens	Newcastle Jets	Melbourne City
20 February 2015	Joel Griffiths	Newcastle Jets	Wellington Phoenix
27 February 2015	Nick Ward	Newcastle Jets	Western Sydney Wanderers
27 February 2015	(Serbia) Enver Alivodić	(Serbia) Vojvodina	Newcastle Jets
2 March 2015	Adrian Leijer	Melbourne Victory	(China) Chongqing Lifan
3 March 2015	(Martinique) Harry Novillo	Unattached	Melbourne City
5 March 2015	Brandon O'Neill	Perth Glory	Unattached
16 March 2015	Harry O'Brien	Perth Glory	Unattached
20 March 2015	Adrian Madaschi	Newcastle Jets	Western Sydney Wanderers
28 March 2015	Max Burgess	Sydney FC	Newcastle Jets
7 April 2015	Matthew Davies	Perth Glory	(Malaysia) Pahang
9 April 2015	Mitch Nichols	Perth Glory	(Japan) Cerezo Osaka (end of loan)
23 April 2015	Cameron Edwards	Perth Glory	Unattached
24 April 2015	Michael Turnbull	(Australia) Brisbane Strikers	Melbourne Victory
24 April 2015	Travis Major	Central Coast Mariners	(Australia) Blacktown City
24 April 2015	(Singapore) Safuwan Baharudin	Melbourne City	(Singapore) LionsXII (end of loan)

Player was released to free agency before joining new club
