= Yang Sang-jun =

South Korean footballer

Yang Sang-Jun
Personal information
- Full name: Yang Sang-Jun
- Date of birth: 21 November 1988 (age 37)
- Place of birth: Geoje, Gyeongnam, South Korea
- Height: 1.78 m (5 ft 10 in)
- Position: Forward

Team information
- Current team: Chungju Hummel
- Number: 30

Youth career
- 32: Hongik University

Senior career*
Years	Team	Apps	(Gls)
2010	Gyeongnam FC	4	(0)
2014	Chungju Hummel	12	(0)
- * Club domestic league appearances and goals as of 27 December 2015

- Yang Sang-jun
- Hangul: 양상준
- Hanja: 梁相俊
- RR: Yang Sangjun
- MR: Yang Sangjun

Yang Sang-Jun (Korean: 양상준; born 21 November 1988) is a South Korean footballer who played for Chungju Hummel in K League Challenge.
