= Lee Jae-an =

South Korean footballer (born 1988)

Lee Jae-An
Personal information
- Date of birth: 21 June 1988 (age 38)
- Place of birth: South Korea
- Height: 1.81 m (5 ft 11 1/2 in)
- Position: Forward

Team information
- Current team: Suwon FC
- Number: 79

Youth career
- 2007–2010: Halla University

Senior career*
Years	Team	Apps	(Gls)
2011	FC Seoul	7	(0)
2012–2014	Gyeongnam FC	87	(13)
2015	Seoul E-Land FC	9	(1)
2016–	Suwon FC	50	(2)
2017–2018	→ Asan Mugunghwa (army)	37	(8)
- * Club domestic league appearances and goals as of 29 November 2019

- Lee Jae-an
- Hangul: 이재안
- Hanja: 李宰安
- RR: I Jaean
- MR: I Chaean

Lee Jae-an (Korean: 이재안; born 21 June 1988) is a South Korean footballer who plays as forward for Suwon FC in the K League 2.

== Club career ==
Lee was among FC Seoul's picks from the 2011 draft intake, and made his professional debut on 2 March 2011 as a late substitute in Seoul's 2011 Asian Champions League group match win over Al Ain. On 19 January 2012, he was traded to Gyeongnam FC for defender Kim Joo-Young.

== Club career statistics ==
As of 19 January 2012

Club performance			League		Cup		League Cup		Continental		Total	
Season	Club	League	Apps	Goals	Apps	Goals	Apps	Goals	Apps	Goals	Apps	Goals
Korea Republic			League		FA Cup		K-League Cup		Asia		Total	
2011	FC Seoul	K-League	7	0	0	0	0	0	6	0	13	0
2012	Gyeongnam FC	K-League							-			
Career total			7	0	0	0	0	0	6	0	13	0
