= In Jun-yeon =

South Korean footballer (born 1991)

Personal information
- Date of birth: 12 March 1991 (age 35)
- Place of birth: South Korea
- Height: 1.80 m (5 ft 11 in)
- Position: Midfielder

Team information
- Current team: Pocheon Citizen FC
- Number: 10

Senior career*
Years	Team	Apps	(Gls)
2010	Gyeongnam FC	0	(0)
2012–2014	Daegu FC	11	(1)
2013	→ Chungju Hummel (loan)	14	(2)
2014	Gyeongju KH&NP	9	(1)
2015	Cheonan City	19	(1)
2016	Goyang Zaicro FC	30	(2)
2017-18	Cheonan City FC	16	(0)
2022–	Pocheon Citizen FC	37	(2)
- * Club domestic league appearances and goals as of 22 October 2022

In Jun-yeon (Korean: 인준연; born 12 March 1991) is a South Korean footballer who plays as a midfielder for K3 League side Pocheon Citizen FC.
