= Ko Jae-sung =

South Korean football player

Ko Jae-Sung
Personal information
- Full name: Ko Jae-Sung
- Date of birth: 28 January 1985 (age 41)
- Place of birth: South Korea
- Height: 1.75 m (5 ft 9 in)
- Position: Midfielder

Youth career
- Daegu University

Senior career*
Years	Team	Apps	(Gls)
2008	Suwon City	24	(2)
2009–2010	Seongnam Ilhwa Chunma	35	(0)
2011	Nanchang Hengyuan	28	(3)
2012–2015	Gyeongnam FC	54	(5)
2013–2014	→ Sangju Sangmu (army)	40	(3)
2016	Busan IPark	16	(0)
2017	Semen Padang FC	15	(1)
- * Club domestic league appearances and goals as of 19 February 2016

- Ko Jae-sung
- Hangul: 고재성
- Hanja: 高在成
- RR: Go Jaeseong
- MR: Ko Chaesŏng

Ko Jae-Sung (Korean: 고재성; born 28 January 1985) is a South Korean former footballer, who plays as defensive-midfielder.

On 22 February 2011, Ko signed for Chinese club Nanchang Hengyuan in the Chinese Super League on a one-year deal.

== Club career statistics ==
As of 11 June 2016

Club performance			League		Cup		League Cup		Other		Total	
Season	Club	League	Apps	Goals	Apps	Goals	Apps	Goals	Apps	Goals	Apps	Goals
South Korea			League		KFA Cup		League Cup		Asia		Total	
2008	Suwon City	Korea National League	12	1	1	0	-		-		13	1
2009	Seongnam Ilhwa	K-League	19	0	3	0	6	1	-		28	1
2010	Seongnam Ilhwa	K-League	16	0	2	0	1	0	11	0	30	0
China PR			League		FA Cup		CSL Cup		Asia		Total	
2011	Nanchang Hengyuan	Chinese Super League	28	3	0	0	0	0	-		28	3
South Korea			League		KFA Cup		League Cup		Play-offs		Total	
2012	Gyeongnam FC	K-League	31	2	2	0	0	0	-	-	33	2
2013	Sangju Sangmu	K League Challenge	28	3	1	0	0	0	1	0	30	3
2014	Sangju Sangmu	K League Classic	12	0	1	0	0	0		0	13	0
2014	Gyeongnam FC	K League Classic	12	1	0	0	0	0	2	0	14	1
2015	Gyeongnam FC	K League Challenge	11	2	0	0	0	0	0	0	11	2
2016	Busan IPark	K League Challenge	0	0	1	0	0	0	0	0	1	0
Indonesia			League		Piala Indonesia		Liga 1		Tournament		Total	
2017	Semen Padang FC	Liga 1	15	1	0	0	0	0	1	0	15	1
Career total			184	13	12	0	7	1	16	0	219	14

== Honors ==
=== Club ===
Seongnam Ilhwa Chunma

- AFC Champions League (1): 2010
