= Caíque (footballer, born 1988) =

Brazilian footballer

Personal information
- Full name: Caíque Silva Rocha
- Date of birth: 10 January 1987 (age 39)
- Place of birth: Salvador, Brazil
- Height: 1.83 m (6 ft 0 in)
- Position: Midfielder

Team information
- Current team: Ferroviário

Youth career
- Vitória

Senior career*
Years	Team	Apps	(Gls)
2007–2008	Vitória	0	(1)
2008	Atlético Paranaense	2	(0)
2009	Oeste	18	(3)
2009	Guarani	24	(4)
2009–2013	Olé Brasil	0	(0)
2010–2011	→ Vasco da Gama (loan)	9	(1)
2011	→ Avaí (loan)	6	(0)
2012	→ Gyeongnam FC (loan)	41	(12)
2013–2014	Ulsan Hyundai	19	(3)
2014	→ Chengdu Tiancheng (loan)	7	(0)
2015–2016	Atlético Goianiense	22	(0)
2017	Novorizontino	6	(0)
2017–2018	CSA	13	(0)
2019	Joinville	18	(0)
2020	Ferroviário	25	(3)
2021	Oeste	8	(0)
Total		218	(28)
- * Club domestic league appearances and goals

Caique Silva Rocha (born 10 January 1988), known as just Caíque, is a Brazilian footballer who can play a variety of midfield roles and a journeyman.

== Career ==
Caique was born in Salvador, Bahia. First discovered by the club Vitória, he began his professional career in 2007, helping Bahian back to the top division of Brazilian football. In 2008, after limited playing time for the Lions, he moved clubs to Atlético Paranaense.

After a short spell at Oeste, Caique signed with Guarani of Serie B in 2009. Another transfer to Campinas saw him assist in their promotion to Serie A, after which he was transferred to the Vasco da Gama for the 2010 season.

In 2013, he signed a three-year contract with Ulsan Hyundai.

However, this deal ended prematurely and Rocha found himself playing for Chinese League One side, Chengdu Tiancheng.

== Career statistics ==
Appearances and goals by club, season and competition
Club	Season	League			State League		Cup		Continental		Other		Total	
Club	Season	Division	Apps	Goals	Apps	Goals	Apps	Goals	Apps	Goals	Apps	Goals	Apps	Goals
Atlético Paranaense	2008	Série A	2	0	—		—		—		—		2	0
Oeste	2009	Paulista	—		18	3	—		—		—		18	3
Guarani	2009	Série B	24	4	—		—		—		—		24	4
Vasco da Gama	2010	Série A	4	0	1	0	—		—		—		5	0
Vasco da Gama	2011	Série A	0	0	4	1	1	0	—		—		5	1
Vasco da Gama	Total		4	0	5	1	1	0	—		—		10	1
Avaí	2011	Série A	6	0	—		—		—		—		6	0
Gyeongnam FC	2012	K League Classic	41	12	—		4	1	—		—		45	13
Ulsan Hyundai	2013	K League Classic	18	3	—		1	0	—		—		19	3
Ulsan Hyundai	2014	K League Classic	1	0	—		—		2	0	—		3	0
Ulsan Hyundai	Total		19	3	—		1	0	2	0	—		22	3
Chengdu Tiancheng	2014	China League One	7	0	—		—		—		—		7	0
Atlético Goianiense	2015	Série B	4	0	—		—		—		—		4	0
Atlético Goianiense	2016	Série B	11	0	7	0	1	0	—		—		19	0
Atlético Goianiense	Total		15	0	7	0	1	0	—		—		23	0
Novorizontino	2017	Paulista	—		6	0	—		—		—		6	0
CSA	2017	Série C	11	0	—		—		—		5	0	16	0
CSA	2018	Série B	0	0	2	0	0	0	—		—		2	0
CSA	Total		11	0	2	0	0	0	—		5	0	18	0
Joinville	2019	Série D	4	0	14	0	1	0	—		—		19	0
Ferroviário	2020	Série C	14	1	11	3	—		—		—		25	4
Oeste	2021	Paulista A2	—		8	0	—		—		—		8	0
Career total			147	20	71	7	8	1	2	0	5	0	233	28
