= Mauricio Mendoza =

Colombian footballer (born 1981)

Personal information
- Full name: Mauricio Mendoza Rentería
- Date of birth: 28 December 1981 (age 44)
- Place of birth: Taraira, Vaupés, Colombia
- Height: 1.75 m (5 ft 9 in)
- Position: Winger

Senior career*
Years	Team	Apps	(Gls)
2002	Deportes Quindío		
2003–2004	América de Cali		
2005–2006	Universitario de Deportes		
2007	América de Cali		
2007	Alianza Lima		
2008	Independiente Medellín		
2008	Millonarios		
2009–2010	ES Sahel		
2010	Atlético Bucaramanga		
2011	América de Cali		
2011	Gyeongnam FC		
2011	Deportivo Táchira		
2012	Estudiantes de Mérida		
2012	Deportivo Petare		
2013	Deportes Tolima		
2014	América de Cali		
2015	Llaneros		
2015–2016	FAS	32	(2)
2017	Chalatenango	7	(0)
- * Club domestic league appearances and goals

Mauricio Mendoza Rentería (born 28 December 1981) is a Colombian former professional footballer who played as a winger.
