= Morato (footballer, born 1992) =

Brazilian footballer

Personal information
- Full name: Andrew Eric Feitosa
- Date of birth: 1 September 1992 (age 34)
- Place of birth: Francisco Morato, Brazil
- Height: 1.70 m (5 ft 7 in)
- Position: Winger

Team information
- Current team: Al-Faisaly
- Number: 12

Youth career
- 2001–2006: São Paulo
- 2006–2008: Desportivo Brasil
- 2008: Internacional
- 2009–2010: Olé Brasil

Senior career*
Years	Team	Apps	(Gls)
2011–2012	Gyeongnam	6	(0)
2012–2013	Ferroviária	9	(0)
2014	Mogi Mirim	8	(2)
2014–2015	Boa Esporte	18	(3)
2016	FC Cascavel	7	(4)
2016–2019	Ituano	36	(11)
2017–2018	→ São Paulo (loan)	1	(0)
2018	→ Sport Recife (loan)	7	(0)
2019–2022	Red Bull Bragantino	55	(8)
2021	→ Vasco da Gama (loan)	40	(7)
2022	→ Avaí (loan)	22	(4)
2022–2023	Al-Khaleej	21	(4)
2023–	Al-Faisaly	0	(0)
- * Club domestic league appearances and goals as of 11:49, 1 June 2023 (UTC)

Andrew Eric Feitosa (born 1 September 1992), commonly known as Morato, is a Brazilian footballer who plays as a winger for Saudi Arabian club Al-Faisaly.

== Club career ==
Morato was born in Francisco Morato, São Paulo, Morato finished his formation with Olé Brasil. In 2011 he moved abroad, joining K League Classic side Gyeongnam.

Morato made his professional debut on 23 July 2011, coming on as a late substitute for Yoon Bit-garam in a 2–2 away draw against Incheon United. After six matches, only two as a starter, he was released.

Morato subsequently returned to his homeland, and represented Ferroviária, Mogi Mirim and Boa Esporte in quick succession. On 8 December 2015 he signed for Audax, but moved to FC Cascavel the following 18 February.

After scoring doubles against Maringá and J. Malucelli, Morato was presented at Ituano on 4 May 2016. He was a regular starter for the club during the Série D and the Campeonato Paulista campaigns, notably scoring a brace in a 5–0 home routing of Metropolitano on 9 July.

On 11 April 2017, Morato signed an eight-month contract with São Paulo, club he already represented as a youth. He made his debut for the club eight days later, starting and assisting Lucas Pratto in a 2–1 Copa do Brasil away win against Cruzeiro.

On 7 August 2018, Morato was loaned to fellow top-tier side Sport as a part of Everton Felipe's deal to São Paulo. On 15 January 2019, Ituano announced that Morato had returned to the club.

In April 2019, after performing well in the state league for Ituano, Morato was transferred to newly merged Red Bull Bragantino, where he won the 2019 Campeonato Brasileiro Série B.

On 13 August 2022, Morato joined Saudi Arabian club Al-Khaleej on a two-year deal.

On 26 July 2023, Morato joined Al-Faisaly.

== Career statistics ==
As of 17 December 2021

Appearances and goals by club, season and competition
Club	Season	League			State League		Cup		Conmebol		Other		Total	
Club	Season	Division	Apps	Goals	Apps	Goals	Apps	Goals	Apps	Goals	Apps	Goals	Apps	Goals
Gyeongnam	2011	K League Classic	6	0	—		—		—		—		6	0
Ferroviária	2012	Paulista A2	—		0	0	—		—		6 (Note: All appearance(s) in Copa Paulista)	1	6	1
Ferroviária	2013	Paulista A2	—		9	0	—		—		—		9	0
Ferroviária	Total		—		9	0	—		—		6	1	15	1
Mogi Mirim	2014	Série C	0	0	8	2	—		—		—		8	2
Boa Esporte	2014	Série B	16	2	—		—		—		—		16	2
Boa Esporte	2015	Série B	0	0	2	1	1	0	—		—		3	1
Boa Esporte	Total		16	2	2	1	1	0	—		—		19	3
Cascavel	2016	Paranaense	—		7	4	—		—		—		7	4
Ituano	2016	Série D	11	3	—		—		—		3	1	14	4
Ituano	2017	Série D	0	0	12	2	—		—		—		12	2
Ituano	2019	Série D	0	0	13	6	—		—		—		13	6
Ituano	Total		11	3	25	8	—		—		3	1	39	12
São Paulo (loan)	2017	Série A	0	0	—		1	0	0	0	—		1	0
São Paulo (loan)	2018	Série A	0	0	1	0	0	0	—		—		1	0
São Paulo (loan)	Total		0	0	1	0	1	0	0	0	—		2	0
Sport Recife (loan)	2018	Série A	7	0	—		—		—		—		7	0
Red Bull Bragantino	2019	Série B	23	6	—		—		—		—		23	6
Red Bull Bragantino	2020	Série A	18	0	14	2	2	0	—		—		34	2
Red Bull Bragantino	Total		41	6	14	2	2	0	—		—		57	8
Vasco da Gama (loan)	2021	Série B	29	6	6	1	5	0	—		—		40	7
Career total			110	17	72	18	9	0	0	0	9	2	200	37
