= Kim Young-woo =

South Korean footballer (born 1984)

Personal information
- Date of birth: June 15, 1984 (age 42)
- Place of birth: South Korea
- Height: 1.77 m (5 ft 10 in)
- Position: Midfielder

Team information
- Current team: Jeonnam Dragons
- Number: 19

Youth career
- Kyonggi University

Senior career*
Years	Team	Apps	(Gls)
2007–2011	Gyeongnam FC	78	(8)
2011–2013	Jeonbuk Hyundai Motors	20	(2)
2012–2013	→ Police FC (military)	2	(0)
2014–	Jeonnam Dragons	19	(0)
- * Club domestic league appearances and goals as of 28 September 2013

- Kim Young-woo
- Hangul: 김영우
- Hanja: 金永佑
- RR: Gim Yeongu
- MR: Kim Yŏngu

Kim Young-woo (born June 15, 1984) is a South Korean football player who currently plays for Jeonnam Dragons.

== Club honours ==
At Gyeongnam FC

- Korean FA Cup runner-up: 1

2008

At Jeonbuk Hyundai Motors

- K League: 1

2011

Sporting positions
Preceded by Lee Sang-hong	Gyeongnam FC captain 2010–2011	Succeeded by Jung Da-hwon
