= Jung Dae-sun =

South Korean footballer

Jung Dae-Sun
Personal information
- Full name: Jung Dae-Sun
- Date of birth: 27 June 1987 (age 39)
- Place of birth: Seoul, South Korea
- Height: 1.78 m (5 ft 10 in)
- Position: Striker

Team information
- Current team: Chiangmai
- Number: 11

Youth career
- Chungang University

Senior career*
Years	Team	Apps	(Gls)
2010–2011	Ulsan Hyundai	20	(1)
2011–2013	Gyeongnam FC	28	(2)
2014	FC Anyang	25	(2)
2015-2017	Hwaseong FC	8	(0)
2017–	Chiangmai	0	(0)
- * Club domestic league appearances and goals as of 24 November 2014

- Jung Dae-sun
- Hangul: 정대선
- Hanja: 鄭大善
- RR: Jeong Daeseon
- MR: Chŏng Taesŏn

Jung Dae-Sun (Korean: 정대선; born 27 June 1987) is a South Korean football player who plays for Chiangmai.
