= Park Jin-soo =

South Korean footballer

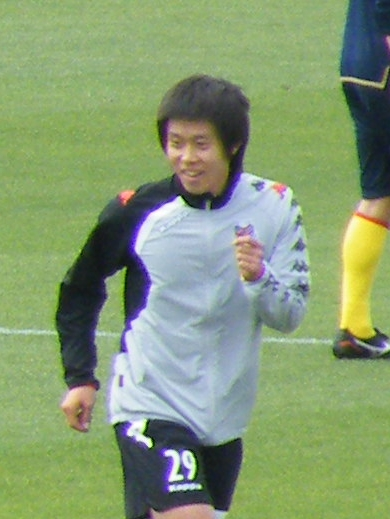

Personal information
- Date of birth: March 1, 1987 (age 39)
- Place of birth: South Korea
- Height: 1.81 m (5 ft 11 in)
- Position: Midfielder

Team information
- Current team: Chungju Hummel
- Number: 4

Youth career
- 2006–2009: Korea University

Senior career*
Years	Team	Apps	(Gls)
2010	Consadole Sapporo	2	(0)
2011–2012	Gyeongnam FC	0	(0)
2013–2015	Chungju Hummel	74	(4)
- * Club domestic league appearances and goals as of 23 December 2015

- Park Jin-soo
- Hangul: 박진수
- RR: Bak Jinsu
- MR: Pak Chinsu

Park Jin-soo (born March 1, 1987) is a South Korean football player who played for Chungju Hummel. His younger brother, Park Hyung-jin, is also a football player.

== Club statistics ==
Club performance			League		Cup		Total	
Season	Club	League	Apps	Goals	Apps	Goals	Apps	Goals
Japan			League		Emperor's Cup		Total	
2010	Consadole Sapporo	J2 League	2	0	0	0	2	0
Country	Japan		2	0	0	0	2	0
Total			2	0	0	0	2	0
