= Ahn Ji-ho (footballer) =

South Korean footballer

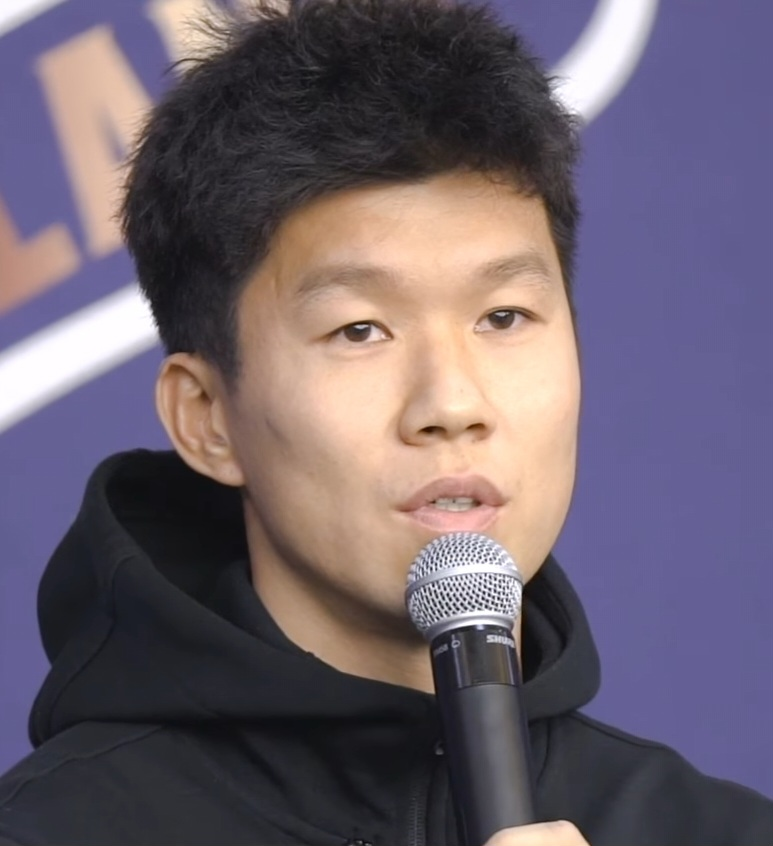

Personal information
- Date of birth: 24 April 1987 (age 39)
- Place of birth: Seoul, South Korea
- Height: 1.83 m (6 ft 0 in)
- Position: Defender

Team information
- Current team: Hwaseong FC
- Number: 5

Youth career
- 2003–2005: Boin High School
- 2006: Yonsei University

Senior career*
Years	Team	Apps	(Gls)
2007	Daejeon Citizen	0	(0)
2008–2010	Incheon United	27	(0)
2011	Gyeongnam FC	10	(0)
2014–2015	Goyang Hi FC	55	(0)
2016–2017	Gangwon FC	58	(5)
2018–2019	Seoul E-Land	41	(1)
2020	Gangneung City FC	17	(0)
2021	Gyeongju KHNP FC	22	(0)
2022-	Hwaseong FC	13	(0)

International career
2005–2007	South Korea U20	17	(1)
- * Club domestic league appearances and goals as of 22 October 2022

- Ahn Ji-ho
- Hangul: 안지호
- RR: An Jiho
- MR: An Chiho

Former name
- Hangul: 안현식
- RR: An Hyeonsik
- MR: An Hyŏnsik

Ahn Ji-ho (Korean: 안지호; born 24 April 1987) is a South Korean footballer who plays as a defender for Hwaseong FC.

== Club career ==
At the 2008 K League draft, Daejeon Citizen selected him as the first pick, and exchanged him for Lee Dong-won.

== International career ==
Ahn was a member of the South Korea national football team at the 2007 FIFA U-20 World Cup in Canada, but did not appear in any matches.

== Club career statistics ==
Club performance			League		Cup		League Cup		Continental		Total	
Season	Club	League	Apps	Goals	Apps	Goals	Apps	Goals	Apps	Goals	Apps	Goals
South Korea			League		KFA Cup		League Cup		Asia		Total	
2007	Daejeon Citizen	K-League	0	0	0	0	0	0	—		0	0
2008	Incheon United	K-League	14	0	1	0	7	0	—		22	0
2009	Incheon United	K-League	2	0	0	0	0	0	—		2	0
2010	Incheon United	K-League	11	0	1	0	1	0	—		13	0
2011	Gyeongnam FC	K-League	10	0	0	0	4	1	—		14	1
Career total			37	0	2	0	12	1	—		51	1
