= Lee Dong-geun (footballer, born 1981) =

South Korean footballer

Lee Dong-Geun
Personal information
- Full name: Lee Dong-Geun (이동근)
- Date of birth: January 23, 1981 (age 45)
- Place of birth: South Korea
- Height: 1.75 m (5 ft 9 in)
- Position: Midfielder

Senior career*
| Years | Team | Apps | (Gls) |
| 2003–2004 | Bucheon SK | 27 | (2) |
| 2005–2006 | Gwangju Sangmu | 7 | (0) |
| 2007–2008 | Daejeon Citizen | 16 | (0) |
| 2009 | Ulsan Hyundai Horang-i | | |
| 2010 | Cheonan City FC | | |
- * Club domestic league appearances and goals

- Lee Dong-geun
- Hangul: 이동근
- RR: I Donggeun
- MR: I Tonggŭn

Lee Dong-Geun (born January 23, 1981) is a South Korean footballer who formerly played for Bucheon SK, Gwangju Sangmu and Daejeon Citizen.
