= Lúcio Curió =

Brazilian footballer

Personal information
- Full name: Lúcio Teófilo da Silva
- Date of birth: 2 July 1984 (age 42)
- Place of birth: Guarabira, Paraíba, Brazil
- Height: 1.84 m (6 ft 1/2 in)
- Position: Striker

Team information
- Current team: America-RN

Senior career*
Years	Team	Apps	(Gls)
2007–2010	CSP		
2008	→ Novo Hamburgo (Loan)		
2008	→ Sport Recife (Loan)	2	(0)
2009	→ America-RN (Loan)	33	(15)
2010	→ Gyeongnam FC (Loan)	11	(9)
2010–2011	Gyeongnam FC	24	(8)
2011	Ulsan Hyundai	15	(0)
2012	America-RN	32	(10)
2013	Gwangju FC	32	(13)
2014	ABC	11	(2)
2014	Botafogo-PB	11	(2)
2016	Treze	6	(3)
2016	America-RN	5	(4)
- * Club domestic league appearances and goals as of 21:53, 22 May 2016 (UTC)

Lúcio Teófilo da Silva, better known as Lúcio Curió (born 2 July 1984) is a Brazilian football player. He is currently at the América Futebol Clube (RN). Previously he has represented a number of teams in the north–east of Brazil, and a number of teams in South Korea.

== Career ==
Lúcio Curió began his professional career at CSP in Paraíba state. Whilst a CSP player, he served loan spells with larger clubs, making two substitute appearances in Série A for Sport Recife in 2008. On 10 May 2009 he scored his first professional goal for America-RN in a 2–1 Série B defeat to Atlético Goianiense. He scored a total of 15 goals in the season, two behind the top scorer in the division.

In 2010, he moved to South Korea to join K League side Gyeongnam FC. He was top scorer in the league season for the team with 13 goals. On 21 July 2011, he transferred to fellow K League side Ulsan Hyundai. He failed to score in fifteen games.

On 29 February 2012 he returned to Brazil, and to America-RN for a second spell. He scored a further 10 Série B goals during the season.

For the 2013 season Lúcio Curió started a second spell in South Korea, with K League Challenge side Gwangju FC. He again returned to Brazil on 12 February 2014, signing for ABC on a one-year contract. However, after some criticism from the fans, he left after less than three months to join Botafogo-PB.

Lúcio Curió left Botafogo-PB at the end of the Série C and didn't sign again for a professional side until the end of 2015. Amidst suggestions of a return to America-RN for a third spell, he returned to Paraíba state, signing for Treze on 28 November 2015 for the duration of the 2016 Campeonato Paraibano. He scored 3 goals in 6 games, but on 16 March 2016, with the club having won only two of its first 8 games in the competition, and not having secured a place in the second phase, he had his contract terminated, along with four other players.

A day after leaving Treze, Lúcio Curió did sign for America-RN for a third spell.
