= Kang Seung-jo =

South Korean footballer (born 1986)

Kang Seung-Jo
Personal information
- Full name: Kang Seung-Jo
- Date of birth: January 20, 1986 (age 40)
- Place of birth: Seoul, South Korea
- Height: 1.82 m (6 ft 0 in)
- Position: Centre midfielder

Team information
- Current team: Penang
- Number: 14

Youth career
- Dankook University

Senior career*
Years	Team	Apps	(Gls)
2008–2009	Busan IPark	18	(4)
2010–2011	Jeonbuk Hyundai Motors	27	(4)
2011–2013	Gyeongnam FC	67	(10)
2014–2016	FC Seoul	17	(0)
2015–2016	→ Ansan Mugunghwa (army)	33	(4)
2017	Daejeon Citizen	10	(0)
2017	Gyeongnam FC	3	(0)
2018–	Penang FA	19	(3)

International career^{‡}
2003	South Korea U-17	3	(0)
2004	South Korea U-20	3	(0)
- * Club domestic league appearances and goals as of 27 July 2018 ‡ National team caps and goals as of 2 May 2009

Kang Seung-Jo (Korean: 강승조; born January 20, 1986) is a South Korean football player.

== Club career ==
He played for many K League teams including Busan IPark, Jeonbuk Hyundai Motors, Gyeongnam FC, and FC Seoul. He scored one goal in the 2014 AFC Champions League.

Sporting positions
Preceded by Jung Da-Hwon	Gyeongnam FC captain 2012	Succeeded by Incumbent
