= Jung Da-hwon =

South Korean footballer (born 1987)

Jung Da-Hwon
Personal information
- Full name: Jung Da-Hwon
- Date of birth: 22 December 1987 (age 38)
- Place of birth: Daejeon, South Korea
- Height: 1.80 m (5 ft 11 in)
- Position: Wing-back

Team information
- Current team: United City

Youth career
- 2006–2008: Chungbuk University

Senior career*
Years	Team	Apps	(Gls)
2009–2010	FC Seoul	0	(0)
2011–2013	Gyeongnam FC	91	(1)
2014–2018	Jeju United	69	(3)
2016–2017	→ Asan Mugunghwa (army)	42	(3)
2019	Gwangju FC	0	(0)
2019–2021	Asan Mugunghwa	9	(0)
2021–	United City	0	(0)
- * Club domestic league appearances and goals as of 3 March 2021

- Jung Da-hwon
- Hangul: 정다훤
- Hanja: 鄭多煊
- RR: Jeong Dahwon
- MR: Chŏng Tahwŏn

Jung Da-Hwon (Korean: 정다훤; born 22 December 1987) is a South Korean footballer who plays as wingback for Philippines Football League club United City.

== Club career ==
Jung was drafted in the extras pick of the 2009 K-League Draft by FC Seoul. He did not play a first team match since joining in Seoul, and played mainly in the reserve team. On 24 July 2009, he made his first team squad debut in a friendly against Manchester United, coming on as substitute for Kim Chi-Gon.

After the end of the 2010 season, Jung became a free agent. He subsequently joined Gyeongnam FC. On 5 March 2011, Jung made K-League debut against Gangwon FC in a 1–0 away victory.

In February 2019, he joined Gwangju FC.

Sporting positions
Preceded by Kim Young-Woo	Gyeongnam FC captain 2011	Succeeded by Kang Seung-Jo
