= Roni (footballer, born April 1991) =

Brazilian footballer

Personal information
- Full name: Ronieli Gomes dos Santos
- Date of birth: 25 April 1991 (age 35)
- Place of birth: São Paulo, Brazil
- Height: 5 ft 10 in (1.78 m)
- Position: Forward

Team information
- Current team: URT

Youth career
- 2003–2005: Marília
- 2005–2011: São Paulo

Senior career*
Years	Team	Apps	(Gls)
2008–2015	São Paulo	1	(0)
2010–2011	→ Karşıyaka (loan)	6	(1)
2011–2012	→ Gyeongnam FC (loan)	16	(1)
2013	→ Sagan Tosu (loan)	4	(0)
2014	→ Chapecoense (loan)	5	(0)
2015	→ XV de Piracicaba (loan)	11	(3)
2015	→ Bragantino (loan)	0	(0)
2015	Adanaspor	6	(0)
2016–2017	Mogi Mirim	11	(0)
2017	Villa Nova	9	(5)
2017	Luverdense	7	(0)
2018	Água Santa	0	(0)
2019	Marcílio Dias	0	(0)
2020–	URT	0	(0)

International career
2008	Brazil U-19	1	(1)
- * Club domestic league appearances and goals as of 14 March 2018

Ronieli Gomes dos Santos (born April 25, 1991), better known as Roni is a Brazilian professional footballer who plays as a striker for URT.

== Career ==
19-year-old Ronieli was a surprise inclusion in São Paulo's 2008 Libertadores Cup campaign where he was given the number 16 shirt.

He has been widely tipped to be as some of the biggest strikers to emerge from Brazil including Ronaldo and Pelé and he has been likened to AC Milan striker Alexandre Pato. Surprisingly he was loaned by Turkish 1st division team Karşıyaka S.K. for the season 2010–2011.

After a loan spell in Turkey, on 26 July 2011, he joined South Korean K-League outfit Gyeongnam FC on a season-long loan deal.

Roni has a contract with São Paulo FC until 31 December 2015.

== Club statistics ==
Club performance			League		Cup		League Cup		Continental		Total	
Season	Club	League	Apps	Goals	Apps	Goals	Apps	Goals	Apps	Goals	Apps	Goals
Turkey			League		FA Cup		League Cup		Continental		Total	
2010-11	Karşıyaka	1. Lig	6	1	1	0	0	0	0	0	7	1
Korea Republic			League		FA Cup		League Cup		Asia		Total	
2011	Gyeongnam	K-League	10	1	0	0	0	0	-	-	10	1
2012	Gyeongnam	K-League	6	0	0	0	0	0	-	-	6	0
Japan			League		FA Cup		League Cup		Asia		Total	
2013	Sagan Tosu	J1 League	0	0	0	0	0	0	-	-	0	0
Total	Turkey		6	1	1	0	-	-	-	-	7	1
Total	Korea Republic		16	1	0	0	-	-	0	0	16	1
Total	Japan		0	0	0	0	0	0	0	0	0	0
Career total			22	2	1	0	0	0	0	0	23	2

== Title ==
São Paulo

- Brazilian League: 2008
