= Oh Kwang-jin =

South Korean footballer

Oh Kwang-Jin
Personal information
- Full name: Oh Kwang-Jin
- Date of birth: 4 June 1987 (age 39)
- Place of birth: South Korea
- Height: 1.72 m (5 ft 7 1/2 in)
- Position: Midfielder

Team information
- Current team: Daegu FC
- Number: 2

Youth career
- 2006–2009: University of Ulsan

Senior career*
Years	Team	Apps	(Gls)
2010	Ulsan Hyundai	0	(0)
2011	Gyeongnam FC	0	(0)
2012–2013	Gimhae FC	21	(0)
2013–2015	Suwon FC	43	(0)
2016–2019	Daegu FC	31	(0)
- * Club domestic league appearances and goals as of 1 January 2019

Oh Kwang-Jin (Korean: 오광진; born 4 June 1987) is a South Korean footballer who plays as midfielder for Daegu FC.

== Career ==
He played for Ulsan Hyundai and Gyeongnam FC but made no appearances in the top division. He moved to Korea National League side Gimhae FC in 2012.

He signed with Suwon FC after a year and a half with Gimhae. Oh made his debut for Suwon in the league match against Police FC on 6 July.
