= Kim Do-yeop =

South Korean footballer (born 1988)

Personal information
- Full name: Kim Do-yeop
- Date of birth: November 26, 1988 (age 37)
- Place of birth: Nonsan, Chungnam, South Korea
- Height: 1.80 m (5 ft 11 in)
- Position: Winger

Team information
- Current team: Asan Mugunghwa
- Number: 20

Youth career
- Sunmoon University

Senior career*
Years	Team	Apps	(Gls)
2010–2017	Gyeongnam FC	143	(27)
2015–2016	→ Sangju Sangmu (army)	21	(7)
2017–2018	Jeju United	7	(0)
2018	Seongnam FC	13	(1)
2019–	Asan Mugunghwa	13	(0)
- * Club domestic league appearances and goals as of 26 November 2018

Kim Do-yeop (born November 26, 1988) is a South Korean football player who plays for K League 2 side Asan Mugunghwa. He changed his name from 'Kim In-han' in 2014.

== Career statistics ==
=== Gyeongnam FC ===
Originally named as "Kim In-Han" was drafted to Gyeongnam FC from Sunmoon University as their 3rd choice in 2010 and since then, he only played for Gyeongnam FC, except for a period, where he went to Sangju Sangmu to serve mandatory military service in Korea.

Appearances and goals by club, season and competition
Club	Season	League			FA Cup		League Cup		Continental		Total	
Club	Season	Division	Apps	Goals	Apps	Goals	Apps	Goals	Apps	Goals	Apps	Goals
Gyeongnam FC	2010	K League	18	5	0	0	0	0	0	0	18	5
Gyeongnam FC	2011	K League	23	4	0	0	0	0	0	0	23	4
Gyeongnam FC	2012	K League	40	10	0	0	0	0	0	0	40	10
Gyeongnam FC	2013	K League Classic	8	0	0	0	0	0	0	0	8	0
Gyeongnam FC	2014	K League Classic	27	1	0	0	0	0	0	0	40	0
Sangju Sangmu (Military Service)	2015	K League Classic	18	6	0	0	0	0	0	0	18	6
Sangju Sangmu (Military Service)	2016	K League Challenge	3	1	0	0	0	0	0	0	3	1
Gyeongnam FC	2016	K League Challenge	8	1	0	0	0	0	0	0	8	1
Gyeongnam FC	2017	K League Challenge	9	3	0	0	0	0	0	0	9	3
Total			154	31	0	0	0	0	0	0	154	31
Career total			154	31	0	0	0	0	0	0	154	31
