= Kim Jin-hyun (footballer, born 1987 in Haenam) =

South Korean footballer

Personal information
- Date of birth: 29 July 1987 (age 39)
- Place of birth: Haenam, Jeollanam-do, South Korea
- Height: 1.77 m (5 ft 10 in)
- Positions: Winger; midfielder; right back

Youth career
- 2003–2005: Gwangyang Jecheol High School

Senior career*
Years	Team	Apps	(Gls)
2007–2009	Chunnam Dragons	14	(2)
2010–2011	Gyeongnam FC	14	(0)
2012	Daejeon KHNP	10	(1)
2013	Daejeon Citizen	2	(0)
2013	Gyeongju KHNP	6	(0)
2014–2016	Hwaseong FC		
2016–2017	Bucheon FC	16	(0)
- * Club domestic league appearances and goals as of 1 January 2018

- Kim Jin-hyun
- Hangul: 김진현
- Hanja: 金眞賢
- RR: Gim Jinhyeon
- MR: Kim Chinhyŏn

Kim Jin-hyun (Korean: 김진현; born 29 July 1987) is a South Korean football player who played for Bucheon FC.
