= Lee Hun (footballer) =

South Korean footballer

Personal information
- Full name: Lee Hun
- Date of birth: 29 April 1986 (age 40)
- Place of birth: Seoul, South Korea
- Height: 1.80 m (5 ft 11 in)
- Position: Forward

Youth career
- 2006–2008: Yonsei University

Senior career*
Years	Team	Apps	(Gls)
2009–2011	Gyeongnam FC	51	(7)
- * Club domestic league appearances and goals as of 2 February 2011

Lee Hun (Korean: 이훈; born 29 April 1986) is a South Korean football forward, who played for Gyeongnam FC in K-League.

== Club career statistics ==
As of 2 February 2011

Club performance			League		Cup		League Cup		Total	
Season	Club	League	Apps	Goals	Apps	Goals	Apps	Goals	Apps	Goals
South Korea			League		KFA Cup		League Cup		Total	
2009	Gyeongnam FC	K-League	20	3	1	0	0	0	21	3
2010	Gyeongnam FC	K-League	17	1	1	1	6	0	24	2
Career total			37	4	2	1	6	0	45	5
