= Lee Yong-gi =

South Korean footballer

Lee Yong-Gi
Personal information
- Full name: Lee Yong-Gi
- Date of birth: May 30, 1985 (age 41)
- Place of birth: Seoul, South Korea
- Height: 1.89 m (6 ft 2 1/2 in)
- Position: Centre back

Team information
- Current team: Chungju Hummel
- Number: 20

Youth career
- Yonsei University

Senior career*
Years	Team	Apps	(Gls)
2009–2014	Gyeongnam FC	29	(0)
2013–2014	→ Sangju Sangmu (army)	6	(0)
2015	Chungju Hummel	16	(0)
- * Club domestic league appearances and goals as of 24 December 2015

Lee Yong-Gi (born May 30, 1985) is a South Korean football player who played for Chungju Hummel.
