= Lee Jong-hyun (footballer) =

South Korean footballer

Lee Jong-Hyun
Personal information
- Full name: Lee Jong-Hyun
- Date of birth: 8 January 1987 (age 39)
- Place of birth: South Korea
- Height: 1.75 m (5 ft 9 in)
- Position: Midfielder

Senior career*
Years	Team	Apps	(Gls)
2010	Gyeongnam FC	0	(0)
2011	Incheon United	2	(0)
2012–2014	Gimhae City FC	32	(0)
- * Club domestic league appearances and goals as of 27 April 2025

Lee Jong-Hyun (Korean: 이종현; born 8 January 1987) is a South Korean football midfielder who formerly played for Gimhae City FC in the Korea National League. He had previously played for K-League clubs Gyeongnam FC and Incheon United.

== Club career ==
Lee joined Gyeongnam FC for the 2010 season, but never played for the club at senior level. Moving to Incheon United FC the following season, his professional debut was in an away match against Sangju Sangmu Phoenix on 5 March 2011 in which he played 15 minutes as a late substitute.

Generally spending the majority of the 2011 K-League matches as an unused substitute, Lee has seen more matchplay in the group games of the 2011 K-League Cup, including a start in the 1–0 loss to his former club Gyeongnam FC.

In June 2012, Lee joined Korea National League side Gimhae City FC.

== Club career statistics ==
As of 27 April 2025

Club performance			League		Cup		League Cup		Total	
Season	Club	League	Apps	Goals	Apps	Goals	Apps	Goals	Apps	Goals
South Korea			League		KFA Cup		League Cup		Total	
2010	Gyeongnam FC	K-League	0	0	0	0	0	0	0	0
2011	Incheon United	K-League	2	0	0	0	3	0	5	0
2012	Gimhae City FC	Korea National League	9	0	0	0	-		9	0
2013	Gimhae City FC	Korea National League	13	0	0	0	-		13	0
2014	Gimhae City FC	Korea National League	10	0	0	0	-		10	0
Career total			34	0	0	0	3	0	37	0
