= Lee Hea-kang =

South Korean footballer

Lee Hea-Kang
Personal information
- Date of birth: 28 March 1987 (age 39)
- Place of birth: South Korea
- Height: 1.75 m (5 ft 9 in)
- Position: Defender

Youth career
- 2006–2009: Dong-eui University

Senior career*
Years	Team	Apps	(Gls)
2010–2011	Gyeongnam FC	10	(0)
- * Club domestic league appearances and goals as of 7 December 2011

- Lee Hea-kang
- Hangul: 이혜강
- Hanja: 李慧剛
- RR: I Hyegang
- MR: I Hyegang

Lee Hea-kang (Korean: 이혜강; born 28 March 1987) is a South Korean footballer who plays as defender.

== Club career statistics ==
As of 7 December 2011

Club performance			League		Cup		League Cup		Total	
Season	Club	League	Apps	Goals	Apps	Goals	Apps	Goals	Apps	Goals
South Korea			League		KFA Cup		League Cup		Total	
2010	Gyeongnam FC	K-League	4	0	0	0	0	0	4	0
2011	Gyeongnam FC	K-League	6	0	0	0	1	0	7	0
Career total			10	0	0	0	1	0	11	0
