= Lee Jae-myung (footballer) =

South Korean footballer (born 1991)

Lee Jae-Myung
Personal information
- Date of birth: July 25, 1991 (age 35)
- Place of birth: Daejeon, South Korea
- Height: 1.80 m (5 ft 11 in)
- Position: Full back

Team information
- Current team: Gyeongnam FC
- Number: 13

Youth career
- Jinju High School (Gyeongnam FC U-18)

Senior career*
Years	Team	Apps	(Gls)
2010–2012	Gyeongnam FC	55	(0)
2013–2017	Jeonbuk Hyundai Motors	35	(1)
2016–2017	→ Sangju Sangmu (army)	10	(0)
2018–	Gyeongnam FC	28	(0)

International career
- South Korea U-20
- * Club domestic league appearances and goals as of 13 March 2022

Lee Jae-Myung (Korean: 이재명; born July 25, 1991) is a South Korean football player who plays for Gyeongnam FC.
