= Kim Jong-soo (footballer) =

South Korean footballer

Kim Jong-Soo
Personal information
- Full name: Kim Jong-Soo
- Date of birth: 25 July 1986 (age 40)
- Place of birth: South Korea
- Height: 1.86 m (6 ft 1 in)
- Position: Centre back

Team information
- Current team: Daejeon Citizen
- Number: 15

Youth career
- Dongguk University

Senior career*
Years	Team	Apps	(Gls)
2009–2012	Gyeongnam FC	42	(1)
2013–	Daejeon Citizen	5	(0)
- * Club domestic league appearances and goals as of 23 December 2013

Kim Jong-Soo (Korean: 김종수; born 25 July 1986) is a South Korean footballer who plays as a centre back for Daejeon Citizen in the K League Challenge.
