= An Sung-bin =

South Korean footballer

An Sung-Bin
Personal information
- Full name: An Sung-Bin
- Date of birth: 3 October 1988 (age 38)
- Place of birth: Namyangju, Gyeonggi, South Korea
- Height: 1.78 m (5 ft 10 in)
- Position: Forward

Team information
- Current team: Gyeongnam FC

Youth career
- University of Suwon

Senior career*
Years	Team	Apps	(Gls)
2010–2014	Gyeongnam FC	27	(1)
2013–2014	→ Ansan Police (army)	38	(2)
2015–2017	FC Anyang	72	(9)
2017	Gyeongnam FC	2	(0)
2018–	Gyeongnam FC	0	(0)
- * Club domestic league appearances and goals as of 1 December 2016

- An Sung-bin
- Hangul: 안성빈
- Hanja: 安聖彬
- RR: An Seongbin
- MR: An Sŏngbin

An Sung-Bin (Korean: 안성빈; born 3 October 1988) is a South Korean footballer who plays for Gyeongnam FC in the K League 1.

== Club career ==
An started his career at Gyeongnam FC, joining in the 2010 K-League Draft. He made his debut in a match against Daejeon Citizen on 7 March 2010. An scored his first goal against Jeonbuk Hyundai Motors in the K-League Cup opening game, which Gyeongnam FC lost 1–2.

== Career statistics ==
Club performance			League		Cup		League Cup		Total	
Season	Club	League	Apps	Goals	Apps	Goals	Apps	Goals	Apps	Goals
South Korea			League		KFA Cup		League Cup		Total	
2010	Gyeongnam FC	K-League	7	0	0	0	1	1	8	1
2011	Gyeongnam FC	K-League	2	0	3	0	0	0	5	0
Career total			9	0	3	0	1	1	13	1
