= Lee Dong-geun (footballer, born 1988) =

South Korean footballer

Lee Dong-Geun
Personal information
- Full name: Lee Dong-Geun
- Date of birth: 28 November 1988 (age 37)
- Place of birth: South Korea
- Height: 1.77 m (5 ft 9 1/2 in)
- Position: Midfielder

Youth career
- University of Ulsan

Senior career*
Years	Team	Apps	(Gls)
2011—2012	Gyeongnam FC	2	(0)
- * Club domestic league appearances and goals as of 8 January 2014

- Lee Dong-geun
- Hangul: 이동근
- Hanja: 李東根
- RR: I Donggeun
- MR: I Tonggŭn

Lee Dong-Geun (Korean: 이동근; born 28 November 1988) is a South Korean football midfielder, who played for Gyeongnam FC in the K-League from 2011–2012.

== Club career ==
Lee was one of Gyeongnam FC's draft picks for the 2011 season. Choi made his professional debut on 17 April 2011, as a late substitute in the dying seconds of Gyeongnam's league match against the Chunnam Dragons. Lee also appeared as a late substitute in Gyeongnam's loss to Ulsan Hyundai FC in the semi-final of the 2011 K-League Cup, scoring his first professional goal within a few minutes of getting on the pitch.

== Club career statistics ==
As of 8 January 2014

Club performance			League		Cup		League Cup		Total	
Season	Club	League	Apps	Goals	Apps	Goals	Apps	Goals	Apps	Goals
South Korea			League		KFA Cup		League Cup		Total	
2011	Gyeongnam FC	K-League	2	0	1	0	1	1	4	1
2012	Gyeongnam FC	K-League	0	0	0	0	-		0	0
Career total			2	0	1	0	1	1	4	1
