= 2012 Daejeon Citizen FC season =

Daejeon Citizen
2012 season
- Chairman: Daejeon mayor
- Manager: Yoo Sang-Chul
- K-League: 15th
- Korean FA Cup: Round of 16
- Top goalscorer: League: Kevin Oris (3); All: Kevin Oris (4)
- Highest home attendance: 10,160 vs Jeonbuk (March 11)
- Lowest home attendance: 1,842 vs Busan (April 7)
- Average home league attendance: 5,101 (as of May 28)
Home colours	Away colours

The 2012 season was Daejeon Citizen's sixteenth season in the K-League in South Korea. Daejeon Citizen will be competing in K-League and Korean FA Cup.

== Current squad ==
Note: Flags indicate national team as defined under FIFA eligibility rules; some limited exceptions apply. Players may hold more than one non-FIFA nationality.

No.	Pos.	Nation	Player
1	GK	KOR	Choi Hyun
2	DF	BRA	Alessandro
3	DF	KOR	Park Kun-Young
4	DF	KOR	Yoo Woo-Ram
5	MF	KOR	Kim Tae-Yeon
6	MF	KOR	Lee Seul-Gi
7	MF	KOR	Park Min-Keun
8	FW	KOR	Kim Dong-Hee
9	FW	BEL	Kevin Oris
10	MF	KOR	Lee Hyun-Woong
12	MF	KOR	Hwang Myung-Gyu
13	DF	KOR	Kim Chang-Hoon
14	MF	JPN	Yuta Baba
15	DF	KOR	Hwang Do-Yeon (on loan from Chunnam)
16	MF	KOR	Go Dae-Woo
17	MF	KOR	Hwang Jin-San
18	FW	KOR	Han Geu-Loo
19	FW	KOR	Chung Kyung-Ho

No.	Pos.	Nation	Player
20	DF	KOR	Lee Ho (captain)
22	FW	KOR	Kim Hyeung-Bum (on loan from Jeonbuk)
23	DF	KOR	Kang Woo-Ram
24	MF	KOR	Heo Beom-San
25	MF	KOR	Ji Kyeong-Deuk
26	DF	KOR	Kim Jae-Hoon
27	MF	KOR	Han Deok-Hee
28	FW	KOR	Lee Sang-Su
29	DF	KOR	Lee Kwang-Hyun
30	FW	KOR	Han Kyung-In
31	GK	KOR	Kim Sun-Kyu
33	DF	KOR	Lee Woong-Hee
36	MF	KOR	Kim Woo-Jin
37	MF	KOR	Kim Seul-Gi
38	MF	KOR	Yoo Byoung-Woon
41	GK	KOR	Hong Sang-Jun
44	FW	KOR	Namgung Do (on loan from Seongnam)

=== Out on loan ===
Note: Flags indicate national team as defined under FIFA eligibility rules; some limited exceptions apply. Players may hold more than one non-FIFA nationality.

No.	Pos.	Nation	Player
—	DF	KOR	Kim Young-Bin (to Sangju Sangmu Phoenix for military service)

== Transfer ==
=== In ===
Date	Pos.	Player	From	Fee	Ref
3 November 2011	MF	(South Korea) Lee Seul-Gi	(South Korea) Pohang Steelers	Traded	
3 November 2011	FW	(South Korea) Kim Dong-Hee	(South Korea) Pohang Steelers	Traded	
9 November 2011	MF	(South Korea) Heo Beom-San	(South Korea) Woosuk University	Draft (1st)	
9 November 2011	MF	(South Korea) Hwang Myung-Kyu	(South Korea) Dongguk University	Draft (2nd)	
9 November 2011	DF	(South Korea) Lee Sang-Soo	(South Korea) Pai Chai University	Draft (5th)	
9 November 2011	MF	(South Korea) Kim Woo-Jin	(South Korea) Kyonggi University	Draft (6th)	
9 November 2011	FW	(South Korea) Kim Seul-Gi	(South Korea) Myongji University	Draft (Extra)	
9 November 2011	MF	(South Korea) Yoo Byung-Woon	(South Korea) Kwandong University	Draft (Extra)	
13 December 2011	DF	(South Korea) Hwang Do-Yeon	(South Korea) Chunnam Dragons	Traded (loan)	
13 December 2011	DF	(South Korea) Kim Jae-Hoon	(South Korea) Chunnam Dragons	Traded	
20 December 2011	FW	(South Korea) Chung Kyung-Ho	(South Korea) Gangwon FC	Undisclosed	
20 December 2011	DF	(South Korea) Lee Kwang-Hyun	(South Korea) Jeonbuk Hyundai Motors	Undisclosed	
20 December 2011	MF	(South Korea) Ji Kyung-Deuk	(South Korea) Incheon United FC	Free Agent	
20 December 2011	DF	(South Korea) Yoo Woo-Ram	(South Korea) Mokpo City FC	Free Agent	

=== Out ===
Date	Pos.	Player	To	Fee	Ref
End of 2011 season	MF	(South Korea) Lee Sang-Hyup	(South Korea) Jeju United	Loan End	
End of 2011 season	DF	(South Korea) Choi Hyun-Bin	(South Korea) FC Seoul	Loan End	
3 November 2011	FW	(South Korea) Park Sung-Ho	(South Korea) Pohang Steelers	Traded	
28 November 2011	MF	(South Korea) Kim Kyung-Kuk	Unattached	Free Agent	
28 November 2011	MF	(South Korea) Kim Do-yeon	Unattached	Free Agent	
28 November 2011	FW	(Brazil) Wagner	Unattached	Free Agent	
28 November 2011	DF	(South Korea) Yoon Sin-Young	Unattached	Free Agent	
28 November 2011	FW	(South Korea) Lee Je-Kyu	Unattached	Free Agent	
28 November 2011	MF	(South Korea) Lee Hyun-Ho	Unattached	Free Agent	
28 November 2011	MF	(South Korea) Cho Eui-Kwon	Unattached	Free Agent	
28 November 2011	MF	(South Korea) Choi Wang-Gil	Unattached	Free Agent	
13 December 2011	MF	(South Korea) Han Jae-Woong	(South Korea) Chunnam Dragons	Traded	
22 December 2011	FW	(South Korea) Kwak Chul-Ho	Unattached	Free Agent	
22 December 2011	FW	(South Korea) Kim Ji-min	Unattached	Free Agent	
22 December 2011	DF	(South Korea) Park Seon-Woo	Unattached	Free Agent	
22 December 2011	DF	(South Korea) Lee Sang-Hee	Unattached	Free Agent	
22 December 2011	MF	(South Korea) Yoo Min-Chul	Unattached	Free Agent	
22 December 2011	DF	(South Korea) Jun Sang-Hoon	Unattached	Free Agent	
22 December 2011	FW	(South Korea) Kim Jin-Sol	Unattached	Free Agent	
17 June 2012	FW	(Brazil) Leozinho	Unattached	Free Agent	

== Coaching staff ==
Position	Staff
Manager	(South Korea) Yoo Sang-Chul
Coach	(South Korea) Oh Ju-Po
Coach	(South Korea) Lim Wan-Seob
Trainer	(South Korea) Kim Kwang-Jae
Trainer	(South Korea) Lee Kyu-Sung
Team Doctor	(South Korea) Bae Sang-Won

Last updated: 4 March 2012
Source: Daejeon Citizen

== Match results ==
=== K-League ===
All times are Korea Standard Time (KST) – UTC+9

Date Round	Home	Score	Away	Location

4 March 1	Gyeongnam	3 – 0	Daejeon	Changwon, Gyeongnam
17:00	Yun Il-Rok 33'; Caíque Silva Rocha 68'; Kim In-Han 70'	Report		Stadium: Changwon Football Center; Attendance: 4,344; Referee: Ko Keum-Bok

11 March 2	Daejeon	0 – 1	Jeonbuk	Yuseong-gu, Daejeon
15:00		Report	Droguett 85'	Stadium: Daejeon World Cup Stadium; Attendance: 10,160; Referee: Mae Ho-Young

18 March 3	Seoul	2 – 0	Daejeon	Mapo-gu, Seoul
15:00	Molina 51', 78'	Report		Stadium: Seoul World Cup Stadium; Attendance: 20,622; Referee: Kim Dong-Jin

24 March 4	Incheon	2 – 1	Daejeon	Nam-gu, Incheon
17:00	Seol Ki-Hyeon 53', 61' (pen.)	Report	Heo Beom-San 66'	Stadium: Incheon Football Stadium; Attendance: 2,053; Referee: Yoo Sun-Ho

1 April 5	Daejeon	0 – 3	Jeju	Yuseong-gu, Daejeon
17:00		Report	Seo Dong-Hyun 12', 72'; Santos 23' (pen.)	Stadium: Daejeon World Cup Stadium; Attendance: 2,448; Referee: Lee Dong-Jun

7 April 6	Daejeon	0 – 1	Busan	Yuseong-gu, Daejeon
15:00		Report	Fagner 88'	Stadium: Daejeon World Cup Stadium; Attendance: 1,842; Referee: Kim Sang-Woo

11 April 7	Sangju	1 – 2	Daejeon	Sangju, Gyeongbuk
15:00	Yoo Chang-Hyun 55'	Report	Kim Chang-Hoon 10' (Assist by No.22); Baba 42' (Assist by No.22)	Stadium: Sangju Civic Stadium; Attendance: 1,627; Referee: Kim Jong-Hyuk

14 April 8	Daejeon	0 – 1	Seongnam	Yuseong-gu, Daejeon
15:00		Report	Lee Chang-Hoon 44'; Kim Sung-hwan (yellow card) 24' (yellow-red card) 45+1'	Stadium: Daejeon World Cup Stadium; Attendance: 2,488; Referee: Woo Sang-Il

22 April 9	Chunnam	3 – 1	Daejeon	Gwangyang, Jeonnam
15:00	Hong Jin-Gi 11'; Yoon Suk-Young 90'; Shim Dong-Woon 90+4'	Report	Kim Hyeung-Bum 74' (Free kick)	Stadium: Gwangyang Football Stadium; Attendance: 3,387; Referee: Choi Myung-Yong

28 April 10	Ulsan	2 – 0	Daejeon	Nam-gu, Ulsan
15:00	Maranhão 69', 78'	Report		Stadium: Ulsan Munsu Football Stadium; Attendance: 3,538; Referee: Kim Dae-Yong

5 May 11	Daejeon	2 – 1	Suwon	Yuseong-gu, Daejeon
15:00	Oris 22' (Assist by No.22); Chung Kyung-Ho (red card) 33'; Oris 90+3'	Report	Radončić 34' (pen.)	Stadium: Daejeon World Cup Stadium; Attendance: 8,031; Referee: Lee Dong-Jun

11 May 12	Pohang	0 – 0	Daejeon	Pohang, Gyeongbuk
19:30		Report		Stadium: Pohang Steel Yard; Attendance: 6,557; Referee: Woo Sang-Il

19 May 13	Daegu	1 – 1	Daejeon	Suseong-gu, Daegu
15:00	Song Je-Heon 57'	Report	Kim Hyeung-Bum 48' (pen.)	Stadium: Daegu Stadium; Attendance: 7,053; Referee: Ko Hyung-Jin

28 May 14	Daejeon	2 – 1	Gwangju	Yuseong-gu, Daejeon
15:00	Ji Kyeong-Deuk 8' (Assist by No.9); Oris 40' (Assist by No.13)	Report	João Paulo 69'	Stadium: Daejeon World Cup Stadium; Attendance: 5,112; Referee: Kim Dae-Yong

14 June 15	Gangwon	0 – 2	Daejeon	Chuncheon, Gangwon
19:30	Park Tae-Woong (yellow card) 21' (yellow-red card) 90+2'	Report	Oris 35'; Oris 37' (Assist by No.22)	Stadium: Chuncheon Stadium; Attendance: 2,400; Referee: Ko Keum-Bok

17 June 16	Daejeon	0 – 1	Chunnam	Yuseong-gu, Daejeon
17:00		Report	Shin Young-Jun 81'	Stadium: Daejeon World Cup Stadium; Attendance: 6,287; Referee: Kim Sang-Woo

23 June 17	Seongnam	0 – 3	Daejeon	Seongnam, Gyeonggi
19:00	Yoon Bit-Garam (red card) 90+4'	Report	Oris 2' (Assist by No.13); Kim Hyeung-Bum 17'; Kim Tae-Yeon 51' (Assist by No.22)	Stadium: Tancheon Sports Complex; Attendance: ? Referee: Lee Min-Hu

27 June 18	Daejeon	2 – 2	Daegu	Yuseong-gu, Daejeon
19:00	Kim Hyeung-Bum 11' (Assist by No.14); Oris 54' (Assist by No.22)	Report	Yoo Kyoung-Youl 5'; Dinélson 34'	Stadium: Daejeon World Cup Stadium; Attendance: 6,422; Referee: Ko Hyung-Jin

30 June 19	Busan	3 – 1	Daejeon	Yeonje-gu, Busan
19:00	Han Geuru 3' (o.g.); Yu Ji-Hun (yellow card) 27'; Kim Han-Yoon (yellow card) 33'; Park Yong-Ho 74'; Han Ji-Ho 80'	Report(Kor); Report(Eng)	Yuta Baba 33' (pen.), (yellow card) 61'; Han Geuru (yellow card) 47'; Heo Beom-San (yellow card) 54'; Kim Tae-Yeon (yellow card) 68'	Stadium: Busan Asiad Stadium; Attendance: 2,917; Referee: Choi Myung-Yong

11 July 20	Daejeon	0 – 3	Gangwon	Yuseong-gu, Daejeon
20:00			Wesley 31', 57', 68'	Stadium: Daejeon World Cup Stadium

15 July 21	Jeju	4 – 1	Daejeon	Seogwipo, Jeju
19:00	Santos 27'; Song Jin-Hyung 28', 66'; Seo Dong-Hyun 63'	Report	Baba 89' (pen.)	Stadium: Jeju World Cup Stadium

21 July 22	Daejeon	2 – 2	Sangju	Yuseong-gu, Daejeon
20:00	Kevin Oris 8'; Alex Terra 23'		Bang Dae-Jong 19'; Kim Yong-Tae 84'	Stadium: Daejeon World Cup Stadium

25 July 23	Daejeon	0 – 2	Seoul	Yuseong-gu, Daejeon
20:00	Lee Ho (yellow card) 26'; Kim Hyeung-Bum (yellow card) 40'; Chung Kyung-Ho (yellow card) 68'	report	Molina 33'; Damjanović 57'	Stadium: Daejeon World Cup Stadium; Attendance: 2,860; Referee: Kim Dong-Jin

28 July 24	Daejeon	0 – 0	Ulsan	Yuseong-gu, Daejeon
20:00	Alessandro (yellow card) 39'; Kevin Oris (yellow card) 90+1'	Report	Choi Sung-Hwan (yellow card) 41'; Estiven (yellow card) 65'	Stadium: Daejeon World Cup Stadium; Attendance: 3,039; Referee: Woo Sang-Il

5 August 25	Jeonbuk	0 – 1	Daejeon	Jeonju, Jeonbuk
19:00	Jin Kyung-Sun (yellow card) 77'	Report(Eng); Report(Kor)	Lee Woong-Hee (yellow card) 37'; Hwang Myung-Gyu (yellow card) 60'; Kevin Oris 64'	Stadium: Jeonju World Cup Stadium; Attendance: 10,463; Referee: Ahn Yong-Hee

9 August 26	Daejeon	0 – 2	Incheon	Yuseong-gu, Daejeon
19:00	Kevin Oris (yellow card) 37'; Yuta Baba (yellow card) 84'	Report(Eng); Report(Kor)	Park Jun-Tae 76'; Koo Bon-Sang (yellow card) 84'; Jung In-Hwan 87'	Stadium: Daejeon World Cup Stadium; Attendance: 7,583; Referee: Choi Myung-Yong

12 August 27	Daejeon	–	Gyeongnam	Yuseong-gu, Daejeon
18:00				Stadium: Daejeon World Cup Stadium

18 August 28	Gwangju	–	Daejeon	Nam-gu, Gwangju
20:00				Stadium: Gwangju World Cup Stadium

23 August 29	Suwon	–	Daejeon	Suwon, Gyeonggi
20:30				Stadium: Suwon World Cup Stadium

26 August 30	Daejeon	–	Pohang	Yuseong-gu, Daejeon
20:00				Stadium: Daejeon World Cup Stadium

==== League table ====
Pos	Team	Pld	W	D	L	GF	GA	GD	Pts	Qualification or relegation
11	Jeonnam Dragons	44	13	14	17	47	60	−13	53	
12	Seongnam Ilhwa Chunma	44	14	10	20	47	56	−9	52	
13	Daejeon Citizen	44	13	11	20	46	67	−21	50	
14	Gangwon FC	44	14	7	23	57	68	−11	49	
15	Gwangju FC (R)	44	10	15	19	57	67	−10	45	Relegation to the K League Challenge

Source: K League
Rules for classification: 1) Points; 2) Goal difference; 3) Goals scored.
(R) Relegated

==== Results summary ====
Overall								Home						Away					
Pld	W	D	L	GF	GA	GD	Pts	W	D	L	GF	GA	GD	W	D	L	GF	GA	GD
26	6	5	15	21	41	−20	23	2	3	8	8	20	−12	4	2	7	13	21	−8

==== Results by round ====
Round	1	2	3	4	5	6	7	8	9	10	11	12	13	14	15	16	17	18	19	20	21	22	23	24	25	26	27	28	29	30	31	32	33	34	35	36	37	38	39	40	41	42	43	44
Ground	A	H	A	A	H	H	A	H	A	A	H	A	A	H	A	H	A	H	A	H	A	H	H	H	A	H																		
Result	L	L	L	L	L	L	W	L	L	L	W	D	D	W	W	L	W	D	L	L	L	D	L	D	W	L																		
Position	16	16	16	16	16	16	16	16	16	16	16	16	16	15	14	15	13	13	14	16	16	16	16	16	14	16																		

Updated to match(es) played on 9 August 2012. Source: League Fixtures and Results
A = Away; H = Home; W = Win; D = Draw; L = Loss

=== Korean FA Cup ===
23 May Round of 32	Daejeon Citizen	2 – 1	Gyeongju Citizen	Yuseong-gu, Daejeon
19:00 KST	Baba 32' (pen.); Oris 36' (Assist by No.14)		Choi Seok-Min 44'	Stadium: Daejeon World Cup Stadium; Attendance: 878; Referee: Jo Hyeong-Taek

20 June Round of 16	Daejeon Citizen	2 – 2 (a.e.t.) (4 – 2 p)	Sangju Sangmu Phoenix	Yuseong-gu, Daejeon
19:00 KST	Kang Woo-Ram 26'; Oris 107'		Alessandro 67' (o.g.); Lee Sung-Jae 98'	Stadium: Daejeon World Cup Stadium; Attendance: 1,055; Referee: Lee Cheon-Su
	Penalties
	Kim Tae-Yeon (penalty scored); Kim Chang-Hoon (penalty scored); Han Geuru (penalty scored); Alessandro (penalty scored)		(penalty scored) Kim Chi-Gon; (penalty missed) Bang Dae-Jong; (penalty scored) Choi Hyo-Jin; (penalty missed) Kim Yong-Tae

1 August Quarterfinal	Daejeon Citizen	–	Jeju United	Yuseong-gu, Daejeon
20:30 KST				Stadium: Daejeon World Cup Stadium

== Squad statistics ==
=== Appearances ===
Statistics accurate as of match played 27 June 2012

No.	Nat.	Pos.	Name	League		FA Cup		Appearances		Goals
No.	Nat.	Pos.	Name	Apps	Goals	Apps	Goals	App (sub)	Total	Goals
1	(South Korea)	GK	Choi Hyun	4 (1)	0	1	0	5 (1)	6	0
2	(Brazil)	DF	Alessandro	6	0	1	0	7 (0)	7	0
3	(South Korea)	DF	Park Kun-Young	0	0	0	0	0	0	0
4	(South Korea)	DF	Yoo Woo-Ram	0	0	1	0	1 (0)	1	0
5	(South Korea)	MF	Kim Tae-Yeon	16	1	2	0	18 (0)	18	1
6	(South Korea)	MF	Lee Seul-Gi	1	0	0	0	1 (0)	1	0
7	(South Korea)	MF	Park Min-Keun	3 (3)	0	0	0	3 (3)	6	0
8	(South Korea)	FW	Kim Dong-Hee	0 (5)	0	0 (2)	0	0 (7)	7	0
9	(Belgium)	FW	Kevin Oris	14 (3)	7	2	2	16 (3)	19	9
10	(South Korea)	MF	Lee Hyun-Woong	12 (3)	0	1	0	13 (3)	16	0
12	(South Korea)	MF	Hwang Myung-Gyu	3 (5)	0	1	0	4 (5)	9	0
13	(South Korea)	DF	Kim Chang-Hoon	16	1	2	0	18 (0)	18	1
14	(Japan)	MF	Yuta Baba	11 (1)	1	2	1	13 (1)	14	2
15	(South Korea)	DF	Hwang Do-Yeon	0	0	0	0	0	0	0
16	(South Korea)	MF	Go Dae-Woo	1 (1)	0	0	0	1 (1)	2	0
17	(South Korea)	MF	Hwang Jin-San	1 (2)	0	1	0	2 (2)	4	0
18	(South Korea)	FW	Han Geu-Loo	1 (6)	0	0 (1)	0	1 (7)	8	0
19	(South Korea)	FW	Chung Kyung-Ho	11 (4)	0	2	0	13 (4)	17	0
20	(South Korea)	DF	Lee Ho	15	0	1	0	16 (0)	16	0
22	(South Korea)	FW	Kim Hyeung-Bum	10 (4)	4	0	0	10 (4)	14	4
23	(South Korea)	DF	Kang Woo-Ram	0	0	1	1	1 (0)	1	1
24	(South Korea)	MF	Heo Beom-San	5 (1)	1	0 (1)	0	5 (2)	7	1
25	(South Korea)	MF	Ji Kyeong-Deuk	14 (3)	1	0 (1)	0	14 (4)	18	1
26	(South Korea)	DF	Kim Jae-Hoon	6 (1)	0	1	0	7 (1)	8	0
27	(South Korea)	MF	Han Deok-Hee	6 (3)	0	0	0	6 (3)	9	0
28	(South Korea)	FW	Lee Sang-Su	0	0	0	0	0	0	0
29	(South Korea)	DF	Lee Kwang-Hyun	2	0	0	0	2 (0)	2	0
30	(South Korea)	FW	Han Kyung-In	6 (1)	0	0 (1)	0	6 (2)	8	0
31	(South Korea)	GK	Kim Sun-Kyu	14	0	1	0	15 (0)	15	0
33	(South Korea)	DF	Lee Woong-Hee	12	0	1	0	13 (0)	13	0
36	(South Korea)	MF	Kim Woo-Jin	0	0	0	0	0	0	0
37	(South Korea)	MF	Kim Seul-Gi	0	0	0	0	0	0	0
38	(South Korea)	MF	Yoo Byoung-Woon	0	0	0	0	0	0	0
41	(South Korea)	GK	Hong Sang-Jun	0	0	0	0	0	0	0
44	(South Korea)	FW	Namgung Do	3 (3)	0	0	0	3 (3)	6	0
11	(Brazil)	FW	Leozinho (out)	5 (4)	0	1	0	6 (4)	10	0

=== Goals and assists ===
Rank	Nation	Number	Name	K-League		KFA Cup		Sum		Total
Rank	Nation	Number	Name	Goals	Assists	Goals	Assists	Goals	Assists	Total
1	(Belgium)	9	Kevin Oris	7	1	2	0	9	1	10
=	(South Korea)	22	Kim Hyeung-Bum	4	6	0	0	4	6	10
2	(Japan)	14	Yuta Baba	1	1	1	1	2	2	4
3	(South Korea)	13	Kim Chang-Hoon	1	2	0	0	1	2	3
4	(South Korea)	5	Kim Tae-Yeon	1	0	0	0	1	0	1
=	(South Korea)	24	Heo Beom-San	1	0	0	0	1	0	1
=	(South Korea)	25	Ji Kyeong-Deuk	1	0	0	0	1	0	1
=	(South Korea)	23	Kang Woo-Ram	0	0	1	0	1	0	1
/	/	/	Own Goals	0	-	0	-	0	-	0
/	/	/	TOTALS	16	10	4	1	20	11	

=== Discipline ===
Position	Nation	Number	Name	K-League		KFA Cup		Total	
Position	Nation	Number	Name	Yellow card	Red card	Yellow card	Red card	Yellow card	Red card
DF	(Brazil)	2	Alessandro	3	0	0	0	3	0
MF	(South Korea)	5	Kim Tae-Yeon	3	0	1	0	4	0
MF	(South Korea)	7	Park Min-Keun	1	0	0	0	1	0
FW	(South Korea)	8	Kim Dong-Hee	0	0	1	0	1	0
FW	(Belgium)	9	Kevin Oris	3	0	0	0	3	0
MF	(South Korea)	10	Lee Hyun-Woong	2	0	0	0	2	0
FW	(Brazil)	11	Leozinho	1	0	0	0	1	0
MF	(South Korea)	12	Hwang Myung-Gyu	1	0	0	0	1	0
DF	(South Korea)	13	Kim Chang-Hoon	2	0	0	0	2	0
MF	(Japan)	14	Yuta Baba	2	0	2	0	4	0
DF	(South Korea)	20	Lee Ho	3	0	0	0	3	0
MF	(South Korea)	22	Kim Hyeung-Bum	1	0	0	0	1	0
MF	(South Korea)	24	Heo Beom-San	1	0	0	0	1	0
MF	(South Korea)	25	Ji Kyeong-Deuk	1	0	0	0	1	0
DF	(South Korea)	26	Kim Jae-Hoon	1	0	0	0	1	0
DF	(South Korea)	29	Lee Kwang-Hyun	1	0	0	0	1	0
FW	(South Korea)	30	Han Kyung-In	1	0	1	0	2	0
GK	(South Korea)	31	Kim Sun-Kyu	1	0	0	0	1	0
DF	(South Korea)	33	Lee Woong-Hee	1	0	0	0	1	0
/	/	/	TOTALS	29	0	5	0	34	0
