= List of South Korean football transfers winter 2011–12 =

This is a list of South Korean football transfers in the winter transfer window 2011–12.

== Transfers ==
Player	Position	Moving from	Moving to	Fee
Yeo Hyo-jin	Defender	FC Seoul	Busan IPark	
Bang Seung-hwan	Forward	FC Seoul	Busan IPark	
Kim Hyung-pil	Forward	Jeonnam Dragons	Busan IPark	
Jeon Jae-ho	Midfielder	Incheon United	Busan IPark	
Kang Dae-ho	Defender	Pohang Steelers	Busan IPark	
(Brazil) José Mota	Forward	(Norway) Molde	Busan IPark	
(Brazil) Fágner	Midfielder	(Brazil) Salgueiro	Busan IPark	
Hwang Sun-pil	Defender	Jeonnam Dragons	Busan IPark	
Park Yong-ho	Defender	FC Seoul	Busan IPark	
Kyung Jae-yoon (loan)	Midfielder	FC Seoul	Busan IPark	
(Australia) Matt McKay	Midfielder	(Scotland) Rangers	Busan IPark	
Ku Hyeon-jun	Defender	Unattached	Busan IPark	Free
Kim Ji-min (1993)	Forward	Unattached	Busan IPark	Free
Yu Su-cheol	Defender	Unattached	Busan IPark	Free
Yun Yeong-no	Defender	Unattached	Busan IPark	Free
Lee Hyeon-do	Midfielder	Unattached	Busan IPark	Free
Ju Se-jong	Defender	Unattached	Busan IPark	Free
Lee Chang-geun	Goalkeeper	Unattached	Busan IPark	Free
(Australia) Iain Fyfe	Defender	Busan IPark	(Australia) Adelaide United	Free
Kim Geun-cheol	Midfielder	Busan IPark	Jeonnam Dragons	
Lee Kil-hoon	Midfielder	Busan IPark	(China) Shenyang Dongjin	Free
Choo Sung-ho	Defender	Busan IPark	Gimhae City	Free
Yang Dong-hyun (draft)	Forward	Busan IPark	Korean Police	
Shin In-seob	Midfielder	Busan IPark		
Park Hee-do	Midfielder	Busan IPark	FC Seoul	
Kim Ji-hwan	Goalkeeper	Busan IPark	Bucheon FC 1995	Free
Shin Wan-hee	Forward	Busan IPark	Bucheon FC 1995	Free
Lee Se-in	Defender	Busan IPark	(China) Tianjin Songjiang	Free
Lee Dong-won	Defender	Busan IPark	(Thailand) Chainat	Free
(Brazil) Leleco	Midfielder	(Brazil) Velo Clube	Jeonnam Dragons	
Han Jae-woong	Defender	Daejeon Citizen	Jeonnam Dragons	
Kim Dae-ho	Goalkeeper	Ulsan Mipo Dockyard	Jeonnam Dragons	
(Brazil) Paulinho	Midfielder	(Brazil) Velo Clube	Jeonnam Dragons	
(Australia) Matt Simon	Forward	(Australia) Central Coast Mariners	Jeonnam Dragons	
Lee Hyun-seung	Midfielder	FC Seoul	Jeonnam Dragons	
Kim Shin-young	Forward	Unattached	Jeonnam Dragons	Free
Park Jung-hoon	Midfielder	Jeonbuk Hyundai Motors	Jeonnam Dragons	
Jung Myung-oh	Midfielder	Suwon City	Jeonnam Dragons	
Hong Jin-gi	Defender	Unattached	Jeonnam Dragons	Free
Shim Dong-woon	Forward	Unattached	Jeonnam Dragons	Free
Kim Dong-cheol	Defender	Unattached	Jeonnam Dragons	Free
Son Seol-min	Midfielder	Unattached	Jeonnam Dragons	Free
Lee Seul-chan	Defender	Unattached	Jeonnam Dragons	Free
Jeong Hyun-yoon	Defender	Unattached	Jeonnam Dragons	Free
Ju Sung-hwan	Forward	Unattached	Jeonnam Dragons	Free
Lee Jun-ki	Defender	Jeonnam Dragons	(Thailand) TOT	Free
Hwang Do-yeon (loan)	Defender	Jeonnam Dragons	Daejeon Citizen	
Kim Jae-hoon	Defender	Jeonnam Dragons	Daejeon Citizen	
Shin Jung-hwan	Goalkeeper	Jeonnam Dragons	Hyundai Mipo Dockyard	Free
Kim Myung-sun	Defender	Jeonnam Dragons	Yongin City	Free
Kim Se-hoon	Forward	Jeonnam Dragons	Seongnam Ilhwa Chunma	Free
Seo Ju-hang	Midfielder	Jeonnam Dragons		Free
Joo Hyun-woo	Midfielder	Jeonnam Dragons		Free
Baek Jin-mok	Defender	Jeonnam Dragons		Free
Kim Kyo-bin	Goalkeeper	Jeonnam Dragons	Daegu FC	Free
Kang Jin-kyu	Midfielder	Jeonnam Dragons	Busan Transportation Corporation	Free
Kwon Hyung-sun	Midfielder	Jeonnam Dragons		Free
Jang Yong-ik	Forward	Jeonnam Dragons	(Thailand) Nakhon Ratchasima	Free
Lee Nam-yong	Midfielder	Jeonnam Dragons	Seoul United	Free
Lee Byung-yoon	Midfielder	Jeonnam Dragons		Free
Kim Ki-soo	Midfielder	Busan IPark	Daegu FC	
Lee Jin-ho	Forward	Ulsan Hyundai	Daegu FC	
(Brazil) Dinélson	Midfielder	(Brazil) Avaí	Daegu FC	
(Brazil) Leandrinho	Midfielder	(Brazil) Avaí	Daegu FC	
(Brazil) Matheus Humberto	Midfielder	(Brazil) Avaí	Daegu FC	
Cho Young-hoon	Defender	Unattached	Daegu FC	Free
Hwang Soon-min	Midfielder	(Japan) Shonan Bellmare	Daegu FC	
Park Su-chang	Midfielder	Unattached	Daegu FC	Free
Jeong An-mo	Midfielder	Unattached	Daegu FC	Free
Kang Houn-young	Midfielder	Unattached	Daegu FC	Free
Lee Haeng-su	Forward	Unattached	Daegu FC	Free
Lee Youn-kyu	Goalkeeper	Unattached	Daegu FC	Free
Lim Sung-taek	Forward	Daegu FC	Suwon City	Free
Yoon Si-ho	Defender	Daegu FC	FC Seoul	Free
Lee Hyung-sang	Midfielder	Daegu FC	Gangneung City	Free
Choi Yoo-sang	Midfielder	Daegu FC	Yongin City	Free
Kim Jong-baek	Midfielder	Daegu FC		Free
Kim Dae-hun	Defender	Daegu FC	Gimhae City	Free
Kim Byung-gyu	Forward	Daegu FC		Free
Byun Yoon-chul	Forward	Daegu FC		Free
Min Ki	Midfielder	Daegu FC	Cheonan City	Free
Kim Hyeok	Defender	Daegu FC		Free
Jeon Ho-yeon	Midfielder	Daegu FC		Free
An Seuk-ho	Forward	Daegu FC		Free
Kim Joo-hwan	Midfielder	Daegu FC		Free
Park Jung-sik	Forward	Daegu FC		Free
Lee Seul-gi	Midfielder	Pohang Steelers	Daejeon Citizen	
Kim Dong-hee	Forward	Pohang Steelers	Daejeon Citizen	
Chung Kyung-ho	Midfielder	Gangwon FC	Daejeon Citizen	
Lee Kwang-hyun	Defender	Jeonbuk Hyundai Motors	Daejeon Citizen	
Ji Kyeong-deuk	Midfielder	Incheon United	Daejeon Citizen	Free
Yoo Woo-ram	Defender	Mokpo City	Daejeon Citizen	
Kim Hyeung-bum (loan)	Midfielder	Jeonbuk Hyundai Motors	Daejeon Citizen	
Han Geu-loo	Forward	Seongnam Ilhwa Chunma	Daejeon Citizen	
(Belgium) Kevin Oris	Forward	(Belgium) Royal Antwerp	Daejeon Citizen	
Han Kyung-in	Forward	Gyeongnam FC	Daejeon Citizen	Free
Kim Sun-kyu	Goalkeeper	Gyeongnam FC	Daejeon Citizen	Free
(Brazil) Leozinho	Forward	(Brazil) São Caetano	Daejeon Citizen	Free
Namkung Do (loan)	Forward	Seongnam Ilhwa Chunma	Daejeon Citizen	
Kang Woo-ram	Defender	Bucheon FC 1995	Daejeon Citizen	
(Brazil) Alessandro Lopes	Defender	(Brazil) Nacional-NS	Daejeon Citizen	
Heo Beom-san	Midfielder	Unattached	Daejeon Citizen	Free
Hwang Myung-gyu	Midfielder	Unattached	Daejeon Citizen	Free
Lee Sang-su	Forward	Unattached	Daejeon Citizen	Free
Kim Woo-jin	Midfielder	Unattached	Daejeon Citizen	Free
Kim Seul-gi	Midfielder	Unattached	Daejeon Citizen	Free
Yoo Byoung-woon	Midfielder	Unattached	Daejeon Citizen	Free
Hong Sang-jun	Goalkeeper	Unattached	Daejeon Citizen	Free
Kim Young-bin (draft)	Defender	Daejeon Citizen	Sangju Sangmu Phoenix	Free
Cho Hong-kyu	Defender	Daejeon Citizen		Free
Kim Seong-jun	Midfielder	Daejeon Citizen	Seongnam Ilhwa Chunma	
(Brazil) Wagner Querino	Forward	Daejeon Citizen	(Saudi Arabia) Al Nassr	Free
Park Sung-ho	Forward	Daejeon Citizen	Pohang Steelers	
Kim Jin-sol	Forward	Daejeon Citizen	Cheonan City	
Hwang Hun-hee	Forward	Daejeon Citizen		Free
Kang In-jun	Midfielder	Daejeon Citizen	Yongin City	Free
Jun Sang-hoon	Defender	Daejeon Citizen		Free
Jun Bo-hoon	Forward	Daejeon Citizen		Free
Kim Ju-hyoung	Forward	Daejeon Citizen	Suwon City	Free
Lee Hyun-ho (1987)	Midfielder	Daejeon Citizen		Free
Kim Jin-man	Defender	Daejeon Citizen		Free
Kim Do-yeon	Midfielder	Daejeon Citizen	(Thailand) Pattaya United	Free
Jung Gyu-jin	Goalkeeper	Daejeon Citizen	Daejeon KHNP	
Jung Yeon-woong (loan)	Forward	Daejeon Citizen	(Japan) V-Varen Nagasaki	
Noh Yong-hun	Midfielder	Daejeon Citizen	Gangwon FC	
Choi Wang-gil	Midfielder	Daejeon Citizen		Free
Cho Eui-kwon	Defender	Daejeon Citizen		Free
(China) Bai Zijian	Midfielder	Daejeon Citizen	Goyang Kookmin Bank	Free
Park Seon-woo	Defender	Daejeon Citizen		Free
Kim Ji-min (1984)	Forward	Daejeon Citizen		Free
Yoon Sin-young	Defender	Daejeon Citizen	Gyeongnam FC	Free
Kwak Chul-ho	Forward	Daejeon Citizen	Changwon City	Free
Lee Je-kyu	Forward	Daejeon Citizen	Suwon Samsung Bluewings	Free
Yoo Min-chul	Defender	Daejeon Citizen		Free
Bae Hyo-sung	Defender	Incheon United	Gangwon FC	
Kim Eun-jung	Forward	Jeju United	Gangwon FC	
Song Yoo-geol	Goalkeeper	Incheon United	Gangwon FC	
Oh Jae-seok	Defender	Suwon Samsung Bluewings	Gangwon FC	
Kim Tae-min	Midfielder	Jeju United	Gangwon FC	
Kim Myung-joong	Midfielder	Jeonnam Dragons	Gangwon FC	Free
Ham Min-seok	Defender	Bucheon FC 1995	Gangwon FC	
(Brazil) Weslley Smith (loan)	Forward	(Brazil) Corinthians B	Gangwon FC	
(Japan) Yusuke Shimada	Midfielder	(Japan) Tokushima Vortis	Gangwon FC	
Kim Do-hoon	Forward	Pohang Steelers	Gangwon FC	Free
Lee Jae-hun	Defender	Unattached	Gangwon FC	Free
Kim Dong-ki	Forward	Unattached	Gangwon FC	Free
Kim Joon-beom	Midfielder	Gangneung City	Gangwon FC	
Ko Min-joo	Forward	Unattached	Gangwon FC	Free
Na Byeong-hwan	Defender	Unattached	Gangwon FC	Free
Yang Yun-heok	Defender	Unattached	Gangwon FC	Free
Park Jae-bum	Forward	Goyang Citizen	Gangwon FC	
Moon Kyung-min	Midfielder	Unattached	Gangwon FC	Free
Lee Bong-jun	Defender	Gangneung City	Gangwon FC	
Kwak Kwang-seon	Defender	Gangwon FC	Suwon Samsung Bluewings	
Kim Young-hoo (draft)	Forward	Gangwon FC	Korean Police	Free
Kim Jin-yong (loan)	Forward	Gangwon FC	Pohang Steelers	
Ha Jung-heon	Midfielder	Gangwon FC	Goyang Kookmin Bank	Free
Nam Gwang-hyun	Midfielder	Gangwon FC	(Thailand) Suphanburi	Free
Seo Dong-hyun	Forward	Gangwon FC	Jeju United	
Yang Jung-min	Forward	Gangwon FC		Free
Moon Kyung-joo	Midfielder	Gangwon FC	Paju Citizen	Free
Park Jong-in (1992)	Defender	Gangwon FC		Free
Lee Kyung-soo	Defender	Gangwon FC		Free
Huh Min-hyuk	Forward	Gangwon FC		Free
Kim Seok	Midfielder	Gangwon FC		Free
Lee Hun	Midfielder	Gangwon FC		Free
Kim Woo-kyung	Midfielder	Gangwon FC		Free
Kim Sea-joon	Goalkeeper	Gangwon FC	Gyeongnam FC	
Lee Shin-kyu	Midfielder	Gangwon FC		Free
Kim Moon-soo (draft)	Defender	Gangwon FC	Korean Police	Free
Lee Jung-kwan	Forward	Gangwon FC		Free
Yoo Hyun	Goalkeeper	Gangwon FC	Incheon United	
Ahn Sung-nam	Midfielder	Gangwon FC	Gwangju FC	
Jang Kyung-jin	Defender	Incheon United	Gwangju FC	Free
Lee Jung-rae	Goalkeeper	Gyeongnam FC	Gwangju FC	
Park Min	Defender	Gyeongnam FC	Gwangju FC	Free
(Montenegro) Bogdan Milić	Forward	(Russia) Spartak Nalchik	Gwangju FC	
(Brazil) Adriano Chuva	Forward	Pohang Steelers	Gwangju FC	Free
Lee Han-saem	Defender	Unattached	Gwangju FC	Free
Park Jeong-min	Forward	Unattached	Gwangju FC	Free
Kang Min	Defender	Yongin City	Gwangju FC	
Yun Gi-hea	Goalkeeper	Unattached	Gwangju FC	Free
Park Jong-in (1988)	Forward	Unattached	Gwangju FC	Free
Yeo Reum	Defender	Unattached	Gwangju FC	Free
Moon Du-yun	Midfielder	Unattached	Gwangju FC	Free
Kim Seong-min	Forward	Gwangju FC		Free
Koh Eun-seong	Defender	Gwangju FC		Free
Jo Sang-jun (draft)	Goalkeeper	Gwangju FC	Korean Police	Free
Park Sung-hwa	Midfielder	Gwangju FC		Free
Kim Sung-min (draft)	Forward	Gwangju FC	Sangju Sangmu Phoenix	Free
Yoon Kwang-bok	Midfielder	Gwangju FC		Free
Kim Sung-min	Forward	Gwangju FC		Free
Park Sang-hyeon	Midfielder	Gwangju FC		Free
Lee Jae-chan	Midfielder	Gwangju FC		Free
(Brazil) Celin	Forward	Gwangju FC		Free
Yoo Ho-joon	Midfielder	Busan IPark	Gyeongnam FC	
Kim Min-hak	Defender	Jeonbuk Hyundai Motors	Gyeongnam FC	Free
(Brazil) Caíque (loan)	Midfielder	(Brazil) Vasco da Gama	Gyeongnam FC	
Jo Jae-cheol	Midfielder	Seongnam Ilhwa Chunma	Gyeongnam FC	
Kang Min-hyuk	Defender	Jeju United	Gyeongnam FC	
Ko Jae-sung	Defender	(China) Nanchang Hengyuan	Gyeongnam FC	
Lee Jae-an	Forward	FC Seoul	Gyeongnam FC	
(Brazil) Roni (loan)	Forward	(Brazil) São Paulo B	Gyeongnam FC	
Oh Byung-min	Defender	FC Seoul	Gyeongnam FC	Free
Kim Ji-woong	Midfielder	Jeonbuk Hyundai Motors	Gyeongnam FC	
Back Min-chul	Goalkeeper	Daegu FC	Gyeongnam FC	
Joo In-bae	Defender	Unattached	Gyeongnam FC	Free
Ha In-ho	Defender	Unattached	Gyeongnam FC	Free
Kim Hyun-gon	Midfielder	Unattached	Gyeongnam FC	Free
Lee Geun-pyo	Goalkeeper	Unattached	Gyeongnam FC	Free
Huh Young-suk	Midfielder	Unattached	Gyeongnam FC	Free
Nam Seol-hyeon	Midfielder	Unattached	Gyeongnam FC	Free
Tae Hyun-chan	Midfielder	Unattached	Gyeongnam FC	Free
Kim Bo-sung	Defender	Unattached	Gyeongnam FC	Free
Park Jae-hong	Defender	Gyeongnam FC	(Thailand) Police United	Free
Kim Joo-young	Defender	Gyeongnam FC	FC Seoul	
Yoon Bit-garam	Midfielder	Gyeongnam FC	Seongnam Ilhwa Chunma	
Lee Hea-kang	Defender	Gyeongnam FC		Free
Lee Kyung-ryul	Defender	Gyeongnam FC	Busan IPark	
Jeon Won-keun	Defender	Gyeongnam FC	Hyundai Mipo Dockyard	Free
Seo Sang-min	Midfielder	Gyeongnam FC	Jeonbuk Hyundai Motors	
Sim Jin-hyung	Midfielder	Gyeongnam FC	Gimhae City	Free
Kim Jin-hyun	Midfielder	Gyeongnam FC	Daejeon KHNP	Free
Kim Min-su	Defender	Gyeongnam FC		Free
Kim Jin-soo	Midfielder	Gyeongnam FC		Free
Oh Kwang-jin	Midfielder	Gyeongnam FC	Gimhae City	
Choi Sung-yong	Defender	Gyeongnam FC		Free
(Brazil) Morato	Midfielder	Gyeongnam FC		Free
Yoon Jun-ha	Forward	Gangwon FC	Incheon United	Free
Park Tae-min	Defender	Busan IPark	Incheon United	Free
Lee Hyo-kyun	Forward	Gyeongnam FC	Incheon United	Free
(Brazil) Ivo	Midfielder	(Brazil) Portuguesa	Incheon United	
Kim Tae-yoon	Defender	Seongnam Ilhwa Chunma	Incheon United	Free
Choi Jong-hoan	Midfielder	FC Seoul	Incheon United	
Seol Ki-hyeon	Forward	Ulsan Hyundai	Incheon United	Free
Kim Nam-il	Midfielder	(Russia) Tom Tomsk	Incheon United	Free
(Australia) Nathan Burns	Forward	(Greece) AEK Athens	Incheon United	Free
(Brazil) Ferdinando	Midfielder	(Brazil) Portuguesa	Incheon United	
Lee Kyu-ro	Midfielder	FC Seoul	Incheon United	
Kim Joo-bin	Defender	Unattached	Incheon United	Free
Lee Joon-ho	Defender	Unattached	Incheon United	Free
Koo Bon-sang	Midfielder	Unattached	Incheon United	Free
Kim Jae-yeon	Midfielder	Unattached	Incheon United	Free
Nam Il-woo	Midfielder	Unattached	Incheon United	Free
Hong Sun-man	Defender	Unattached	Incheon United	Free
Jung Jae-yoon	Defender	Unattached	Incheon United	Free
Kim Young-in	Defender	Unattached	Incheon United	Free
Moon Sang-yoon	Midfielder	Unattached	Incheon United	Free
Jin Sung-wook	Forward	Unattached	Incheon United	Free
Yoo Jae-ho	Defender	Unattached	Incheon United	Free
Jung Soo-woon	Forward	Unattached	Incheon United	Free
Cho Sung-tae	Midfielder	Unattached	Incheon United	Free
Kim Jung-in	Goalkeeper	Unattached	Incheon United	Free
Kim Sun-woo	Defender	Incheon United		Free
(Brazil) Fábio Bahia	Midfielder	Incheon United	(Brazil) Guarani	Free
Kim Myung-woon (draft)	Forward	Incheon United	Sangju Sangmu Phoenix	Free
(Brazil) Almir	Forward	Incheon United	(Brazil) Cabofriense	Free
(Brazil) Elionar	Forward	Incheon United	(Brazil) Comercial-SP	Free
Lee Jong-hyun	Midfielder	Incheon United	Gimhae City	Free
(Uzbekistan) Timur Kapadze	Midfielder	Incheon United	(United Arab Emirates) Al Sharjah	Free
Kim Seung-ho	Midfielder	Incheon United	Mokpo City	
Kwon Hyuk-jin (draft)	Forward	Incheon United	Korean Police	Free
Cho Bum-seok	Midfielder	Incheon United	Mokpo City	Free
Yoon Jin-ho	Goalkeeper	Incheon United		Free
Ahn Tae-eun	Defender	Incheon United		Free
Jeong Sun-bi	Forward	Incheon United	Cheonan City	Free
Lee Ho-chang	Midfielder	Incheon United		Free
Park Kyung-soon	Midfielder	Incheon United		Free
Park Ho-yong	Midfielder	Incheon United		Free
Cho Kwang-hoon	Defender	Incheon United		Free
Joo Ki-ho	Midfielder	Incheon United	Busan Transportation Corporation	Free
Lee Won-yong	Defender	Incheon United		Free
Kim Hyun-min	Forward	Incheon United		Free
Kwon Soon-hyung	Midfielder	Gangwon FC	Jeju United	
Song Ho-young	Forward	Seongnam Ilhwa Chunma	Jeju United	
Jeong Seok-min	Forward	Pohang Steelers	Jeju United	
Jung Kyung-ho	Midfielder	Jeonnam Dragons	Jeju United	Free
Park Byeong-ju	Defender	Gwangju FC	Jeju United	Free
Heo Jae-won	Defender	Gwangju FC	Jeju United	Free
(Brazil) Robert	Forward	(Brazil) Avaí	Jeju United	
(Australia) Adrian Madaschi	Defender	(Australia) Melbourne Heart	Jeju United	
Song Jin-hyung	Midfielder	(France) Tours	Jeju United	
Han Yong-su	Defender	Unattached	Jeju United	Free
Jin Dae-sung	Forward	Unattached	Jeju United	Free
Jang Jeong-hyun	Defender	Unattached	Jeju United	Free
Kim Sun-jin	Goalkeeper	Unattached	Jeju United	Free
Noh Sung-chan	Midfielder	Unattached	Jeju United	Free
Lee Sung-hyun	Defender	Unattached	Jeju United	Free
Bae Ki-jong (draft)	Forward	Jeju United	Korean Police	Free
Han Jae-man	Forward	Jeju United	Mokpo City	Free
Jung Da-seul	Midfielder	Jeju United	Goyang Kookmin Bank	Free
Kang Min-sung	Defender	Jeju United		Free
Lee Yoon-ho	Defender	Jeju United	Hyundai Mipo Dockyard	Free
Moon Min-kui	Midfielder	Jeju United		Free
Lee Gang-jin	Defender	(Japan) Júbilo Iwata	Jeonbuk Hyundai Motors	
Kim Jung-woo	Midfielder	Seongnam Ilhwa Chunma	Jeonbuk Hyundai Motors	Free
(Chile) Hugo Droguett (loan)	Midfielder	(Mexico) Cruz Azul	Jeonbuk Hyundai Motors	
Choi Eun-sung	Goalkeeper	Daejeon Citizen	Jeonbuk Hyundai Motors	Free
Park Se-jik	Midfielder	Unattached	Jeonbuk Hyundai Motors	Free
Kim Woo-chul	Midfielder	Unattached	Jeonbuk Hyundai Motors	Free
Kim Hyun	Forward	Unattached	Jeonbuk Hyundai Motors	Free
Jeong Jae-won	Forward	Unattached	Jeonbuk Hyundai Motors	Free
Kang Ju-ho	Midfielder	Unattached	Jeonbuk Hyundai Motors	Free
Hong Ju-bin	Forward	Unattached	Jeonbuk Hyundai Motors	Free
Youn Dong-kyu	Forward	Unattached	Jeonbuk Hyundai Motors	Free
Lee Hyeong-gi	Defender	Unattached	Jeonbuk Hyundai Motors	Free
Sin Hak-seob	Midfielder	Unattached	Jeonbuk Hyundai Motors	Free
Lee Dong-min	Midfielder	Unattached	Jeonbuk Hyundai Motors	Free
Son Seung-joon	Defender	Jeonbuk Hyundai Motors	(China) Henan Construction	
Kim Young-woo (draft)	Midfielder	Jeonbuk Hyundai Motors	Korean Police	Free
(Croatia) Krunoslav Lovrek	Forward	Jeonbuk Hyundai Motors	(China) Qingdao Jonoon	Free
Seo Jung-jin	Midfielder	Jeonbuk Hyundai Motors	Suwon Samsung Bluewings	
Kim Seung-rok	Defender	Jeonbuk Hyundai Motors		Free
Im Dong-jun	Defender	Jeonbuk Hyundai Motors		Free
Kim Kyung-min	Defender	Jeonbuk Hyundai Motors		Free
Kim Hak-jin	Defender	Jeonbuk Hyundai Motors	Hyundai Mipo Dockyard	Free
(Serbia) Zoran Rendulić	Defender	(Serbia) FK Javor Ivanjica	Pohang Steelers	
(Romania) Ianis Zicu	Forward	(Bulgaria) CSKA Sofia	Pohang Steelers	
Kim Chan-hee	Forward	Unattached	Pohang Steelers	Free
Yoon Jun-sung	Defender	Unattached	Pohang Steelers	Free
Bae Seul-ki	Defender	Unattached	Pohang Steelers	Free
Moon Gyu-hyun	Midfielder	Unattached	Pohang Steelers	Free
Moon Chang-jin	Midfielder	Unattached	Pohang Steelers	Free
Lee Kwang-hoon	Forward	Unattached	Pohang Steelers	Free
Lee Myung-joo	Midfielder	Unattached	Pohang Steelers	Free
Kim Eun-chong	Forward	Unattached	Pohang Steelers	Free
(Brazil) Mota	Forward	Pohang Steelers	(Brazil) Ceará	Free
Kang Jong-koo	Midfielder	Pohang Steelers	Gimhae City	
Jeong Jung-seuk (draft)	Forward	Pohang Steelers	Sangju Sangmu Phoenix	
Lee Sang-hoon	Midfielder	Pohang Steelers	Bucheon FC 1995	Free
Kim Dong-kwon (loan)	Defender	Pohang Steelers	Gimhae City	
Bang Dae-jong (draft)	Defender	Jeonnam Dragons	Sangju Sangmu Phoenix	Free
Lee Sang-hee (draft)	Defender	Daejeon Citizen	Sangju Sangmu Phoenix	Free
Kim Hong-il (draft)	Defender	Gwangju FC	Sangju Sangmu Phoenix	Free
Kim Ho-jun (draft)	Goalkeeper	Jeju United	Sangju Sangmu Phoenix	Free
Kim Young-sin (draft)	Midfielder	Jeju United	Sangju Sangmu Phoenix	Free
Ha Sung-min (draft)	Midfielder	Jeonbuk Hyundai Motors	Sangju Sangmu Phoenix	Free
Kim Jae-sung (draft)	Midfielder	Pohang Steelers	Sangju Sangmu Phoenix	Free
Jeong Jeong-seok (draft)	Forward	Pohang Steelers	Sangju Sangmu Phoenix	Free
Kim Hyung-il (draft)	Defender	Pohang Steelers	Sangju Sangmu Phoenix	Free
Kim Jung-bin (draft)	Midfielder	Pohang Steelers	Sangju Sangmu Phoenix	Free
Jeong Ho-jeong (draft)	Defender	Seongnam Ilhwa Chunma	Sangju Sangmu Phoenix	Free
Jang Suk-won (draft)	Defender	Seongnam Ilhwa Chunma	Sangju Sangmu Phoenix	Free
Yong Hyun-jin (draft)	Defender	Seongnam Ilhwa Chunma	Sangju Sangmu Phoenix	Free
Park Sang-hee (draft)	Midfielder	Seongnam Ilhwa Chunma	Sangju Sangmu Phoenix	Free
Kang Sung-kwan (draft)	Goalkeeper	Seongnam Ilhwa Chunma	Sangju Sangmu Phoenix	Free
Baek Ji-hoon (draft)	Midfielder	Suwon Samsung Bluewings	Sangju Sangmu Phoenix	Free
Lee Jong-sung (draft)	Forward	Suwon Samsung Bluewings	Sangju Sangmu Phoenix	Free
Shin Yeon-soo (draft)	Midfielder	Suwon Samsung Bluewings	Sangju Sangmu Phoenix	Free
Kim Sung-joon	Midfielder	Daejeon Citizen	Seongnam Ilhwa Chunma	
Lee Hyun-ho (1988)	Forward	Jeju United	Seongnam Ilhwa Chunma	
Han Sang-woon	Forward	Busan IPark	Seongnam Ilhwa Chunma	
(Serbia) Vladimir Jovančić	Forward	(Serbia) Partizan	Seongnam Ilhwa Chunma	
Lim Jong-eun	Defender	Ulsan Hyundai	Seongnam Ilhwa Chunma	
Hwang Jae-won	Defender	Suwon Samsung Bluewings	Seongnam Ilhwa Chunma	
Jeon Hyeon-chul	Forward	Unattached	Seongnam Ilhwa Chunma	Free
Kim Tea-yoo	Midfielder	Unattached	Seongnam Ilhwa Chunma	Free
Lee Jae-kwang	Defender	Unattached	Seongnam Ilhwa Chunma	Free
Park Se-young	Forward	Unattached	Seongnam Ilhwa Chunma	Free
Kim Hyun-woo	Forward	Unattached	Seongnam Ilhwa Chunma	Free
Kyun Hee-jae	Midfielder	Unattached	Seongnam Ilhwa Chunma	Free
Bae Ki-jin	Defender	Unattached	Seongnam Ilhwa Chunma	Free
Lee Chang-won	Defender	Unattached	Seongnam Ilhwa Chunma	Free
Jeon Kwan-woo	Midfielder	Unattached	Seongnam Ilhwa Chunma	Free
Kim Young-jae	Defender	Unattached	Seongnam Ilhwa Chunma	Free
Lee Young-hoon	Defender	Unattached	Seongnam Ilhwa Chunma	Free
Kim Young-nam	Midfielder	Unattached	Seongnam Ilhwa Chunma	Free
Yoo Jun-bong	Midfielder	Unattached	Seongnam Ilhwa Chunma	Free
Kwon Soon-kyu	Midfielder	Unattached	Seongnam Ilhwa Chunma	Free
Jung Da-un	Goalkeeper	Unattached	Seongnam Ilhwa Chunma	Free
Cho Dong-geon	Forward	Seongnam Ilhwa Chunma	Suwon Samsung Bluewings	
(Montenegro) Dženan Radončić	Forward	Seongnam Ilhwa Chunma	Suwon Samsung Bluewings	
Choi Yeon-keun	Midfielder	Seongnam Ilhwa Chunma		Free
Lee Chi-joon (draft)	Midfielder	Seongnam Ilhwa Chunma	Korean Police	Free
Park Ji-seung	Midfielder	Seongnam Ilhwa Chunma		Free
Song Sung-hyun	Defender	Seongnam Ilhwa Chunma		Free
Kim Jung-gwang	Forward	Seongnam Ilhwa Chunma	Gangneung City	Free
Lim Se-hyun	Midfielder	Seongnam Ilhwa Chunma	Daejeon KHNP	Free
Park Joon-hyun	Forward	Seongnam Ilhwa Chunma	Cheonan City	Free
Han Geuru	Forward	Seongnam Ilhwa Chunma	Daejeon Citizen	
Kim Tae-wang	Defender	Seongnam Ilhwa Chunma		Free
Yoon Man-ki	Midfielder	Seongnam Ilhwa Chunma		Free
Hong Jin-sub	Forward	Seongnam Ilhwa Chunma	(China) Yanbian Baekdu Tigers	Free
Jang Hak-young	Defender	Seongnam Ilhwa Chunma	Busan IPark	
Han Dong-won (loan)	Forward	Seongnam Ilhwa Chunma	Suwon Samsung Bluewings	
Kim Jin-kyu	Defender	(Japan) Ventforet Kofu	FC Seoul	Free
Lee Jae-kwon	Midfielder	Incheon United	FC Seoul	
Yoon Sung-woo	Midfielder	Unattached	FC Seoul	Free
Lee Taek-ki	Defender	Unattached	FC Seoul	Free
Kim Yong-chan	Defender	Unattached	FC Seoul	Free
Joo Ik-sung	Midfielder	Unattached	FC Seoul	Free
Yoo Sang-hee	Midfielder	Unattached	FC Seoul	Free
Kwak Joong-geun	Forward	Unattached	FC Seoul	Free
Lee Seung-kyu	Goalkeeper	Unattached	FC Seoul	Free
Cho Ho-yeon	Midfielder	Unattached	FC Seoul	Free
Jang Hyun-woo	Defender	Unattached	FC Seoul	Free
Kim Won-sik	Defender	Unattached	FC Seoul	Free
Cho Min-woo	Defender	Unattached	FC Seoul	Free
Kim Dong-jin	Defender	FC Seoul	(China) Hangzhou Greentown	
Bae Hae-min	Midfielder	FC Seoul	Daejeon KHNP	Free
Lee Seung-yeoul	Forward	FC Seoul	(Japan) Gamba Osaka	
Kim Ki-baek	Defender	FC Seoul		Free
Choi Won-wook (draft)	Defender	FC Seoul	Korean Police	Free
Cho Nam-kee (draft)	Midfielder	FC Seoul	Korean Police	Free
Lee Han-wool	Midfielder	FC Seoul	Seoul United	Free
Kim Dong-hyo	Forward	FC Seoul		Free
(Australia) Eddy Bosnar	Defender	(Japan) Shimizu S-Pulse	Suwon Samsung Bluewings	
(Brazil) Éverton Cardoso (loan)	Forward	(Mexico) UANL Tigres	Suwon Samsung Bluewings	
Ahn Young-gyu	Defender	Unattached	Suwon Samsung Bluewings	Free
Park Yong-jae	Midfielder	Unattached	Suwon Samsung Bluewings	Free
Choi Nag-min	Forward	Unattached	Suwon Samsung Bluewings	Free
Lee Jin-woo	Midfielder	Unattached	Suwon Samsung Bluewings	Free
Lee Kyung-soon	Defender	Unattached	Suwon Samsung Bluewings	Free
Kim Kwan-chul	Defender	Unattached	Suwon Samsung Bluewings	Free
Park Jun-seoung	Defender	Unattached	Suwon Samsung Bluewings	Free
Jeon Gun-jong	Forward	Unattached	Suwon Samsung Bluewings	Free
Kim Jae-hwan	Defender	Unattached	Suwon Samsung Bluewings	Free
(Croatia) Mato Neretljak	Defender	Suwon Samsung Bluewings	(Croatia) Hajduk Split	Free
Lee Sang-ho (loan)	Midfielder	Suwon Samsung Bluewings	(United Arab Emirates) Al Sharjah	
Yeom Ki-hun (draft)	Forward	Suwon Samsung Bluewings	Korean Police	Free
Lee Jae-il	Midfielder	Suwon Samsung Bluewings	Cheonan City	Free
Kim Seung-min	Defender	Suwon Samsung Bluewings		Free
Koo Ja-ryoung (draft)	Defender	Suwon Samsung Bluewings	Korean Police	Free
Shin Kyung-mo	Forward	Suwon Samsung Bluewings	Hyundai Mipo Dockyard	Free
Lee Chong-hee	Midfielder	Suwon Samsung Bluewings		Free
Huh Chung-san	Defender	Suwon Samsung Bluewings		Free
Kim Seung-yong	Midfielder	(Japan) Gamba Osaka	Ulsan Hyundai	
Lee Keun-ho	Forward	(Japan) Gamba Osaka	Ulsan Hyundai	
(Japan) Akihiro Ienaga (loan)	Midfielder	(Spain) RCD Mallorca	Ulsan Hyundai	
(Brazil) Maranhão (loan)	Forward	(Japan) Ventforet Kofu	Ulsan Hyundai	
Kim Hyun-gi	Midfielder	Unattached	Ulsan Hyundai	Free
Jung Jang-hoon	Midfielder	Unattached	Ulsan Hyundai	Free
Lee Dong-hyun	Midfielder	Unattached	Ulsan Hyundai	Free
Chung Woon	Defender	Unattached	Ulsan Hyundai	Free
Kim Nam-geol	Defender	Unattached	Ulsan Hyundai	Free
(Brazil) Lúcio Curió	Forward	Ulsan Hyundai	(Brazil) América-RN	Free
Choi Moo-lim	Goalkeeper	Ulsan Hyundai	Hyundai Mipo Dockyard	
(Brazil) Marcos Vinicius	Defender	Ulsan Hyundai	(Brazil) Taubaté	Free
Yoo Yong-won	Midfielder	Ulsan Hyundai		Free
Yang Min-hyuk	Forward	Ulsan Hyundai	Gimhae City	Free
Chun Won-goo	Defender	Ulsan Hyundai	Goyang Kookmin Bank	Free
