= Ha (Korean surname) =

- Hangul: 하
- Hanja: 河; 夏
- RR: Ha
- MR: Ha

Ha is a Latin alphabet rendition of the Korean family name "하", also often spelled Hah or less commonly as Har. As of the South Korean census of 2000, there were 213,758 people by this name in South Korea, or roughly 0.5% of the population.

== Clans ==
The bon-gwan, or clan homes, of the three most representative clans include Jinju, Ganghwa, and Aneum, the present-day Hamyang.

Jinju Ha clan is divided into Shirang branch (시랑공파, 侍郞公波) founded by Ha Gong-jin (하공진, 河拱辰), Sajik branch (사직공파, 司直公波) founded by and Ha Jin (하진, 河珍), and Dangye branch (단계공파, 丹溪公波) founded by Ha Seong (하성, 河成). Although the three branches seemed to have shared the single common ancestor at one point at least in Silla era, it is unclear which branch was the earliest to emerge. All of the three founders served as the officials during Goryeo era. The clan is sometimes referred as Jinyang Ha clan as Jinyang was the old name for the City of Jinju.

Ganghwa Ha clan is founded by Ha Il-cheong (하일청, 河一淸), the son of the Joseon official Ha Se-ryeon (하세련, 河世璉). Ha Il-cheong passed the civil official examination in 1570 and later became the governor. The clan's modern population in 2000 was 913.

Aneum Ha clan trace its founder to Ha Cheon-jo (하천조, 河千朝), who passed the civil official examination in 1212 during Goryeo era and served as the country's official. The clan's modern population in 2000 was 171.

== Notable people ==
=== Entertainment ===
- Haha (entertainer) (born Ha Dong-hoon, 1979), South Korean entertainer
- Ha Dong-kyun (born 1980), South Korean singer
- Gene Ha, Korean-American comic artist
- Ha Hee-ra (born 1969), South Korean actress
- Ha Hyun-woo (born 1981), South Korean singer-songwriter, member of rock band Guckkasten
- Ha Hyun-sang (born 1998), South Korean singer-songwriter
- Ha Il-kwon (born 1982), South Korean webcomic artist
- Ha Jae-sook (born 1979), South Korean actress
- Ha Ji-won (born 1978), South Korean actress
- Ha Joo-hee (born 1982), South Korean actress
- Ha Jung-woo (born 1978), South Korean actor
- Hah Myung-joong (born 1947), South Korean actor
- Ha Po-gyong (1906–1996), South Korean dancer
- Ha Seok-jin (born 1982), South Korean actor
- Ha Soo-bin (born 1973), South Korean singer-songwriter
- Yves (born Ha Soo-young, 1997), South Korean singer-songwriter, former member of girl group LOONA and it's sub-unit LOONA yyxy
- Ha Seung-ri (born 1995), South Korean actress
- Ha Sung-woon (born 1994), South Korean singer
- Ha Yeon-joo (born 1987), South Korean actress
- Ha Yeon-soo (born 1990), South Korean actress
- Yerin Ha (born 1995), Australian actress
- Ha Yoo-mi (born 1965), South Korean actress
- Ha Yoon-kyung (born 1992), South Korean actress

=== Literature ===
- Ha Geun-chan (1931–2007), South Korean writer
- Ha Seung-moo (born 1963), South Korean pastor, educator and theologian
- Ha Seong-nan (born 1967), South Korean writer
- Robin Ha, Korean-American writer
- Thomas Ha, Korean/Irish-American writer

=== Politics and government ===
- Ha Ryun (1347–1416), Joseon politician and Neo-Confucian scholar
- Ha Wiji (1387–1456), Joseon scholar-official

=== Sport ===
- Ha Jung-won (born 1942), North Korean football player
- Ha Hyung-joo (born 1962), South Korean judoka
- Ha Jae-hoon (footballer, born 1965), South Korean football player
- Ha Su-gyeong (born 1969), South Korean synchronized swimmer
- Ha Tae-yeon (born 1976), South Korean wrestler
- Ha Jae-hoon (footballer, born 1984), South Korean football player
- Ha Dae-sung (born 1985), South Korean football player
- Ha Dae-won (born 1985), South Korean football player
- Ha Seung-jin (born 1985), South Korean basketball player
- Ha Eun-ju (born 1986), South Korean swimmer
- Ha Jung-eun (born 1987), South Korean badminton player
- Ha Jung-heon (born 1987), South Korean football player
- Ha Sung-min (born 1987), South Korean football player
- Ha Tae-kyun (born 1987), South Korean football player
- Ha In-ho (born 1989), South Korean footballer
- Ha Jun-im (born 1989), South Korean volleyball player
- Ha Kang-jin (born 1989), South Korean football player
