= Kim Bo-kyung (disambiguation) =

- Hangul: 김보경
- RR: Gim Bogyeong
- MR: Kim Pogyŏng

Kim Bo-kyung (born 1989) is a South Korean footballer.

- Kim Bo-kyung (actress) (1976-2021), South Korean actress
- Kim Bo-kyung, birth name of the singer Stephanie in the South Korean band The Grace

== See also ==
- Kim (Korean surname), family name
- Bo-kyung, given name
