= Leozinho =

Leozinho is a nickname. It may refer to:

- Leozinho (fighter) (born 1976), Leonardo Alcantara Vieira, Brazilian grappler and Jiu-Jitsu instructor
- Leozinho (footballer, born 1985), Leandro Sales de Santana, Brazilian football attacking midfielder
- Leozinho (footballer, born 1988), Leonardo Ferreira, Brazilian football attacking midfielder
- Leozinho (footballer, born 1991), Leonardo dos Santos Lima, Brazilian football forward
- Leozinho (footballer, born 1998), Leonardo Caetano Silva, Brazilian football forward and former futsal player
