= Choi Hyun =

South Korean footballer

Personal information
- Date of birth: 7 November 1978 (age 47)
- Place of birth: Busan, South Korea
- Height: 1.92 m (6 ft 4 in)
- Position: Goalkeeper

Youth career
- 1994–1996: Donga Technical High School
- 1997–2000: Chungang University

Senior career*
Years	Team	Apps	(Gls)
2001–2007	Bucheon SK / Jeju United	49	(0)
2008	Gyeongnam FC	0	(0)
2008–2010	Busan I'Park	30	(0)
2011–2012	Daejeon Citizen	10	(0)

International career
1997	South Korea U-20	0	(0)
2000	South Korea U-23	0	(0)
- * Club domestic league appearances and goals

- Choi Hyun
- Hangul: 최현
- Hanja: 崔炫
- RR: Choe Hyeon
- MR: Ch'oe Hyŏn

Choi Hyun (Korean: 최현; born 7 November 1978) is a retired South Korean footballer who played as goalkeeper.

== Club career ==
He formerly played for Jeju United, Busan IPark and Daejeon Citizen.

== Career statistics ==
=== Club ===
Club performance			League		Cup		League Cup		Continental		Total	
Season	Club	League	Apps	Goals	Apps	Goals	Apps	Goals	Apps	Goals	Apps	Goals
South Korea			League		KFA Cup		League Cup		Asia		Total	
2001	Bucheon SK	K-League	0	0	?	?	0	0	-			
2002	Bucheon SK	K-League	18	0	?	?	8	0	-			
2003	Bucheon SK	K-League	13	0	0	0	-		-		13	0
2004	Bucheon SK	K-League	0	0	0	0	0	0	-		0	0
2005	Bucheon SK	K-League	0	0	2	0	0	0	-		2	0
2006	Jeju United	K-League	7	0	1	0	0	0	-		8	0
2007	Jeju United	K-League	11	0	2	0	5	0	-		18	0
2008	Gyeongnam FC	K-League	0	0	0	0	0	0	-		0	0
2008	Busan I'Park	K-League	4	0	0	0	0	0	-		4	0
2009	Busan I'Park	K-League	25	0	1	0	8	0	-		34	0
2010	Busan I'Park	K-League	1	0	0	0	0	0	-		1	0
2011	Daejeon Citizen	K-League	2	0	1	0	3	0	-		6	0
2012	Daejeon Citizen	K-League	8	0	0	0	-		-		8	0
Career total			89	0	7	0	24	0	-		120	0
