= Han Kyung-in =

South Korean footballer (born 1987)

Han Kyung-In
Personal information
- Date of birth: 28 May 1987 (age 39)
- Place of birth: Ulsan, South Korea
- Height: 1.80 m (5 ft 11 in)
- Position: Forward

Team information
- Current team: Shan United F.C.
- Number: 77

Youth career
- Myongji University

Senior career*
Years	Team	Apps	(Gls)
2011	Gyeongnam FC	18	(1)
2012–2015	Daejeon Citizen	18	(3)
2014–2015	→ Sangju Sangmu (army)	10	(0)
2016	Daejeon Korail FC		
2017	Gyeongju Citizen FC		
2017–	Shan United F.C.	0	(0)
- * Club domestic league appearances and goals as of May 2017

Han Kyung-In (Korean: 한경인; born 28 May 1987) is a South Korean football forward who plays for Shan United F.C. in the Myanmar National League.

== Club career ==
Han joined Gyeongnam FC from Myongji University as part of their squad for the 2011 season. His professional debut came as a second-half substitute in his club's 2011 K-League Cup match against Seongnam Ilhwa Chunma, which ended in a 0 - 0 draw. Within a month, Han scored his first K-League goal in Gyeongnam's 2 - 1 away win over Suwon.

On 27 January 2012, Han moved to fellow K-League side Daejeon Citizen along with his teammate Kim Sun-Kyu.

== Club career statistics ==
As of 16 December 2013

Club performance			League		Cup		League Cup		Total	
Season	Club	League	Apps	Goals	Apps	Goals	Apps	Goals	Apps	Goals
South Korea			League		KFA Cup		League Cup		Total	
2011	Gyeongnam FC	K-League	18	1	1	1	5	1	24	3
2012	Daejeon Citizen	K-League	12	1	1	0	-		13	1
2013	Daejeon Citizen	K League Classic	6	2	0	0	-		6	2
Career total			36	4	2	1	5	1	43	6
