= Bo-kyung =

- Hangul: 보경
- RR: Bogyeong
- MR: Pogyŏng

Bo-kyung is a Korean given name.

People with this name include:

- Ha Po-gyong (1906–1996), South Korean dancer
- Ok So-ri (born Ok Bo-gyeong, 1968), South Korean actress
- Kim Bo-kyung (actress) (1976–2021), South Korean actress
- Stephanie Kim (born Kim Bo-kyung, 1987), South Korean singer, member of girl group The Grace
- Choi Bo-kyung (born 1988), South Korean football player
- Kim Bo-kyung (born 1989), South Korean football player
- Lydia Ko (born Ko Bo-kyung, 1997), South Korean-born New Zealand golfer

Fictional characters with this name include:

- Yoon Bo-kyung, character in 2012 South Korean television series Moon Embracing the Sun

== See also ==
- List of Korean given names
