= Kim Chang-hoon =

South Korean footballer (born 1987)

Kim Chang-Hoon
Personal information
- Full name: Kim Chang-Hoon
- Date of birth: 3 April 1987 (age 39)
- Place of birth: South Korea
- Height: 1.83 m (6 ft 0 in)
- Position: Defender

Team information
- Current team: Ulsan Hyundai Mipo Dolphin FC
- Number: 33

Senior career*
| Years | Team | Apps | (Gls) |
| 2008 | Jeju United | 0 | (0) |
| 2009–2010 | Pohang Steelers | 9 | (1) |
| 2011–2012 | Daejeon Citizen | 66 | (3) |
| 2013–2015 | Incheon United | 14 | (0) |
| 2014–2015 | → Sangju Sangmu (army) | 14 | (1) |
| 2015 | Changwon FC | 0 | (0) |
| 2016– | Ulsan Hyundai Mipo Dolphin FC | 0 | (0) |

International career
| 2005 | South Korea U-20 | 2 | (0) |
| 2005 | South Korea U-23 | 2 | (0) |
- * Club domestic league appearances and goals as of 13 October 2015

- Kim Chang-hoon
- Hangul: 김창훈
- Hanja: 金彰勳
- RR: Gim Changhun
- MR: Kim Ch'anghun

Kim Chang-Hoon (Korean: 김창훈; born 3 April 1987) is a South Korean football player who plays for Incheon United, having previously played for Pohang Steelers and Jeju United.

== Club career ==
Kim was selected by Jeju United as a draft player for the 2008 K-League season. He played only a single match for the club (a K-League Cup game), and moved to the Pohang Steelers for 2009. As a squad player, he made intermittent appearances for Pohang throughout 2009, including two appearances in the Asian Champions League. Unfortunately, Kim only made a single appearance in 2010, as a substitute in a K-League Cup match against his former club Jeju United.

== Club career statistics ==
As of 1 February 2014

| Club performance | | | League | | Cup | | League Cup | | Continental | | Total | |
| Season | Club | League | Apps | Goals | Apps | Goals | Apps | Goals | Apps | Goals | Apps | Goals |
| South Korea | | | League | | KFA Cup | | League Cup | | Asia | | Total | |
|---|---|---|---|---|---|---|---|---|---|---|---|---|
| 2008 | Jeju United | K-League | 0 | 0 | 0 | 0 | 1 | 0 | – | | 1 | 0 |
| 2009 | Pohang Steelers | K-League | 8 | 1 | 2 | 0 | 0 | 0 | 2 | 0 | 12 | 1 |
| 2010 | Pohang Steelers | K-League | 1 | 0 | 0 | 0 | 0 | 0 | 0 | 0 | 1 | 0 |
| 2011 | Daejeon Citizen | K-League | 28 | 1 | 2 | 0 | 1 | 0 | 0 | 0 | 31 | 1 |
| 2012 | Daejeon Citizen | K-League | 38 | 2 | 2 | 0 | 0 | 0 | 0 | 0 | 40 | 2 |
| 2013 | Incheon United | K-League | 14 | 0 | 0 | 0 | 0 | 0 | 0 | 0 | 14 | 0 |
| Career total | | | 89 | 4 | 6 | 0 | 2 | 0 | 2 | 0 | 99 | 4 |
