= Lee Woong-hee =

South Korean footballer (born 1988)

Lee Woong-Hee
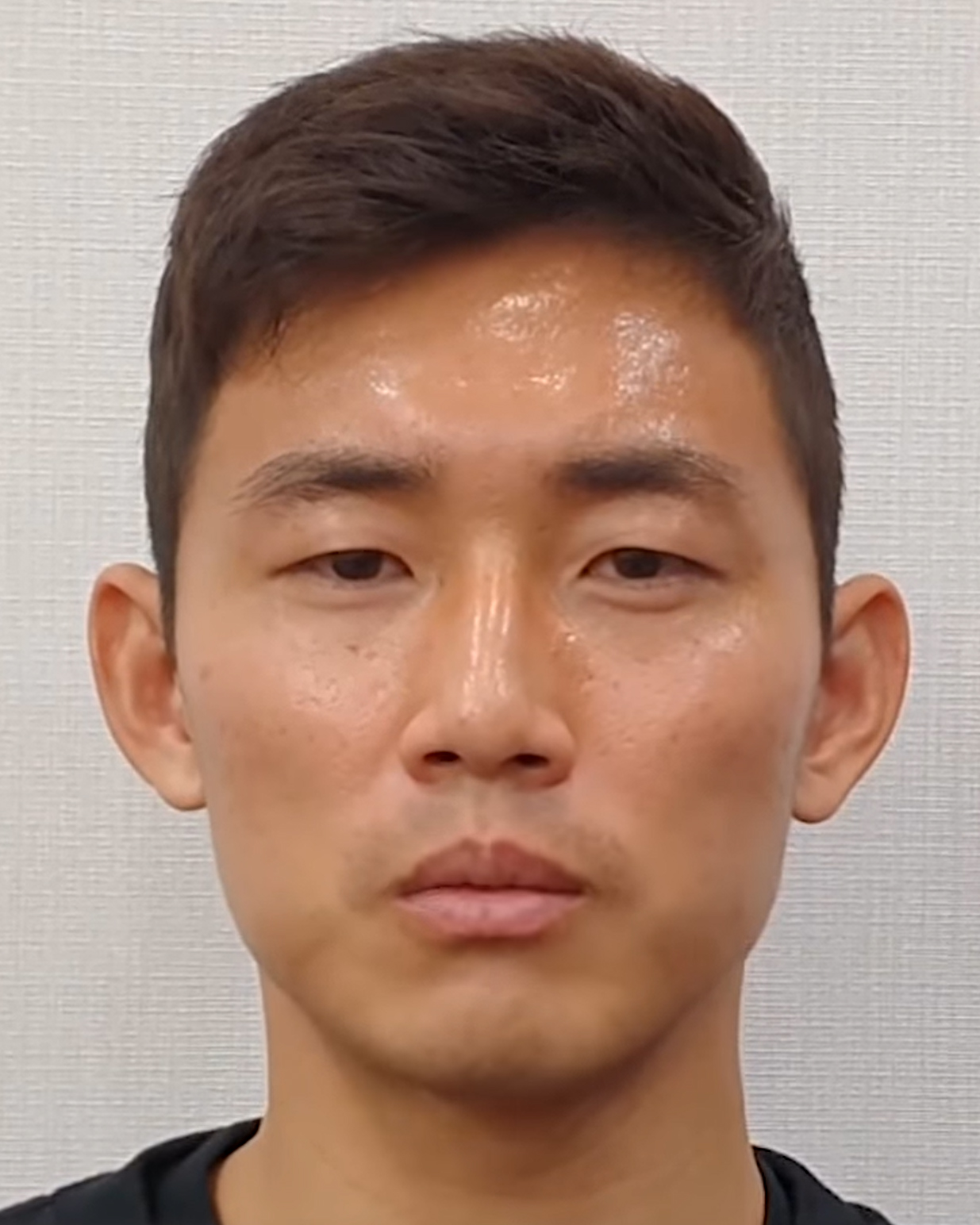
- Lee in 2020

Personal information
- Full name: Lee Woong-Hee
- Date of birth: 18 July 1988 (age 38)
- Place of birth: South Korea
- Height: 1.82 m (5 ft 11 1/2 in)
- Position: Defender

Team information
- Current team: Cheonan City FC
- Number: 3

Youth career
- 2007–2010: Pai Chai University

Senior career*
Years	Team	Apps	(Gls)
2011–2013	Daejeon Citizen	79	(4)
2014–2020	FC Seoul	92	(0)
2016–2017	→ Sangju Sangmu (army)	28	(2)
2020–2021	Daejeon Hana Citizen	35	(1)
2022–2023	Gangwon FC B	6	(1)
2022–2023	Gangwon FC	22	(1)
2024–	Cheonan City FC	61	(2)
- * Club domestic league appearances and goals as of 7 January 2026

Lee Woong-Hee (Korean: 이웅희; born 18 July 1988) is a South Korean football defender for Cheonan City FC.

== Club career ==
Lee, a draftee from the 2011 K-League draft intake, was selected by Daejeon Citizen for the 2011 season. His first appearance for Daejeon Citizen was in the club's first round match of the K-League Cup, against Incheon United. The match ended with Daejeon losing 0 - 3, with Lee being substituted early in the second half. His debut in the K-League was as a late substitute in Daejeon's match against Jeju United on 10 April 2011.

In January 2014 Lee moved from newly relegated Daejeon Citizen to FC Seoul.

== Career statistics ==
As of match played on 9 November 2024

Appearances and goals by club, season and competition
Club	Season	League			National Cup		League Cup		Continental		Other		Total	
Club	Season	Division	Apps	Goals	Apps	Goals	Apps	Goals	Apps	Goals	Apps	Goals	Apps	Goals
Daejeon Citizen	2011	K-League	13	1	0	0	4	0	—		—		17	1
Daejeon Citizen	2012	K-League	34	0	2	0	—		—		—		36	0
Daejeon Citizen	2013	K League Classic	32	3	0	0	—		—		—		32	3
Daejeon Citizen	Total		79	4	2	0	4	0	—		—		85	4
FC Seoul	2014	K League Classic	24	0	5	1	—		5 (Note: Appearances in the AFC Champions League)	0	—		34	1
FC Seoul	2015	K League Classic	32	0	3	0	—		8	1	—		43	1
FC Seoul	2017	K League Classic	5	0	0	0	—		—		—		5	0
FC Seoul	2018	K League 1	11	0	1	0	—		—		2 (Note: Appearances in the 2018 K League 1 Relegation play-offs)	0	14	0
FC Seoul	2019	K League 1	20	0	1	0	—		—		—		21	0
FC Seoul	2020	K League 1	—		—		—		0	0	—		21	0
FC Seoul	Total		92	0	10	1	—		13	1	2	0	117	2
Sangju Sangmu (loan)	2016	K League Classic	23	2	0	0	—		—		—		23	2
Sangju Sangmu (loan)	2017	K League Classic	5	0	0	0	—		—		—		5	0
Sangju Sangmu (loan)	Total		28	2	0	0	—		—		—		28	2
Daejeon Hana Citizen	2020	K League 2	15	0	1	0	—		—		1 (Note: Appearance in the 2020 K League 2 Promotion play-offs)	0	17	0
Daejeon Hana Citizen	2021	K League 2	20	1	1	0	—		—		4 (Note: Appearances in the 2021 K League 1 Promotion-relegation play-offs)	0	25	1
Daejeon Hana Citizen	Total		35	1	2	0	—		—		5	0	42	1
Gangwon FC B	2022	K4 League	4	1	—		—		—		—		4	1
Gangwon FC B	2023	K4 League	2	0	—		—		—		—		2	0
Gangwon FC B	Total		6	1	—		—		—		—		6	1
Gangwon FC	2022	K League 1	11	0	0	0	—		—		—		11	0
Gangwon FC	2023	K League 1	11	1	0	0	—		—		0	0	11	1
Gangwon FC	Total		22	1	0	0	—		—		0	0	22	1
Cheonan City FC	2024	K League 2	32	1	1	0	—		—		—		33	1
Career totals			294	10	15	1	4	0	13	1	7	0	333	12
