= Hwang Ji-woong =

South Korean footballer

Hwang Ji-Woong
Personal information
- Full name: Hwang Ji-Woong
- Date of birth: 30 April 1989 (age 37)
- Place of birth: South Korea
- Height: 1.75 m (5 ft 9 in)
- Position: Forward

Team information
- Current team: Daejeon Citizen
- Number: 11

Youth career
- Dongguk University

Senior career*
| Years | Team | Apps | (Gls) |
| 2012– | Daejeon Citizen | 81 | (4) |
| 2016–2017 | → Asan Mugunghwa (loan) | 23 | (2) |
- * Club domestic league appearances and goals as of 1 January 2018

Hwang Ji-Woong (Korean: 황지웅; born 30 April 1989) is a South Korean footballer who plays as a forward for Daejeon Citizen in the K League Challenge.
