= Ha In-ho =

South Korean footballer

Personal information
- Full name: Ha In-ho
- Date of birth: 10 October 1989 (age 37)
- Place of birth: South Korea
- Height: 1.80 m (5 ft 11 in)
- Position: Defender

Team information
- Current team: Asan Mugunghwa
- Number: 32

Youth career
- 2005–2007: Haksung High School
- 2008–2011: Incheon University

Senior career*
| Years | Team | Apps | (Gls) |
| 2012 | Gyeongnam FC | 0 | (0) |
| 2013–2014 | Busan TC | 51 | (0) |
| 2015 | Goyang Zaicro FC | 26 | (1) |
| 2016– | Asan Mugunghwa (army) | 4 | (0) |
- * Club domestic league appearances and goals as of 1 November 2016

Ha In-ho (Korean: 하인호; born 10 October 1989) is a South Korean footballer who plays as defender for Asan Mugunghwa in K League Challenge.

== Career ==
Ha In-ho was selected by Gyeongnam FC in the 2012 K League draft. He didn't make any appearance in Gyeongnam and left the team after the 2012 season.

He joined Korea National League side Busan TC FC in 2013.

Ha signed with K League Challenge club Goyang Hi FC before the 2015 season starts. He made 26 appearances and a goal in 2015.
