= Heo Beom-san =

South Korean footballer

Heo Beom-San
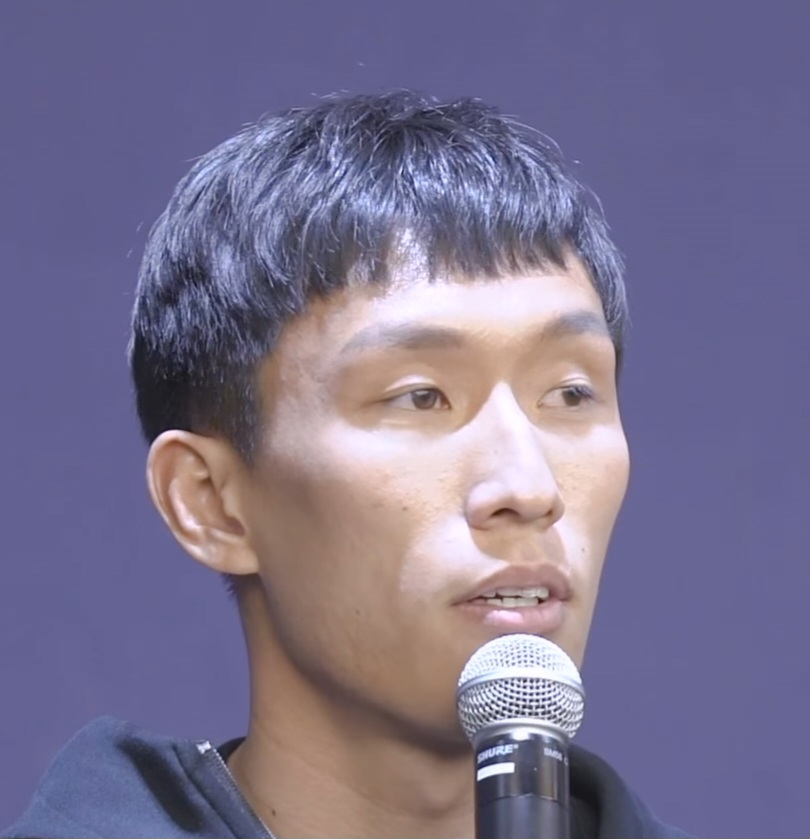

Personal information
- Full name: Heo Beom-San
- Date of birth: 14 September 1989 (age 37)
- Place of birth: Seoul, South Korea
- Height: 1.80 m (5 ft 11 in)
- Position: Midfielder

Team information
- Current team: Seoul E-Land
- Number: 8

Youth career
- Woosuk University

Senior career*
Years	Team	Apps	(Gls)
2012–2013	Daejeon Citizen	37	(1)
2014–2018	Jeju United	17	(0)
2016	→ Gangwon FC (loan)	35	(3)
2017	→ Busan IPark (loan)	13	(1)
2017–2018	→ Asan Mugunghwa (army)	12	(1)
2019–	Seoul E-Land	0	(0)
- * Club domestic league appearances and goals as of 3 January 2019

Heo Beom-San (Korean: 허범산; born 14 September 1989) is a South Korean footballer who plays as a midfielder for Seoul E-Land FC in the K League 2.

== Club career statistics ==
As of 30 May 2017

Club performance			League		Cup		Play-offs		International		Total	
Season	Club	League	Apps	Goals	Apps	Goals	Apps	Goals	Apps	Goals	Apps	Goals
South Korea			League		Cup		Play-offs		Asia		Total	
2012	Daejeon	K League 1	8	1	1	0	—	—	—	—	9	1
2013	Daejeon	K League 1	29	0	0	0	—	—	—	—	29	0
2014	Jeju	K League 1	1	0	0	0	—	—	—	—	1	0
2015	Jeju	K League 1	16	0	2	0	—	—	—	—	18	0
2016	Gangwon	K League 2	35	3	0	0	2	0	—	—	37	3
2017	Busan IPark	K League 2	13	1	1	0	0	0	—	—	14	1
Career total			102	5	4	0	2	0	0	0	108	5
