= Lee Kwang-hyun =

South Korean footballer (born 1981)

Lee Kwang-Hyun
Personal information
- Date of birth: 18 July 1981 (age 45)
- Place of birth: South Korea
- Height: 1.83 m (6 ft 0 in)
- Position: Defender

Team information
- Current team: Kuantan FA

Youth career
- 2000–2003: Korea University

Senior career*
Years	Team	Apps	(Gls)
2004–2011	Jeonbuk Hyundai	23	(0)
2007–2008	→ Gwangju Sangmu (army)	5	(0)
2012–2013	Daejeon Citizen	2	(0)
2013–2014	Penang	21	(2)
2015	Kuantan FA	20	(0)
- * Club domestic league appearances and goals as of September 10, 2014 ‡ National team caps and goals as of September 10, 2014

- Lee Kwang-hyun
- Hangul: 이광현
- Hanja: 李光鉉
- RR: I Gwanghyeon
- MR: I Kwanghyŏn

Lee Kwang-Hyun (born 18 July 1981) is a South Korean football player who currently plays with Penang FA in Malaysia Premier League.

== Career statistics ==
Club performance			League		Cup		League Cup		Continental		Total	
Season	Club	League	Apps	Goals	Apps	Goals	Apps	Goals	Apps	Goals	Apps	Goals
South Korea			League		KFA Cup		League Cup		Champions League		Total	
2004	Jeonbuk Hyundai	K-League	1	0	1	0	1	0	-		3	0
2005	Jeonbuk Hyundai	K-League	7	0	3	0	0	0	-		10	0
2006	Jeonbuk Hyundai	K-League	4	0	0	0	5	0	1	1	10	1
2007	Gwangju Sangmu	K-League	0	0	0	0	0	0	-		0	0
2008	Gwangju Sangmu	K-League	5	0	1	0	2	0	-		8	0
2009	Jeonbuk Hyundai	K-League	3	0	2	0	1	0	-		6	0
2010	Jeonbuk Hyundai	K-League	5	0	1	1	1	0	1	0	8	1
2011	Jeonbuk Hyundai	K-League	3	0	1	0	1	0	1	0	6	0
2012	Daejeon Citizen	K-League	2	0	0	0	0	0	-		2	0
Total	South Korea		30	0	9	1	11	0	3	1	53	2
Malaysia			League		FA Cup		Malaysia Cup		AFC Cup		Total	
2014	Penang	Premier League	21	2	1	0	3	0	-		25	2
2015	Kuantan	Premier League	20	0	0	0	0	0	-		20	0
Total	Malaysia		21	2	1	0	3	0	0	0	45	2
Career total			51	2	10	1	14	0	3	1	98	4
