= Ji Kyeong-deuk =

South Korean footballer

Ji Kyeong-Deuk
Personal information
- Full name: Ji Kyeong-Deuk
- Place of birth: South Korea
- Height: 1.74 m (5 ft 8 1/2 in)
- Position: Winger

Team information
- Current team: Dangjin Citizen FC

Senior career*
| Years | Team | Apps | (Gls) |
| 2011 | Incheon United | 2 | (0) |
| 2012–2013 | Daejeon Citizen | 49 | (2) |
| 2014 | → Chungju Hummel (loan) | 10 | (0) |
| 2018-2019 | Daejeon Korail FC | 27 | (1) |
| 2022- | Dangjin Citizen FC | 10 | (0) |
- * Club domestic league appearances and goals as of 21 October 2022

Ji Kyeong-Deuk (Korean: 지경득; born c. 1989) is a South Korean footballer who plays as a winger for Dangjin Citizen FC in the K3 League.
