= Kim Dong-hee (footballer) =

South Korean footballer (born 1989)

Personal information
- Date of birth: 6 May 1989 (age 37)
- Place of birth: South Korea
- Height: 1.69 m (5 ft 6 1/2 in)
- Position: Striker

Team information
- Current team: Pyeongtaek Citizen FC
- Number: 89

Youth career
- 2005–2007: Eonnam High School
- 2008–2010: Yonsei University

Senior career*
Years	Team	Apps	(Gls)
2011	Pohang Steelers	0	(0)
2012	Daejeon Citizen	9	(0)
2013	Giravanz Kitakyushu	31	(3)
2014–2018	Seongnam FC	88	(7)
2018	Sogdiana Jizzakh	9	(0)
2019	Daegu	5	(0)
2020–	Pyeongtaek Citizen FC	11	(2)
- * Club domestic league appearances and goals as of 1 December 2019

- Kim Dong-hee
- Hangul: 김동희
- Hanja: 金東熙
- RR: Gim Donghui
- MR: Kim Tonghŭi

Kim Dong-hee (Korean: 김동희; born 6 May 1989) is a South Korean footballer who plays for Pyeongtaek Citizen FC as a striker.

On 23 December 2016, Seongnam FC announced that Kim is going to stay another season for Seongnam.
