= Han Geuru =

South Korean footballer

Personal information
- Date of birth: 29 April 1988 (age 38)
- Place of birth: Namhae County, South Gyeongsang Province, South Korea
- Height: 1.92 m (6 ft 3 1/2 in)
- Position: Striker

Youth career
- 2008–2010: Dankook University

Senior career*
Years	Team	Apps	(Gls)
2011	Seongnam	4	(0)
2012–2013	Daejeon Citizen	14	(0)
- * Club domestic league appearances and goals as of 16 December 2013

- Han Geuru
- Hangul: 한그루
- RR: Han Geuru
- MR: Han Kŭru

Han Geuru (born 29 April 1988) is a South Korean football player who plays as a striker for Daejeon Citizen in the K League. He is also known as Han Geu-loo or Han Geu-roo.
