= Hwang Do-yeon =

South Korean footballer

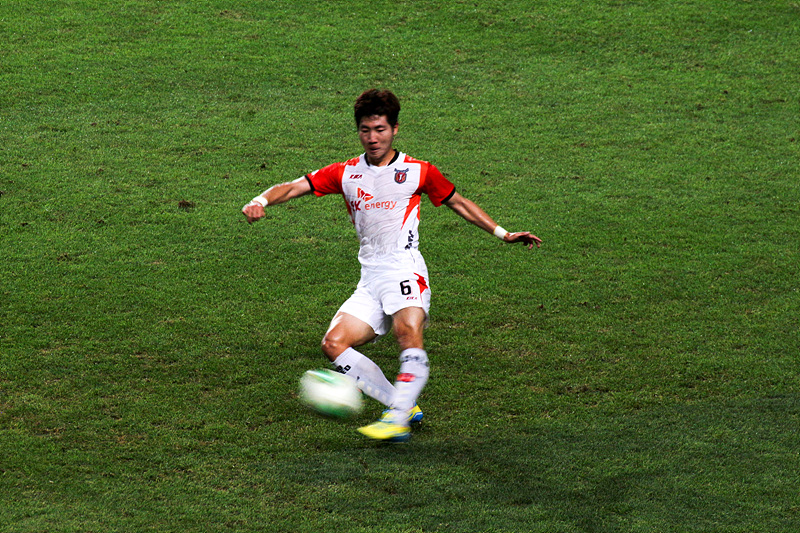
- Hwang Do-yeon in PSBS Biak, 2024

Personal information
- Full name: Hwang Do-yeon
- Date of birth: 27 February 1991 (age 35)
- Place of birth: Goheung, South Korea
- Height: 1.86 m (6 ft 1 in)
- Position: Centre-back

Youth career
- 2007–2009: Gwangyang Jecheol High School

Senior career*
Years	Team	Apps	(Gls)
2010–2013	Chunnam Dragons	18	(1)
2012	→ Daejeon Hana Citizen (loan)	10	(0)
2013–2018	Jeju United	30	(1)
2015	→ Seoul E-Land (loan)	34	(1)
2016–2017	→ Asan Mugunghwa (loan)	21	(1)
2018	Suwon FC	16	(0)
2019–2020	Daejeon Hana Citizen	14	(0)
2021–2022	Sukhothai	28	(0)
2022–2023	Gimpo	6	(0)
2023–2024	PSBS Biak	3	(0)

International career
2007	South Korea U17	1	(0)
2009-2011	South Korea U20	12	(2)
2011–2013	South Korea U23	13	(2)
- * Club domestic league appearances and goals as of 12 January 2024

- Hwang Do-yeon
- Hangul: 황도연
- Hanja: 黃渡然
- RR: Hwang Doyeon
- MR: Hwang Toyŏn

Hwang Do-yeon (Korean: 황도연; born 27 February 1991) is a South Korean professional footballer who plays as a centre-back.

== Club career ==
=== PSBS Biak ===
In December 2023, he officially signed a contract with PSBS Biak club in the second round of the Liga 2 season 2023–24.

== Honours ==
PSBS Biak

- Liga 2: 2023–24
