= Kim Jae-hoon =

South Korean footballer (born 1988)

Personal information
- Date of birth: 21 February 1988 (age 38)
- Place of birth: South Korea
- Height: 1.78 m (5 ft 10 in)
- Position: Defender

Team information
- Current team: Gangneung FC
- Number: 26

Youth career
- 2003–2005: Pohang Jecheol Technical High School
- 2007–2010: Konkuk University

Senior career*
Years	Team	Apps	(Gls)
2011	Chunnam Dragons	0	(0)
2012	Daejeon Citizen	7	(0)
2013	Gangneung City	25	(0)
2014–2015	Chungju Hummel	19	(1)
2015	Gyeongju KHNP	7	(0)
2016-2018	Chuncheon FC		
- * Club domestic league appearances and goals as of 28 November 2014

- Kim Jae-hoon
- Hangul: 김재훈
- Hanja: 金載薰
- RR: Gim Jaehun
- MR: Kim Chaehun

Kim Jae-hoon (Korean: 김재훈; born 21 February 1988) is a South Korean footballer who plays as a defender for Chungju Hummel in the K League Challenge.
