= Ha Po-gyong =

- Occupation: Traditional Korean dancer
- Career
- Dances: Dance of the Commoner, Dance of the Artistocrat, Drum Dance

Ha Po-gyong (Korean: 하보경; born 1906 - died 1996) was a Korean dancer who was designated an Important Intangible Cultural Asset. He was the sole master of the beombuchum (the Dance of the Commoner) and a recognised master of the obukchum or Five Drums Dance.

Ha's primary focus was on the improvisational dance form known as heoteunchum. Because of their unstructured nature, Ha was able to continue performing these dances well into his eighties, abbreviating or adapting them according to his physical ability.

== Life ==
Ha was born in Miryang province, the home of the Miryang Baekjung Festival, to parents who were folk dancers and musicians. He specialised in the drum from his mid-teens, and developed a reputation in the area for his skill in the drum dance. At 19, he became an official member of his family's dance troupe, and performed with them at local events and wrestling matches.

In his early twenties, Ha absconded from Miryang to Manchuria, using the proceeds from the sale of an ox he had been asked to sell on his father's behalf. On returning to Korea, his economic situation obliged him to work as a manual labourer in Chagang. Ha's father died shortly thereafter. Ha continued to lead a vagrant lifestyle for much of his life, until finally, in his sixties, he returned to Miryang. Here, he founded a traditional music association, which eventually developed into the Folklore Preservation Society. He also performed in the annual Miryang Baekjung festival, which brought him national recognition after it was designated an Important Intangible Cultural Property. Ha received the Prime Minister's Award in the 1980s National Folk Arts Contest, and was subsequently recognised as an Important Intangible Cultural Asset in his own right.
