= Kim Hyeung-bum =

South Korean footballer (born 1984)

Kim Hyeung-Bum 김형범

Personal information
- Full name: Kim Hyeung-Bum
- Date of birth: January 1, 1984 (age 42)
- Place of birth: Seoul, South Korea
- Height: 1.74 m (5 ft 9 in)
- Position: Midfielder

Youth career
- 2002–2003: Konkuk University

Senior career*
Years	Team	Apps	(Gls)
2004–2005	Ulsan Hyundai Horang-i	27	(3)
2006–2012	Jeonbuk Hyundai Motors	63	(14)
2012	Daejeon Citizen (loan)	32	(5)
2013	Gyeongnam FC	21	(8)
2014	Buriram United	0	(0)

International career^{‡}
2003	South Korea U-20	2	(0)
2008–2013	South Korea	5	(0)
- * Club domestic league appearances and goals as of 14 December 2013 ‡ National team caps and goals as of 15 November 2008

Kim Hyeung-Bum (Korean: 김형범, born January 1, 1984) is a retired South Korean footballer. He is best known for his free-kick ability.

He scored a record 11 free-kick goals in the K League Classic.

== International career ==
Kim made his international debut in a World Cup qualification against UAE on October 15, 2008. He assisted South Korea's fourth goal of the game. The game ended 4-1 for South Korea.

== Club career statistics ==
Club performance			League		Cup		League Cup		Continental		Total	
Season	Club	League	Apps	Goals	Apps	Goals	Apps	Goals	Apps	Goals	Apps	Goals
South Korea			League		KFA Cup		League Cup		Asia		Total	
2004	Ulsan Hyundai Horang-i	K-League	17	0	4	0	12	1	-		33	1
2005	Ulsan Hyundai Horang-i	K-League	10	3	0	0	4	1	-		14	4
2006	Jeonbuk Hyundai Motors	K-League	23	5	2	0	5	2	8	5	38	12
2007	Jeonbuk Hyundai Motors	K-League	6	2	0	0	0	0	2	0	8	2
2008	Jeonbuk Hyundai Motors	K-League	25	6	3	1	6	1	-		34	8
2009	Jeonbuk Hyundai Motors	K-League	1	0	0	0	0	0	-		1	0
2010	Jeonbuk Hyundai Motors	K-League	6	1	2	0	3	0	0	0	11	1
2011	Jeonbuk Hyundai Motors	K-League	3	0	2	0	1	0	2	0	8	0
2012	Daejeon Citizen	K-League							-			
Total	South Korea		91	17	13	1	31	5	12	5	147	28
Career total			91	17	13	1	31	5	12	5	147	28

== Honours ==
Ulsan Hyundai FC

- K League 1 (1) : 2005

Jeonbuk Hyundai Motors

- K League 1 (2) : 2009, 2011
- AFC Champions League (1) : 2006
