= Alessandro Lopes =

Brazilian footballer (born 1984)

Personal information
- Full name: Alessandro Lopes Pereira
- Date of birth: 13 February 1984 (age 42)
- Place of birth: Ponta Grossa, Brazil
- Height: 1.86 m (6 ft 1 in)
- Position: Defender

Team information
- Current team: Chungju Hummel
- Number: 25

Senior career*
Years	Team	Apps	(Gls)
2002–2005	Atlético Paranaense		
2005	Grêmio		
2006	Portuguesa Santista		
2006	Atlético Paranaense		
2007	Avaí		
2008	Mesquita		
2008	Toledo		
2009	Joinville		
2009	Ipatinga		
2010	Paraná		
2011	ABC		
2012	Nacional (MG)		
2012	Daejeon Citizen	21	(0)
2013	Chungju Hummel	11	(0)
- * Club domestic league appearances and goals as of 19 December 2013

Alessandro Lopes Pereira, as known as Alessandro Lopes (born 13 February 1984) is a Brazilian footballer who plays as a defender. He played for Chungju Hummel in K League Challenge.
