= Kevin Oris =

Belgian footballer (born 1984)

Personal information
- Full name: Kevin Julienne Henricus Oris
- Date of birth: 6 December 1984 (age 41)
- Place of birth: Turnhout, Belgium
- Height: 1.92 m (6 ft 3 1/2 in)
- Position: Forward

Team information
- Current team: Wezel Sport

Senior career*
Years	Team	Apps	(Gls)
2002–2003	AC Olen	22	(8)
2003–2004	Lyra	22	(7)
2004–2005	FCN Sint-Niklaas	12	(1)
2005–2006	FCV Meerhout	36	(42)
2006–2007	SV Roeselare	16	(2)
2007–2008	KVSK United	26	(9)
2008–2009	Mons	24	(2)
2009–2012	Antwerp	77	(38)
2012	Daejeon Citizen	37	(16)
2013	Jeonbuk Hyundai Motors	31	(14)
2014	Liaoning Whowin	9	(1)
2015–2016	Incheon United	68	(15)
2017	Kyoto Sanga	27	(6)
2018–2019	Thes Sport		
2019–2021	KVV Berg en Dal		
2021–	Wezel Sport		
- * Club domestic league appearances and goals as of 3 November 2016

Kevin Oris (born 6 December 1984 in Turnhout) is a Belgian football player who plays for Wezel Sport. He is a tall attacker, which makes him an ideal target man.

== Career ==
Oris always played with third and fourth division teams until he scored 35 goals in 27 matches with FCV Meerhout. This earned him a transfer to Jupiler League side SV Roeselare. Due to a lack of chances, Oris went to KVSK United in second division, which was again a successful period. He returned to the highest level of Belgian football in 2008 and signed for RAEC Mons. Mons were relegated in the 2008-09 season. On 18 January 2012, it was announced that Oris signed a contract with South Korean side Daejeon Citizen. He became the first Belgian player to ever play in the K League 1. He scored 16 goals in 37 games (5th in the league). In the 2013 season, he joined Jeonbuk Hyundai Motors and had another successful season, scoring 14 goals in 31 matches. In January 2014, Oris transferred to Chinese Super League side Liaoning Whowin but he left early as the team failed to provide wages.

On 16 February 2015, Oris transferred to fellow K League 1 side Incheon United.
