= 2012 K-League =

Hyundai Oilbank K League
- Season: 2012
- Dates: 3 March – 2 December 2012
- Champions: FC Seoul (5th title)
- Relegated: Gwangju FC; Sangju Sangmu Phoenix
- Champions League: FC Seoul; Pohang Steelers; Jeonbuk Hyundai Motors; Suwon Samsung Bluewings
- Matches: 338
- Goals: 886 (2.62 per match)
- Best Player: Dejan Damjanović
- Top goalscorer: Dejan Damjanović (27 goals)
- Biggest home win: Gwangju 6–0 Jeonnam (23 June 2012); Jeju 6–0 Jeonnam (21 July 2012); Seoul 6–0 Busan (21 July 2012)
- Biggest away win: Daegu 1–5 Jeonbuk (17 June 2012)
- Highest scoring: Jeonbuk 5–3 Gyeongnam (24 June 2012)
- Longest winning run: 8 matches Jeonbuk Hyundai Motors (11 May – 1 July 2012)
- Longest unbeaten run: 15 matches Jeonbuk Hyundai Motors (27 April – 28 July 2012)
- Longest winless run: 12 matches Incheon United (1 April – 17 June 2012); Gwangju FC (1 April – 17 June 2012)
- Longest losing run: 14 matches Sangju Sangmu (26 August – 1 December 2012)
- Highest attendance: 50,787; Seoul 0–2 Suwon (18 August 2012)
- Lowest attendance: 82; Incheon 1–1 Pohang (14 June 2012)
- Average attendance: 7,045

The 2012 K League, officially known as Hyundai Oilbank K-League 2012, was the 30th season of the K League. It was sponsored by Hyundai Oilbank. Since this season, the K League Championship and the Korean League Cup were abolished, and K League introduced the "split system", inspired by Scottish Premier League. After all 16 clubs played 30 matches each under the home and away system, they were split into the group of top eight and the group of bottom eight, playing with each other in a group again.

== Teams ==
Locations of the 2012 K League clubs

=== General information ===
Club	City	Stadium	2011 season
Busan IPark	Busan	Busan Asiad Stadium	6th place
Jeonnam Dragons	Gwangyang	Gwangyang Football Stadium	7th place
Daegu FC	Daegu	Daegu Stadium	12th place
Daejeon Citizen	Daejeon	Daejeon World Cup Stadium	15th place
Gangwon FC	Gangneung; Chuncheon	Gangneung Stadium; Chuncheon Stadium	16th place
Gwangju FC	Gwangju	Gwangju World Cup Stadium	11th place
Gyeongnam FC	Changwon	Changwon Football Center	8th place
Incheon United	Incheon	Incheon Football Stadium	13th place
Jeju United	Seogwipo	Jeju World Cup Stadium	9th place
Jeonbuk Hyundai Motors	Jeonju	Jeonju World Cup Stadium	Champions
Pohang Steelers	Pohang	Pohang Steel Yard	3rd place
Sangju Sangmu Phoenix	Sangju	Sangju Civic Stadium	14th place
Seongnam Ilhwa Chunma	Seongnam	Tancheon Sports Complex	10th place
FC Seoul	Seoul	Seoul World Cup Stadium	5th place
Suwon Samsung Bluewings	Suwon	Suwon World Cup Stadium	4th place
Ulsan Hyundai	Ulsan	Ulsan Munsu Football Stadium	Runners-up

=== Personnel and kits ===
Team	Manager	Kit supplier	Sponsor
Busan IPark	(South Korea) An Ik-soo	Puma	Busan Bank
Jeonnam Dragons	(South Korea) Ha Seok-ju	Kelme	POSCO
Daegu FC	(Brazil) Moacir Pereira	Hummel	Daegu Bank
Daejeon Citizen	(South Korea) Yoo Sang-chul	Lotto	Daejeon
Gangwon FC	(South Korea) Kim Hak-bum	Mizuno	High 1 Resort
Gwangju FC	(South Korea) Choi Man-hee	Joma	Gwangju Bank
Gyeongnam FC	(South Korea) Choi Jin-han	Hummel	STX
Incheon United	(South Korea) Kim Bong-gil	Le Coq Sportif	Shinhan Bank
Jeju United	(South Korea) Park Kyung-hoon	Astore	SK Energy
Jeonbuk Hyundai Motors	(South Korea) Lee Heung-sil	Hummel	Hyundai i40, Hyundai Santa Fe
Pohang Steelers	(South Korea) Hwang Sun-hong	Kappa	POSCO
Sangju Sangmu Phoenix	(South Korea) Park Hang-seo	Jako	Sangju
Seongnam Ilhwa Chunma	(South Korea) Shin Tae-yong	Uhlsport	McCOL
FC Seoul	(South Korea) Choi Yong-soo	Le Coq Sportif	Xii
Suwon Samsung Bluewings	(South Korea) Yoon Sung-hyo	Adidas	Samsung Smart TV
Ulsan Hyundai	(South Korea) Kim Ho-kon	Diadora	Hyundai Oilbank

=== Managerial changes ===
Team	Outgoing	Manner	Date	Incoming	Date	Table
Daegu FC	(South Korea) Lee Young-jin	Sacked	31 October 2011	(Brazil) Moacir Pereira	2 November 2011	Pre-season
Jeonbuk Hyundai Motors	(South Korea) Choi Kang-hee	Signed for South Korea	21 December 2011	(South Korea) Lee Heung-sil	21 December 2011	Pre-season
Sangju Sangmu Phoenix	(South Korea) Kim Tae-wan	Caretaker	29 December 2011	(South Korea) Park Hang-seo	29 December 2011	Pre-season
Incheon United	(South Korea) Huh Jung-moo	Resigned	11 April 2012	(South Korea) Kim Bong-gil	13 April 2012	15th
Gangwon FC	(South Korea) Kim Sang-ho	Resigned	1 July 2012	(South Korea) Kim Hak-bum	6 July 2012	14th
Jeonnam Dragons	(South Korea) Jung Hae-seong	Resigned	10 August 2012	(South Korea) Ha Seok-ju	14 August 2012	16th

=== Foreign players ===
Restricting the number of foreign players strictly to four per team, including a slot for a player from AFC countries. A team could use four foreign players on the field each game including a least one player from the AFC country.

Club	Player 1	Player 2	Player 3	AFC player	Former player(s)
Busan IPark	(Brazil) Éder Baiano	(Brazil) Fágner	(Brazil) José Mota	(Australia) Matt McKay	
Jeonnam Dragons	(Australia) Matt Simon	(Brazil) Henan	(Brazil) Lúcio Flávio	(Australia) Robert Cornthwaite	(Brazil) Leléco
Daegu FC	(Brazil) Dinélson	(Brazil) Leandrinho	(Brazil) Matheus		
Daejeon Citizen	(Belgium) Kevin Oris	(Brazil) Alessandro Lopes	(Brazil) Alex Terra	(Japan) Yuta Baba	(Brazil) Leozinho
Gangwon FC	(Bosnia and Herzegovina) Muhamed Džakmić	(Brazil) Weslley	(Romania) Ianis Zicu	(Japan) Yusuke Shimada	(Russia) Denis Laktionov
Gwangju FC	(Brazil) João Paulo	(Montenegro) Bogdan Milić			(Brazil) Adriano Chuva
Gyeongnam FC	(Brazil) Caíque	(Brazil) Roni	(Colombia) Wilmar Jordán	(Australia) Luke DeVere	
Incheon United	(Albania) Sokol Cikalleshi	(Brazil) Ivo	(Brazil) Paulo Júnior	(Australia) Nathan Burns	(Brazil) Ferdinando
Jeju United	(Brazil) Júnior Santos	(Brazil) Jair	(Brazil) Renan Marques	(Australia) Adrian Madaschi	(Brazil) Robert
Jeonbuk Hyundai Motors	(Brazil) Eninho	(Brazil) Leonardo	(Chile) Hugo Droguett	(Australia) Alex Wilkinson	(Brazil) Luiz Henrique (China) Huang Bowen
Pohang Steelers	(Ghana) Derek Asamoah	(Serbia) Zoran Rendulić			(Romania) Ianis Zicu
Seongnam Ilhwa Chunma	(Brazil) Éverton Santos	(Brazil) Jael Ferreira	(Colombia) Javier Reina	(Australia) Brendan Hamill	(Brazil) Héverton (Serbia) Vladimir Jovančić (Australia) Sasa Ognenovski
FC Seoul	(Brazil) Adilson	(Colombia) Mauricio Molina	(Montenegro) Dejan Damjanović	(Japan) Sergio Escudero	
Suwon Samsung Bluewings	(Brazil) Éverton Cardoso	(North Macedonia) Stevica Ristić	(Montenegro) Dženan Radončić	(Australia) Eddy Bosnar	
Ulsan Hyundai	(Brazil) Maranhão	(Brazil) Rafinha	(Colombia) Julián Estiven Vélez		(Japan) Akihiro Ienaga

== League table ==
Pos	Team	Pld	W	D	L	GF	GA	GD	Pts	Qualification or relegation
1	FC Seoul (C)	44	29	9	6	76	42	+34	96	Qualification for the Champions League (Note: Pohang Steelers finished the league in third place after qualifying for the Champions League as winners of the FA Cup: therefore, the spot given to the third-placed team was passed to the Suwon Samsung Bluewings, the fourth-placed team.)
2	Jeonbuk Hyundai Motors	44	22	13	9	82	49	+33	79	Qualification for the Champions League
3	Pohang Steelers	44	23	8	13	72	47	+25	77	Qualification for the Champions League
4	Suwon Samsung Bluewings	44	20	13	11	61	51	+10	73	Qualification for the Champions League
5	Ulsan Hyundai	44	18	14	12	60	52	+8	68	
6	Jeju United	44	16	15	13	71	56	+15	63	
7	Busan IPark	44	13	14	17	40	51	−11	53	
8	Gyeongnam FC	44	14	8	22	50	60	−10	50	
9	Incheon United	44	17	16	11	46	40	+6	67	
10	Daegu FC	44	16	13	15	55	56	−1	61	
11	Jeonnam Dragons	44	13	14	17	47	60	−13	53	
12	Seongnam Ilhwa Chunma	44	14	10	20	47	56	−9	52	
13	Daejeon Citizen	44	13	11	20	46	67	−21	50	
14	Gangwon FC	44	14	7	23	57	68	−11	49	
15	Gwangju FC (R)	44	10	15	19	57	67	−10	45	Relegation to the K League Challenge
16	Sangju Sangmu Phoenix (R)	44	7	6	31	29	74	−45	27	Withdrawal (Note: Sangju Sangmu Phoenix were going to be forcibly relegated to the second division by K League Federation regardless of the results after they failed to get a club license from the Asian Football Confederation. They withdrew after the 31st matchweek once their relegation was confirmed.)

Source: K League
Rules for classification: 1) Points; 2) Goal difference; 3) Goals scored.
(C) Champions; (R) Relegated

== Positions by matchday ==
Leaders
Qualification for the Champions League
Relegation to the K League Challenge

=== Round 1–30 ===
Team ╲ Round	1	2	3	4	5	6	7	8	9	10	11	12	13	14	15	16	17	18	19	20	21	22	23	24	25	26	27	28	29	30
FC Seoul	7	5	3	1	5	3	3	3	4	4	4	3	2	1	1	1	3	3	3	2	2	2	2	2	2	2	1	2	1	1
Jeonbuk Hyundai Motors	3	2	4	6	8	7	5	5	5	5	6	6	4	4	3	2	1	1	1	1	1	1	1	1	1	1	2	1	2	2
Suwon Samsung Bluewings	4	1	1	3	1	2	1	1	1	1	2	1	1	2	2	3	2	2	2	3	3	4	4	3	4	4	4	3	3	3
Ulsan Hyundai	4	3	2	4	4	3	3	3	3	3	1	4	5	5	5	5	5	5	4	4	4	3	3	4	3	3	3	4	4	4
Pohang Steelers	12	10	11	8	7	5	7	7	6	8	8	9	7	9	9	7	7	8	8	8	7	6	7	7	7	7	7	6	5	5
Busan IPark	12	10	11	15	10	9	9	9	7	6	5	5	6	6	6	6	6	6	6	6	6	7	6	6	6	6	5	5	6	6
Jeju United	2	4	6	5	3	1	2	2	2	2	3	2	3	3	4	4	4	4	5	5	5	5	5	5	5	5	6	7	7	7
Gyeongnam FC	1	8	10	13	13	13	11	14	13	14	14	14	13	11	11	11	11	9	9	9	9	9	9	9	8	9	9	10	10	8
Incheon United	15	15	15	14	15	14	15	15	15	15	15	15	15	16	16	16	16	14	15	14	12	12	11	11	11	10	10	8	8	9
Daegu FC	7	13	8	7	6	8	8	10	10	7	7	8	8	7	7	8	8	7	7	7	8	8	8	8	9	8	8	9	9	10
Seongnam Ilhwa Chunma	11	9	14	12	14	15	12	11	9	10	10	7	10	10	8	10	9	10	10	10	10	10	10	10	10	11	11	11	11	11
Jeonnam Dragons	9	14	13	9	11	11	13	13	12	11	11	10	9	8	10	9	10	11	11	11	11	11	13	14	15	15	16	15	15	12
Daejeon Citizen	16	16	16	16	16	16	16	16	16	16	16	16	16	15	14	15	13	13	13	15	16	16	16	16	14	16	15	13	12	13
Gwangju FC	4	7	4	2	2	6	6	6	8	9	9	11	11	13	12	12	12	12	12	13	14	14	14	15	16	14	12	12	13	14
Sangju Sangmu Phoenix	12	10	7	10	9	12	14	12	13	13	12	12	12	14	15	13	14	15	16	16	15	15	15	13	12	12	13	14	14	15
Gangwon FC	9	6	8	11	12	10	10	8	11	12	13	13	14	12	13	14	15	16	14	12	13	13	12	12	13	13	14	16	16	16

Source: K League

=== Round 31–44 ===
Team ╲ Round	31	32	33	34	35	36	37	38	39	40	41	42	43	44
FC Seoul	1	1	1	1	1	1	1	1	1	1	1	1	1	1
Jeonbuk Hyundai Motors	2	2	2	2	2	2	2	2	2	2	2	2	2	2
Pohang Steelers	5	5	5	5	4	4	4	4	4	3	3	4	3	3
Suwon Samsung Bluewings	4	4	4	3	3	3	3	3	3	4	4	3	4	4
Ulsan Hyundai	3	3	3	4	5	5	5	5	5	5	5	5	5	5
Jeju United	7	7	7	7	6	7	6	6	6	6	6	6	6	6
Busan IPark	6	6	6	6	7	6	7	7	7	7	7	7	7	7
Gyeongnam FC	8	8	8	8	8	8	8	8	8	8	8	8	8	8
Incheon United	9	9	9	9	9	9	9	9	9	9	9	9	9	9
Daegu FC	10	10	10	10	10	11	10	10	10	10	10	10	10	10
Jeonnam Dragons	13	12	13	13	13	13	13	13	13	12	12	11	11	11
Seongnam Ilhwa Chunma	11	11	11	11	11	10	11	11	11	11	11	12	12	12
Daejeon Citizen	12	13	12	12	12	12	12	12	12	13	13	13	13	13
Gangwon FC	16	16	15	15	15	15	14	14	14	15	15	14	14	14
Gwangju FC	14	14	14	14	14	14	15	15	15	14	14	15	15	15
Sangju Sangmu Phoenix	15	15	16	16	16	16	16	16	16	16	16	16	16	16

Source: K League

== Results ==
=== Matches 1–30 ===
Home \ Away	BIP	JND	DGU	DJC	GWN	GWJ	GNM	ICU	JJU	JHM	PHS	SSP	SIC	SEO	SSB	USH
Busan IPark	—	0–0	2–0	3–1	1–0	1–2	1–0	1–2	1–1	0–0	0–0	0–0	1–0	0–0	0–0	1–0
Jeonnam Dragons	2–3	—	0–3	3–1	0–0	2–2	3–1	0–0	1–0	2–3	3–4	0–0	0–1	0–3	1–1	0–1
Daegu FC	2–1	1–0	—	1–1	2–0	1–1	2–3	1–0	2–0	1–5	1–0	2–1	1–2	1–1	0–0	1–0
Daejeon Citizen	0–1	0–1	2–2	—	0–3	2–1	1–1	0–2	0–3	0–1	0–1	2–2	0–1	0–2	2–1	0–0
Gangwon FC	1–2	3–4	2–0	0–2	—	0–0	0–3	2–1	1–1	0–1	1–2	0–3	1–2	1–2	1–4	1–2
Gwangju FC	0–2	6–0	2–2	1–2	1–1	—	0–1	0–0	3–2	0–3	1–1	1–0	1–2	1–2	2–2	0–1
Gyeongnam FC	2–0	0–1	4–1	3–0	0–2	2–1	—	0–0	3–1	0–2	0–1	2–3	2–0	0–1	0–0	3–2
Incheon United	0–0	1–0	1–0	2–1	2–0	1–1	0–0	—	0–0	3–3	1–1	1–0	0–0	3–2	0–2	0–1
Jeju United	5–2	6–0	2–0	4–1	4–2	0–2	3–1	3–1	—	1–3	0–1	2–1	1–2	3–3	2–1	0–0
Jeonbuk Hyundai Motors	0–0	1–1	2–3	0–1	2–1	5–2	5–3	1–2	3–3	—	2–0	2–0	3–2	0–0	3–0	2–1
Pohang Steelers	2–2	1–0	4–2	0–0	1–2	1–0	0–1	2–1	2–3	1–0	—	0–1	3–1	1–0	5–0	0–1
Sangju Sangmu Phoenix	1–2	1–2	1–1	1–2	2–1	0–1	1–0	1–0	2–1	0–3	1–2	—	0–3	0–1	0–3	3–4
Seongnam Ilhwa Chunma	0–1	1–1	0–0	0–3	1–2	4–2	2–0	1–0	1–1	0–0	0–2	1–1	—	2–3	1–1	0–1
FC Seoul	6–0	2–0	2–0	2–0	3–2	3–2	2–1	3–1	1–1	2–1	2–1	2–0	1–0	—	0–2	1–1
Suwon Samsung Bluewings	1–0	3–2	1–0	2–2	3–0	4–1	0–3	3–1	1–1	0–3	2–0	3–1	2–1	2–0	—	2–1
Ulsan Hyundai	2–1	1–0	1–1	2–0	1–2	2–1	2–1	0–1	2–2	1–1	3–1	2–2	3–0	2–2	3–2	—

Source: K League
Legend: Blue = home team win; Yellow = draw; Red = away team win.

=== Matches 31–44 ===
==== Top eight ====
Home \ Away	BIP	GNM	JJU	JHM	PHS	SEO	SSB	USH
Busan IPark	—	0–0	1–2	2–2	1–1	0–2	0–1	0–1
Gyeongnam FC	1–0	—	0–0	2–1	0–4	0–3	0–0	1–2
Jeju United	2–1	2–0	—	0–1	2–1	1–2	2–1	2–2
Jeonbuk Hyundai Motors	3–0	2–1	0–0	—	0–3	1–1	3–1	3–3
Pohang Steelers	0–2	3–3	1–1	3–2	—	5–0	3–0	3–1
FC Seoul	2–1	1–0	1–0	1–0	3–2	—	1–1	3–1
Suwon Samsung Bluewings	2–1	2–1	2–1	1–1	1–2	1–0	—	0–0
Ulsan Hyundai	2–2	3–1	0–0	1–3	0–1	1–2	0–0	—

Source: K League
Legend: Blue = home team win; Yellow = draw; Red = away team win.

==== Bottom eight ====
Home \ Away	JND	DGU	DJC	GWN	GWJ	ICU	SSP (Note: According to the withdrawal of Sangju Sangmu Phoenix, K League Federation awarded 2–0 wins to the other teams for the related matches.)	SIC
Jeonnam Dragons	—	2–2	3–1	0–0	1–1	0–0	2–0	2–0
Daegu FC	0–1	—	4–1	2–2	2–0	2–2	2–0	1–0
Daejeon Citizen	1–0	1–0	—	5–3	1–1	1–1	2–0	1–1
Gangwon FC	2–3	3–0	5–1	—	1–0	2–1	2–0	0–1
Gwangju FC	1–0	1–1	1–1	1–1	—	1–1	2–0	2–3
Incheon United	0–0	2–1	1–0	2–1	3–2	—	2–0	0–0
Sangju Sangmu Phoenix	0–2	0–2	0–2	0–2	0–2	0–2	—	0–2
Seongnam Ilhwa Chunma	2–2	0–2	1–2	0–1	3–4	1–2	2–0	—

Source: K League
Legend: Blue = home team win; Yellow = draw; Red = away team win.

== Player statistics ==
=== Top scorers ===
Rank	Player	Club	Goals
1	(Montenegro) Dejan Damjanović	FC Seoul	31
2	(South Korea) Lee Dong-gook	Jeonbuk Hyundai Motors	26
3	(Brazil) Jair	Jeju United	18
3	(Colombia) Mauricio Molina	FC Seoul	18
5	(Belgium) Kevin Oris	Daejeon Citizen	16
5	(South Korea) Kim Eun-jung	Gangwon FC	16
6	(Romania) Ianis Zicu	Gangwon FC	15
6	(Brazil) Eninho	Jeonbuk Hyundai Motors	15
8	(Brazil) Júnior Santos	Jeju United	14
9	(Brazil) Maranhão	Ulsan Hyundai	13
9	(South Korea) Kim Shin-wook	Ulsan Hyundai	13

=== Top assist providers ===
Rank	Player	Club	Assists
1	(Colombia) Mauricio Molina	FC Seoul	19
2	(Brazil) Eninho	Jeonbuk Hyundai Motors	13
3	(South Korea) Lee Seung-gi	Gwangju FC	12
4	(Brazil) Júnior Santos	Jeju United	11
5	(South Korea) Kim Hyeung-bum	Daejeon Citizen	10
6	(Chile) Hugo Droguett	Jeonbuk Hyundai Motors	9
6	(Brazil) Jair	Jeju United	9
8	(South Korea) Hwang Jin-sung	Pohang Steelers	8
8	(South Korea) Park Sung-ho	Pohang Steelers	8
8	(South Korea) Go Seul-ki	Ulsan Hyundai	8
8	(South Korea) Hwang Il-su	Daegu FC	8

== Awards ==
=== Main awards ===
Award	Winner	Club
Most Valuable Player	(Montenegro) Dejan Damjanović	FC Seoul
Top goalscorer	(Montenegro) Dejan Damjanović	FC Seoul
Top assist provider	(Colombia) Mauricio Molina	FC Seoul
Rookie of the Year	(South Korea) Lee Myung-joo	Pohang Steelers
FANtastic Player	(Montenegro) Dejan Damjanović	FC Seoul
Manager of the Year	(South Korea) Choi Yong-soo	FC Seoul
Special Award	(South Korea) Kim Yong-dae	FC Seoul
Special Award	(South Korea) Kim Byung-ji	Gyeongnam FC
Best Referee	(South Korea) Choi Myung-yong	—
Best Assistant Referee	(South Korea) Kim Yong-soo	—
Team of the Year	FC Seoul	
Fair Play Award	Ulsan Hyundai	
Youth Team of the Year	Pungsaeng Middle School (Seongnam Ilhwa Chunma)	

=== Best XI ===
Position	Winner	Club
Goalkeeper	(South Korea) Kim Yong-dae	FC Seoul
Defenders	(Brazil) Adilson	FC Seoul
Defenders	(South Korea) Jung In-whan	Incheon United
Defenders	(South Korea) Kwak Tae-hwi	Ulsan Hyundai
Defenders	(South Korea) Kim Chang-soo	Busan IPark
Midfielders	(Colombia) Mauricio Molina	FC Seoul
Midfielders	(South Korea) Ha Dae-sung	FC Seoul
Midfielders	(South Korea) Hwang Jin-sung	Pohang Steelers
Midfielders	(South Korea) Lee Keun-ho	Ulsan Hyundai
Forwards	(South Korea) Lee Dong-gook	Jeonbuk Hyundai Motors
Forwards	(Montenegro) Dejan Damjanović	FC Seoul

== Attendance ==
Due to the match-fixing scandal that involved 40 current and former players in the previous year, there was a massive decline in attendance the following season. The scandal continued to have an effect on the league's attendance for several seasons thereafter.

=== Attendance by club ===
Pos	Team	Total	High	Low	Average	Change
1	FC Seoul	451,045	50,787	7,278	20,502	−26.2%
2	Suwon Samsung Bluewings	445,820	45,192	9,227	20,265	−16.3%
3	Jeonbuk Hyundai Motors	225,261	20,765	4,051	10,239	−32.1%
4	Pohang Steelers	193,682	16,866	4,076	8,804	−35.6%
5	Ulsan Hyundai	163,921	25,395	1,107	7,451	−51.2%
6	Daegu FC	150,269	21,750	536	7,156	+10.5%
7	Jeju United	143,699	16,910	978	6,532	+41.7%
8	Daejeon Citizen	93,231	10,160	1,842	4,440	−68.8%
9	Busan IPark	88,344	9,537	929	4,016	−44.5%
10	Incheon United	81,779	17,662	82	3,894	−48.5%
11	Gangwon FC	64,623	6,932	1,241	3,077	−47.4%
12	Jeonnam Dragons	63,718	7,040	1,490	3,034	−47.7%
13	Seongnam Ilhwa Chunma	61,278	6,725	588	2,918	−57.4%
14	Gwangju FC	60,383	10,711	713	2,875	−67.3%
15	Sangju Sangmu Phoenix	42,300	5,710	1,063	2,820	−66.6%
16	Gyeongnam FC	51,784	5,745	884	2,354	−74.0%
	League total	2,168,606	50,787	82	7,045	−37.6%

Updated to games played on 2 December 2012
Source: K League

=== Top matches ===
Rank	Date	Home	Score	Away	Venue	Attendance	Round	Day of week
1	18 August 2012	FC Seoul	0–2	Suwon Samsung Bluewings	Seoul World Cup Stadium	50,787	28	Saturday
2	5 May 2012	FC Seoul	2–1	Pohang Steelers	Seoul World Cup Stadium	45,982	11	Saturday
3	1 April 2012	Suwon Samsung Bluewings	2–0	FC Seoul	Suwon World Cup Stadium	45,192	5	Sunday
4	3 October 2012	Suwon Samsung Bluewings	1–0	FC Seoul	Suwon World Cup Stadium	43,352	34	Wednesday
5	4 November 2012	FC Seoul	1–1	Suwon Samsung Bluewings	Seoul World Cup Stadium	40,510	38	Sunday
6	20 May 2012	Suwon Samsung Bluewings	2–1	Ulsan Hyundai	Suwon World Cup Stadium	37,519	13	Sunday
7	28 May 2012	FC Seoul	3–1	Incheon United	Seoul World Cup Stadium	31,156	14	Monday
8	13 May 2012	Suwon Samsung Bluewings	4–1	Gwangju FC	Suwon World Cup Stadium	29,019	12	Sunday
9	25 March 2012	FC Seoul	2–1	Jeonbuk Hyundai Motors	Seoul World Cup Stadium	25,811	4	Sunday
10	24 June 2012	FC Seoul	1–1	Ulsan Hyundai	Seoul World Cup Stadium	25,653	17	Sunday

== See also ==
- 2012 in South Korean football
- 2012 Korean FA Cup
- List of South Korean football transfers winter 2011–12
