= Kim Sun-kyu =

South Korean footballer

Personal information
- Date of birth: 7 October 1987 (age 39)
- Place of birth: Yangsan, Korea Republic
- Height: 1.85 m (6 ft 1 in)
- Position: Goalkeeper

Team information
- Current team: FC Anyang
- Number: 31

Youth career
- 2003–2005: Donga High School
- 2006–2009: Dong-A University

Senior career*
Years	Team	Apps	(Gls)
2010–2011	Gyeongnam FC	0	(0)
2012–2014	Daejeon Citizen	78	(0)
2015–	FC Anyang	27	(0)
- * Club domestic league appearances and goals as of 1 December 2016

- Kim Sun-kyu
- Hangul: 김선규
- Hanja: 金善奎
- RR: Gim Seongyu
- MR: Kim Sŏn'gyu

Kim Sun-kyu (born 7 October 1987) is a South Korean footballer who plays as a goalkeeper for K League Challenge side FC Anyang.

He led Dong-A University to win a University Tournament.
