= Leozinho (footballer, born 1988) =

Brazilian footballer

Personal information
- Full name: Leonardo Ferreira
- Date of birth: June 7, 1988 (age 38)
- Place of birth: Fortaleza, Brazil
- Height: 1.70 m (5 ft 7 in)
- Position: Attacking midfielder

Youth career
- 2005–2007: Fortaleza

Senior career*
Years	Team	Apps	(Gls)
2008–2009	Icasa		
2009	Coritiba	11	(2)
2010	Ceará		
2010	Marília	7	(1)
2010	Icasa	9	(1)
2011	São Caetano		
2011	Chapecoense		
2012	Daejeon Citizen	9	(0)
2012	Santa Cruz	8	(2)
2013	Figueirense		
2013	Santa Cruz		
2014	Santa Rita	11	(1)
2014−2016	Boavista		
2016	Fortaleza		
2016	Villa Nova-MG		
2017	Caucaia		
2017	Floresta		
2018	Villa Nova-MG		
2018	América-RN		
2018	Isidro Metapán		
- * Club domestic league appearances and goals

Leonardo Ferreira (born June 7, 1988), or simply Leozinho, is a Brazilian former professional footballer who played as an attacking midfielder.

== Career ==
Leozinho was born in Fortaleza. In late August 2014, he joined Boavista in Portugal. He made his debut at 1 September 2014.

In mid December 2017, Leozinho joined Borneo in Indonesia

In July 2018, Ferreira signed with Isidro Metapán of the Salvadoran Primera División.
