= 2015 Incheon United FC season =

Incheon United F.C.
2015 season
- Chairman: Yoo Jung-bok
- Manager: Kim Do-hoon
- K League Classic: 6th
- Korean FA Cup: Semi-finals
- Top goalscorer: League: Kevin Oris (6); All: Kevin Oris (7)
- Highest home attendance: 10,704 vs Suwon (31 May)
- Lowest home attendance: 1,623 vs Gwangju (1 July)
- Average home league attendance: 5,226
Home colours	Away colours

The 2015 season was Incheon United's eleventh season in the K-League in South Korea. Incheon United competed in the K League Classic and the Korean FA Cup.

== Current squad ==
Note: Flags indicate national team as defined under FIFA eligibility rules; some limited exceptions apply. Players may hold more than one non-FIFA nationality.

No.	Pos.	Nation	Player
1	GK	KOR	Yoo Hyun (captain)
2	DF	KOR	Kwon Wan-kyu
3	DF	KOR	Kim Yong-hwan
4	MF	KOR	Kim Won-sik
5	DF	KOR	Kim Jin-hwan
6	DF	KOR	Yun Joo-yeol
7	MF	KOR	Kim Do-hyuk (vice-captain)
8	MF	KOR	Ahn Jin-beom (on loan from Ulsan)
10	FW	KOR	Lee Chun-soo
11	FW	KOR	Kim In-sung
13	DF	KOR	Yong Hyun-jin
14	MF	KOR	Kim Jae-woong
15	DF	KOR	Kim Dae-jung
16	FW	KOR	Lee Seong-woo
17	FW	KOR	Kim Dae-kyung
18	FW	KOR	Jin Sung-wook

No.	Pos.	Nation	Player
19	FW	BEL	Kevin Oris
20	DF	CRO	Matej Jonjić
21	GK	KOR	Jo Su-huk
22	MF	KOR	Kim Dong-suk
23	MF	KOR	Yun Sang-ho
24	MF	KOR	Park Se-jik
25	DF	KOR	Park Dae-han
26	MF	KOR	Cho Soo-chul
27	FW	KOR	Lee Jin-uk
28	DF	KOR	Baek Seung-won
29	MF	KOR	Lee Joong-kwon
30	MF	KOR	Yun Sang-ho
31	GK	KOR	Lee Tae-hee
44	DF	KOR	Ji Byung-ju
77	DF	KOR	Lee Yun-pyo

=== Out on loan ===
Note: Flags indicate national team as defined under FIFA eligibility rules; some limited exceptions apply. Players may hold more than one non-FIFA nationality.

No.	Pos.	Nation	Player
—	DF	KOR	Kim Kyung-min (to Sangmu for military service)
—	DF	KOR	Kim Chang-hoon (to Sangmu for military service)
—	GK	KOR	Yoon Pyung-guk (to Sangmu for military service)
—	DF	KOR	Choi Jong-hoan (to Sangmu for military service)

No.	Pos.	Nation	Player
—	DF	KOR	Bae Seung-jin (to Police for military service)
—	DF	KOR	An Jae-jun (to Police for military service)
—	DF	KOR	Lee Hyo-kyun (to Anyang)

== Transfers ==
=== In ===
#	Name	POS	Moving from	Mode	Window	Period	Fee	Notes
15	(South Korea) Kim Dae-jung	DF	(South Korea) Daejeon CItizen	End of loan	Winter			
14	(South Korea) Kim Jae-woong	MF	(South Korea) Anyang	End of loan	Winter			
8	(South Korea) Ahn Jin-beom	MF	(South Korea) Ulsan Hyundai	Loan	Winter	One year		
4	(South Korea) Kim Won-sik	MF	(South Korea) Seoul	Loan	Winter			
2	(South Korea) Kwon Wan-kyu	DF	(South Korea) Gyeongnam	Transfer	Winter			
44	(South Korea) Ji Byung-ju	DF	(South Korea) Daegu	Transfer	Winter			
20	(Croatia) Matej Jonjić	DF	(Croatia) Hajduk Split	Transfer	Winter			
2	(South Korea) Kwon Wan-kyu	DF	(South Korea) Gyeongnam	Transfer	Winter			
22	(South Korea) Kim Dong-suk	MF	(South Korea) Seoul	Transfer	Winter			
22	(South Korea) Kim Dong-suk	MF	(South Korea) Seoul	Transfer	Winter			
24	(South Korea) Park Se-jik	MF	(South Korea) Jeonbuk Motors	Transfer	Winter			
22	(South Korea) Kim Dong-suk	MF	(South Korea) Seoul	Transfer	Winter			
29	(South Korea) Lee Joong-gwon	MF	(South Korea) Chunnam Dragons	Transfer	Winter			
22	(South Korea) Kim Dong-suk	MF	(South Korea) Seoul	Transfer	Winter			
25	(South Korea) Park Dae-han	DF	(South Korea) Gangwon	Transfer	Winter			
19	(Belgium) Kevin Oris	FW	(China) Liaoning Whowin	Transfer	Winter			http://sports.news.naver.com/sports/index.nhn?category=soccer&ctg=news&mod=read&office_id=076&article_id=0002682098&date=20150213&page=1
17	(South Korea) Kim Dae-kyung	FW	(South Korea) Suwon Bluewings	Transfer	Winter			
11	(South Korea) Kim In-sung	FW	(South Korea) Jeonbuk Motors	Transfer	Winter			
27	(South Korea) Lee Jin-uk	FW	(South Korea)		Winter			
2	(South Korea) Yun Joo-yeol	DF	(South Korea)		Winter			
28	(South Korea) Baek Seung-won	MF	(South Korea)		Winter			
16	(South Korea) Lee Seong-woo	FW	(South Korea)	Transfer	Winter			

=== Out ===
#	Name	POS	Moving to	Mode	Window	Period	Fee	Notes
9	(South Korea) Seol Ki-hyeon	FW	N/A	Retirement	Winter			Became caretaker coach of Sungkyunkwan University http://sports.news.naver.com/sports/index.nhn?category=soccer&ctg=news&mod=read&office_id=076&article_id=0002691293
3	(South Korea) Lee Sang-hee	DF	N/A	Contract terminated	Winter			
25	(South Korea) Choi Jong-hoan	DF	(South Korea) Sangmu	Loan (military service)	Winter			
31	(South Korea) Yoon Pyung-guk	GK	(South Korea) Sangmu	Loan (military service)	Winter			
4	(South Korea) Bae Seung-jin	DF	(South Korea) Police	Loan (military service)	Winter			
28	(South Korea) Lee Hyo-kyun	FW	(South Korea) Anyang	Loan	Winter			
20	(South Korea) An Jae-jun	DF	(South Korea) Police	Loan (military service)	Winter			
13	(South Korea) Park Tae-min	DF	(South Korea) Seongnam	End of contract	Winter		Free	
23	(South Korea) Nam Joon-jae	FW	(South Korea) Seongnam	End of contract	Winter		Free	
14	(South Korea) Lee Seok-hyun	MF	(South Korea) Seoul	Transfer	Winter		₩300m-400m	http://sports.media.daum.net/sports/soccer/newsview?newsId=20141230182905260
6	(South Korea) Moon Sang-yun	MF	(South Korea) Jeonbuk Motors	Transfer	Winter		₩400m-500m	http://sports.media.daum.net/sports/soccer/newsview?newsId=20150108190304540
8	(South Korea) Koo Bon-sang	MF	(South Korea) Ulsan Hyundai	Transfer	Winter			
7	(Brazil) Ivo	MF	(China) Henan Jianye	Transfer	Winter			
17	(South Korea) Kim Yong-chan	DF	(South Korea) Chungbuk Chungju		Winter			
24	(South Korea) Lim Ha-ram	DF	(South Korea) Suwon City		Winter			
22	(South Korea) Kwon Hyuk-jin	FW			Winter			
32	(South Korea) Jung Hae-gwon	DF			Winter			
36	(South Korea) Kim Tae-jun	FW			Winter			

== Coaching staff ==
=== Senior coaching staff ===
Position	Name
Manager	(South Korea) Kim Bong-gil
Assistant manager	(South Korea) Yoo Dongwoo
Team Manager	(South Korea) Choi Youngsang
Coach	(South Korea) Kim Hyunsoo (South Korea) Myung Jinyoung
Goalkeeper coach	(South Korea) Lee Yong-bal
Physical Coach	(Brazil) Wanderley
Scout	(South Korea) Shin Jin-won
Trainer	(South Korea) Lee Seungjae (South Korea) Lee Dongwon (South Korea) Yang Seungmin
Translator	(South Korea) Chun Jihun

=== Youth coaching staff ===
Position	Name
U-18 Head Coach	(South Korea) Shin Sung-hwan
U-18 Goalkeeper Coach	(South Korea) Kim Lee-sub
U-15 Head Coach	(South Korea) Woo Sung-yong
U-15 Goalkeeper Coach	(South Korea) Yoon Jin-ho
U-15 Coach	(South Korea) Lee Sung-gyu
U-12 Head Coach	(South Korea) Kim Tae-jong
U-12 Coach	(South Korea) Choi Jae-young

== Match results ==
=== K League Classic ===
All times are Korea Standard Time (KST) – UTC+9

Date Round	Home	Score	Away	Location

7 March 1	Incheon	2 – 2	Gwangju	Nam District, Incheon
14:00	Kim Do-hyuk 14' (yellow card) 23'; Park Dae-han (yellow card) 45'; Kim Won-sik (yellow card) 79'; Jeong Jun-yeon 90+2' (o.g.)	Report	Kim Dae-jung 33' (o.g.); Lee Chan-dong (yellow card) 68'; Lee Jong-min 90+4'	Stadium: Sungui Arena; Attendance: 8,012; Referee: Kim Heegon

14 March 2	Suwon	2 – 1	Incheon	Suwon, Gyeonggi Province
14:00	Santos 11' (pen.); Yeom Ki-hun 90+3'	Report	Kim Won-sik (yellow card) 5'; Kim In-sung 74'	Stadium: Big Bird; Attendance: 10,207; Referee: Lee Min-hu

22 March 3	Incheon	0 – 0	Jeonbuk	Nam District, Incheon
16:00	Kwon Wan-kyu (yellow card) 13' (yellow-red card) 70'; Oris (yellow card) 24'; Kim In-sung (yellow card) 39'; Kim Yong-hwan (yellow card) 81'	Report	Cho Sung-hwan (yellow card) 6'; Lee Ho (yellow card) 30'; Eninho (yellow card) 66'	Stadium: Sungui Arena; Attendance: 9,039; Referee: Lee Dongjun

5 April 4	Jeonnam	1 – 0	Incheon	Gwangyang, South Jeolla Province
16:00	Lee Jong-ho 74'	Report	Kim Won-sik (yellow card) 14'; Baek Seung-won (yellow card) 83'	Stadium: Gwangyang Football Stadium; Attendance: 4,336; Referee: Kim Sangwoo

12 April 5	Incheon	1 – 1	Seoul	Nam District, Incheon
14:00	Cho Soo-chul (yellow card) 24' (yellow-red card) 65'; Kim In-sung 50'; Park Dae-han (yellow card) 61'; Oris (yellow card) 68'	Report	Park Chu-young 10' (pen.); Molina (yellow card) 89'	Stadium: Sungui Arena; Attendance: 9,767; Referee: Song Minseok

15 April 6	Seongnam	0 – 0	Incheon	Seongnam, Gyeonggi Province
19:30	Park Tae-min (yellow card) 55'; Jorginho (yellow card) 64'	Report	Park Dae-han (yellow card) 12'; Kim Won-sik (yellow card) 51'; Kim In-sung (yellow card) 77'; Kim Dong-suk (yellow card) 90+2'	Stadium: Tancheon Stadium; Attendance: 1,902; Referee: Kim Sungho

19 April 7	Incheon	1 – 1	Ulsan	Nam District, Incheon
14:00	Kim Dong-suk (yellow card) 10'; Park Se-jik 87'	Report	Kim Tae-hwan 19'; Lee Jae-sung (yellow card) 34'; Koo Bon-sang (yellow card) 90+3'	Stadium: Sungui Arena; Attendance: 2,352; Referee: Lee Min-hu

25 April 8	Incheon	1 – 1	Pohang	Nam District, Incheon
15:00	Kim Jin-hwan 17'; Oris (yellow card) 42'; Kim Jae-woong (yellow card) 72'	Report	Tiago 40'	Stadium: Sungui Arena; Attendance: 5,407; Referee: Ko Hyung-jin

3 May 9	Daejeon	1 – 2	Incheon	Yuseong District, Daejeon
14:00	Adriano 17'; Kim Ki-soo (yellow card) 71'; Sassa (yellow card) 75'	Report	Kim In-sung 11'; Park Dae-han 45+1'; Kim Jin-hwan (yellow card) 66'; Lee Chun-soo (yellow card) 85'	Stadium: Purple Arena; Attendance: 3,219; Referee: Kim Sangwoo

9 May 10	Incheon	1 – 0	Jeju	Nam District, Incheon
16:00	Kim Won-sik (yellow card) 22'; Kim Dong-suk 68'; Jonjić (yellow card) 88'	Report	Jang Eun-kyu (yellow card) 18'; Yoon Bit-garam (yellow card) 63'	Stadium: Sungui Arena; Attendance: 8,178; Referee: Song Minseok

17 May 11	Busan	1 - 2	Incheon	Yeonje District, Busan
14:00	Jonjić 13' (o.g.); Nilson (yellow card) 47'; Noh Haeng-seok (yellow card) 70'; Ku Hyun-jun (yellow card) 82'; Kim Jong-hyuk (yellow card) 90+2'	Report	Park Dae-han (yellow card) 42'; Lee Chun-soo 49' (pen.); Kim Jin-hwan 70'	Stadium: Busan Asiad Main Stadium; Attendance: 4,052; Referee: Lee Dongjun

23 May 12	Jeonbuk	1 – 0	Incheon	Jeonju, North Jeolla Province
16:00	Han Kyo-won (red card) 5'; Choi Bo-kyung (yellow card) 9'; Moon Sang-yun (yellow card) 12'; Edu 49' (pen.); Kwon Sun-tae (yellow card) 61'	Report	Park Dae-han (yellow card) 5'; Kwon Wan-kyu (yellow card) 39'	Stadium: Jeonju Castle; Attendance: 13,543; Referee: Kim Dongjin

31 May 13	Incheon	1 – 1	Suwon	Nam District, Incheon
14:00	Kim Won-sik (yellow card) 14'; Cho Soo-chul 55'; Kwon Wan-kyu (yellow card) 56'	Report	Yang Sang-min 32'; Cho Sung-jin (yellow card) 45+1'	Stadium: Sungui Arena; Attendance: 10,704; Referee: Kim Daeyong

3 June 14	Seoul	1 – 0	Incheon	Mapo District, Seoul
19:30	Jung Jo-gook 16'	Report	Kim Jin-hwan (yellow card) 17'; Park Dae-han (yellow card) 62'	Stadium: Sangam Stadium; Attendance: 5,023; Referee: Woo Sangil

6 June 15	Incheon	1 – 2	Jeonnam	Nam District, Incheon
19:00	Yong Hyun-jin (yellow card) 10'; Oris 43'	Report	Lee Jong-ho 8'; Oršić 20'; Lim Jong-eun (yellow card) 20'; Lee Ji-nam (yellow card) 63'; Lee Chang-min (yellow card) 78'	Stadium: Sungui Arena; Attendance: 3,026; Referee: Kim Sangwoo

17 June 16	Pohang	0 – 2	Incheon	Pohang, North Gyeongsang Province
19:30		Report	Kim Dong-suk 6'; Jonjić (yellow card) 57'; Oris 68'	Stadium: Pohang Steel Yard; Attendance: 4,288; Referee: Kim Sungho

21 June 17	Ulsan	1 – 1	Incheon	Nam District, Ulsan
18:00	Yoo Jun-soo (red card) 12'; Kim Shin-wook 79'	Report	Oris (yellow card) 12'; Kim Jin-hwan 63'; Kwon Wan-kyu (yellow card) 90'	Stadium: Big Crown; Attendance: 2,542; Referee: Lee Min-hu

28 June 18	Incheon	2 – 0	Daejeon	Nam District, Incheon
18:00	Cho Soo-chul 14'; Kim Won-sik (yellow card) 19'; Baek Seung-won (yellow card) 68'; Kim In-sung 75'	Report	Adriano (red card) 19'	Stadium: Sungui Arena; Attendance: 3,466; Referee: Kim Jong-hyeok

1 July 19	Incheon	1 – 0	Gwangju	Nam District, Incheon
19:30	Yoo Hyun (yellow card) 4'; Oris 36' (yellow card) 90+3'; Kwon Wan-kyu (yellow card) 89'	Report	Kim Young-bin (yellow card) 34'; Lee Euddeum (yellow card) 73' (yellow-red card) 76'	Stadium: Sungui Arena; Attendance: 1,623; Referee: Jung Dongshik

4 July 20	Jeju	0 – 0	Incheon	Seogwipo, Jeju Province
19:00	Kim Sang-won (yellow card) 85'	Report	Ahn Jin-beom (yellow card) 45'	Stadium: Wind Force; Attendance: 6,182; Referee: Lee Dongjun

8 July 21	Incheon	3 – 1	Busan	Nam District, Incheon
19:30	Kim Jin-hwan (yellow card) 17'; Lee Chun-soo (yellow card) 25'; Kwon Wan-kyu 70'; Park Se-jik 74'; Kim Won-sik (yellow card) 77'; Lee Hyo-kyun 77'; Jin Sung-wook (yellow card) 86'	Report	Lee Kyung-ryul 9'; Kim Jin-gyu (yellow card) 78'	Stadium: Sungui Arena; Attendance: 2,006; Referee: Kim Sangwoo

12 July 22	Incheon	0 – 1	Seongnam	Nam District, Incheon
18:00	Cho Soo-chul (yellow card) 37'; Kim Won-sik (yellow card) 77'	Report	Yun Young-sun (yellow card) 48'; Kim Do-heon 50'	Stadium: Sungui Arena; Attendance: 2,725; Referee: Kim Heegon

25 July 23	Seoul	2 – 0	Incheon	Mapo District, Seoul
19:00	Lee Woong-hee (yellow card) 40'; Molina 65' (yellow card) 78'; Park Chu-young 83'	Report	Park Dae-han (yellow card) 56'	Stadium: Sangam Stadium; Attendance: 10,454; Referee: Lee Min-hu

12 August 24	Incheon	0 – 2	Pohang	Nam District, Incheon
19:30	Oris (yellow card) 21'; Kim Won-sik (yellow card) 42' (yellow-red card) 49'; Cho Soo-chul (yellow card) 44'	Report	Sin Jin-ho (yellow card) 9' (goal) 89'; Tiago (yellow card) 14'; Park Sung-ho (yellow card) 80'; Kim Seung-dae 90+1'	Stadium: Sungui Arena; Attendance: 5,229; Referee: Kim Sungho

15 August 25	Jeonnam	0 – 2	Incheon	Gwangyang, South Jeolla Province
19:00	Oršić (yellow card) 44'; Lee Chang-min (yellow card) 70'	Report	Lee Chun-soo (yellow card) 17'; Jin Sung-wook 68', 83'; Jo Su-huk (yellow card) 86'; Lee Hyo-kyun (yellow card) 90'	Stadium: Gwangyang Football Stadium; Attendance: 6,715; Referee: Jung Dongshik

19 August 26	Incheon	1 – 0	Jeju	Nam District, Incheon
19:30	Jin Sung-wook 69'; Kim Dong-suk (yellow card) 74'	Report	Yang Joon-a (yellow card) 73'; Oh Ban-suk (yellow card) 78'	Stadium: Sungui Arena; Attendance: 3,021; Referee: Ko Hyung-jin

22 August 27	Jeonbuk	0 – 1	Incheon	Jeonju, North Jeolla Province
19:00	Lee Ju-yong (yellow card) 61'; Luiz Henrique (yellow card) 90+1'	Report	Kim Won-sik (yellow card) 23'; Kim In-sung 66'; Kwon Wan-kyu (yellow card) 70'; Lee Yun-pyo (yellow card) 90'; Yoo Hyun (yellow card) 90+2'	Stadium: Jeonju Castle; Attendance: 23,113; Referee: Lee Dongjun

29 August 28	Incheon	2 – 1	Daejeon	Nam District, Incheon
19:00	Oris 12'; Lee Chun-soo 36'; Jin Sung-wook (yellow card) 68'; Lee Yun-pyo (yellow card) 70'; Kwon Wan-kyu (yellow card) 81'; Kim Dong-suk (yellow card) 86'	Report	Han Eui-kwon 10'	Stadium: Sungui Arena; Attendance: 5,598; Referee: Kim Heegon

9 September 29	Gwangju	1 – 0	Incheon	Seo District, Gwangju
19:00	Fábio Neves (yellow card) 42'; Lee Chan-dong (yellow card) 45'; Kim Ho-nam 58'	Report	Lee Chun-soo (yellow card) 45'	Stadium: Guus Hiddink Stadium; Attendance: 1,419; Referee: Song Minseok

12 September 30	Suwon	1 – 0	Incheon	Suwon, Gyeonggi Province
16:00	Cho Sung-jin (yellow card) 17'; Santos 40'	Report	Kim Won-sik (yellow card) 27'; Park Dae-han (yellow card) 52'	Stadium: Big Bird; Attendance: 11,372; Referee: Kim Sungho

19 September 31	Incheon	2 – 1	Busan	Nam District, Incheon
14:00	Oris 45+2'; Park Se-jik 52'; Kim Dong-suk (yellow card) 55'; Jo Su-huk (yellow card) 76'; Kim In-sung (yellow card) 78'	Report	Kim Yong-tae (yellow card) 57'; Lee Kyung-ryul 74'; Weslley (yellow card) 78'	Stadium: Sungui Arena; Attendance: 5,951; Referee: Kim Dongjin

23 September 32	Incheon	1 – 2	Ulsan	Nam District, Incheon
19:30	Oris 39'; Jin Sung-wook (yellow card) 78'	Report	Koo Bon-sang 6'; Yang Dong-hyun (yellow card) 51'; Kim Shin-wook 90+6'	Stadium: Sungui Arena; Attendance: 4,566; Referee: Kim Jong-hyeok

==== League table ====
Pos	Team	Pld	W	D	L	GF	GA	GD	Pts
6	Jeju United	38	14	8	16	55	56	−1	50
7	Ulsan Hyundai	38	13	14	11	54	45	+9	53
8	Incheon United	38	13	12	13	35	32	+3	51
9	Jeonnam Dragons	38	12	13	13	46	51	−5	49
10	Gwangju FC	38	10	12	16	35	44	−9	42

Source: K League
Rules for classification: 1) Points; 2) Goal difference; 3) Goals scored; 4) Wins

==== Results summary ====
Overall								Home						Away					
Pld	W	D	L	GF	GA	GD	Pts	W	D	L	GF	GA	GD	W	D	L	GF	GA	GD
3	0	2	1	3	4	−1	2	0	2	0	2	2	0	0	0	1	1	2	−1

==== Results by round ====
Round	1	2	3	4	5	6	7	8	9	10	11	12	13	14	15	16	17	18	19	20	21	22	23	24	25	26	27	28	29	30	31	32	33	34	35	36	37	38
Ground	H	A	H	A	H	A	H	H	A	H	A	A	H	A	H	A	A	H	H	A	H	H	A	H	A	H	A	H	A	A	H	H						
Result	D	L	D	L	D	D	D	D	W	W	W	L	D	L	L	W	D	W	W	D	W	L	L	L	W	W	W	W	L	L	W	L						
Position	5	9	9	11	11	10	10	10	9	8	5	7	8	10	10	9	9	8	6	7	5	7	7	8	7	7	6	6	6	6	6	6						

Updated to match(es) played on 23 September 2015. Source: League Fixtures and Results
A = Away; H = Home; W = Win; D = Draw; L = Loss

=== Korean FA Cup ===
29 April Round of 32	Incheon	2 – 0	Bucheon	Nam District, Incheon
19:30	Oris 5'; Kim Jin-hwan 55'	Report		Stadium: Sungui Arena; Attendance: 848

24 June Round of 16	Cheonan City	0 – 1	Incheon	Cheonan, South Chungcheong Province
19:00	Lee Jong-min (yellow card) 43'; Park Dong-hyuk (yellow card) 73'	Report	Kim Jae-woong (yellow card) 25'; Kim Jin-hwan 85'; Kim Won-sik (yellow card) 90+1'	Stadium: Cheonan Football Center; Attendance: 1,300

22 July Quarterfinals	Jeju	0 – 2 (a.e.t.)	Incheon	Seogwipo, Jeju Province
20:00	Oh Ban-suk (yellow card) 19'; Karanga (yellow card) 34'	Report	Cho Soo-chul (yellow card) 77'; Jonjić (yellow card) 81'; Kwon Wan-kyu 92'; Kim Do-hyuk 108'	Stadium: Wind Force; Attendance: 917

== Squad statistics ==
=== Appearances ===
Statistics accurate as of match played 29 August 2014

No.	Nat.	Pos.	Name	League		FA Cup		Appearances		Goals
No.	Nat.	Pos.	Name	Apps	Goals	Apps	Goals	App (sub)	Total	Goals
1	(South Korea)	GK	Kwon Jung-hyuk	28	0	0	0	28 (0)	28	0
2	(South Korea)	DF	Yong Hyun-jin	23 (1)	0	0	0	23 (1)	14	0
3	(South Korea)	DF	Lee Sang-hee	0	0	0	0	0	0	0
4	(South Korea)	MF	Bae Seung-jin	10 (1)	0	0	0	10 (1)	11	0
5	(South Korea)	DF	Kim Jin-hwan	1 (1)	0	0	0	1 (1)	2	0
6	(South Korea)	MF	Moon Sang-yoon	18 (13)	3	0	0	18 (13)	31	3
7	(Brazil)	MF	Ivo	26 (7)	7	0	0	26 (7)	33	7
8	(South Korea)	MF	Koo Bon-sang	32 (1)	0	0	0	32 (1)	33	0
9	(South Korea)	FW	Seol Ki-hyeon	6 (1)	0	0	0	6 (1)	7	0
10	(South Korea)	FW	Lee Chun-soo	27 (1)	1	0	0	27 (1)	28	1
13	(South Korea)	DF	Park Tae-min	36	1	0	0	36 (0)	36	1
14	(South Korea)	MF	Lee Seok-hyun	14 (11)	1	0	1	14 (11)	25	2
16	(South Korea)	DF	Lee Yun-pyo	37	0	0	0	37 (0)	37	0
17	(South Korea)	DF	Kim Yong-chan	0	0	0	0	0	0	0
18	(South Korea)	GK	Jo Su-huk	0	0	0	0	0	0	0
19	(Brazil)	FW	Diogo	11	1	0	0	11 (0)	1	0
20	(South Korea)	DF	An Jae-jun	36	0	0	0	36 (0)	36	0
21	(South Korea)	MF	Kim Do-hyuk	24 (2)	2	0	0	24 (2)	26	2
22	(South Korea)	FW	Kwon Hyuk-jin	0 (6)	0	0	0	0 (6)	6	0
23	(South Korea)	FW	Nam Joon-jae	14 (3)	3	0	0	14 (3)	17	3
24	(South Korea)	DF	Lim Ha-ram	4 (8)	0	0	0	4 (8)	12	0
25	(South Korea)	DF	Choi Jong-hoan	20 (10)	3	0	0	20 (10)	30	3
26	(South Korea)	DF	Kim Yong-hwan	12 (2)	0	0	0	12 (2)	14	0
27	(South Korea)	MF	Kim Bong-jin	0	0	0	0	0	0	0
28	(South Korea)	FW	Lee Hyo-kyun	17 (12)	4	0	0	17 (12)	29	4
29	(South Korea)	FW	Jin Sung-wook	4 (22)	6	0	0	4 (22)	26	6
30	(South Korea)	MF	Yun Sang-ho	0	0	0	0	0	0	0
31	(South Korea)	GK	Yoon Pyung-guk	0	0	0	0	0	0	0
32	(South Korea)	DF	Jung Hae-gwon	0	0	0	0	0	0	0
33	(South Korea)	MF	Cho Soo-chul	3 (3)	1	0	0	3 (3)	6	1
34	(South Korea)	DF	Kim Sung-eun	0	0	0	0	0	0	0
35	(South Korea)	GK	Lee Tae-hee	0	0	0	0	0	0	0
36	(South Korea)	DF	Kim Tae-jun	0	0	0	0	0	0	0
53	(South Korea)	GK	Yoo Hyun	10	0	0	0	10 (0)	10	0
11	(Montenegro)	FW	Stefan Nikolić	4 (3)	0	0	0	4 (3)	7	0
15	(South Korea)	DF	Kim Dae-joong	0	0	0	0	0	0	0
19	(Brazil)	FW	João Paulo	1 (4)	0	0	0	1 (4)	5	0

=== Goals ===
No.	Nation	Position	Name	K-League	KFA Cup	Total
19	(Belgium)	FW	Kevin Oris	6	1	7
11	(South Korea)	FW	Kim In-sung	5	0	5
11	(South Korea)	DF	Kim Jin-hwan	3	2	5
18	(South Korea)	FW	Jin Sung-wook	3	0	3
24	(South Korea)	MF	Park Se-jik	3	0	3
22	(South Korea)	MF	Kim Dong-suk	2	0	2
10	(South Korea)	FW	Lee Chun-soo	2	0	2
26	(South Korea)	MF	Cho Soo-chul	2	0	2
7	(South Korea)	DF	Kwon Wan-kyu	1	1	2
7	(South Korea)	MF	Kim Do-hyuk	1	1	2
33	(South Korea)	FW	Lee Hyo-kyun	1	0	1
25	(South Korea)	DF	Park Dae-han	1	0	1
7	(South Korea)	DF	Kwon Wan-kyu	1	1	2
/	/	/	Own Goals	1	0	1
/	/	/	TOTALS	30	0	30

=== Assists ===
No.	Nation	Position	Name	K-League	KFA Cup	Total
10	(South Korea)	FW	Lee Chun-soo	1	0	1
26	(South Korea)	MF	Cho Soo-chul	1	1	2
24	(South Korea)	MF	Park Se-jik	0	1	1
18	(South Korea)	FW	Jin Sung-wook	0	1	1
33	(South Korea)	FW	Lee Hyo-kyun	0	1	1
/	/	/	TOTALS	2	4	

=== Discipline ===
No.	Nation	Position	Name	K-League			KFA Cup			Total		
No.	Nation	Position	Name	Booked	(yellow card) (yellow-red card)	Sent off (straight red)	Booked	(yellow card) (yellow-red card)	Sent off (straight red)	Booked	(yellow card) (yellow-red card)	Sent off (straight red)
1	(South Korea)	GK	Yoo Hyun	2	0	0	0	0	0	2	0	0
2	(South Korea)	DF	Kwon Wan-kyu	6	1	0	0	0	0	6	1	0
3	(South Korea)	DF	Kim Yong-hwan	1	0	0	0	0	0	1	0	0
4	(South Korea)	MF	Kim Won-sik	11	1	0	1	0	0	12	1	0
5	(South Korea)	DF	Kim Jin-hwan	3	0	0	0	0	0	3	0	0
7	(South Korea)	MF	Kim Do-hyuk	1	0	0	0	0	0	1	0	0
8	(South Korea)	MF	Ahn Jin-beom	1	0	0	0	0	0	1	0	0
10	(South Korea)	FW	Lee Chun-soo	4	0	0	0	0	0	4	0	0
11	(South Korea)	FW	Kim In-sung	3	0	0	0	0	0	3	0	0
13	(South Korea)	DF	Yong Hyun-jin	1	0	0	0	0	0	1	0	0
18	(South Korea)	FW	Jin Sung-wook	3	0	0	0	0	0	3	0	0
19	(Belgium)	FW	Kevin Oris	6	0	0	0	0	0	6	0	0
20	(Croatia)	DF	Matej Jonjić	2	0	0	3	0	0	3	0	0
21	(South Korea)	GK	Jo So-huk	2	0	0	0	0	0	2	0	0
22	(South Korea)	MF	Kim Dong-suk	5	0	0	0	0	0	5	0	0
25	(South Korea)	DF	Park Dae-han	8	0	1	0	0	0	8	0	1
26	(South Korea)	MF	Cho Soo-chul	2	1	0	1	0	0	3	1	0
28	(South Korea)	DF	Baek Seung-won	2	0	0	0	0	0	2	0	0
33	(South Korea)	FW	Lee Hyo-kyun	1	0	0	0	0	0	1	0	0
77	(South Korea)	DF	Lee Yun-pyo	2	0	0	0	0	0	2	0	0
	(South Korea)	FW	Kim Jae-woong	1	0	0	1	0	0	2	0	0
/	/	/	TOTALS	66	3	0	4	0	0	70	3	0
