= 2016 Incheon United FC season =

Incheon United F.C.
2016 season
- Chairman: Yoo Jung-bok
- Manager: Kim Do-hoon (until 31 August 2016); Lee Ki-hyung (caretaker) (since 1 September 2016)
- K League Classic: 10th
- Korean FA Cup: Quarter-finals
- Top goalscorer: League: Kevin Oris (8 goals); All: Kevin Oris (8 goals)
- Highest home attendance: 12,587 vs Seoul (10 September)
Home colours	Away colours

The 2016 season was Incheon United's twelfth season in the K-League in South Korea. Incheon United competed in the K League Classic and the Korean FA Cup.

== Current squad ==
As of 27 September 2016

Note: Flags indicate national team as defined under FIFA eligibility rules; some limited exceptions apply. Players may hold more than one non-FIFA nationality.

No.	Pos.	Nation	Player
1	GK	KOR	Jo Su-hyuk
3	DF	KOR	Kim Yong-hwan
4	DF	KOR	Kim Kyung-min
5	MF	KOR	Kim Tae-su
6	MF	KOR	Lee Joong-gwon
7	MF	KOR	Kim Do-hyuk
8	MF	KOR	Kim Dong-suk (Captain)
9	FW	KOR	Song Je-Heon
10	FW	BEL	Kevin Oris
11	FW	KOR	Jin Sung-wook
13	MF	KOR	Lee Hyun-sung
14	MF	KOR	Yun Sang-ho
15	DF	KOR	Kim Dae-joong
16	DF	KOR	Lee Yun-pyo
17	DF	KOR	Kwon Wan-kyu
19	MF	KOR	Song Si-woo

No.	Pos.	Nation	Player
20	DF	CRO	Matej Jonjić
21	GK	KOR	Lee Tae-hee
23	MF	KOR	Kim Se-hun
24	MF	KOR	Park Se-jik
25	DF	KOR	Park Dae-han
26	MF	KOR	Park Byun-hyun
27	FW	KOR	Lee Jin-wook
29	DF	KOR	Cho Byung-Kuk
36	FW	KOR	Kim Dae-kyung
41	GK	KOR	Kim Da-sol
44	MF	KOR	Bae Seung-jin
55	MF	KOR	Cho Young-Jun
60	MF	VIE	Lương Xuân Trường (on loan from Hoàng Anh Gia Lai)
77	DF	KOR	An Jae-jun
88	FW	MKD	Krste Velkoski

== Transfers ==
=== In ===
#	Name	POS	Moving from	Mode	Window	Period	Fee	Notes
5	(South Korea) Kim Tae-su	MF	(South Korea) Pohang	Transfer	Winter		Free	
9	(South Korea) Song Je-Heon	FW	(South Korea) Jeonbuk	Transfer	Winter		Free	
29	(South Korea) Cho Byung-kuk	DF	(Thailand) Chonburi	Transfer	Winter		Free	
31	(South Korea) Kim Kyo-bin	GK	(South Korea) Gyeongnam	Transfer	Winter		Free	
37	(South Korea) Park Jong-jin	MF	(South Korea) Suwon Samsung	Transfer	Winter			
55	(South Korea) Cho Young-Jun	MF	(South Korea) Yongin	Transfer	Winter		Free	
41	(South Korea) Kim Da-sol	GK	(South Korea) Daejeon	Transfer	Winter		Free	
88	(North Macedonia) Krste Velkoski	FW	(North Macedonia) FK Sarajevo	Transfer	Winter			
35	(South Korea) Yoo Jae-ho	DF	(South Korea) Gimpo	End of loan	Winter			
	(South Korea) Yun Ju-yeol	DF	(South Korea) Cheonan	End of loan	Winter			
6	(South Korea) Lee Joong-gwon	MF	(South Korea) Cheonan	End of loan	Winter			
60	(Vietnam) Lương Xuân Trường	MF	(Vietnam) Hoàng Anh Gia Lai	Loan	Winter			
13	(South Korea) Lee Hyun-sung	MF	(South Korea) Yong In Uni.	Transfer	Winter			
32	(South Korea) Hong Jung-ryul	FW	(South Korea) Incheon Uni.	Transfer	Winter			
19	(South Korea) Song Si-woo	FW	(South Korea) Dankook Uni.	Transfer	Winter			
23	(South Korea) Kim Se-hoon	MF	(South Korea) Chung-Ang Uni.	Transfer	Winter			
22	(South Korea) Kwak Sung-uk	MF	(South Korea) Ajou Uni.	Transfer	Winter			
	(South Korea) Kim Tae-hoon	MF	(South Korea) Daegu Uni.	Transfer	Winter			
26	(South Korea) Park Byun-hyun	MF	(South Korea) Catholic Kwandong Uni.	Transfer	Winter			
30	(South Korea) Won Dong-geun	MF	(South Korea) Halla Uni.	Transfer	Winter			
18	(South Korea) Han Nam-kyu	FW	(South Korea) Soongsil Uni.	Transfer	Winter			

=== Out ===
#	Name	POS	Moving to	Mode	Window	Period	Fee	Notes
7	(South Korea) Kim In-sung	FW	(South Korea) Ulsan Hyundai	Transfer	Winter			
1	(South Korea) Yoo Hyun	GK	(South Korea) FC Seoul	Transfer	Winter			
26	(South Korea) Cho Soo-chul	MF	(South Korea) Pohang	Transfer	Winter		Free	
4	(South Korea) Lim Ha-ram	DF	(South Korea) Suwon FC	Transfer	Winter			
22	(South Korea) Kwon Hyuk-jin	FW	(South Korea) Suwon FC	Transfer	Winter			
10	(South Korea) Lee Seul-gi	FW	(South Korea) Anyang	Transfer	Winter		Free	
14	(South Korea) Kim Jin-hwan	DF	(South Korea) Gwangju	Transfer	Winter			
	(South Korea) Yun Ju-yeol	DF	(South Korea) Gimpo	Transfer	Winter			
	(South Korea) Paik Seung-won	DF	(South Korea) Gimpo	Transfer	Winter			
43	(South Korea) Kim Chang-hoon	DF	(South Korea) Cheonan	Transfer	Winter		Free	
10	(South Korea) Lee Chun-soo	FW	N/A	Retirement	Winter			
15	(South Korea) Kim Won-Sik	MF	(South Korea) FC Seoul	End of loan	Winter			
16	(South Korea) An Jin-beom	MF	(South Korea) Ulsan Hyundai	End of loan	Winter			
33	(Japan) Tomoki Wada	MF	(Japan) Vissel Kobe	End of loan	Winter			
16	(South Korea) Lee Seung-woo	FW	(South Korea) Ulsan Hyundai Mipo	Loan	Winter			
45	(South Korea) Ji Byung-ju	DF	(South Korea) Bucheon	Loan	Winter			
18	(South Korea) Han Nam-kyu	FW	(South Korea) Cheongju City	Loan	Summer			
22	(South Korea) Kwak Sung-uk	MF	(South Korea) Ulsan Hyundai Mipo	Transfer	Summer			
28	(South Korea) Lee Hyo-kyun	FW	(South Korea) Bucheon	Loan	Summer			
30	(South Korea) Won Dong-geun	FW	(South Korea) Cheongju City	Transfer	Summer			
33	(South Korea) Kim Tae-hoon	MF	(South Korea) Cheongju City	Transfer	Summer			
32	(South Korea) Hong Jung-ryul	FW	(South Korea) Cheongju City	Transfer	Summer			
31	(South Korea) Kim Kyo-bin	GK	(South Korea) Jeonnam	Transfer	Summer			
35	(South Korea) Yoo Jae-ho	DF	(Thailand) Pattaya United	Transfer	Summer			

=== Youth coaching staff ===
Position	Name
U-18 Head Coach	(South Korea) Lim Joong-yong
U-18 Goalkeeper Coach	(South Korea) Yoon Jin-ho
U-15 Head Coach	(South Korea) Woo Sung-yong
U-15 Goalkeeper Coach	(South Korea) Choi Seung-ju
U-15 Coach	(South Korea) Kim Tae-jong
U-12 Head Coach	(South Korea) Lee Seong-kyu
U-12 Coach	(South Korea) Choi Jae-yeong

== Match results ==
=== K League Classic ===
All times are Korea Standard Time (KST) – UTC+9

Date Round	Home	Score	Away	Location

13 March 1	Jeju	3 – 1	Incheon	Seogwipo, Jeju Province
14:00	Lee Kwang-seon 32'; Chung Woon 79'; Kweon Han-jin 83'	Report	Kim Kyung-min (yellow card) 2'; Jonjić (yellow card) 39'; Park Se-Jik 63'; Kevin (yellow card) 73'; Yun Sang-ho (yellow card) 78'; Lee Yun-pyo (yellow card) 81'	Stadium: Wind Force; Attendance: 6,261; Referee: Kim Seong-ho

20 March 2	Incheon	0 – 2	Pohang	Nam District, Incheon
14:00		Report	Shim Dong-woon 20'; Bae Seul-ki (yellow card) 43'; Moon Chang-jin 68'	Stadium: Sungui Arena; Attendance: 10,722; Referee: Song Min-seok

2 April 3	Seoul	3 – 1	Incheon	Mapo District, Seoul
16:00	Park Chu-young 14' (pen.), 60'; Ju Se-jong (yellow card) 31'; Adriano 90+2'	Report	Park Dae-han (yellow card) 38'; Song Je-heon 90+4'	Stadium: Sangam Stadium; Attendance: 19,318; Referee: Park Phil-jun

9 April 4	Incheon	2 – 3	Seongnam	Nam District, Incheon
16:00	Song Je-heon 42'; Kevin 65'; Jonjić (yellow card) 79'	Report	Hwang Ui-jo 5', 21'; Tiago 67'	Stadium: Sungui Arena; Attendance: 2,850; Referee: Kim Sang-woo

13 April 5	Jeonbuk	1 – 1	Incheon	Jeonju, North Jeolla Province
14:00	Choi Kyu-baek (yellow card) 75'; Lee Dong-gook 83'	Report	Park Dae-han (yellow card) 69'; Song Si-woo 90'	Stadium: Jeonju Castle; Attendance: 11,176; Referee: Park Byung-jin

16 April 6	Incheon	1 – 1	Suwon	Nam District, Incheon
14:00	Yun Sang-ho (yellow card) 66'; Song Si-woo 90+6'	Report	Jang Hyun-soo (yellow card) 28'; Oh Jang-eun 37' (yellow card) 80'; Kwak Kwang-seon (yellow card) 49'; Koo Ja-ryong (yellow card) 85'; No Dong-geon (yellow card) 90+4'; Kwon Chang-hoon (yellow card) 90+5'	Stadium: Sungui Arena; Attendance: 3,538; Referee: Kim Seong-ho

23 April 7	Suwon FC	0 – 0	Incheon	Suwon, Gyeonggi Province
16:00	Kim Byung-oh (yellow card) 64'; Kim Jong-gook (yellow card) 87'; Hwang Jae-hun (yellow card) 90+2'	Report	Park Dae-han (yellow card) 75'; Kevin (yellow card) 78'; Song Si-woo (yellow card) 89'	Stadium: Suwon Sports Complex; Attendance: 3,428; Referee: Kim Woo-seong

1 May 8	Incheon	0 – 1	Ulsan	Nam District, Incheon
14:00	Jonjić (yellow card) 70'	Report	Kim Seung-jun 2'; Kim Yong-dae (yellow card) 83'	Stadium: Sungui Arena; Attendance: 4,395; Referee: Kim Dong-jin

5 May 9	Incheon	0 – 0	Jeonnam	Nam District, Incheon
14:00	Park Se-jik (yellow card) 89'	Report	Lee Ji-nam (yellow card) 53'; Jeong Seok-min (yellow card) 59'	Stadium: Sungui Arena; Attendance: 6,268; Referee: Yun Sang-ho

15 May 10	Sangju	4 – 2	Incheon	Sangju, North Gyeongsang Province
14:00	Song Je-heon 10'; Kevin 25' (yellow card) 28'; Cho Byung-kuk (yellow card) 78'	Report	Kim Sung-hwan (yellow card) 15'; Lee Woong-hee 34'; Park Gi-dong 41', 55'; Lim Sang-hyub 73'	Stadium: Sangju Civic Stadium; Attendance: 1,937; Referee: Kim Sang-woo

22 May 11	Incheon	0 – 1	Gwangju	Nam District, Incheon
16:00	Cho Byung-kuk (yellow card) 35'; Lee Hyo-kyun (red card) 44'; Song Si-woo (yellow card) 74'	Report	Lee Euddeum (yellow card) 28'; Kim Min-hyeok 90+1'; Jo Ju-young (yellow card) 90+2'	Stadium: Sungui Arena; Attendance: 4,755; Referee: Ko Hyung-jin

28 May 12	Seongnam	0 – 1	Incheon	Seongnam, Gyeonggi Province
14:00	Kim Tae-yoon (yellow card) 38'; Lim Chae-min (yellow card) 88'	Report	Park Se-jik (yellow card) 16'; Kevin 79'; Jo Su-huk (yellow card) 90+1'; Kim Yong-hwan (yellow card) 90+3'	Stadium: Tancheon Stadium; Attendance: 7,712; Referee: Kim Dong-jin

11 June 13	Suwon	2 - 2	Incheon	Suwon, Gyeonggi Province
18:00	Santos 64' (pen.), 90+6'; Cho Won-hee (yellow card) 74'; Kwak Kwang-seon (yellow card) 90+6'	Report	Lee Yun-pyo (yellow card) 47' (yellow-red card) 86'; Kim Dae-jung (yellow card) 71'; Kim Do-hyuk 75'; Song Si-woo 90+2'	Stadium: Big Bird; Attendance: 12,828; Referee: Lee Dong-jun

15 June 14	Incheon	2 – 0	Suwon FC	Nam District, Incheon
19:30	Kwon Wan-kyu (yellow card) 23'; Velkoski 41'; Jin Sung-wook 57'	Report	Lim Ha-ram (yellow card) 38' (yellow-red card) 69'; Leijer (yellow card) 41'; Lee Seung-yeoul (yellow card) 79'	Stadium: Sungui Arena; Attendance: 3,247; Referee: Kim Woo-seong

18 June 15	Incheon	0 – 0	Jeonbuk	Nam District, Incheon
19:30	Kwon Wan-kyu (yellow card) 25'	Report	Lee Jae-sung (yellow card) 43'; Choi Kyu-baek (yellow card) 61'; Kim Bo-kyung (yellow card) 85'	Stadium: Sungui Arena; Attendance: 9,639; Referee: Ko Hyung-jin

25 June 16	Jeonnam	1 – 0	Incheon	Gwangyang, South Jeolla Province
16:00	Oršić 7'; Bang Dae-jong (yellow card) 65'; Yang Joon-a (yellow card) 77' (yellow-red card) 90+1'; Choi Hyo-jin (yellow card) 86' (yellow-red card) 90+5'	Report	Jonjić (yellow card) 32'; Lee Yun-pyo (yellow card) 36' (yellow-red card) 70'; Kevin (yellow card) 79'; Kim Do-hyuk (yellow card) 90+3'	Stadium: Gwangyang Football Stadium; Attendance: 3,349; Referee: Kim Sang-woo

29 June 17	Incheon	1 – 0	Sangju	Nam District, Incheon
19:00	Kim Yong-hwan (yellow card) 34'; Velkoski 66'	Report	Kim Oh-gyu (yellow card) 32'; Choi Hyun-tae (yellow card) 79'; Kim Sung-hwan (yellow card) 90+2'	Stadium: Sungui Arena; Attendance: 2,922; Referee: Kim Jong-hyuk

3 July 18	Incheon	2 – 1	Jeju	Nam District, Incheon
18:00	Yun Sang-ho (yellow card) 6'; Song Si-woo 89'; Kim Dae-joong 90+3'	Report	Lee Keun-ho 85'	Stadium: Sungui Arena; Attendance: 2,829; Referee: Kim Dong-jin

9 July 19	Gwangju	2 – 2	Incheon	Seo District, Gwangju
19:00	Jung Jo-gook 2', 27' (pen.); Joo Hyeon-woo (yellow card) 21'; Kim Young-bin (yellow card) 28'; Lee Euddeum (yellow card) 80'	Report	Kwon Wan-kyu (yellow card) 48'; Kim Tae-su 75'; Lee Yun-pyo 80'; Song Si-woo (yellow card) 82'; Kevin (yellow card) 89'	Stadium: Guus Hiddink Stadium; Attendance: 2,231; Referee: Woo Sang-il

17 July 20	Incheon	1 – 2	Seoul	Nam District, Incheon
18:00	Kevin Oris 8'; Yun Sang-ho (yellow card) 18'	Report	Kim Tae-su 26' (o.g.); Park Chu-young 54'; Yun Ju-tae (yellow card) 74'; Kim Nam-chun (yellow card) 86'	Stadium: Sungui Arena; Attendance: 14,246; Referee: Park Pil-jun

20 July 21	Ulsan	1 – 3	Incheon	Nam District, Ulsan
19:30	Lee Jeong-hyeop 87'	Report	Kevin 50', 64'; Park Se-jik 56'; Park Dae-han (yellow card) 68'	Stadium: Big Crown; Attendance: 6,642; Referee: Kim Sung-ho

23 July 22	Pohang	3 – 1	Incheon	Pohang, North Gyeongsang Province
19:00	Lulinha 23' (pen.); Yang Dong-hyun 43', 79'; Bae Seul-ki (yellow card) 52'; Ali (yellow card) 90'	Report	Kevin 77'	Stadium: Pohang Steel Yard; Attendance: 5,619; Referee: Jung Dong-sik

31 July 23	Incheon	2 – 2	Seongnam	Nam District, Incheon
18:00	Kim Do-hyuk 21'; Kevin (yellow card) 47' (goal) 56'	Report	Lee Tae-hee (yellow card) 21'; Sung Bong-jae 39'; Kim Do-heon 70' (yellow card) 73'; Yeon Je-woon (yellow card) 90+4'	Stadium: Sungui Arena; Attendance: 3,986; Referee: Kim Jong-hyuk

10 August 24	Gwangju	1 – 1	Incheon	Seo District, Gwangju
19:00	Jung Jo-gook 9'; Lee Min-ki (yellow card) 34'	Report	Kim Do-hyuk 6' (yellow card) 79'; Kim Yong-hwan (yellow card) 44'	Stadium: Guus Hiddink Stadium; Attendance: 1,863; Referee: Lee Dong-jun

13 August 25	Jeonnam	2 – 1	Incheon	Gwangyang, South Jeolla Province
19:00	Jair 9'; Ko Tae-won (yellow card) 19'; Kim Young-wook (yellow card) 80'; Heo Yong-joon 90+3'; Bae Chun-suk (yellow card) 90+5'	Report	Jin Sung-wook (yellow card) 2'; Velkoski 17'; Park Jong-jin (yellow card) 36'; Cho Byung-Kuk (yellow card) 61'	Stadium: Gwangyang Football Stadium; Attendance: 2,697; Referee: Song Min-suk

17 August 26	Incheon	1 – 3	Jeonbuk	Nam District, Incheon
20:00	Velkoski 36'; Jin Sung-wook (yellow card) 50'; Park Dae-han (yellow card) 73'	Report	Han Kyo-won (yellow card) 2'; Edu (yellow card) 26'; Lee Jong-ho 47' (yellow card) 49'; Kim Hyung-il (yellow card) 59'; Lopes (yellow card) 73' (goal) 90'; Kim Shin-wook 77'	Stadium: Sungui Arena; Attendance: 4,350; Referee: Jung Dong-sik

21 August 27	Incheon	0 - 1	Jeju	Nam District, Incheon
18:00	Kim Dong-suk (yellow card) 4'; Kevin (yellow card) 80'	Report	Wanderson 41'; Kim Ho-jun (yellow card) 83'	Stadium: Sungui Arena; Attendance: 4,512; Referee: Kim Woo-sung

27 August 28	Suwon FC	2 – 0	Incheon	Suwon, Gyeonggi Province
19:00	Bruce 39' (pen.), 78'	Report	Jo Su-hyuk (yellow card) 37'; Kevin (yellow card) 43'; Lee Yun-pyo (yellow card) 59'; Cho Byung-Kuk (yellow card) 77'	Stadium: Suwon Sports Complex; Attendance: 4,213; Referee: Park Pil-jun

10 September 29	Incheon	1 – 0	Seoul	Nam District, Incheon
18:00	Cho Byung-Kuk 30'; Kim Kyung-min (yellow card) 88'; Kim Do-hyuk (yellow card) 90+5'	Report	Ko Kwang-min (yellow card) 28'; Kwak Tae-hwi (yellow card) 90+6'	Stadium: Sungui Arena; Attendance: 12,587; Referee: Jung Dong-sik

18 September 30	Incheon	0 – 0	Sangju	Nam District, Incheon
18:00	Yun Sang-ho (yellow card) 62'; Jonjić (yellow card) 83'	Report	Lee Kyung-ryul (yellow card) 52'; Cho Ji-hun (yellow card) 64'	Stadium: Sungui Arena; Attendance: 4,563; Referee: Song Min-suk

21 September 31	Pohang	0 – 1	Incheon	Pohang, North Gyeongsang Province
19:30	Jung Won-jin (yellow card) 44'; Yang Dong-hyun (yellow card) 84'; Kim Gwang-seok (yellow card) 90+1'	Report	Lee Yun-pyo (yellow card) 40'; Jonjić (yellow card) 83'; Park Se-jik 90+2' (pen.)	Stadium: Pohang Steel Yard; Attendance: 3,711; Referee: Ko Hyung-jin

24 September 32	Incheon	2 – 2	Suwon	Nam District, Incheon
15:00	Kwon Wan-kyu (yellow card) 11'; Kim Dae-joong (yellow card) 21'; Bae Seung-jin (yellow card) 37'; Kim Yong-hwan 86' (yellow card) 89'; Jin Sung-wook 90+3'	Report	Shin Se-gye (yellow card) 13'; Johnathan 64'; Lee Jong-sung (yellow card) 70'; Yeom Ki-hun 80'	Stadium: Sungui Arena; Attendance: 8,641; Referee: Kim Seong-ho

2 October 33	Ulsan	2 – 3	Incheon	Nam District, Ulsan
14:00	Kim Seung-jun 20'; Mendy 57'; Kim Sung-hwan (yellow card) 90+3'	Report	Kim Yong-dae 3' (o.g.); Kwon Wan-kyu 50'; Kim Do-hyuk (yellow card) 54'; Song Si-woo 65'	Stadium: Big Crown; Attendance: 4,851; Referee: Jung Dong-sik

16 October 34	Seongnam	0 – 0	Incheon	Seongnam, Gyeonggi Province
15:00	Jo Jae-cheol (yellow card) 67'	Report	Park Se-jik (yellow card) 25'; Yun Sang-ho (yellow card) 37'	Stadium: Tancheon Stadium; Attendance: 3,440; Referee: Kim Jong-hyuk

23 October 35	Incheon	2 – 0	Gwangju	Nam District, Incheon
15:00	Kim Yong-hwan (yellow card) 5' (goal) 51'; Jin Sung-wook 58'	Report	Yeo Reum (yellow card) 41'; Bonnes (yellow card) 41'	Stadium: Sungui Arena; Attendance: 4,487; Referee: Woo Sang-il

29 October 36	Incheon	3 – 2	Pohang	Nam District, Incheon
15:00	Kim Dae-kyung 5'; Kevin 41'; Kim Yong-hwan (yellow card) 52'; Kim Do-hyuk (yellow card) 68'; Park Dae-han (yellow card) 82'; Lee Yun-pyo (yellow card) 90+5'; Kwon Wan-kyu 90+6'	Report	Lulinha 17'; Hwang Ji-soo (yellow card) 18'; Shin Kwang-Hoon (yellow card) 46' (yellow-red card) 75'; Lazar 63'; Yang Dong-hyun (yellow card) 90+6'	Stadium: Sungui Arena; Attendance: 4,851; Referee: Lee Dong-jun

2 November 37	Suwon	3 - 2	Incheon	Suwon, Gyeonggi Province
19:30	Jonjić 5' (o.g.); Kwon Chang-hoon 49'; Cho Dong-geon 59'; Lee Jung-soo (yellow card) 65'; Lee Jong-sung (yellow card) 83'; Yang Hyung-mo (yellow card) 90+3'	Report	Kevin (yellow card) 16'; Jin Sung-wook (yellow card) 17' (goal) 46', 85'	Stadium: Big Bird; Attendance: 4,042; Referee: Kim Sung-ho

5 November 38	Incheon	1 – 0	Suwon FC	Nam District, Incheon
15:00	Cho Byung-Kuk (yellow card) 45+2'; Lee Tae-hee (yellow card) 59'; Kim Yong-hwan 75'	Report	Bruce (yellow card) 45+2'; Kim Jong-gook (yellow card) 78'; Hwang Jae-hun (yellow card) 83'	Stadium: Sungui Arena; Attendance: 7,680; Referee: Kim Woo-seong

==== League table ====
Pos	Team	Pld	W	D	L	GF	GA	GD	Pts	Qualification or relegation
9	Pohang Steelers	38	12	10	16	43	46	−3	46	
10	Incheon United	38	11	12	15	43	51	−8	45	
11	Seongnam FC (R)	38	11	10	17	47	51	−4	43	Qualification for relegation play-offs

Source: K League
Rules for classification: 1) Points; 2) Goals scored; 3) Goal difference; 4) Wins; 5) Head-to-head points
(R) Relegated

==== Results summary ====
Overall								Home						Away					
Pld	W	D	L	GF	GA	GD	Pts	W	D	L	GF	GA	GD	W	D	L	GF	GA	GD
0	0	0	0	0	0	0	0	0	0	0	0	0	0	0	0	0	0	0	0

==== Results by round ====
Round	1	2	3	4	5	6	7	8	9	10	11	12	13	14	15	16	17	18	19	20	21	22	23	24	25	26	27	28	29	30	31	32	33	34	35	36	37	38
Ground	A	H	A	H	A	H	A	H	H	A	H	A	A	H	H	A	H	H	A	H	A	A	H	A	A	H	H	A	H	H	A	H	A	A	H	H	A	H
Result	L	L	L	L	D	D	D	L	D	L	L	W	D	W	D	L	W	W	D	L	W	L	D	D	L	L	L	L	W	D	W	D	W	D	W	W	L	W
Position	9	12	12	12	12	12	12	12	12	12	12	12	12	11	11	11	11	10	10	11	11	11	11	11	11	11	11	12	12	12	11	11	11	11	11	11	11	10

Updated to match(es) played on 29 September 2016. Source: League Fixtures and Results
A = Away; H = Home; W = Win; D = Draw; L = Loss

=== Korean FA Cup ===
11 May Round of 32	Incheon	1 – 0	Cheongju City	Nam District, Incheon
19:00	Kim Do-hyuk (yellow card) 30'; Park Dae-han (yellow card) 43' (yellow-red card) 71'; Kim Dong-suk 49' (yellow card) 58'; Song Si-woo (yellow card) 90'	Report	Song Min-kyu (yellow card) 23'	Stadium: Sungui Arena; Attendance: 824

22 June Round of 16	Incheon	3 – 2 (a.e.t.)	Daejeon	Nam District, Incheon
19:30	Kim Dae-joong 26'; Kevin 69' (red card) 87'; Kim Do-hyuk 99'	Report	Oh Chang-hyun (yellow card) 65'; Seo Dong-hyeon 73'; Wanderson 90'; Jean-Claude (yellow card) 90'; Silva (yellow card) 90'; Hwang In-beom (yellow card) 104'; Jin Dae-sung (yellow card) 105'	Stadium: Sungui Arena; Attendance: 1,173
