= 2014 Incheon United FC season =

Incheon United F.C.
2014 season
- Chairman: Song Young-gil
- Manager: Kim Bong-Gil
- K League Classic: 12th
- Korean FA Cup: Round of 32
- Top goalscorer: League: Ivo (7 goals); All: Ivo (7 goals)
- Highest home attendance: 11,238 vs Jeonbuk (15 March)
- Lowest home attendance: 2,025 vs Gyeongnam (2 November)
- Average home league attendance: 4536 league only
Home colours	Away colours

The 2014 season was Incheon United's tenth season in the K-League in South Korea. Incheon United competed in the K-League and the Korean FA Cup.

== Current squad ==
Note: Flags indicate national team as defined under FIFA eligibility rules; some limited exceptions apply. Players may hold more than one non-FIFA nationality.

No.	Pos.	Nation	Player
1	GK	KOR	Kwon Jung-hyuk
2	DF	KOR	Yong Hyun-jin
3	DF	KOR	Lee Sang-hee
4	MF	KOR	Bae Seung-jin
5	DF	KOR	Kim Jin-hwan
6	MF	KOR	Moon Sang-yoon
7	MF	BRA	Ivo
8	MF	KOR	Koo Bon-sang (vice-captain)
9	FW	KOR	Seol Ki-hyeon
10	FW	KOR	Lee Chun-soo
13	DF	KOR	Park Tae-min (captain)
14	MF	KOR	Lee Seok-hyun
16	DF	KOR	Lee Yun-pyo
17	DF	KOR	Kim Yong-chan
18	GK	KOR	Jo Su-hyuk
19	FW	BRA	Diogo (on loan from São Bernardo)
20	DF	KOR	An Jae-jun

No.	Pos.	Nation	Player
21	MF	KOR	Kim Do-hyuk
22	FW	KOR	Kwon Hyuk-jin
23	FW	KOR	Nam Joon-jae
24	DF	KOR	Lim Ha-ram
25	DF	KOR	Choi Jong-hoan
26	DF	KOR	Kim Yong-hwan
27	MF	KOR	Kim Bong-jin
28	FW	KOR	Lee Hyo-kyun
29	FW	KOR	Jin Sung-wook
30	MF	KOR	Yun Sang-ho
31	GK	KOR	Yoon Pyung-guk
32	DF	KOR	Jung Hae-gwon
33	MF	KOR	Cho Soo-chul
34	DF	KOR	Kim Sung-Eun
35	GK	KOR	Lee Tae-hee
36	FW	KOR	Kim Tae-jun

=== Out on loan ===
Note: Flags indicate national team as defined under FIFA eligibility rules; some limited exceptions apply. Players may hold more than one non-FIFA nationality.

No.	Pos.	Nation	Player
—	GK	KOR	Yoo Hyun (to Police for military service)
—	DF	KOR	Kim Kyung-min (to Sangju Sangmu for military service)
—	MF	KOR	Kim Jae-woong (to Anyang)

No.	Pos.	Nation	Player
—	DF	KOR	Kim Chang-hoon (to Sangju Sangmu for military service)
—	DF	KOR	Kim Dae-joong (to Daejeon Citizen)
—	FW	BRA	João Paulo (to ABC)

== Transfers ==
=== In ===
#	Name	POS	Moving from	Mode	Window	Period	Fee	Notes
11	(Montenegro) Stefan Nikolić	FW	(Romania) Steaua București	Transfer	Winter		Free	
7	(Brazil) Ivo	MF	(Brazil) Circiúma	Transfer	Winter			
3	(South Korea) Lee Sang-hee	DF	(South Korea) Sangju Sangmu	Transfer	Winter			
5	(South Korea) Kim Jin-hwan	DF	(South Korea) Gangwon	Transfer	Winter			
27	(South Korea) Kim Bong-jin	MF	(South Korea) Gangwon	Transfer	Winter		Free	
2	(South Korea) Yong Hyun-jin	DF	(South Korea) Sangju Sangmu	Transfer	Winter			
17	(South Korea) Kim Yong-chan	DF	(South Korea) Gyeongnam	Transfer	Winter		Free	
19	(Brazil) João Paulo	FW	(South Korea) Gwangju	Transfer	Winter			
4	(South Korea) Bae Seung-jin	MF	(Japan) Yokohama FC	Transfer	Winter		Free	
24	(South Korea) Lim Ha-ram	DF	(South Korea) Gwangju	Transfer	Winter			
33	(South Korea) Cho Soo-chul	MF	(South Korea) Seongnam	Transfer	Winter		Free	
	(South Korea) Kim Myung-woon	MF	(South Korea) Sangju Sangmu	End of military service loan	Winter		N/A	
	(Australia) Nathan Burns	MF	(Australia) Newcastle Jets	End of loan	Winter		N/A	
	(South Korea) Hong Sun-man	DF	(South Korea) Cheonan	End of loan	Winter		N/A	
	(South Korea) Cho Kyum-son	DF	(South Korea) Goyang Hi	End of loan	Winter		N/A	
	(South Korea) Kim Kyung-min	DF	(South Korea) Bucheon 1995	End of loan	Winter		N/A	
22	(South Korea) Kwon Hyuk-jin	FW	(South Korea) Police	End of loan	Winter		N/A	
21	(South Korea) Kim Do-hyuk	MF	(South Korea) Yonsei		Winter			
15	(South Korea) Kim Dae-joong	DF	(South Korea) Hongik		Winter			
30	(South Korea) Yun Sang-ho	MF	(South Korea) Honam		Winter			
36	(South Korea) Kim Tae-jun	FW	(South Korea) Honam		Winter			
26	(South Korea) Kim Yong-hwan	DF	(South Korea) Soongsil		Winter			
32	(South Korea) Jung Hae-gwon	DF	(South Korea) Chodang		Winter			
34	(South Korea) Kim Sung-eun	DF	(South Korea) Sun Moon		Winter			
35	(South Korea) Lee Tae-hee	GK	Academy	Promotion	Winter		Free	
19	(Brazil) Diogo da Silva Farias	FW	(Brazil) São Bernardo	Loan	Summer			

=== Out ===
#	Name	POS	Moving to	Mode	Window	Period	Fee	Notes
6	(South Korea) Son Dae-ho	MF	(China) Hangzhou Greentown	End of contract	Winter		Free	
5	(South Korea) Kim Nam-il	MF	(South Korea) Jeonbuk Hyundai Motors	End of contract	Winter		Free	
36	(South Korea) Cho Kyum-son	DF	(Philippines) Ceres	End of contract	Winter		Free	
27	(South Korea) Han Kyo-won	FW	(South Korea) Jeonbuk Hyundai Motors	End of contract	Winter		Free	
4	(South Korea) Kim Tae-yoon	DF	Free agent	End of contract	Winter			
22	(South Korea) Yoo Jae-ho	DF	(South Korea) Gimpo Citizen	End of contract	Winter		Free	
3	(South Korea) Jeon Jun-heong	DF	(South Korea) Gwangju	End of contract	Winter		Free	
35	(South Korea) Kang Young-yeon	DF	(South Korea) Gangneung City	End of contract	Winter		Free	
26	(South Korea) Jeon Hyung-sup	DF	Free agent	End of contract	Winter			
	(South Korea) Hong Sun-man	DF	(South Korea) Mokpo City	Transfer	Winter			
11	(Brazil) Thiago	FW	(Brazil) Ferroviára		Winter			
8	(South Korea) Kim Jae-woong	FW	(South Korea) Anyang	Loan	Winter			
	(South Korea) Kim Kyung-min	DF	(South Korea) Sangju Sangmu	Military service loan	Winter			
14	(South Korea) Kim Chang-hoon	DF	(South Korea) Sangju Sangmu	Military service loan	Winter			
19	(Brazil) Diogo da Silva Farias	FW	(Brazil) São Bernardo	Contract terminated	Winter		Free	
37	(South Korea) Kang Yong	DF	(South Korea) Daegu	Contract terminated	Winter		Free	
32	(South Korea) Kim Joo-bin	DF	(South Korea) Daegu	Contract terminated	Winter		Free	
18	(South Korea) Han Jae-woong	FW	Free agent	Contract terminated	Winter			
	(South Korea) Kim Myung-woon	FW	Free agent	Contract terminated	Winter			
31	(South Korea) Kim Kyo-bin	GK	Free agent	Contract terminated	Winter			
11	(Montenegro) Stefan Nikolić	FW	(Malaysia) Kelantan FA	Contract terminated	Summer		Free	
19	(Brazil) João Paulo	FW	(Brazil) ABC	Loan	Summer			
	(Australia) Nathan Burns	MF	(Australia) Wellington Phoenix		Summer			
15	(South Korea) Kim Dae-joong	DF	(South Korea) Daejeon Citizen FC	Loan	Summer			

== Coaching staff ==
=== Senior coaching staff ===
Position	Name
Manager	(South Korea) Kim Bong-gil
Assistant manager	(South Korea) Yoo Dongwoo
Team Manager	(South Korea) Choi Youngsang
Coach	(South Korea) Kim Hyunsoo (South Korea) Myung Jinyoung
Goalkeeper coach	(South Korea) Lee Yong-bal
Physical Coach	(Brazil) Wanderley
Scout	(South Korea) Shin Jin-won
Trainer	(South Korea) Lee Seungjae (South Korea) Lee Dongwon (South Korea) Yang Seungmin
Translator	(South Korea) Chun Jihun

=== Youth coaching staff ===
Position	Name
U-18 Head Coach	(South Korea) Shin Sung-hwan
U-18 Goalkeeper Coach	(South Korea) Kim Lee-sub
U-15 Head Coach	(South Korea) Woo Sung-yong
U-15 Goalkeeper Coach	(South Korea) Yoon Jin-ho
U-15 Coach	(South Korea) Lee Sung-gyu
U-12 Head Coach	(South Korea) Kim Tae-jong
U-12 Coach	(South Korea) Choi Jae-young

== Match results ==
=== K League Classic ===
All times are Korea Standard Time (KST) – UTC+9

Date Round	Home	Score	Away	Location

9 March 1	Sangju	2 – 2	Incheon	Sangju, North Gyeongsang Province
14:00	Lee Jung-hyup 78'; Lee Ho 86'	Report	Nam Joon-jae 76'; Lee Hyo-kyun 88'	Stadium: Sangju Civic Stadium; Attendance: 6,469; Referee: Ryu Heesun

15 March 2	Incheon	0 – 1	Jeonbuk	Nam District, Incheon
14:00	Koo Bon-sang (yellow card) 15'; Lee Chun-soo (yellow card) 31'	Report	Lee Seung-ryul (yellow card) 37'; Jeong Hyuk 74'	Stadium: Sungui Arena; Attendance: 11,238; Referee: Lee Min-hu

23 March 3	Ulsan	3 – 0	Incheon	Nam District, Ulsan
14:00	Kim Shin-wook 5'; Ko Chang-hyun (yellow card) 14'; Han Sang-woon 20'; Rafinha 59'; Kim Chi-gon (yellow card) 71'	Report	Choi Jong-hoan (red card) 20'; Bae Seung-jin (yellow card) 34'	Stadium: Big Crown; Attendance: 9,576; Referee: Kim Dongjin

26 March 4	Gyeongnam	1 – 0	Incheon	Changwon, South Gyeongsang Province
19:00	Kwon Wan-kyu 27' (yellow card) 51'; Sretenović (yellow card) 81'	Report	Bae Seung-jin (yellow card) 76'	Stadium: Changwon Football Center; Attendance: 2,765; Referee: Ko Hyung-jin

30 March 5	Incheon	0 – 0	Chunnam	Nam District, Incheon
14:00		Report	Kim Dong-chul (yellow card) 22'; Lee Seung-hee (yellow card) 90'	Stadium: Sungui Arena; Attendance: 4,376; Referee: Yoo Sunho

5 April 6	Seongnam	0 – 0	Incheon	Seongnam, Gyeonggi Province
16:00		Report	Jin Sung-wook (yellow card) 90'	Stadium: Tancheon Sports Complex; Attendance: 3,722; Referee: Kim Sungho

9 April 7	Incheon	0 – 0	Busan	Nam District, Incheon
19:30	An Jae-jun (yellow card) 88'	Report		Stadium: Sungui Arena; Attendance: 2,297; Referee: Ryu Heesun

13 April 8	Incheon	0 – 3	Suwon	Nam District, Incheon
16:00	Lee Hyo-kyun (yellow card) 51'	Report	Kim Eun-sun 13'; Hong Chul (yellow card) 35'; Jong Tae-se 51'; Santos 77'	Stadium: Sungui Arena; Attendance: 6,406; Referee: Choi Myung'yong

20 April 9	Jeju	1 – 0	Incheon	Seogwipo, Jeju Province
16:00	Droguett 31'; Yoon Bitgaram (yellow card) 51'; Kim Hyun (yellow card) 55'; Jang Eun-kyu (yellow card) 60'	Report	Koo Bon-sang (yellow card) 13'; Yong Hyun-jin (yellow card) 21'; Lee Hyo-kyun (yellow card) 46'	Stadium: Wind Force; Attendance: 3,297; Referee: Kim Dongjin

27 April 10	Pohang	3 – 0	Incheon	Pohang, North Gyeongsang Province
14:00	Shin Kwang-hoon 17'; Park Hee-chul (yellow card) 77'; Kim Gwang-seok 86'; Kim Dae-ho (yellow card) 90'; Lee Myung-joo 90+5'	Report	Bae Seung-jin (yellow card) 14'; An Jae-jun (yellow card) 57'; Yong Hyun-jin (yellow card) 59'; Lee Chun-soo (yellow card) 81'	Stadium: Steel Yard; Attendance: 7,166; Referee: Woo Sang'il

3 May 11	Incheon	1 – 0	Seoul	Nam District, Incheon
16:00	Yong Hyun-jin (yellow card) 27'; Ivo 47'; Moon Sang-yun (yellow card) 50' (yellow-red card) 63'; Kwon Hyuk-jin (yellow card) 73'; An Jae-jun (yellow card) 84'; Koo Bon-sang (yellow card) 90'	Report		Stadium: Sungui Arena; Attendance: 7,723; Referee: Yoo Sunho

10 May 12	Jeonbuk	1 – 1	Incheon	Jeonju, North Jeolla Province
14:00	Lee Dong-gook 47'	Report	Lee Chun-soo (yellow card) 19'; Lim Ha-ram (yellow card) 60'; Kim Do-hyuk (yellow card) 69'; Cho Soo-chul 90+3'	Stadium: Jeonju Castle; Attendance: 9,985; Referee: Kim Sangwoo

6 July 13	Incheon	1 – 2	Sangju	Nam District, Incheon
19:00	Ivo (yellow card) 50' (goal) 82'	Report	Kim Ho (yellow card) 36'; Ha Tae-goon 54' (pen.), 89'	Stadium: Sungui Arena; Attendance: 4,446; Referee: Kim Sangwoo

9 July 14	Incheon	1 – 1	Seongnam	Nam District, Incheon
18:30	Lee Hyo-kyun 50'	Report	Lee Jong-won (yellow card) 32'; Lee Chang-hoon (yellow card) 34'; Lim Chae-min (yellow card) 63'; Hwang Ui-jo 69'; Jung Sun-ho (yellow card) 76'	Stadium: Sungui Arena; Attendance: 2,353; Referee: Yoo Sunho

13 July 15	Busan	2 – 2	Incheon	Yeonje District, Busan
19:30	Hong Dong-hyun (yellow card) 45'; Fágner 52', 79'	Report	Kim Do-hyuk (yellow card) 9'; Moon Sang-yun 67'; Ivo 88'	Stadium: Busan Asiad Main Stadium; Attendance: 3,827; Referee: Kim Sungho

19 July 16	Suwon	3 – 2	Incheon	Suwon, Gyeonggi Province
19:00	Ko Cha-won 19'; Seo Jung-jin 38'; Santos 42'; Kim Eun-sun (yellow card) 52'; Cho Ji-hun (yellow card) 85'	Report	Park Tae-min (yellow card) 53'; Lee Hyo-kyun 62'; Moon Sang-yun 71'	Stadium: Big Bird; Attendance: 23,835; Referee: Lee Dongjun

23 July 17	Incheon	0 – 0	Pohang	Nam District, Incheon
19:30	Lee Hyo-kyun (yellow card) 46'	Report	Son Joon-ho (yellow card) 19'; Shin Hwa-yong (yellow card) 77'	Stadium: Sungui Arena; Attendance: 4,697; Referee: Woo Sang'il

2 August 18	Incheon	2 – 0	Ulsan	Nam District, Incheon
19:00	Kim Do-hyuk (yellow card) 29'; Jin Sung-wook 59'; Choi Jong-hoan 72'	Report	Kim Sung-hwan (yellow card) 25'; Kim Young-sam (yellow card) 38'; Lee Yong (yellow card) 88'; Kim Shin-wook (yellow card)	Stadium: Sungui Arena; Attendance: 4,730; Referee: Kim Dongjin

6 August 19	Chunnam	1 – 2	Incheon	Gwangyang, South Jeolla Province
19:00	Leandrinho 40'; Cornthwaite (yellow card) 74'; Kim Tae-ho (yellow card)	Report	Jin Sung-wook 66'; Kim Yong-hwan (yellow card) 70'; Park Tae-min 78'	Stadium: Dragon Dungeon; Attendance: 3,507; Referee: Yoo Sunho

10 August 20	Incheon	2 – 0	Gyeongnam	Nam District, Incheon
19:00	Jin Sung-wook 54'; Ivo 90+4' (pen.)	Report	DeVere (yellow card) 41'	Stadium: Sungui Arena; Attendance: 2,907; Referee: Choi Myung'yong

16 August 21	Seoul	5 – 1	Incheon	Mapo District, Seoul
19:00	Yun Il-lok 30'; Ko Yo-han 37'; Kim Chi-woo 43'; Molina 77'; Lee Sang-hyeob 82'	Report	Kim Do-hyuk (yellow card) 35'; Yong Hyun-jin (yellow card) 46'; Jin Sung-wook 90+3'	Stadium: Sangam; Attendance: 24,027; Referee: Kim Jong-hyuk

24 August 22	Incheon	0 – 0	Jeju	Nam District, Incheon
19:00	Lee Chun-soo (yellow card) 49'; Lee Yun-pyo (yellow card) 57'	Report		Stadium: Sungui Arena; Attendance: 5,636; Referee: Kim Sungho

30 August 23	Incheon	3 – 0	Busan	Nam District, Incheon
19:00	Koo Bon-sang (yellow card) 5'; Ivo 22' (pen.), 40'; Kim Do-hyuk 73'	Report	Hong Dong-hyun (yellow card) 29'; Jacio (yellow card) 75'	Stadium: Sungui Arena; Attendance: 7,251; Referee: Ko Hyung-jin

6 September 24	Seongnam	2 – 0	Incheon	Seongnam, Gyeonggi Province
17:00	Hwang Ui-jo 22'; Kim Dong-hee 47'; Lee Yo-han (yellow card) 84'	Report	Yong Hyun-jin (yellow card) 52'; Lee Chun-soo (yellow card) 77'	Stadium: Tancheon Sports Complex; Attendance: 2,364; Referee: Yoo Sunho

10 September 25	Gyeongnam	0 – 0	Incheon	Changwon, South Gyeongsang Province
19:30	Junuzović (yellow card) 8'	Report	Lee Yun-pyo (yellow card) 34'	Stadium: Changwon Football Center; Attendance: 1,554; Referee: Woo Sang'il

13 September 26	Seoul	3 – 1	Incheon	Mapo District, Seoul
19:00	Yun Ju-tae 27'; Choi Jung-han 41' (yellow card) 42'; Kim Jin-kyu 51' (pen.); Kim Ju-young (yellow card) 60'; Choi Hyo-jin (yellow card) 67'	Report	Lee Chun-soo (red card) 69'; Lee Hyo-kyun 90'	Stadium: Sangam; Attendance: 17,337; Referee: Lee Dongjun

20 September 27	Ulsan	1 – 1	Incheon	Nam District, Ulsan
14:00	Baek Ji-hoon 57'; Ha Sung-min (yellow card) 75'	Report	Yong Hyun-jin (yellow card) 10'; Nam Joon-jae 24'; Ivo (yellow card) 75'	Stadium: Big Crown; Attendance: 2,779; Referee: Lee Min-hu

27 September 28	Jeju	0 – 2	Incheon	Seogwipo, Jeju Province
14:00	Jovanović (yellow card) 22'; Kim Hyun (yellow card) 51'; Hwang Il-soo (yellow card) 90'	Report	Nam Joon-jae 8'; Choi Jong-hoan 66'	Stadium: Wind Force; Attendance: 3,134; Referee: Choi Myung'yong

1 October 29	Suwon	1 – 1	Incheon	Suwon, Gyeonggi Province
19:30	Oh Beom-seok (yellow card) 29'; Santos 54'	Report	Diogo (yellow card) 44'; Choi Jong-hoan 60'	Stadium: Big Bird; Attendance: 12,237; Referee: Kim Sungho

5 October 30	Incheon	1 – 0	Sangju	Nam District, Incheon
16:00	Ivo 65' (pen.); Park Tae-min (yellow card) 90'	Report	Yang Joon-a (yellow card) 49'; Hong Jeong-nam (yellow card) 62'; Lee Yong-gi (yellow card) 75'	Stadium: Sungui Arena; Attendance: 2,720; Referee: Woo Sang'il

11 October 31	Incheon	2 – 1	Pohang	Nam District, Incheon
14:00	Lee Chun-soo 3'; An Jae-jun (yellow card) 7'; Jin Sung-wook 82' (yellow card) 90'	Report	Ko Mu-yeol 9'; Shin Kwang-hoon (yellow card) 79'; Kim Jun-su (yellow card)	Stadium: Sungui Arena; Attendance: 4,176; Referee: Kim Dongjin

18 October 32	Incheon	0 – 2	Jeonbuk	Nam District, Incheon
14:00	An Jae-jun (yellow card); Kim Do-hyuk (yellow card) 18'; Lee Hyo-kyun (yellow card) 31'; Koo Bon-sang (yellow card) 84'	Report	Han Kyo-won 37'; Lee Seung-gi 39'	Stadium: Sungui Arena; Attendance: 4,784; Referee: Kim Sungho

26 October 33	Incheon	3 – 3	Chunnam	Nam District, Incheon
14:00	Diogo da Silva Farias 2'; Kim Do-hyuk (yellow card) 34'; Moon Sang-yun 69'; Jin Sung-wook 80'	Report	An Yong-woo 16'; Hong Jin-gi (yellow card) 37'; Lee Seung-hee (yellow card) 44'; Cornthwaite 88', 90+5'	Stadium: Sungui Arena; Attendance: 4,110; Referee: Ko Hyung-jin

2 November 34	Incheon	1 – 1	Gyeongnam	Nam District, Incheon
16:00	Park Tae-min (yellow card) 24'; Lee Seok-hyun 38'; Koo Bon-sang (yellow card) 49'	Report	Stojanović 49'	Stadium: Sungui Arena; Attendance: 2,025; Referee: Song Minseok

8 November 35	Busan	1 – 0	Incheon	Yeonje District, Busan
14:00	Ju Se-jong 76'	Report		Stadium: Busan Asiad Main Stadium; Attendance: 3,012; Referee: Lee Min-hu

15 November 36	Incheon	1 – 1	Sangju	Nam District, Incheon
14:00	Kim Do-hyuk 8'	Report	Lee Hoo-kwon (yellow card) 34'; Yang Joon-a (yellow card) 43' (goal) 66' (pen.); Seo Sang-min (yellow card); Park Kyung-ik (yellow card) 81'; Kwak Kwang-seon (yellow card) 83'	Stadium: Sungui Arena; Attendance: 2,086; Referee: Kim Sungho

26 November 37	Incheon	0 – 1	Seongnam	Nam District, Incheon
19:30	Park Tae-min (yellow card) 15'; Choi Jong-hoan (yellow card) 41'; Jin Sung-wook (yellow card) 60'	Report	Kim Dong-sub 45'; Park Jun-hyuk (yellow card) 45'; Lim Chae-min (yellow card) 48'; Kim Pyung-rae (yellow card) 71'; Park Jin-po (yellow card) 90'	Stadium: Sungui Arena; Attendance: 2,224; Referee: Yoo Sunho

29 November 38	Chunnam	0 – 0	Incheon	Gwangyang, South Jeolla Province
14:00	Leandrinho (yellow card) 31'	Report		Stadium: Dragon Dungeon; Attendance: 1,568; Referee: Ko Hyung-jin

==== League table ====
Pos	Team	Pld	W	D	L	GF	GA	GD	Pts	Qualification or relegation
8	Busan IPark	38	10	13	15	37	49	−12	43	
9	Seongnam FC	38	9	13	16	32	39	−7	40	Qualification for Champions League group stage (Note: Qualified as champions of FA Cup.)
10	Incheon United	38	8	16	14	33	46	−13	40	
11	Gyeongnam FC (R)	38	7	15	16	30	52	−22	36	Qualification for relegation play-offs
12	Sangju Sangmu (R)	38	7	13	18	39	62	−23	34	Relegation to K League Challenge

Source: RSSSF
Rules for classification: 1) Points; 2) Goal difference; 3) Goals scored
(R) Relegated

==== Results summary ====
Overall								Home						Away					
Pld	W	D	L	GF	GA	GD	Pts	W	D	L	GF	GA	GD	W	D	L	GF	GA	GD
4	0	1	3	2	7	−5	1	0	0	1	0	1	−1	0	1	2	2	6	−4

==== Results by round ====
Round	1	2	3	4	5	6	7	8	9	10	11	12	13	14	15	16	17	18	19	20	21	22	23	24	25	26	27	28	29	30	31	32	33	34	35	36	37	38
Ground	A	H	A	A	H	A	H	H	A	A	H	A	H	H	A	A	H	H	A	H	A	H																
Result	D	L	L	L	D	D	D	L	L	L	W	D	L	D	D	L	D	W	W	W	L	D																
Position	6	9	12	12	12	12	12	12	12	12	12	12	12	12	12	12	12	11	10	9	9	8																

Updated to match(es) played on 25 August 2014. Source: League Fixtures and Results
A = Away; H = Home; W = Win; D = Draw; L = Loss

=== Korean FA Cup ===
30 April	FC Seoul	3 – 2 (a.e.t.)	Incheon United	Seoul World Cup Stadium, Seoul
19:30	Shim Je-hyeok 1'; Ko Kwang-min 46'; Lee Woong-hee 109'		João Paulo 40'; Lee Seok-hyun 65'	Attendance: 3,115

== Squad statistics ==
=== Appearances ===
Statistics accurate as of match played 29 August 2014

No.	Nat.	Pos.	Name	League		FA Cup		Appearances		Goals
No.	Nat.	Pos.	Name	Apps	Goals	Apps	Goals	App (sub)	Total	Goals
1	(South Korea)	GK	Kwon Jung-hyuk	28	0	0	0	28 (0)	28	0
2	(South Korea)	DF	Yong Hyun-jin	23 (1)	0	0	0	23 (1)	14	0
3	(South Korea)	DF	Lee Sang-hee	0	0	0	0	0	0	0
4	(South Korea)	MF	Bae Seung-jin	10 (1)	0	0	0	10 (1)	11	0
5	(South Korea)	DF	Kim Jin-hwan	1 (1)	0	0	0	1 (1)	2	0
6	(South Korea)	MF	Moon Sang-yoon	18 (13)	3	0	0	18 (13)	31	3
7	(Brazil)	MF	Ivo	26 (7)	7	0	0	26 (7)	33	7
8	(South Korea)	MF	Koo Bon-sang	32 (1)	0	0	0	32 (1)	33	0
9	(South Korea)	FW	Seol Ki-hyeon	6 (1)	0	0	0	6 (1)	7	0
10	(South Korea)	FW	Lee Chun-soo	27 (1)	1	0	0	27 (1)	28	1
13	(South Korea)	DF	Park Tae-min	36	1	0	0	36 (0)	36	1
14	(South Korea)	MF	Lee Seok-hyun	14 (11)	1	0	1	14 (11)	25	2
16	(South Korea)	DF	Lee Yun-pyo	37	0	0	0	37 (0)	37	0
17	(South Korea)	DF	Kim Yong-chan	0	0	0	0	0	0	0
18	(South Korea)	GK	Jo Su-huk	0	0	0	0	0	0	0
19	(Brazil)	FW	Diogo	11	1	0	0	11 (0)	1	0
20	(South Korea)	DF	An Jae-jun	36	0	0	0	36 (0)	36	0
21	(South Korea)	MF	Kim Do-hyuk	24 (2)	2	0	0	24 (2)	26	2
22	(South Korea)	FW	Kwon Hyuk-jin	0 (6)	0	0	0	0 (6)	6	0
23	(South Korea)	FW	Nam Joon-jae	14 (3)	3	0	0	14 (3)	17	3
24	(South Korea)	DF	Lim Ha-ram	4 (8)	0	0	0	4 (8)	12	0
25	(South Korea)	DF	Choi Jong-hoan	20 (10)	3	0	0	20 (10)	30	3
26	(South Korea)	DF	Kim Yong-hwan	12 (2)	0	0	0	12 (2)	14	0
27	(South Korea)	MF	Kim Bong-jin	0	0	0	0	0	0	0
28	(South Korea)	FW	Lee Hyo-kyun	17 (12)	4	0	0	17 (12)	29	4
29	(South Korea)	FW	Jin Sung-wook	4 (22)	6	0	0	4 (22)	26	6
30	(South Korea)	MF	Yun Sang-ho	0	0	0	0	0	0	0
31	(South Korea)	GK	Yoon Pyung-guk	0	0	0	0	0	0	0
32	(South Korea)	DF	Jung Hae-gwon	0	0	0	0	0	0	0
33	(South Korea)	MF	Cho Soo-chul	3 (3)	1	0	0	3 (3)	6	1
34	(South Korea)	DF	Kim Sung-eun	0	0	0	0	0	0	0
35	(South Korea)	GK	Lee Tae-hee	0	0	0	0	0	0	0
36	(South Korea)	FW	Kim Tae-jun	0	0	0	0	0	0	0
53	(South Korea)	GK	Yoo Hyun	10	0	0	0	10 (0)	10	0
11	(Montenegro)	FW	Stefan Nikolić	4 (3)	0	0	0	4 (3)	7	0
15	(South Korea)	DF	Kim Dae-joong	0	0	0	0	0	0	0
19	(Brazil)	FW	João Paulo	1 (4)	0	0	0	1 (4)	5	0

=== Goals ===
No.	Nation	Position	Name	K-League	KFA Cup	Total
7	(Brazil)	MF	Ivo	7	0	7
29	(South Korea)	FW	Jin Sung-wook	6	0	6
28	(South Korea)	FW	Lee Hyo-kyun	4	0	4
6	(South Korea)	MF	Moon Sang-yoon	3	0	3
23	(South Korea)	FW	Nam Joon-jae	3	0	3
25	(South Korea)	DF	Choi Jong-hoan	3	0	3
21	(South Korea)	MF	Kim Do-hyuk	2	0	2
14	(South Korea)	MF	Lee Seok-hyun	1	1	2
19	(Brazil)	FW	Diogo	1	0	1
13	(South Korea)	DF	Park Tae-min	1	0	1
33	(South Korea)	MF	Cho Soo-chul	1	0	1
10	(South Korea)	FW	Lee Chun-soo	1	0	1
19	(Brazil)	FW	João Paulo	0	1	1
/	/	/	Own Goals	0	0	0
/	/	/	TOTALS	33	2	15

=== Assists ===
No.	Nation	Position	Name	K-League	KFA Cup	Total
7	(Brazil)	MF	Ivo	6	0	6
6	(South Korea)	MF	Moon Sang-yoon	3	0	3
10	(South Korea)	FW	Lee Chun-soo	3	0	3
8	(South Korea)	MF	Koo Bon-sang	3	0	3
28	(South Korea)	FW	Lee Hyo-kyun	2	0	2
21	(South Korea)	MF	Kim Do-hyuk	2	0	2
13	(South Korea)	DF	Park Tae-min	2	0	2
14	(South Korea)	MF	Lee Seok-hyun	1	0	1
25	(South Korea)	DF	Choi Jong-hoan	1	0	1
16	(South Korea)	DF	Lee Yun-pyo	1	0	1
/	/	/	TOTALS	24	0	24

=== Discipline ===
No.	Nation	Position	Name	K-League			KFA Cup			Total		
No.	Nation	Position	Name	Booked	(yellow card) (yellow-red card)	Sent off (straight red)	Booked	(yellow card) (yellow-red card)	Sent off (straight red)	Booked	(yellow card) (yellow-red card)	Sent off (straight red)
2	(South Korea)	DF	Yong Hyun-jin	7	0	0	0	0	0	7	0	0
4	(South Korea)	MF	Bae Seung-jin	3	0	0	0	0	0	3	0	0
6	(South Korea)	MF	Moon Sang-yoon	0	1	0	0	0	0	0	1	0
7	(Brazil)	MF	Ivo	2	0	0	0	0	0	2	0	0
8	(South Korea)	MF	Koo Bon-sang	6	0	0	0	0	0	6	0	0
10	(South Korea)	FW	Lee Chun-soo	5	1	0	0	0	0	5	1	0
13	(South Korea)	DF	Park Tae-min	4	0	0	0	0	0	4	0	0
16	(South Korea)	DF	Lee Yun-pyo	2	0	0	0	0	0	2	0	0
19	(Brazil)	FW	Diogo	1	0	0	0	0	0	1	0	0
20	(South Korea)	MF	An Jae-jun	5	0	0	0	0	0	5	0	0
21	(South Korea)	MF	Kim Do-hyuk	6	0	0	0	0	0	6	0	0
22	(South Korea)	FW	Kwon Hyuk-jin	1	0	0	0	0	0	1	0	0
24	(South Korea)	DF	Lim Ha-ram	1	0	0	0	0	0	1	0	0
25	(South Korea)	DF	Choi Jong-hoan	1	0	1	0	0	0	1	0	1
26	(South Korea)	DF	Kim Yong-hwan	1	0	0	0	0	0	1	0	0
28	(South Korea)	FW	Lee Hyo-kyun	4	0	0	0	0	0	4	0	0
29	(South Korea)	FW	Jin Sung-wook	3	0	0	0	0	0	3	0	0
/	/	/	TOTALS	52	2	1	0	0	0	52	2	1
