= Hwang Jae-hun =

Hwang Jae-hun may refer to:

- Hwang Jae-hun (footballer, born 1986)
- Hwang Jae-hun (footballer, born 1990)
