= Kim Jin-hwan =

Kim Jin-hwan may refer to:

- Kim Jin-hwan (footballer) (born 1989), South Korean footballer
- Kim Jin-hwan (singer) (born 1994), South Korean singer
