= Kim Dae-jung (disambiguation) =

Kim Dae-jung (Korean: 김대중) may refer to:

- Kim Dae-jung (1924–2009), South Korean president from 1998 to 2003
- Kim Dea-jung (born 1970), South Korean sledge hockey player
- Kim Dae-joong (footballer) (born 1992), South Korean footballer

== See also ==
- Kim Daejung Convention Center station
