= Jacio =

Brazilian footballer

Personal information
- Full name: Jacio Marcos de Jesus
- Date of birth: 30 July 1989 (age 37)
- Place of birth: São Paulo, Brazil
- Height: 1.78 m (5 ft 10 in)
- Position: Midfielder

Team information
- Current team: Penapolense

Senior career*
Years	Team	Apps	(Gls)
2008–2009	Assisense		
2010	José Bonifácio		
2012	Tupã		
2013	Operário Ferroviário	18	(0)
2013–2014	Tupã	14	(5)
2014	Busan IPark	6	(0)
2015	Tupã	9	(2)
2015	Paraná	1	(0)
2016	Capivariano		
2016	Tupã		
2016–	Penapolense		
- * Club domestic league appearances and goals as of 13 January 2017

Jacio Marcos de Jesus (born July 30, 1989) is a Brazilian footballer who plays for Penapolense as midfielder.

== Career statistics ==
As of 13 January 2017

Club	Season	League			State League		Cup		Conmebol		Other		Total	
Club	Season	Division	Apps	Goals	Apps	Goals	Apps	Goals	Apps	Goals	Apps	Goals	Apps	Goals
Assisense	2008	Paulista B	—		9	0	—		—		—		9	0
Assisense	2009	Paulista B	—		1	0	—		—		—		1	0
Assisense	Subtotal		0	0	10	0	0	0	0	0	0	0	10	0
José Bonifácio	2010	Paulista B	—		13	0	—		—		—		13	0
Tupã	2012	Paulista B	—		19	1	—		—		—		19	1
Operário Ferroviário	2013	Paranaense	—		18	0	—		—		—		18	0
Tupã	2014	Paulista A3	—		14	5	—		—		—		14	5
Busan IPark	2014	K League	6	0	—		1	0	—		—		7	0
Tupã	2015	Paulista A3	—		9	2	—		—		—		9	2
Paraná	2015	Série B	1	0	—		—		—		—		1	0
Capivariano	2016	Paulista	—		12	1	—		—		—		12	1
Penapolense	2016	Paulista A2	—		—		—		—		4 (Note: All appearance(s) in Copa Paulista)	0	4	0
Career total			7	0	95	9	1	0	0	0	4	0	107	9
