= Tupã Futebol Clube =

Brazilian football club

Tupã
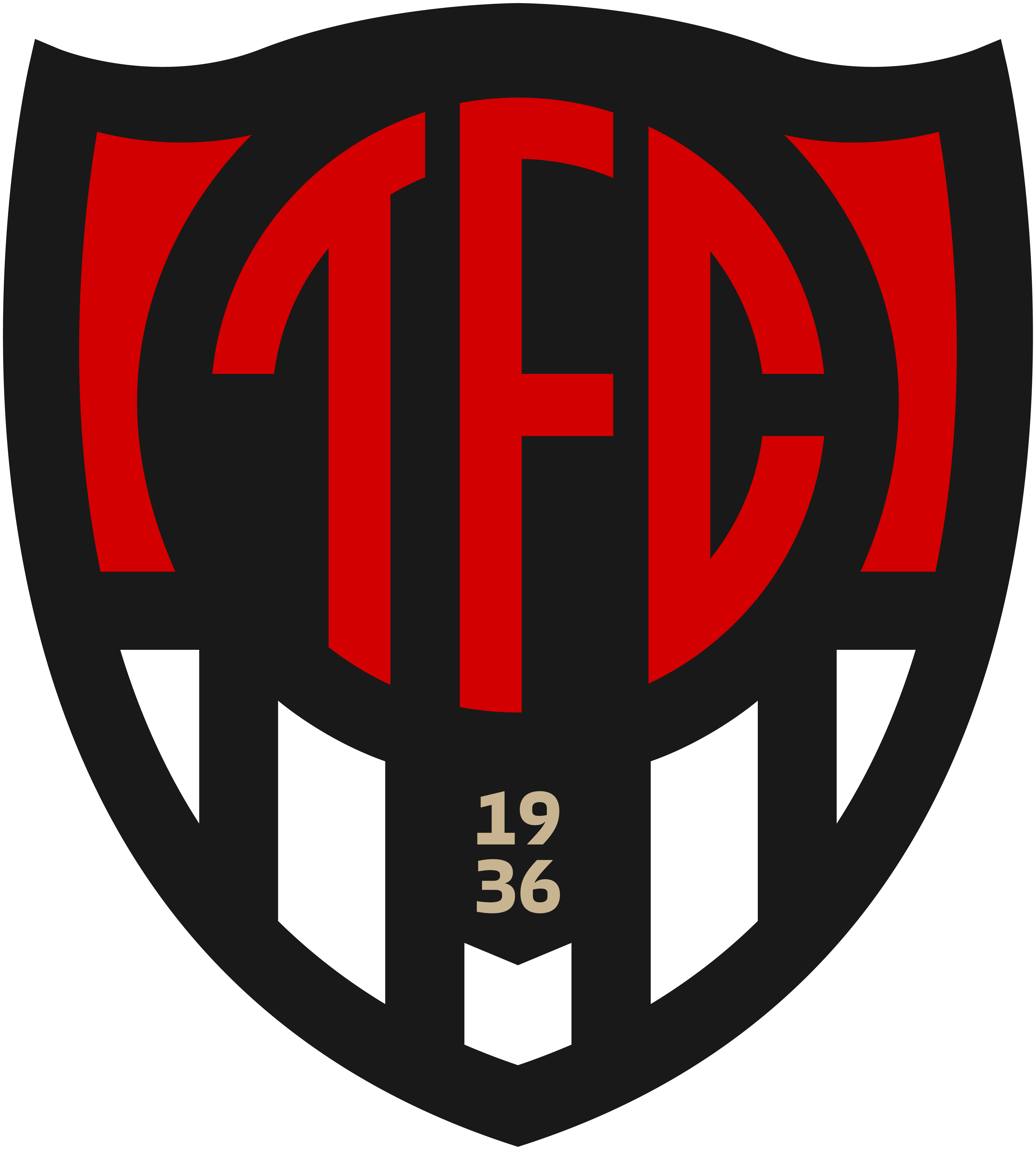
- Full name: Tupã Futebol Clube
- Nicknames: Tricolor da Alta Paulista; Majestade
- Founded: 8 February 1936; 90 years ago
- Ground: Estádio Alonso Carvalho Braga
- Capacity: 5,515
- League: Campeonato Paulista Segunda Divisão
- 2025: Paulista Segunda Divisão, 10th of 15
- Website: http://tupafc.com/
Home colours	Away colours

Tupã Futebol Clube, or simply Tupã, is a Brazilian football team based in Tupã, São Paulo. Founded in 1936, it plays in Campeonato Paulista Segunda Divisão.

== History ==
The club was founded on 4 August 1936, professionalized its football department in 1945 and played its first professional competition, which was the Campeonato Paulista Série A2, in that year.

== Stadium ==
Tupã Futebol Clube play their home games at Estádio Alonso de Carvalho Braga. The stadium has a maximum capacity of 5,515 people.

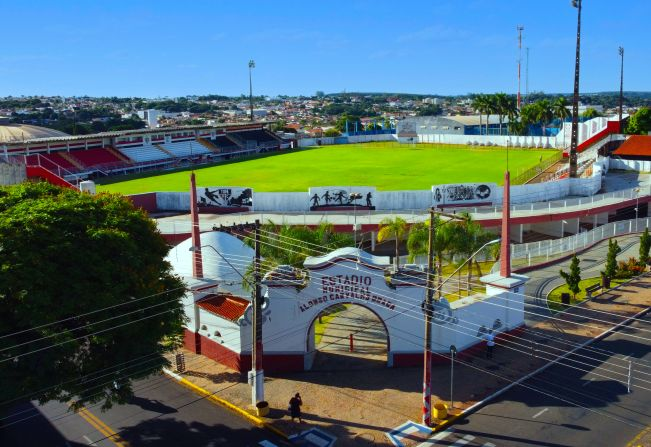
Estádio Alonso de Carvalho Braga
