= Song Si-woo =

South Korean footballer (born 1993)

Personal information
- Full name: Song Si-woo
- Date of birth: 28 August 1993 (age 33)
- Place of birth: South Korea
- Height: 1.73 m (5 ft 8 in)
- Position: Midfielder

Team information
- Current team: Gyeongnam FC
- Number: 7

Senior career*
Years	Team	Apps	(Gls)
2016–2024	Incheon United	169	(21)
2018–2020	→ Sangju Sangmu (army)	35	(4)
2023	→ Seoul E-Land FC (loan)	19	(2)
2025–	Gyeongnam FC	8	(0)
- * Club domestic league appearances and goals as of 7 January 2026

Song Si-woo (Korean: 송시우; born 28 August 1993) is a South Korean footballer who plays for Gyeongnam FC.

== Career ==
On 23 June 2023, Si-woo was loaned to Seoul E-Land FC from Incheon United.
