= Ahn Jin-beom =

South Korean footballer

Personal information
- Date of birth: 10 March 1992 (age 34)
- Place of birth: Jeju, South Korea
- Height: 1.70 m (5 ft 7 in)
- Position: Attacking midfielder

Team information
- Current team: Seongnam FC
- Number: 22

Youth career
- 2011–2014: Korea University

Senior career*
Years	Team	Apps	(Gls)
2014	FC Anyang	0	(0)
2014–2016	Ulsan Hyundai	24	(2)
2015	→ Incheon United (loan)	9	(0)
2016	→ FC Anyang (loan)	27	(0)
2017–2019	FC Anyang	17	(0)
2018–2019	→ Sangju Sangmu (army)	21	(0)
2020	Incheon United	3	(0)
2021–	Seongnam FC	31	(1)

International career
2009	South Korea U-17	11	(0)
2010–2011	South Korea U-20	0	(0)
- * Club domestic league appearances and goals as of 28 December 2019

Ahn Jin-beom (Korean: 안진범; Hanja: 安進範; born 10 March 1992) is a South Korean footballer who plays as midfielder for Seongnam FC in K League 1.

== Club career ==
He moved to Ulsan Hyundai in exchange for Choi Jin-soo right after he joined FC Anyang in February 2014.
