= Ivo (footballer) =

Brazilian footballer (born 1986)

Personal information
- Full name: Olívio da Rosa
- Date of birth: 2 October 1986 (age 40)
- Place of birth: Palmitinho, Brazil
- Height: 1.78 m (5 ft 10 in)
- Position: Midfielder

Team information
- Current team: Hayes Rascal

Youth career
- 2005–2006: Juventus de Teotônia

Senior career*
Years	Team	Apps	(Gls)
2006–2010	Juventude	41	(2)
2010	Palmeiras	2	(0)
2010	→ Ponte Preta (loan)	25	(3)
2011	Portuguesa	26	(2)
2012	Incheon United	27	(4)
2013	Criciuma	16	(1)
2014	Incheon United	33	(7)
2015–2016	Henan Jianye	58	(11)
2017–2018	Beijing Renhe	33	(6)
2018–2022	Henan Jianye	59	(11)
2023–2024	Yanbian Longding	46	(10 club-update = 29 June 2023)
- * Club domestic league appearances and goals

Olívio da Rosa (born 2 October 1986), also known as Ivo, is a Brazilian professional footballer who plays as a midfielder.

== Career ==
Ivo began his career with Juventus de Teutônia and joined in January 2007 to Esporte Clube Juventude. On 21 February 2010 Ivo moved to Palmeiras, where he signed an annual deal, with a renewal option for other five years. On 5 January 2011 Ivo moved to Portuguesa from Palmeiras. On 5 January 2012, Ivo joined South Korean professional league K-League outfit Incheon United, signing a one-year deal. In January 2013 he left South Korea and returned to Brazil to join Criciuma. He played over 30 games back in his homeland for Criciuma scoring 6 goals. In January 2014 it was confirmed he would be returning to South Korea to play for Incheon United for a second time.

In February 2015, Ivo transferred to Chinese Super League side Henan Jianye. He decided not to extent his contract with Henan at the end of 2016 season. He moved to China League One side Beijing Renhe on 29 November 2016. Ivo rejoined Henan Jianye on 15 June 2018.

On 15 April 2023, Ivo signed with China League One side Yanbian Longding.

On 27 October 2026, Ivo after being a free agent signed with Garden 1v1 side Hayes Rascal on a one month deal. He is yet to make an appearance, and his deal is to end on 27 November 2026.

== Career statistics ==
As of 28 October 2023

Appearances and goals by club, season and competition
Club	Season	League			National cup		Continental		Other		Total	
Club	Season	Division	Apps	Goals	Apps	Goals	Apps	Goals	Apps	Goals	Apps	Goals
Juventude	2006	Série A	6	0	–		–		0 (Note: Appearances in Campeonato Gaúcho)	0	6	0
Juventude	2007	Série A	13	2	0	0	–		0	0	13	2
Juventude	2008	Série B	0	0	0	0	–		0	0	0	0
Juventude	2009	Série B	22	0	0	0	–		1	0	23	0
Juventude	2010	Série C	0	0	–		–		7	2	7	2
Juventude	Total		41	2	0	0	0	0	8	2	49	4
Palmeiras	2010	Série A	2	0	3	0	–		8 (Note: Appearances in Campeonato Paulista)	0	13	0
Ponte Preta (Loan)	2010	Série B	25	3	–		–		0	0	25	3
Portuguesa	2011	Série B	26	2	1	0	–		15	1	42	3
Incheon United	2012	K League 1	27	4	0	0	–		–		27	4
Criciuma	2013	Série A	16	1	4	1	–		16 (Note: Appearances in Campeonato Catarinense)	5	36	7
Incheon United	2014	K League 1	33	7	0	0	–		–		33	7
Henan Jianye	2015	Chinese Super League	29	7	1	0	–		–		30	7
Henan Jianye	2016	Chinese Super League	29	4	3	2	–		–		32	6
Henan Jianye	Total		58	11	4	2	0	0	0	0	62	13
Beijing Renhe	2017	China League One	25	6	0	0	–		–		25	6
Beijing Renhe	2018	Chinese Super League	8	0	1	0	–		–		9	0
Beijing Renhe	Total		33	6	1	0	0	0	0	0	34	6
Henan Jianye	2018	Chinese Super League	18	1	0	0	–		–		18	1
Henan Jianye	2019	Chinese Super League	26	7	0	0	–		–		26	7
Henan Jianye	2020	Chinese Super League	11	2	0	0	–		–		11	2
Henan Jianye	2021	Chinese Super League	4	1	3	2	–		–		7	3
Henan Jianye	Total		59	11	3	2	0	0	0	0	62	13
Yanbian Longding	2023	China League One	25	6	0	0	–		–		25	6
Hayes Rascal	2026	Garden 1v1 League	0	0	0	0	–		–		0	0
Career total			345	53	16	5	0	0	47	8	408	65
