= Ku Hyun-jun =

South Korean footballer

Personal information
- Date of birth: 13 December 1993 (age 32)
- Place of birth: South Korea
- Height: 1.83 m (6 ft 0 in)
- Position: Defender

Team information
- Current team: Jeonnam Dragons
- Number: 4

Senior career*
Years	Team	Apps	(Gls)
2012–2023	Busan IPark	83	(1)
2020–2021	Siheung Citizen FC (loan)	10	(0)
2023–2024	Chungbuk Cheongju	57	(2)
2025–	Jeonnam Dragons	25	(1)

International career
2011–2012	South Korea U-20	5	(0)
2015–2016	South Korea U-23	8	(0)
- * Club domestic league appearances and goals as of 8 August 2026

Ku Hyun-jun (Korean: 구현준; born December 13, 1993) is a South Korean football player who currently plays as a left back for Jeonnam Dragons.

== Club career ==
Ku made his debut for Busan IPark on 27 June 2012 in a 5-2 defeat to Jeju United.

Ku completed his military service with K4 League side Siheung Citizen FC before returning to parent club Busan IPark midway through the 2021 K League 2 season.

== Club career statistics ==
As of 17 October 2022

Club performance			League		Cup		Playoffs		Total	
Season	Club	League	Apps	Goals	Apps	Goals	Apps	Goals	Apps	Goals
South Korea			League		KFA Cup		Playoffs		Total	
2012	Busan IPark	K League 1	1	0	0	0	0	0	1	0
2013	Busan IPark	K League 1	1	0	0	0	0	0	1	0
2014	Busan IPark	K League 1	2	0	0	0	0	0	2	0
2015	Busan IPark	K League 1	11	0	0	0	0	0	11	0
2016	Busan IPark	K League 2	14	0	2	0	0	0	16	0
2017	Busan IPark	K League 2	19	1	4	0	0	0	23	1
2018	Busan IPark	K League 2	15	0	3	0	2	0	20	0
2019	Busan IPark	K League 2	6	0	0	0	0	0	6	0
2021	Busan IPark	K League 2	1	0	0	0	0	0	1	0
2022	Busan IPark	K League 2	13	0	1	0	0	0	14	0
Career total			83	1	10	0	2	0	95	1
