= Palmitinho =

Municipality in Rio Grande do Sul, Brazil

Coordinates: 27°20′S 53°34′W

- Municipality
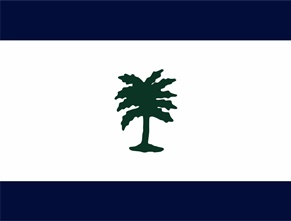
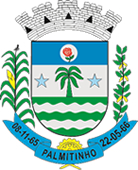
- Flag Coat of arms
- Interactive map of Palmitinho
- Country: Brazil
- Time zone: UTC−3 (BRT)

Palmitinho is a municipality in the state of Rio Grande do Sul, Brazil. As of 2020, the estimated population was 7,056.

== See also ==
- List of municipalities in Rio Grande do Sul
