= Bae Seul-ki (footballer) =

South Korean footballer (born 1985)

Personal information
- Date of birth: 9 June 1985 (age 41)
- Place of birth: South Korea
- Height: 1.83 m (6 ft 0 in)
- Position: Centre back

Team information
- Current team: Pohang Steelers
- Number: 24

Youth career
- 1998–2000: Jeonnam Dragons U-15
- 2001–2003: Jeonnam Dragons U-18
- 2004–2007: Konkuk University

Senior career*
Years	Team	Apps	(Gls)
2008–2009	Incheon Korail	31	(1)
2010–2011	Police FC (army)		
2012–	Pohang Steelers	135	(5)
- * Club domestic league appearances and goals as of 6 December 2019

Bae Seul-ki (Korean: 배슬기; born 9 June 1985) is a South Korean footballer who plays as centre back for Pohang Steelers.

== Career ==
In 2008, Bae signed with Incheon Korail after graduating from Konkuk University.

After finishing his military service in Police FC, He joined Pohang Steelers.
