= Jang Eun-kyu =

South Korean footballer (born 1992)

Personal information
- Full name: Jang Eun-kyu
- Date of birth: 15 August 1992 (age 34)
- Place of birth: South Korea
- Height: 1.73 m (5 ft 8 in)
- Position: Central midfielder

Team information
- Current team: Daejeon Korail FC

Youth career
- Konkuk University

Senior career*
Years	Team	Apps	(Gls)
2014–2020	Jeju United	32	(0)
2016	→ Gyeongnam FC (loan)	36	(1)
2017	→ Seongnam FC (loan)	9	(0)
2018	→ FC Anyang (loan)	5	(0)
2018–2020	→ Sangju Sangmu (army)	0	(0)
2020–	Daejeon Korail FC	0	(0)
- * Club domestic league appearances and goals as of 20 December 2019

Jang Eun-kyu (Korean: 장은규; born 15 August 1992) is a South Korean footballer who plays as midfielder for Daejeon Korail FC.

== Career ==
He joined Jeju United before 2014 season starts.
