= Hwang Jae-hun (footballer, born 1990) =

South Korean footballer (born 1990)

Personal information
- Full name: Hwang Jae-hun
- Date of birth: 25 November 1990 (age 35)
- Place of birth: South Korea
- Height: 1.78 m (5 ft 10 in)
- Positions: Full back; midfielder

Team information
- Current team: Daejeon Citizen
- Number: 3

Youth career
- 2006–2008: Gyeongnam FC

Senior career*
Years	Team	Apps	(Gls)
2009–2013	Gyeongnam FC	1	(0)
2011–2012	→ Sangju Sangmu (army)	5	(0)
2014	Chungju Hummel	5	(0)
2015–2017	Suwon FC	46	(3)
2018–	Daejeon Citizen	49	(1)
- * Club domestic league appearances and goals as of 1 December 2019

Hwang Jae-hun (Korean: 황재훈; born 25 November 1990) is a South Korean footballer who plays as full back for Daejeon Citizen in K League 2. He changed his name from Hwang Byung-in in September 2013.

== Career ==
Hwang joined Gyoengnam FC before 2009 season starts.
