= Kwon Hyuk-jin =

South Korean footballer (born 1984)

Kwon Hyuk-Jin
Personal information
- Full name: Kwon Hyuk-Jin (권혁진)
- Date of birth: December 25, 1984 (age 41)
- Place of birth: South Korea
- Height: 1.78 m (5 ft 10 in)
- Position: Midfielder

Senior career*
Years	Team	Apps	(Gls)
2007	Ulsan Hyundai	9	(1)
2008–2010	Daejeon Citizen	20	(2)
2009	→ Gwangju Sangmu (army)	3	(0)
2011	Daejeon KHNP	9	(1)
2012	Bangkok United		
- * Club domestic league appearances and goals as of 31 October 2011

Kwon Hyuk-Jin (born December 25, 1984) is a South Korean football player who since 2012 has played for Bangkok United. He formerly played for Ulsan Hyundai, Daejeon Citizen and was most recently with Daejeon Korea Hydro & Nuclear Power FC.
