= Kim Dong-suk =

South Korean footballer (born 1987)

Kim Dong-Suk 김동석
Personal information
- Full name: Kim Dong-Suk
- Date of birth: 26 March 1987 (age 39)
- Place of birth: Seoul, South Korea
- Height: 1.74 m (5 ft 9 in)
- Position: Centre midfielder

Team information
- Current team: Incheon United
- Number: 22

Senior career*
| Years | Team | Apps | (Gls) |
| 2003–2008 | Anyang LG Cheetahs / FC Seoul | 22 | (2) |
| 2008–2013 | Ulsan Hyundai | 39 | (0) |
| 2010 | → Daegu FC (loan) | 18 | (1) |
| 2014 | FC Seoul | 3 | (0) |
| 2015– | Incheon United | 44 | (2) |

International career
| 2006–2007 | South Korea U-20 | 11 | (1) |
- * Club domestic league appearances and goals as of 30 November 2014

- Kim Dong-suk
- Hangul: 김동석
- Hanja: 金東錫
- RR: Gim Dongseok
- MR: Kim Tongsŏk

Kim Dong-Suk (Korean: 김동석; born 26 March 1987) is a South Korean football player who currently plays for Incheon United.

== Club career ==
He joined in Anyang LG Cheetahs in 2003 when he was only 16. He made his professional debut in 2006, but he didn't become a first team regular until the 2007 season. Following a transfer to Ulsan Hyundai Horang-i in 2008, Kim struggled to establish himself as a first choice starter in the Ulsan squad, playing only 6 games that season. He has been loaned to Daegu FC for the 2010 season.

== International career ==
Kim Dong-Suk was a member of the 2007 FIFA U-20 World Cup squad, which failed to win a game at the tournament.

== Club career statistics ==
| Club performance | | | League | | Cup | | League Cup | | Continental | | Total | |
| Season | Club | League | Apps | Goals | Apps | Goals | Apps | Goals | Apps | Goals | Apps | Goals |
| South Korea | | | League | | KFA Cup | | League Cup | | Asia | | Total | |
|---|---|---|---|---|---|---|---|---|---|---|---|---|
| 2003 | Anyang LG Cheetahs | K League 1 | 0 | 0 | 0 | 0 | 0 | 0 | - | | 0 | 0 |
| 2004 | FC Seoul | K League 1 | 0 | 0 | 0 | 0 | 0 | 0 | - | | 0 | 0 |
| 2005 | FC Seoul | K League 1 | 0 | 0 | 0 | 0 | 0 | 0 | - | | 0 | 0 |
| 2006 | FC Seoul | K League 1 | 1 | 0 | 2 | 0 | 6 | 0 | - | | 9 | 0 |
| 2007 | FC Seoul | K League 1 | 21 | 2 | 1 | 0 | 7 | 0 | - | | 29 | 2 |
| 2008 | Ulsan Hyundai | K League 1 | 4 | 0 | 0 | 0 | 2 | 0 | - | | 6 | 0 |
| 2009 | Ulsan Hyundai | K League 1 | 0 | 0 | 0 | 0 | 0 | 0 | 0 | 0 | 0 | 0 |
| 2010 | Daegu FC | K League 1 | 18 | 1 | 0 | 0 | 1 | 0 | - | | 19 | 1 |
| 2011 | Ulsan Hyundai | K League 1 | | | | | | | - | | | |
| Career total | | | 44 | 3 | 3 | 0 | 16 | 0 | | | 63 | 3 |

== External golf links ==
- Kim Dong-suk – K League stats at kleague.com (in Korean and English)
