= Park Se-jik =

South Korean footballer (born 1989)

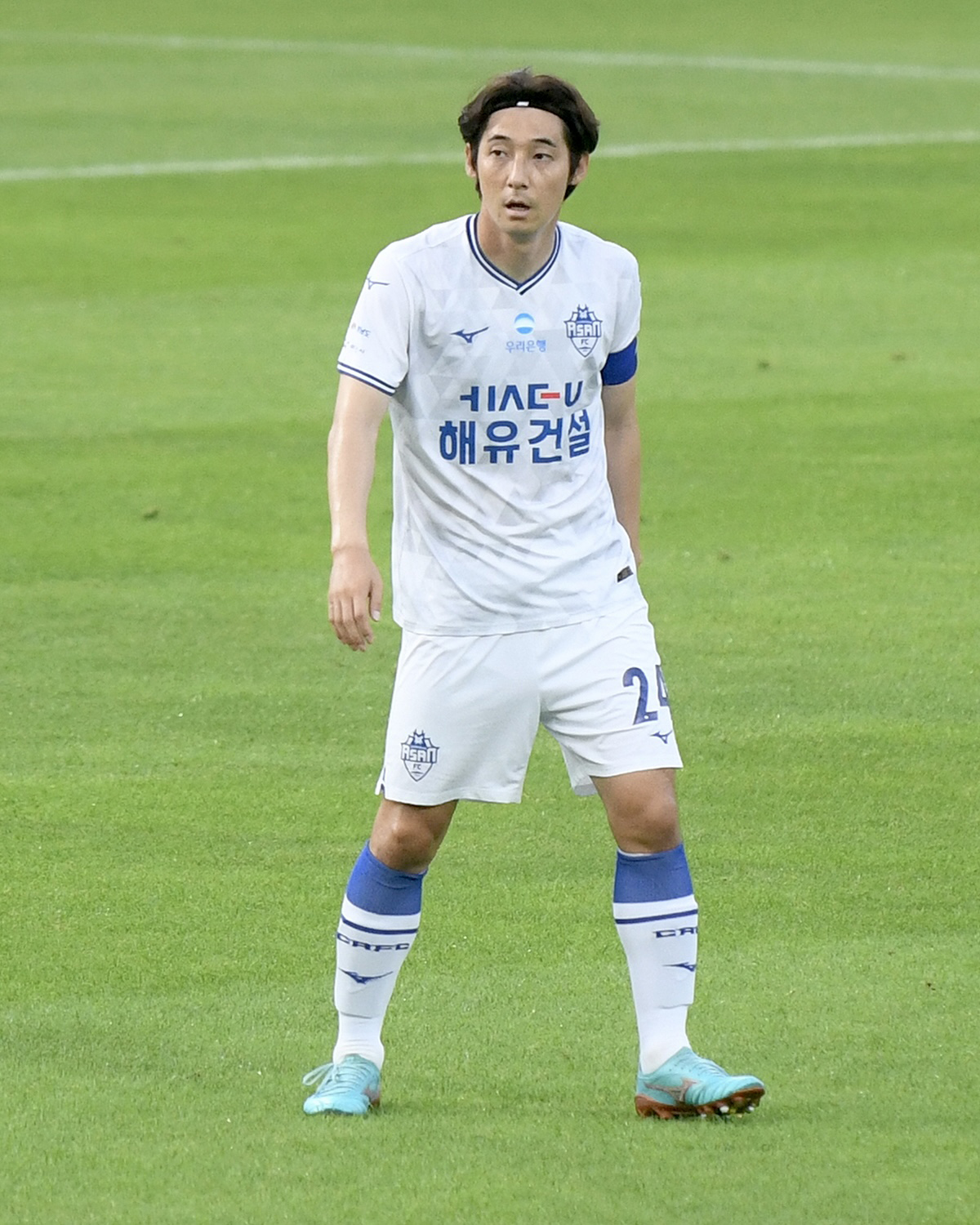
- Park in 2023

Personal information
- Date of birth: 25 May 1989 (age 37)
- Place of birth: Changwon, Gyeongsang, South Korea
- Height: 1.78 m (5 ft 10 in)
- Position: Midfielder

Team information
- Current team: Chungnam Asan FC
- Number: 24

Youth career
- 2005–2007: Masan Technical High School
- 2008–2011: Hanyang University

Senior career*
| Years | Team | Apps | (Gls) |
| 2012–2013 | Jeonbuk Hyundai Motors | 26 | (1) |
| 2015–2018 | Incheon United FC | 77 | (7) |
| 2017–2018 | → Asan Mugunghwa (army) | 25 | (1) |
| 2019– | Chungnam Asan FC | 167 | (4) |
- * Club domestic league appearances and goals as of 6 August 2026

- Park Se-jik
- Hangul: 박세직
- Hanja: 朴世直
- RR: Bak Sejik
- MR: Pak Sejik

Park Se-jik (Korean: 박세직; born 25 May 1989) is a South Korean footballer who plays as a midfielder for Chungnam Asan FC.
