= Park Dae-han (footballer, born 1991) =

South Korean footballer

Personal information
- Full name: Park Dae-han
- Date of birth: 1 May 1991 (age 35)
- Place of birth: South Korea
- Height: 1.73 m (5 ft 8 in)
- Position: Full-back

Team information
- Current team: Gimpo FC

Youth career
- 2010–2013: Sungkyunkwan University

Senior career*
Years	Team	Apps	(Gls)
2014	Gangwon FC	3	(0)
2015–2016	Incheon United	61	(1)
2017–2020	Jeonnam Dragons	28	(1)
2018–2019	→ Sangju Sangmu (army)	4	(0)
2020	→ Incheon United (loan)	3	(0)
2021	FC Anyang	18	(0)
2022-	Gimpo FC		
- * Club domestic league appearances and goals as of 16 February 2022

Park Dae-han (Korean: 박대한; born 1 May 1991) is a South Korean footballer who plays as full-back for Gimpo FC.

== Career ==
Park Dae-han joined K League 2 side Gangwon FC after the trial in February 2014.
