= Kim Yong-hwan (footballer) =

South Korean footballer (born 1993)

Personal information
- Full name: Kim Yong-hwan
- Date of birth: 25 May 1993 (age 33)
- Place of birth: South Korea
- Height: 1.76 m (5 ft 9 in)
- Position: Full-back

Team information
- Current team: Jeonnam Dragons
- Number: 13

Youth career
- 2010–2012: Daegun High School
- 2012–2014: Soongsil University

Senior career*
Years	Team	Apps	(Gls)
2014–2018	Incheon United	93	(5)
2019–2023	Pohang Steelers	70	(2)
2020–2021	→ Sangju / Gimcheon Sangmu (army)	20	(1)
2024–	Jeonnam Dragons	54	(1)

International career^{‡}
2013	South Korea U-20	8	(0)
2014–2016	South Korea U-23	5	(0)
- * Club domestic league appearances and goals as of 8 August 2026 ‡ National team caps and goals as of 6 November 2016

- Kim Yong-hwan
- Hangul: 김용환
- Hanja: 金容奐
- RR: Gim Yonghwan
- MR: Kim Yonghwan

Kim Yong-hwan (Korean: 김용환; born 25 May 1993) is a South Korean football full-back for Jeonnam Dragons.

On 10 October 2013 when the Brazil national football team went to South Korea to train, Kim joined the training with the Brazil national football team including Neymar, Dani Alves, etc. Kim's main position is full-back, but he can assimilate other positions including wing-back and winger. He has great speed and overlapping ability.

== Club career ==
=== Early career ===
Kim went on to Daegun High School, the Incheon United's under-18 team in 2010. In 2012, he graduated Daegun High School and entered Soongsil University. In 2014, after his sophomore year, It was confirmed that he would enter Incheon United.

=== Incheon United ===
Kim joined Incheon United in 2014. He made his professional debut against FC Seoul in Korean FA Cup on 30 April 2014 at Seoul World Cup Stadium. In the match, Kim played as a starting line-up. In the 2014 season, when Kim made his debut, he played 14 games in league. In the 2015 season, he played only 3 games (38 minutes) because of his chronic disease. In the 2016 season, he planted himself in the team again. On 24 September 2016, he scored his professional debut goal against Suwon Samsung Bluewings at Incheon Football Stadium. He played 28 games including 22 full-time games and he scored 3 goals. On 5 November 2016, he scored a winning goal against Suwon FC. Incheon United owed confirmation of remaining in the K League Classic to his winning goal.

== International career ==
Kim started his international football team career with the South Korea national under-20 football team in 2013. He participated in 2013 Toulon Tournament and 2014 Toulon Tournament as a member of South Korea national under-20 football team. He also took part in 2013 FIFA U-20 World Cup. In this competition, Kim played 5 games and was shown a yellow card on 3 July 2013 against Colombia national under-20 football team.

== Club career statistics ==
Club performance			League		Cup		continental		Total	
Season	Club	League	Apps	Goals	Apps	Goals	Apps	Goals	Apps	Goals
South Korea			League		KFA Cup		Asia		Total	
2014	Incheon United	K League 1	14	0	1	0	—		15	0
2015	Incheon United	K League 1	3	0	0	0	—		3	0
2016	Incheon United	K League 1	30	2	1	0	—		31	2
2017	Incheon United	K League 1	18	0	0	0	—		18	0
2018	Incheon United	K League 1	28	3	0	0	—		28	3
2019	Pohang Steelers	K League 1	35	2	0	0	—		35	2
2020	Pohang Steelers	K League 1	3	0	0	0	—		3	0
2021	Gimcheon Sangmu	K League 2	20	1	0	0	—		20	1
2021	Pohang Steelers	K League 1	2	0	0	0	—		2	0
Total	South Korea		153	8	2	0	0	0	155	8
Career total			153	8	2	0	0	0	155	8
