= Kwon Wan-kyu =

South Korean footballer (born 1991)

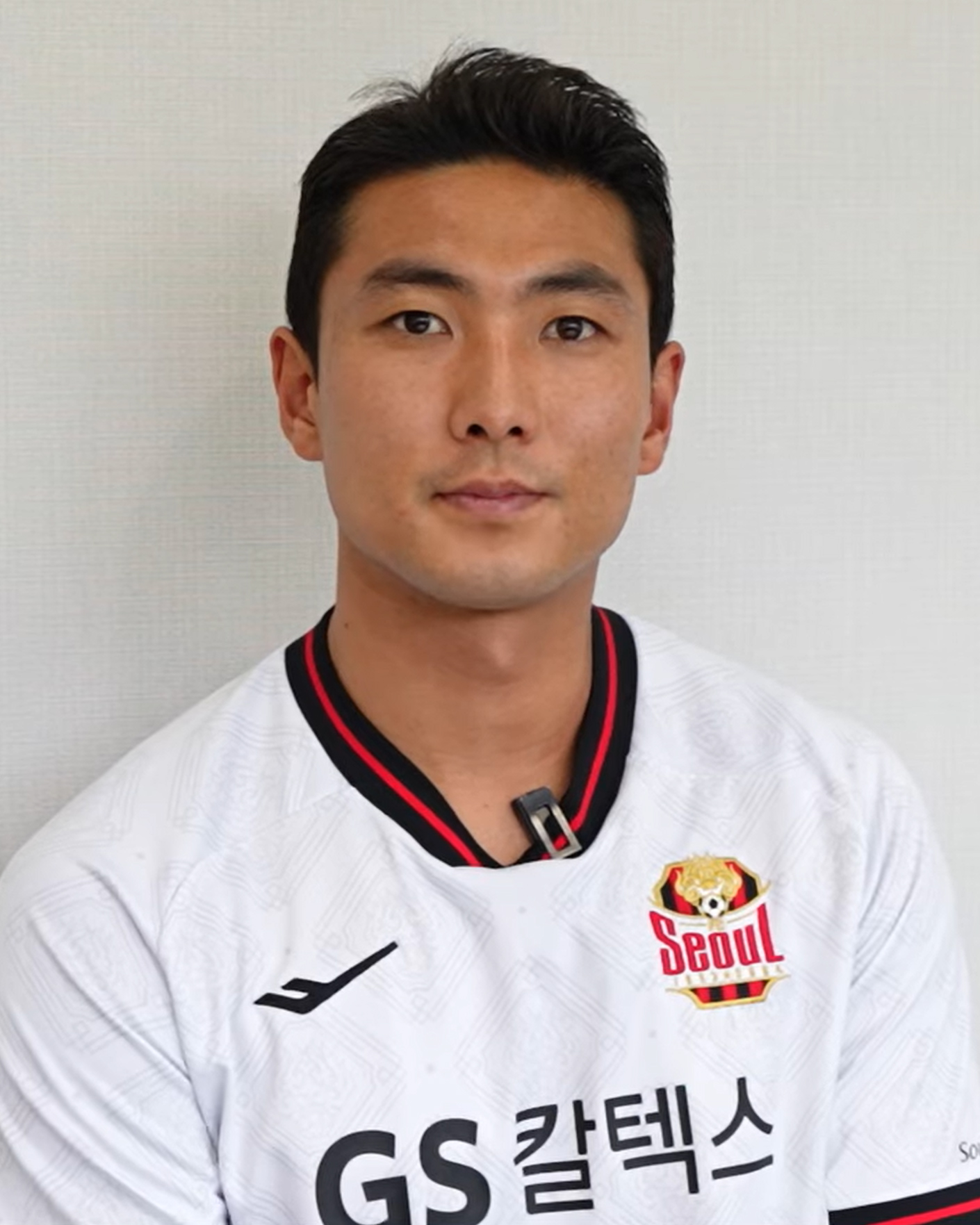
- Kwon in 2023

Personal information
- Full name: Kwon Wan-kyu
- Date of birth: 20 November 1991 (age 34)
- Place of birth: South Korea
- Height: 1.83 m (6 ft 0 in)
- Position: Center back

Team information
- Current team: Suwon Samsung Bluewings
- Number: 12

Youth career
- 2010–2013: Sungkyunkwan University

Senior career*
Years	Team	Apps	(Gls)
2014	Gyeongnam FC	17	(1)
2015–2016	Incheon United	55	(3)
2017–2021	Pohang Steelers	93	(2)
2018–2019	→ Sangju Sangmu (army)	43	(2)
2022–2023	Seongnam FC	25	(2)
2023–2024	→ FC Seoul (loan)	34	(3)
2025–	Suwon Samsung Bluewings	18	(0)
- * Club domestic league appearances and goals as of 6 January 2026

Kwon Wan-kyu (Korean: 권완규; born 20 November 1991) is a South Korean footballer who plays as Center back for Suwon Samsung Bluewings.

== Career ==
He was selected by Gyeongnam FC in the 2014 K League draft.

Wan-kyu joined Suwon Samsung Bluewings in January 2025.

== Career statistics ==
As of match played 21 September 2024

Appearances and goals by club, season and competition
Club	Season	League			Korea Cup		Continental		Other		Total	
Club	Season	Division	Apps	Goals	Apps	Goals	Apps	Goals	Apps	Goals	Apps	Goals
Gyeongnam	2014	K League Classic	17	1	0	0	—		0	0	17	1
Incheon United	2015	K League Classic	34	1	4	1	—		—		38	2
Incheon United	2016	K League Classic	21	2	1	0	—		—		22	2
Incheon United	Total		55	3	5	1	0	0	0	0	60	4
Pohang Steelers	2017	K League Classic	32	0	0	0	—		—		32	0
Pohang Steelers	2018	K League 1	10	0	0	0	—		—		10	0
Pohang Steelers	2020	K League 1	14	1	2	0	—		—		16	1
Pohang Steelers	2021	K League 1	37	1	2	0	10 (Note: Appearance(s) in AFC Champions League)	0	—		49	1
Pohang Steelers	Total		93	2	4	0	10	0	0	0	107	2
Sangju Sangmu (Army)	2018	K League 1	12	1	0	0	—		—		12	1
Sangju Sangmu (Army)	2019	K League 1	31	1	2	0	—		—		33	1
Sangju Sangmu (Army)	Total		43	2	2	0	0	0	0	0	45	2
Seongnam	2022	K League 1	25	2	1	0	—		—		26	2
FC Seoul (loan)	2023	K League 1	8	0	0	0	—		—		8	0
FC Seoul	2024	K League 1	26	2	2	0	—		—		28	2
Career total			267	12	14	1	10	0	0	0	291	13
