= Bae Seung-jin =

South Korean footballer

Bae Seung-Jin
Personal information
- Full name: Bae Seung-Jin
- Date of birth: 3 November 1987 (age 38)
- Place of birth: South Korea
- Height: 1.82 m (6 ft 0 in)
- Positions: Centre-back; defensive midfielder

Team information
- Current team: Gyeongnam FC
- Number: 53

Youth career
- Busan I'Park

Senior career*
Years	Team	Apps	(Gls)
2007	Yokohama FC	0	(0)
2008	Thespa Kusatsu	19	(0)
2009–2011	Tokushima Vortis	93	(6)
2012–2013	Yokohama FC	73	(3)
2014–2016	Incheon United	15	(0)
2015–2016	→ Ansan Mugunghwa	33	(0)
2017	Seongnam FC	20	(0)
2018	Yokohama FC	25	(1)
2019–	Gyeongnam FC	7	(0)

International career
2005–2007	South Korea U-20	24	(1)
2007	South Korea U-23	1	(0)
- * Club domestic league appearances and goals as of 7 January 2020

- Bae Seung-jin
- Hangul: 배승진
- Hanja: 裵乗振
- RR: Bae Seungjin
- MR: Pae Sŭngjin

Bae Seung-Jin (Korean: 배승진; born 3 November 1987) is a South Korean footballer who currently plays for Gyeongnam FC.

Bae was a defender on the South Korea national U-20 team playing at the 2007 FIFA U-20 World Cup. He was a part of South Korea U-23 team of 2008 Summer Olympics qualifying. He spent seven years playing in the Japanese League.

He moved to Seongnam FC as Incheon United FC agreed to swap him with Park Yong-ji.

== Club statistics ==
Club performance			League		Cup		League Cup		Total	
Season	Club	League	Apps	Goals	Apps	Goals	Apps	Goals	Apps	Goals
2007	Yokohama FC	J1 League	0	0	0	0	0	0	0	0
2008	Thespa Kusatsu	J2 League	19	0	2	0	-		21	0
2009	Tokushima Vortis	J2 League	45	5	1	0	-		46	5
2010	Tokushima Vortis	J2 League	31	1	2	0	-		33	1
2011	Tokushima Vortis	J2 League	17	0	1	0	-		18	0
2012	Yokohama FC	J2 League	36	0	1	0	-		37	0
2013	Yokohama FC	J2 League	37	3	1	0	-		38	3
2014	Incheon United	K League 1	11	0	0	0	-		11	0
2015	Asan Mugunghwa FC	K League 2	33	0	0	0	-		33	0
2016	Asan Mugunghwa FC	K League 2	7	2	0	0	-		11	2
2016	Incheon United FC	K League 1	4	0	0	0	-		4	0
2017	Seongnam FC	K League 2	0	0	0	0	-		0	0
Total			240	11	8	0	0	0	252	11
