= Jin Seong-uk =

South Korean footballer

Jin Seong-wook
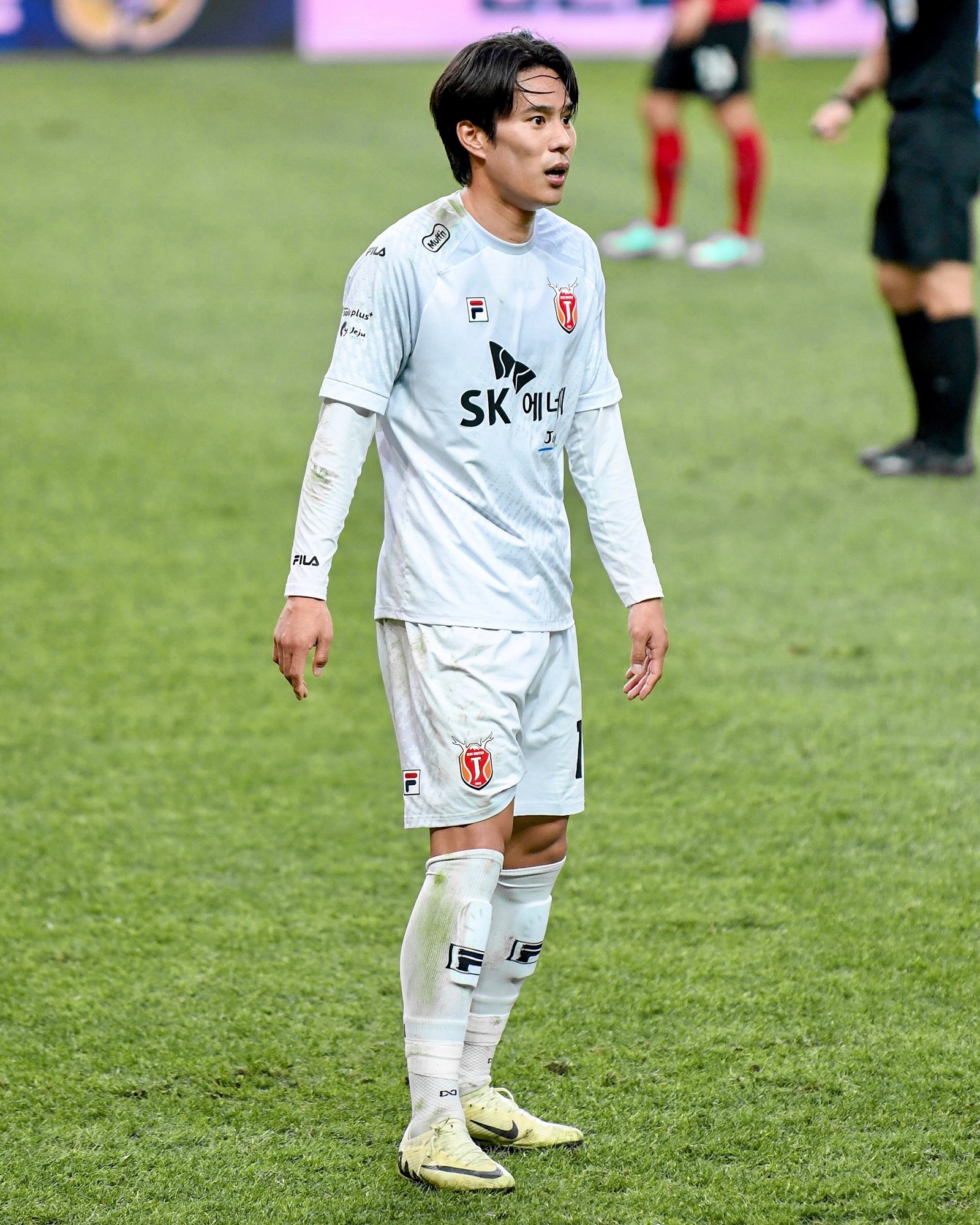
- Jin in 2024

Personal information
- Date of birth: 16 December 1993 (age 32)
- Place of birth: Changwon, South Korea
- Height: 1.83 m (6 ft 0 in)
- Position: Forward

Youth career
- –2012: Daegun High School

Senior career*
Years	Team	Apps	(Gls)
2012–2016	Incheon United	86	(15)
2017–	Jeju United	121	(16)
2019–2020	→ Sangju Sangmu (army)	11	(0)
2023	→ Seongnam FC (loan)	15	(3)
2025	Seongnam FC	4	(0)

International career^{‡}
2012	South Korea U20	0	(0)
2015–2016	South Korea U23	6	(1)
2017–	South Korea	4	(0)
- * Club domestic league appearances and goals as of 6 January 2026 ‡ National team caps and goals as of 3 February 2018

- Jin Seong-uk
- Hangul: 진성욱
- Hanja: 陳成昱
- RR: Jin Seonguk
- MR: Chin Sŏnguk

Jin Seong-uk (Korean: 진성욱; Hanja: 陳成昱; born 16 December 1993) is a South Korean football forward.

== Club career ==
Jin joined Incheon United in 2012. On 18 March 2012, he made his league debut against Daegu FC by replacing Kim Han-seob.

== International career ==
He has been a member of the South Korea national U-23 team. He played for the South Korea in 2016 AFC U-23 Championship, played 2 games and scored 1 goal there. His first goal was scored against Japan U-23 team in Final on 30 January 2016.

== Career statistics ==
Club	Season	League			Cup		continental		Total	
Club	Season	Division	Apps	Goals	Apps	Goals	Apps	Goals	Apps	Goals
Incheon United	2012	K League 1	2	0	0	0	—		2	0
Incheon United	2013	K League 1	0	0	0	0	—		0	0
Incheon United	2014	K League 1	26	6	1	0	—		27	6
Incheon United	2015	K League 1	27	4	5	0	—		32	4
Incheon United	2016	K League 1	31	5	3	0	—		34	5
Incheon United	Total		86	13	9	0	—		95	13
Jeju United	2017	K League 1	29	5	2	1	6	1	37	7
Jeju United	2018	K League 1	25	2	3	0	4	2	32	4
Jeju United	2020	K League 2	8	5	0	0	—		8	5
Jeju United	2021	K League 1	23	0	0	0	—		23	0
Jeju United	2022	K League 1	19	2	0	0	—		19	2
Jeju United	Total		104	14	5	1	10	3	119	18
Sangju Sangmu (army)	2019	K League 1	6	0	2	1	—		8	1
Sangju Sangmu (army)	2020	K League 1	5	0	0	0	—		5	0
Sangju Sangmu (army)	Total		11	0	2	1	—		13	1
Career total			201	29	16	2	10	3	227	34

== Honours ==
=== International ===
- EAFF East Asian Cup (1): 2017
