= Yun Sang-ho =

South Korean footballer (born 1992)

Personal information
- Full name: Yun Sang-ho
- Date of birth: 4 June 1992 (age 34)
- Place of birth: South Korea
- Height: 1.78 m (5 ft 10 in)
- Position: Midfielder

Team information
- Current team: Incheon United
- Number: 8

Senior career*
| Years | Team | Apps | (Gls) |
| 2014–2018 | Incheon United | 51 | (0) |
| 2014 | Gwangju FC | 13 | (0) |
| 2019- | Seoul E-Land FC | | |
- * Club domestic league appearances and goals as of 15:13, 13 August 2017 (UTC)

Yun Sang-ho (Korean: 윤상호; born 4 June 1992) is a South Korean footballer who plays for Seoul E-Land FC.
