= Kim Do-hyuk =

South Korean footballer (born 1992)

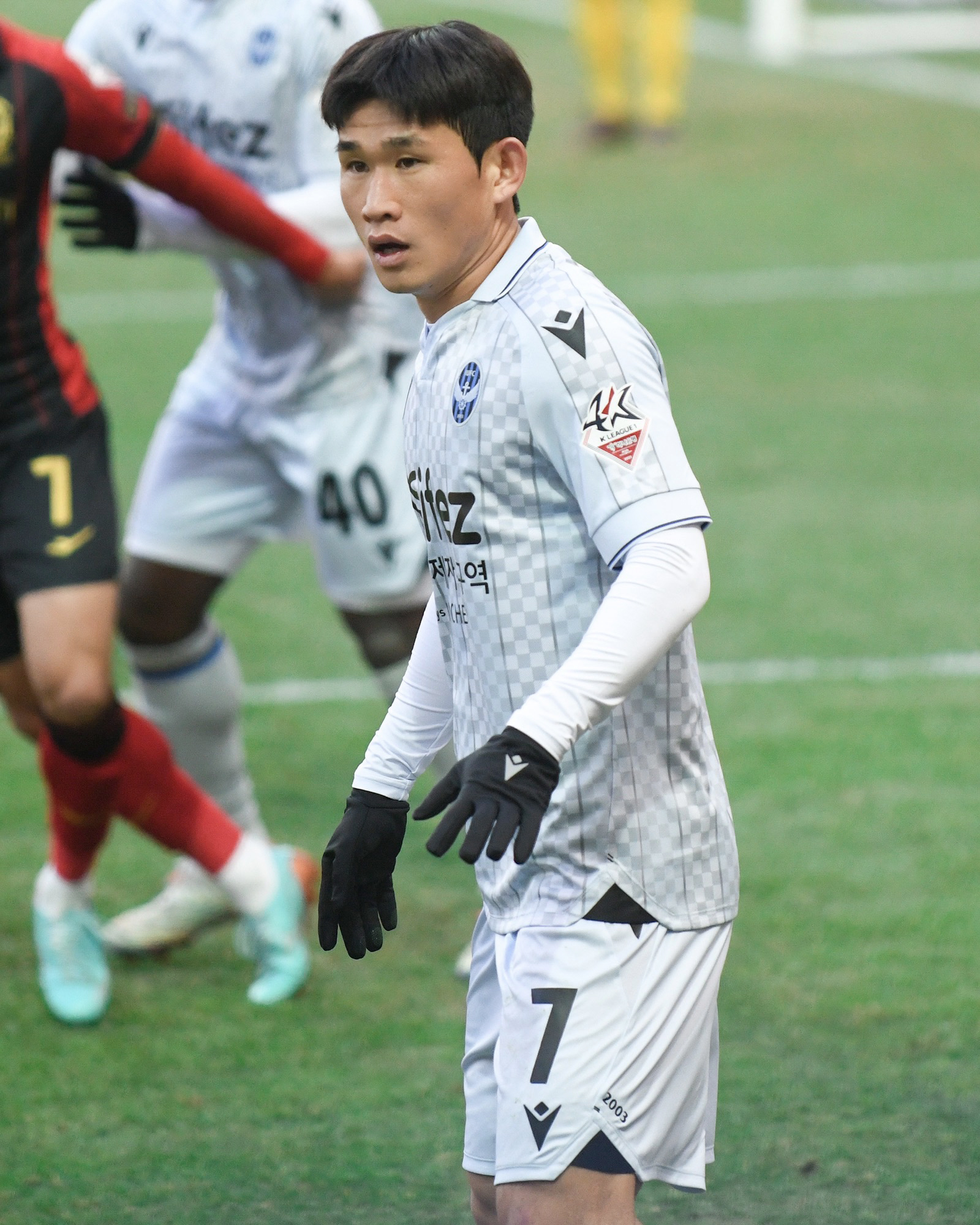
- Kim in 2023

Personal information
- Date of birth: 8 February 1992 (age 34)
- Place of birth: Namhae, Gyeongsangnam-do, South Korea
- Height: 1.74 m (5 ft 9 in)
- Position: Midfielder

Team information
- Current team: Gimpo FC
- Number: 7

Senior career*
Years	Team	Apps	(Gls)
2014–2025	Incheon United	270	(17)
2018–2019	→ Asan Mugunghwa (loan)	36	(1)
2026–	Gimpo FC	19	(0)
- * Club domestic league appearances and goals as of 6 August 2026

Kim Do-hyuk (Korean: 김도혁; born 8 February 1992) is a South Korean footballer who plays for Gimpo FC.

In 2018, he joined Asan Mugunghwa on loan for his military service.
