= Kim Jin-hwan (footballer) =

South Korean footballer (born 1989)

Kim Jin-Hwan
Personal information
- Full name: Kim Jin-Hwan
- Date of birth: 1 March 1989 (age 37)
- Place of birth: South Korea
- Height: 1.86 m (6 ft 1 in)
- Position: Defender

Youth career
- 2007–2010: Kyunghee University

Senior career*
Years	Team	Apps	(Gls)
2011–2013	Gangwon FC	46	(0)
2014–2015	Incheon United	22	(3)
2016–2019	Gwangju FC	22	(1)
2016	→ FC Anyang (loan)	17	(0)
2017–2018	→ Sangju Sangmu (army)	19	(0)
2020–2022	Seoul E-Land FC	38	(3)
- * Club domestic league appearances and goals as of 20 December 2022

Kim Jin-hwan (Korean: 김진환; born 1 March 1989) is a South Korean former football defender.

During his career, he played for Gangwon FC, Incheon United, Gwangju FC, FC Anyang, Sangju Sangmu FC, and Seoul E-Land FC.

== Club career ==
Kim, having spent his youth football career with Kyunghee University, was selected by Gangwon FC from the 2011 K-League draft intake. He made his professional debut in the club's 5 - 0 win over Gwangju FC in the first round match of the 2011 K-League Cup.

On 20 December 2022, he has retired and started his career as a manager of U-12 team of Seoul E-Land FC.

== Club career statistics ==
As of 20 December 2022

Club performance			League		Cup		League Cup		Total	
Season	Club	League	Apps	Goals	Apps	Goals	Apps	Goals	Apps	Goals
South Korea			League		KFA Cup		League Cup		Total	
2011	Gangwon FC	K League 1	15	0	1	0	4	0	20	0
2012	Gangwon FC	K League 1	19	0	1	0	-		20	0
2013	Gangwon FC	K League 1	12	0	1	0	-		13	0
2014	Incheon United	K League 1	2	0	0	0	-		2	0
2015	Incheon United	K League 1	20	3	2	1	-		22	4
2016	Gwangju FC	K League 1	5	0	1	0	-		6	0
2016	FC Anyang	K League Challenge	17	0	0	0	-		17	0
2017	Sangju Sangmu FC	K League 1	7	0	1	0	-		8	0
2018	Sangju Sangmu FC	K League 1	12	0	0	0	-		12	0
2018	Gwangju FC	K League 2	5	0	0	0	-		5	0
2019	Gwangju FC	K League 2	12	1	1	0	-		13	0
2020	Seoul E-Land FC	K League 2	11	1	1	1	-		12	2
2021	Seoul E-Land FC	K League 2	22	2	2	0	-		24	2
2022	Seoul E-Land FC	K League 2	5	0	0	0	-		5	0
Career total			164	7	11	2	4	0	179	9
