= Kim Dae-joong (footballer) =

South Korean footballer (born 1992)

Personal information
- Full name: Kim Dae-joong
- Date of birth: 13 October 1992 (age 34)
- Place of birth: South Korea
- Height: 1.90 m (6 ft 3 in)
- Position: Defender

Team information
- Current team: Cheonan City
- Number: 15

Senior career*
Years	Team	Apps	(Gls)
2014	Daejeon Citizen	7	(0)
2015–2023	Incheon United	102	(3)
2019–2020	→ Sangju Sangmu (army)	3	(0)
2024–	Cheonan City	4	(0)
- * Club domestic league appearances and goals as of 1 September 2022

Kim Dae-joong (Korean: 김대중; born 13 October 1992) is a South Korean footballer who plays for Cheonan City.
