= 2013 Incheon United FC season =

Incheon United F.C.
2013 season
- Chairman: Song Young-Gil
- Manager: Kim Bong-Gil
- K League Classic: 7th
- Korean FA Cup: Quarter-finals
- Top goalscorer: League: Lee Seok-Hyun; Diogo (7 goals each); All: Lee Seok-Hyun; Diogo (7 goals each)
- Highest home attendance: 15,595 vs Seoul (6 October)
- Lowest home attendance: 1,902 vs Jeonbuk (11 September)
- Average home league attendance: 7,077 league only
Home colours	Away colours

The 2013 season was Incheon United's ninth season in the K-League in South Korea. Incheon United competed in K League Classic and Korean FA Cup. It also marked the tenth anniversary of the club's founding and Kim Bong-Gil's first full season as manager.

== Current squad ==
Note: Flags indicate national team as defined under FIFA eligibility rules; some limited exceptions apply. Players may hold more than one non-FIFA nationality.

No.	Pos.	Nation	Player
1	GK	KOR	Kwon Jung-Hyuk
2	DF	KOR	Park Ji-Soo
3	DF	KOR	Jeon Jun-Hyung
4	DF	KOR	Kim Tae-Yoon
5	MF	KOR	Kim Nam-Il (captain)
6	MF	KOR	Son Dae-Ho
7	FW	KOR	Nam Joon-Jae
8	FW	KOR	Kim Jae-Woong
9	FW	KOR	Seol Ki-Hyeon
10	FW	KOR	Lee Chun-Soo
11	FW	BRA	Thiago
13	DF	KOR	Park Tae-Min
14	DF	KOR	Kim Chang-Hoon
15	FW	KOR	Jin Sung-Wook
16	DF	KOR	Lee Yoon-Pyo
17	MF	KOR	Moon Sang-Yoon
18	MF	BRA	Francis
19	FW	BRA	Diogo

No.	Pos.	Nation	Player
20	DF	KOR	An Jae-Jun
21	GK	KOR	Jo Su-Huk
22	DF	KOR	Yoo Jae-Ho
23	MF	KOR	Lee Seok-Hyun
24	MF	KOR	Koo Bon-Sang
25	MF	KOR	Choi Jong-hoan
26	DF	KOR	Jeon Hyung-Seop
27	FW	KOR	Han Kyo-Won
28	FW	KOR	Lee Hyo-Kyun
29	MF	KOR	Lee Dae-Myung
30	DF	KOR	Kim Kyung-Min
31	GK	KOR	Kim Kyo-Bin
32	DF	KOR	Kim Joo-Bin
34	FW	AUS	Nathan Burns
35	DF	KOR	Kang Young-Yeon
36	DF	KOR	Cho Kyum-Son
37	DF	KOR	Kang Yong
41	GK	KOR	Yoon Pyung-Guk

=== Out on loan ===
Note: Flags indicate national team as defined under FIFA eligibility rules; some limited exceptions apply. Players may hold more than one non-FIFA nationality.

No.	Pos.	Nation	Player
—	GK	KOR	Yoo Hyun (to Police for military service)
—	DF	KOR	Hong Sun-Man (to Cheonan City)

No.	Pos.	Nation	Player
—	FW	KOR	Kim Myung-Woon (to Sangju Sangmu Phoenix for military service)

== Transfers ==
=== In ===
#	Name	POS	Moving from	Mode	Window	Period	Fee	Notes
	(South Korea) An Jae-Jun	DF	(South Korea) Chunnam Dragons	Transfer	Winter		Cash + Trade	Traded with Han Jae-Woong for Park Jun-Tae and cash
	(South Korea) Han Jae-Woong	FW	(South Korea) Chunnam Dragons	Transfer	Winter		Cash + Trade	Traded with An Jae-Jun for Park Jun-Tae and cash
	(Brazil) Diogo	FW	(Brazil) São Bernardo	Transfer	Winter			
	(South Korea) Jo Su-Huk	GK	(South Korea) FC Seoul	Transfer	Winter			
	(South Korea) Kim Chang-Hoon	DF	(South Korea) Daejeon Citizen	Transfer	Winter		Trade	Traded for Kim Han-Seob
	(Brazil) Thiago	FW	(Brazil) Ferroviária	Transfer	Winter			
	(Brazil) Francis	MF	(Brazil) Penapolense	Transfer	Winter			
	(South Korea) Kang Yong	DF	(South Korea) Daegu	Contract ended	Winter		Free	
	(South Korea) Kim Kyo-Bin	GK	(South Korea) Daegu	Contract ended	Winter		Free	
	(South Korea) Lee Chun-Soo	FW	Unattached	Free agent	Winter		Free	
	(South Korea) Park Jisu	DF	Youth team	Promotion	Winter		Free	
	(South Korea) Yoon Pyung-Guk	GK	(South Korea) Incheon University	Draft	Winter		Free	
	(South Korea) Cho Kyum-Son	DF	(South Korea) Incheon University	Draft	Winter		Free	
	(South Korea) Jeon Hyung-Seop	DF	(South Korea) Sungkyunkwan University	Draft	Winter		Free	
	(South Korea) Kang Young-Yeon	DF	(South Korea) Soongsil University	Draft	Winter		Free	
	(South Korea) Kim Kyung-Min	DF	(South Korea) Yonsei University	Draft	Winter		Free	
	(South Korea) Lee Dae-Myung	MF	(South Korea) Hongik University	Draft	Winter		Free	
	(South Korea) Lee Seok-Hyun	MF	(South Korea) Sunmoon University	Draft	Winter		Free	

=== Out ===
#	Name	POS	Moving to	Mode	Window	Period	Fee	Notes
8	(South Korea) Jeong Hyuk	MF	(South Korea) Jeonbuk Motors	Transfer	Winter		Undisclosed	
20	(South Korea) Jung In-Hwan	DF	(South Korea) Jeonbuk Motors	Transfer	Winter		₩200m	
29	(South Korea) Lee Kyu-Ro	DF	(South Korea) Jeonbuk Motors	Transfer	Winter		Undisclosed	
15	(South Korea) Yoon Jun-Ha	FW	(South Korea) Daejeon Citizen	Contract terminated	Winter			
33	(South Korea) Park Tae-Soo	DF	(South Korea) Daejeon Citizen	Transfer	Winter			
6	(South Korea) Kim Han-Seob	DF	(South Korea) Daejeon Citizen	Transfer	Winter		Trade	Traded for Kim Chang-Hoon
19	(South Korea) Park Jun-Tae	FW	(South Korea) Chunnam Dragons	Transfer	Winter		Trade	Included in An Jae-Jun and Han Jae-Woong transfers
	(South Korea) Kim Min-Soo	FW	(South Korea) Gyeongnam	Contract terminated	Winter		Free	
77	(Albania) Sokol Cikalleshi	MF	(Albania) Besa Kavajë	Loan return	Winter		Free	
26	(South Korea) Joo Hyun-Jae	DF	(South Korea) Anyang	Contract terminated	Winter		Free	
	(South Korea) Han Jae-Woong	FW	(Thailand) Buriram United	Transfer	Winter			
38	(South Korea) Kim Jae-Yeon	MF	(South Korea) Suwon City	Contract terminated	Winter		Free	
41	(South Korea) Kim Jung-In	GK	(South Korea) Busan TC	Contract ended	Winter		Free	
46	(South Korea) Kim Young-In	MF	(South Korea) Seoul United	Contract ended	Winter		Free	
35	(South Korea) Yoo Jun-Soo	FW	(South Korea) Gyeongju KHNP	Contract terminated	Winter		Free	
14	(South Korea) Ahn Jae-Gon	MF	(South Korea) Incheon Korail	Contract ended	Winter		Free	
28	(South Korea) Nam Il-Woo	MF	(Japan) Giravanz Kitakyushu	Transfer	Winter			
21	(South Korea) Yoo Hyun	GK	(South Korea) Police	Loan	Winter		Free	
31	(South Korea) Baek Sun-Kyu	GK	(South Korea) Gangneung City	Contract ended	Winter		Free	
34	(South Korea) Lee Joon-Ho	MF	(South Korea) Gangneung City	Contract terminated	Winter		Free	
7	(Brazil) Ivo	MF	(Brazil) Criciúma	Transfer	Winter			
10	(Brazil) Paulo	MF		Contract terminated	Winter			

== Coaching staff ==
=== Senior coaching staff ===
Position	Name
Manager	(South Korea) Kim Bong-Gil
Assistant manager	(South Korea) Yoo Dongwoo
Goalkeeper coach	(South Korea) Kim Hyun-Tae
Coach	(South Korea) Myung Jinyoung
Physical Coach	(Brazil) Wanderley
Scout	(South Korea) Shin Jinwon
Trainer	(South Korea) Lee Seungjae (South Korea) Kim Dowan (South Korea) Lee Dongwon

=== Youth coaching staff ===
Position	Name
U-18 Head Coach	(South Korea) Shin Sung-Hwan
U-18 Goalkeeper Coach	(South Korea) Kim Lee-Sub
U-15 Head Coach	(South Korea) Woo Sung-Yong
U-15 Goalkeeper Coach	(South Korea) Yoon Jinho
U-15 Coach	(South Korea) Lee Seonggyu
U-12	(South Korea) Kim Taejong

== Match results ==
=== K-League ===
All times are Korea Standard Time (KST) – UTC+9

Date Round	Home	Score	Away	Location

3 March 1	Incheon	0 – 0	Gyeongnam	Nam District, Incheon
14:00	Kim Nam-Il (yellow card) 22'; Koo Bon-Sang (yellow card) 58'	Report	Kim Yong-Chan (yellow card) 28'; Jung Dae-Sun (yellow card) 82'	Stadium: Sungui Arena; Attendance: 14,901; Referee: Kim Sungho

9 March 2	Seoul	2 – 3	Incheon	Mapo District, Seoul
14:00	Molina (yellow card) 10'; Adi 28'; Escudero (yellow card) 44'; Park Hee-Seong 68'	Report	Kim Nam-Il (yellow card) 5'; Koo Bon-Sang (yellow card) 26'; Lee Seok-Hyun 35'; Diogo 51'; An Jae-Jun (yellow card) 76'; Moon Sang-Yoon 78'; Han Kyo-Won (yellow card) 89'	Stadium: Sangam; Attendance: 16,163; Referee: Lee Minhu

16 March 3	Seongnam	1 – 3	Incheon	Seongnam, Gyeonggi Province
16:00	Sim Woo-Yeon (yellow card) 29'; Lee Yo-Han (yellow card) 42'; Kim Pyung-Rae (yellow card) 52'; Kim Dong-Sub (yellow card) 76'; Djeparov 90' (pen.)	Report	Han Kyo-Won 39'; Diogo (yellow card) 43' (goal) 65'; Lee Seok-Hyun 58'; Kim Chang-Hoon (yellow card) 76'	Stadium: Tancheon Sports Complex; Attendance: 2,292; Referee: Choi Myungyong

31 March 4	Incheon	1 – 2	Daejeon	Nam District, Incheon
16:00	Koo Bon-Sang (yellow card) 34'; An Jae-Jun 48'; Lee Seok-Hyun (yellow card) 69'; Kim Nam-Il (yellow card) 70'	Report	Lee Woong-Hee 43'; Kim Jong-Soo (yellow card) 50'; Jeong Seok-Min (yellow card) 50'; João Paulo 52'; Lúcio Flávio (yellow card) 63'; Han Deok-Hee (yellow card) 84'	Stadium: Sungui Arena; Attendance: 10,103; Referee: Kim Sangwoo

31 March 5	Pohang	1 – 1	Incheon	Pohang, North Gyeongsang Province
16:00	Lee Myung-Joo (yellow card) 45'; Ko Mu-Yeol (yellow card) 47'; Hwang Jin-Sung 76' (pen.); No Byung-Jun (yellow card) 89'	Report	Lee Yun-Pyo (yellow card) 37'; Son Dae-Ho 73'	Stadium: Steel Yard; Attendance: 5,433; Referee: Kim Wantae

13 April 6	Daegu	1 – 3	Incheon	Suseong District, Daegu
15:00	Lee Jin-Ho (yellow card) 33'; Lee Yoon-Pyo 73' (o.g.); An Sang-Hyun (yellow card) 85'	Report	Lee Seok-Hyun 20' (pen.); Han Kyo-Won 39'; An Jae-Jun 55'; Park Tae-Min (yellow card) 69'	Stadium: Daegu Stadium; Attendance: 9,893; Referee: Lee Minhu

16 April 7	Incheon	0 – 0	Chunnam	Nam District, Incheon
19:30	Diogo (yellow card) 67'; Koo Bon-Sang (yellow card) 82'	Report	Lee Seung-Hee (yellow card) 24'; Kim Dong-Chul (yellow card) 66'; Shim Dong-Woon (yellow card) 82'; Kim Young-Wook (yellow card)	Stadium: Sungui Arena; Attendance: 5,631; Referee: Choi Myungyong

20 April 8	Incheon	3 – 1	Jeonbuk	Nam District, Incheon
16:00	An Jae-Jun (yellow card) 30'; Han Kyo-Won (yellow card) 34'; Diogo 50' (pen.); Lee Hyo-Kyun 87', 90'	Report	Lee Seung-Gi 28'; Kwon Kyung-Won (yellow card) 47'; Jeong Hyuk (yellow card) 52'; Eninho (yellow card) 55'; Lee Jae-Myung (yellow card) 82'	Stadium: Sungui Arena; Attendance: 6,422; Referee: Kim Sungho

28 April 9	Ulsan	2 – 2	Incheon	Nam District, Ulsan
14:00	Kim Shin-Wook 61', 70' (yellow card); Masuda (yellow card) 85'; Lee Wan (yellow card) 89'	Report	Thiago 67'; Moon Sang-Yoon 84'	Stadium: Big Crown; Attendance: 4,304; Referee: Kim Dongjin

5 May 10	Suwon	1 – 0	Incheon	Suwon, Gyeonggi Province
14:00	Oh Jang-Eun (yellow card) 73'; Jong Tae-Se 80'	Report	Park Tae-Min (yellow card) 29'; Kim Chang-Hoon (yellow card) 60'; Kim Nam-Il (yellow card) 81'; An Jae-Jun (yellow card) 89'	Stadium: Big Bird; Attendance: 26,203; Referee: Lee Dongjun

12 May 11	Incheon	0 – 0	Jeju	Nam District, Incheon
14:00	Lee Yun-Pyo (yellow card) 38'; Kim Nam-Il (yellow card) 83'	Report	Lee Hyun-Jin (yellow card) 11'; Seo Dong-Hyeon (yellow card) 62'	Stadium: Sungui Arena; Attendance: 9,117; Referee: Yoo Seonho

19 May 12	Incheon	1 – 0	Gangwon	Nam District, Incheon
14:00	An Jae-Jun 41'; Kim Jae-Woong (yellow card) 52'; Kim Nam-Il (yellow card) 56'	Report	Lee Jun-Yeob (yellow card) 48'; Kim Jin-Hwan (yellow card) 81'	Stadium: Sungui Arena; Attendance: 7,758; Referee: Kim Sungho

25 May 13	Busan	0 – 3	Incheon	Yeonje District, Busan
16:00	Park Jong-Woo (yellow card) 73'; Fágner (yellow card) 89'; Lee Jung-Ho (yellow card) 90'	Report	Lee Chun-Soo 12'; Han Kyo-Won (yellow card) 17'; Lee Seok-Hyun 53'; Diogo 90+4' (yellow card)	Stadium: Busan Asiad Main Stadium; Attendance: 4,133; Referee: Kim Jonghyuk

26 June 14	Incheon	1 – 4	Seongnam	Nam District, Incheon
19:30	Nam Joon-Jae 28'; Lee Yun-Pyo (yellow card) 59'	Report	Kim Dong-Sub 5', 50'; Lim Chae-Min (yellow card) 18'; Park Jin-Po (yellow card) 53'; Kim Cheol-Ho 58'; Lee Seung-Ryul 75'	Stadium: Sungui Arena; Attendance: 6,063; Referee: Choi Myungyong

29 June 15	Incheon	2 – 1	Pohang	Nam District, Incheon
17:00	Kim Nam-Il (yellow card) 3'; Lee Seok-Hyun 27', 58'; Han Kyo-Won (yellow card) 61'; An Jae-Jun (yellow card)	Report	Hwang Jin-Sung 18'; Lee Myung-Joo (yellow card) 18'; Shin Kwang-Hoon (yellow card) 61'	Stadium: Sungui Arena; Attendance: 7,146; Referee: Kim Dongjin

6 July 16	Chunnam	1 – 1	Incheon	Gwangyang, South Jeolla Province
19:00	Park Sun-Yong (yellow card) 28'; Park Jun-Tae 82' (pen.); Lee Jong-Ho (yellow card)	Report	An Jae-Jun (yellow card) 2'; Han Kyo-Won 34'; Nam Joon-Jae (yellow card) 37'; Kim Nam-Il (yellow card) 69'; Lee Yun-Pyo (yellow card) 81'	Stadium: Dragon Dungeon; Attendance: 2,173; Referee: Song Minseok

13 July 17	Incheon	2 – 1	Daegu	Nam District, Incheon
19:30	Koo Bon-Sang (yellow card) 1'; Nam Joon-Jae 43'; Diogo 77' (pen.); Kang Yong (yellow card) 87'	Report	Leandrinho (yellow card) 18'; Song Chang-Ho 49' (yellow card) 84'; Lee Joon-Hee (yellow card) 71'; Lee Yang-Jong (yellow card) 74'	Stadium: Sungui Arena; Attendance: 4,328; Referee: Kim Heegon

16 July 18	Gyeongnam	1 – 0	Incheon	Changwon, South Gyeongsang Province
20:00	Bosančić 41' (pen.); Sretenović (yellow card) 44'; Kang Seung-Jo (yellow card) 61'	Report	Moon Sang-Yoon (yellow card) 78'; Lee Yoon-Pyo (yellow card) 87'; Park Tae-Min (yellow card) 90'	Stadium: Changwon Football Center; Attendance: 4,073; Referee: Choi Myungyong

21 July 19	Jeju	1 – 1	Incheon	Seogwipo, Jeju Province
19:00	Kang Su-Il (yellow card) 40'; Pedro 71' (pen.); Bae Il-Hwan (yellow card) 80'	Report	Kim Nam-Il (yellow card) 33'; Kwon Jung-Hyuk 39'; An Jae-Jun (yellow card) 64'; Lee Yoon-Pyo (yellow card) 65' (yellow-red card) 89'; Son Dae-Ho (yellow card)	Stadium: Wind Force; Attendance: 7,514; Referee: Song Minseok

31 July 20	Daejeon	0 – 1	Incheon	Yuseong District, Daejeon
19:30		Report	Seol Ki-Hyeon 17'; Son Dae-Ho (yellow card) 39'; Park Tae-Min (yellow card) 51'	Stadium: Purple Arena; Attendance: 5,086; Referee: Yoo Seonho

3 August 21	Incheon	2 – 2	Ulsan	Nam District, Incheon
19:30	Seol Ki-Hyeon 8'; Kim Nam-Il (yellow card) 16' (yellow-red card) 82'; Lee Yoon-Pyo (yellow card) 27'; Park Tae-Min 30'; Lee Chun-Soo (yellow card) 60'	Report	Masuda (yellow card) 44'; Kim Chi-Gon 51'; Rafinha 60'; Kim Young-Sam (yellow card)	Stadium: Sungui Arena; Attendance: 5,003; Referee: Kim Dongjin

10 August 22	Incheon	2 – 3	Seoul	Nam District, Incheon
19:30	Nam Joon-Jae (yellow card) 17'; Seol Ki-Hyeon 19'; Han Kyo-Won 50'	Report	Ko Myong-Jin 6'; Ha Dae-Sung 40' (yellow card) 88'; Damjanović 90+1'	Stadium: Sungui Arena; Attendance: 9,257; Referee: Choi Myungyong

18 August 23	Gangwon	1 – 2	Incheon	Gangneung, Gangwon Province
19:00	Kang Jung-Hun (yellow card) 6'; Kim Dong-Ki (yellow card) 34' (goal) 65'; Wesley (yellow card) 47'; Choi Woo-Jae (yellow card) 77'; Park Sang-Jin (yellow card); Bae Hyo-Sung (yellow card)	Report	Diogo 80' (pen.) (yellow card) 80'; Nam Joon-Jae 88'	Stadium: Gangneung Stadium; Attendance: 2,315; Referee: Kim Sangwoo

24 August 24	Incheon	0 – 1	Busan	Nam District, Incheon
19:30	Kim Nam-Il (yellow card) 30'; Nam Joon-Jae (yellow card) 50'; Lee Yun-Pyo (yellow card) 76'; Lee Chun-Soo (yellow card)	Report	Fagner 57' (pen.); Lee Kyung-Ryul (yellow card) 62'; William (yellow card)	Stadium: Sungui Arena; Attendance: 7,514; Referee: Lee Minhu

28 August 25	Incheon	3 – 1	Suwon	Nam District, Incheon
19:30	Lee Seok-Hyun 1'; Diogo 73'; An Jae-Jun (yellow card) 86'; Han Kyo-Won 90+3'	Report	Santos 66'; Choi Jae-Soo (yellow card) 86'	Stadium: Sungui Arena; Attendance: 6,106; Referee: Ryu Heeseon

1 September 26	Jeonbuk	2 – 0	Incheon	Jeonju, North Jeolla Province
19:00	Thiago 30'; Seo Sang-Min (yellow card) 56'; Oris 61'	Report		Stadium: Jeonju Castle; Attendance: 10,226; Referee: Choi Myungyong

8 September 27	Ulsan	2 – 1	Incheon	Nam District, Ulsan
17:00	Caíque 6'; Kim Shin-Wook 30'; Kang Min-Soo (yellow card) 90'	Report	Choi Jong-hoan (yellow card) 75'; Lee Yun-Pyo 90+1'	Stadium: Big Crown; Attendance: 5,123; Referee: Ko Hyungjin

11 September 28	Incheon	1 – 1	Jeonbuk	Nam District, Incheon
19:30	Han Kyo-Won (yellow card) 19'; Kim Jae-Woong 72'; Seol Ki-Hyeon (yellow card) 79'	Report	Oris 35'; Kwon Kyung-Won (yellow card) 70'; Jeon Hyuk (yellow card) 77'; Jeon Kwang-Hwan (yellow card) 82'	Stadium: Sungui Arena; Attendance: 1,902; Referee: Yoo Seonho

22 September 29	Suwon	1 – 1	Incheon	Suwon, Gyeonggi Province
14:00	Kwak Hee-Ju (yellow card) 1'; Santos 34'	Report	An Jae-Jun 41'; Diogo (yellow card) 71'	Stadium: Big Bird; Attendance: 17,537; Referee: Woo Sangil

28 September 30	Incheon	2 – 2	Pohang	Nam District, Incheon
16:00	Lee Chun-Soo 38'; Park Tae-Min 72'	Report	Lee Myung-Joo (yellow card) 28'; Park Hee-Chul (yellow card) 61'; Park Sung-Ho 76', 90+3'	Stadium: Sungui Arena; Attendance: 4,156; Referee: Lee Jongguk

6 October 31	Incheon	0 – 0	Seoul	Nam District, Incheon
16:00	Seol Ki-Hyeon (yellow card) 59'; Park Tae-Min (yellow card) 88'	Report	Ko Myong-Jin (yellow card) 22'	Stadium: Sungui Arena; Attendance: 15,595; Referee: Kim Jonghyuk

27 October 32	Busan	0 – 0	Incheon	Yeonje District, Busan
15:00	Kim Ik-Hyun (yellow card) 1'; Lee Jung-Ho (yellow card) 54'; Park Jong-Woo (yellow card) 60'	Report	Han Kyo-Won (yellow card) 87'	Stadium: Busan Asiad Main Stadium; Attendance: 2,015; Referee: Lee Jongguk

30 October 33	Pohang	2 – 1	Incheon	Pohang, North Gyeongsang Province
14:00	Kim Seung-Dae (yellow card) 34'; Ko Mu-Yeol 60'; Shin Kwang-Hoon (yellow card) 61'; Shin Young-Jun 87'	Report	Moon Sang-Yoon 46'; Choi Jong-hoan (yellow card) 63'; Lee Yoon-Pyo (yellow card) 66'	Stadium: Steel Yard; Attendance: 2,274; Referee: Woo Sangil

3 November 34	Incheon	0 – 1	Ulsan	Nam District, Incheon
16:00	Han Kyo-Won (yellow card) 44'; An Jae-Jun (yellow card) 54'	Report	Kim Yong-Tae 75'	Stadium: Sungui Arena; Attendance: 5,061; Referee: Ryu Heeseon

10 November 35	Incheon	1 – 2	Busan	Nam District, Incheon
16:00	Han Kyo-Won (yellow card) 4'; Seol Ki-Hyeon 51'	Report	Park Joon-Gang (yellow card); Jung Seok-Hwa (yellow card) 47'; Yang Dong-Hyun 82'; Han Ji-Ho 90+2'	Stadium: Sungui Arena; Attendance: 3,031; Referee: Yoo Seonho

17 November 36	Seoul	2 – 2	Incheon	Mapo District, Seoul
14:00	Choi Hyo-Jin (yellow card) 13'; Molina 44'; Escudero 90'	Report	Kim Tae-Yoon (yellow card) 5'; Han Kyo-Won 69'; Park Tae-Min 73'; Kwon Jung-Hyuk (yellow card) 85'	Stadium: Sangam; Attendance: 13,424; Referee: Lee Jongguk

11 November 37	Jeonbuk	2 – 0	Incheon	Jeonju, North Jeolla Province
16:00	Jeong Hyuk 54'; Lee Dong-Gook 64'; Seo Sang-Min (yellow card) 70'; Kim Shin-young (yellow card)	Report	Koo Bon-Sang (yellow card); Diogo (yellow card) 89'; Park Tae-Min (yellow card) 90'	Stadium: Jeonju Castle; Attendance: 6,302; Referee: Choi Myungyong

1 December 25	Incheon	2 – 1	Suwon	Nam District, Incheon
14:00	Nam Joon-Jae 20'; Jeon Jun-Hyung (yellow card); Kim Tae-Yoon (yellow card); Kim Nam-Il (yellow card); Lee Hyo-Kyun 90+3'	Report	Santos 74'	Stadium: Sungui Arena; Attendance: 5,378; Referee: Kim Sungho

==== League table ====
Pos	Team	Pld	W	D	L	GF	GA	GD	Pts
5	Suwon Samsung Bluewings	38	15	8	15	50	43	+7	53
6	Busan IPark	38	14	10	14	43	41	+2	52
7	Incheon United	38	12	14	12	48	46	+2	50
8	Seongnam Ilhwa Chunma	38	17	9	12	51	42	+9	60
9	Jeju United	38	16	10	12	51	46	+5	58

Source: K League
Rules for classification: 1) Points; 2) Goal difference; 3) Goals scored

==== Results summary ====
Overall								Home						Away					
Pld	W	D	L	GF	GA	GD	Pts	W	D	L	GF	GA	GD	W	D	L	GF	GA	GD
38	12	14	12	48	45	+3	50	6	7	6	23	22	+1	6	7	6	25	23	+2

==== Results by round ====
Round	1	2	3	4	5	6	7	8	9	10	11	12	13	14	15	16	17	18	19	20	21	22	23	24	25	26	27	28	29	30	31	32	33	34	35	36	37	38
Ground	H	A	A	H	A	A	H	H	A	A	H	H	A	H	H	A	H	A	A	A	H	H	A	H	H	A	A	H	A	H	H	A	A	H	H	A	A	H
Result	D	W	W	L	D	W	D	W	D	L	D	W	W	L	W	D	W	L	D	W	D	L	W	L	W	L	L	D	D	D	D	D	L	L	L	D	L	W
Position	9	4	3	5	5	4	5	3	2	5	6	4	3	4	3	3	4	3	4	4	5	6	5	6	5	6	6	6	6	6	6	6	6	6	6	7	7	7

Updated to match(es) played on 1 December 2013. Source: League Fixtures and Results
A = Away; H = Home; W = Win; D = Draw; L = Loss

=== Korean FA Cup ===
8 May Round of 32	Incheon	4 – 1	Jeonbuk Maeil	Nam District, Incheon
19:30	Nam Joon-Jae 40'; Seol Ki-Hyeon 58'; Francis 86'; Lee Hyo-Kyun 90+2'		Kim Hae-Su 88'	Stadium: Sungui Arena; Attendance: 1,056

10 July Round of 16	Incheon	2 – 1 (a.e.t.)	Sangmu	Nam District, Incheon
19:30	Thiago 48'; Nam Joon-Jae 107'		Ha Tae-Goon 72'	Stadium: Sungui Arena

7 August Quarterfinals	Jeju	2 – 0	Incheon	Seogwipo, Jeju Province
19:00	Bae Il-Hwan 29'; Yoon Bit-Garam 75'			Stadium: Wind Force

== Squad statistics ==
=== Appearances ===
Statistics accurate as of match played 27 June 2012

No.	Nat.	Pos.	Name	League		FA Cup		Appearances		Goals
No.	Nat.	Pos.	Name	Apps	Goals	Apps	Goals	App (sub)	Total	Goals
1	(South Korea)	GK	Kwon Jung-Hyuk	38	1	2	0	40 (0)	40	1
2	(South Korea)	DF	Park Ji-Su	0	0	0	0	0	0	0
3	(South Korea)	DF	Jeon Jun-Hyung	6 (2)	0	1	0	7 (2)	9	0
4	(South Korea)	DF	Kim Tae-Yoon	10 (5)	0	1	0	11 (5)	16	0
5	(South Korea)	MF	Kim Nam-Il	25	0	1	0	26 (0)	26	0
6	(South Korea)	MF	Son Dae-Ho	12 (11)	1	1	0	13 (11)	24	1
7	(South Korea)	FW	Nam Joon-Jae	25 (7)	4	1 (1)	2	26 (8)	34	6
8	(South Korea)	FW	Kim Jae-Woong	4 (3)	1	1	0	5 (3)	8	1
9	(South Korea)	FW	Seol Ki-Hyeon	21 (5)	4	1	1	22 (5)	27	5
10	(South Korea)	FW	Lee Chun-Soo	15 (4)	2	0 (1)	0	15 (5)	20	2
11	(Brazil)	FW	Thiago	1 (18)	1	1	1	2 (18)	20	2
13	(South Korea)	DF	Park Tae-Min	36	3	1	0	37 (0)	37	3
14	(South Korea)	DF	Kim Chang-Hoon	14	0	1	0	15 (0)	15	0
15	(South Korea)	FW	Jin Sung-Wook	0	0	0	0	0	0	0
16	(South Korea)	DF	Lee Yoon-Pyo	30	1	1	0	31 (0)	31	1
17	(South Korea)	MF	Moon Sang-Yoon	15 (14)	3	2	0	17 (14)	31	3
18	(South Korea)	DF	Han Jae-Woong	0 (3)	0	0	0	0 (3)	3	0
19	(Brazil)	FW	Diogo	18 (14)	7	0	0	18 (14)	32	7
20	(South Korea)	DF	An Jae-Jun	31	4	1	0	32 (0)	32	4
21	(South Korea)	GK	Jo Su-Huk	0	0	0	0	0	0	0
22	(South Korea)	DF	Yoo Jae-Ho	0 (3)	0	0	0	0 (3)	3	0
23	(South Korea)	MF	Lee Seok-Hyun	29 (4)	7	1 (1)	0	30 (5)	35	7
24	(South Korea)	MF	Koo Bon-Sang	28 (2)	0	0	0	28 (2)	30	0
25	(South Korea)	MF	Choi Jong-hoan	21	0	2	0	23 (0)	23	0
26	(South Korea)	MF	Jeon Hyung-Seop	0	0	0	0	0	0	0
27	(South Korea)	FW	Han Kyo-Won	36	6	1 (1)	0	37 (1)	38	6
28	(South Korea)	FW	Lee Hyo-Kyun	0 (13)	3	2	1	2 (13)	15	4
29	(South Korea)	MF	Lee Dae-Myung	0	0	0	0	0	0	0
30	(South Korea)	DF	Kim Kyung-Min	0	0	0	0	0	0	0
31	(South Korea)	GK	Kim Kyo-Bin	0	0	0	0	0	0	0
32	(South Korea)	DF	Kim Joo-Bin	0	0	0	0	0	0	0
34	(Australia)	DF	Nathan Burns	0	0	0	0	0	0	0
35	(South Korea)	DF	Kang Young-Yeon	0	0	0	0	0	0	0
36	(South Korea)	DF	Cho Kyum-Son	0	0	0	0	0	0	0
37	(South Korea)	DF	Kang Yong	3 (1)	0	0	0	3 (1)	4	0
41	(South Korea)	GK	Yoon Pyung-Guk	0	0	0	0	0	0	0
18	(Brazil)	FW	Francis	0	0	0	1	0	0	1

=== Goals ===
No.	Nation	Position	Name	K-League	KFA Cup	Total
23	(South Korea)	MF	Lee Seok-Hyun	7	0	7
19	(Brazil)	FW	Diogo	7	0	7
27	(South Korea)	FW	Han Kyo-Won	6	0	6
7	(South Korea)	FW	Nam Joon-Jae	4	2	6
9	(South Korea)	FW	Seol Ki-Hyeon	4	1	5
20	(South Korea)	DF	An Jae-Jun	4	0	4
28	(South Korea)	FW	Lee Hyo-Kyun	3	1	4
17	(South Korea)	MF	Moon Sang-Yoon	3	0	3
13	(South Korea)	DF	Park Tae-Min	3	0	3
10	(South Korea)	FW	Lee Chun-Soo	2	0	2
11	(Brazil)	FW	Thiago	1	1	2
1	(South Korea)	GK	Kwon Jung-Hyuk	1	0	1
6	(South Korea)	MF	Son Dae-Ho	1	0	1
8	(South Korea)	FW	Kim Jae-Woong	1	0	1
16	(South Korea)	DF	Lee Yun-Pyo	1	0	1
18	(Brazil)	MF	Francis	0	1	1
/	/	/	Own Goals	0	0	0
/	/	/	TOTALS	48	6	54

=== Assists ===
No.	Nation	Position	Name	K-League	KFA Cup	Total
10	(South Korea)	FW	Lee Chun-Soo	5	0	5
9	(South Korea)	FW	Seol Ki-Hyeon	4	0	4
11	(Brazil)	FW	Thiago	3	0	3
23	(South Korea)	MF	Lee Seok-Hyun	3	0	3
19	(Brazil)	FW	Diogo	2	0	2
27	(South Korea)	FW	Han Kyo-Won	2	0	2
14	(South Korea)	DF	Kim Chang-Hoon	2	0	2
25	(South Korea)	MF	Choi Jong-hoan	2	0	2
6	(South Korea)	MF	Son Dae-Ho	2	0	2
17	(South Korea)	MF	Moon Sang-Yoon	2	0	2
7	(South Korea)	FW	Nam Joon-Jae	1	1	2
16	(South Korea)	DF	Lee Yoon-Pyo	1	0	1
24	(South Korea)	MF	Koo Bon-Sang	1	0	1
18	(South Korea)	MF	Francis	0	1	1
/	/	/	TOTALS	30	2	32

=== Discipline ===
No.	Nation	Position	Name	K-League			KFA Cup			Total		
No.	Nation	Position	Name	Booked	(yellow card) (yellow-red card)	Sent off (straight red)	Booked	(yellow card) (yellow-red card)	Sent off (straight red)	Booked	(yellow card) (yellow-red card)	Sent off (straight red)
1	(South Korea)	GK	Kwon Jung-Hyuk	1	0	0	0	0	0	1	0	0
3	(South Korea)	DF	Jeon Jun-Hyung	1	0	0	0	0	0	1	0	0
4	(South Korea)	DF	Kim Tae-Yoon	2	0	0	0	0	0	2	0	0
5	(South Korea)	MF	Kim Nam-Il	13	1	0	0	0	0	13	1	0
6	(South Korea)	MF	Son Dae-Ho	2	0	0	0	0	0	2	0	0
7	(South Korea)	FW	Nam Joon-Jae	3	0	0	0	0	0	3	0	0
8	(South Korea)	FW	Kim Jae-Woong	1	0	0	0	0	0	1	0	0
9	(South Korea)	FW	Seol Ki-Hyeon	2	0	0	0	0	0	2	0	0
10	(South Korea)	FW	Lee Chun-Soo	1	0	0	0	0	0	1	0	0
13	(South Korea)	DF	Park Tae-Min	6	0	0	0	0	0	6	0	0
14	(South Korea)	DF	Kim Chang-Hoon	2	0	0	0	0	0	2	0	0
16	(South Korea)	DF	Lee Yoon-Pyo	10	1	0	0	0	0	10	1	0
17	(South Korea)	MF	Moon Sang-Yoon	1	0	0	0	0	0	1	0	0
19	(Brazil)	FW	Diogo	6	0	0	0	0	0	6	0	0
20	(South Korea)	DF	An Jae-Jun	8	0	0	0	0	0	8	0	0
23	(South Korea)	MF	Lee Seok-Hyun	1	0	0	0	0	0	1	0	0
24	(South Korea)	MF	Koo Bon-Sang	6	0	0	0	0	0	6	0	0
25	(South Korea)	MF	Choi Jong-hoan	2	0	0	0	0	0	2	0	0
27	(South Korea)	FW	Han Kyo-Won	8	0	0	0	0	0	8	0	0
37	(South Korea)	DF	Kang Yong	1	0	0	0	0	0	1	0	0
/	/	/	TOTALS	77	2	0	0	0	0	77	2	0
