= 2012 Incheon United FC season =

Incheon United F.C.
2012 season
- Chairman: Song Young-Gil
- Manager: Huh Jung-Moo (until 11 April 2012); Kim Bong-Gil (since 13 April 2012)
- K-League: 10th
- Korean FA Cup: Round of 16
- Top goalscorer: League: Seol Ki-Hyeon (5); All: Seol Ki-Hyeon (6)
- Highest home attendance: 17,662 vs Suwon (March 11)
- Lowest home attendance: 1,434 vs Gwangju (April 11)
- Average home league attendance: 4,968 (as of May 19)
Home colours	Away colours

The 2012 season was Incheon United's ninth season in the K-League in South Korea. Incheon United will be competing in K-League and Korean FA Cup.

== Current squad ==
Note: Flags indicate national team as defined under FIFA eligibility rules; some limited exceptions apply. Players may hold more than one non-FIFA nationality.

No.	Pos.	Nation	Player
1	GK	KOR	Kwon Jung-Hyuk
2	DF	KOR	Jeon Jun-Hyung
3	DF	KOR	Jang Won-Seok
4	DF	KOR	Kim Tae-Yoon
5	MF	KOR	Kim Nam-Il
6	DF	KOR	Kim Han-Seob
7	MF	BRA	Ivo
8	MF	KOR	Jeong Hyuk
9	FW	KOR	Seol Ki-Hyeon
11	FW	AUS	Nathan Burns
13	DF	KOR	Park Tae-Min
14	MF	KOR	Ahn Jae-Gon
15	FW	KOR	Yoon Jun-Ha
16	DF	KOR	Lee Yoon-Pyo
17	MF	KOR	Moon Sang-Yoon
18	FW	KOR	Lee Hyo-Kyun
19	FW	KOR	Park Jun-Tae
20	DF	KOR	Jung In-Hwan
21	GK	KOR	Yoo Hyun
22	MF	BRA	Nando
23	MF	KOR	Choi Jong-hoan
24	MF	KOR	Koo Bon-Sang
25	MF	KOR	Son Dae-Ho

No.	Pos.	Nation	Player
26	MF	KOR	Joo Hyun-Jae
27	FW	KOR	Han Kyo-Won
28	MF	KOR	Nam Il-Woo
29	DF	KOR	Lee Kyu-Ro
30	FW	KOR	Jin Sung-Wook
31	GK	KOR	Baek Sun-Kyu
32	DF	KOR	Kim Joo-Bin
33	DF	KOR	Park Tae-Soo
34	DF	KOR	Lee Joon-Ho
35	FW	KOR	Yoo Jun-Soo
36	FW	KOR	Kim Jae-Woong
37	FW	KOR	Shin Dong-Hyuk
38	MF	KOR	Kim Jae-Yeon
39	DF	KOR	Kim Tae-Eun
40	DF	KOR	Hong Sun-Man
41	GK	KOR	Kim Jung-In
42	DF	KOR	Yoo Jae-Ho
43	DF	KOR	Jung Jae-Yoon
44	MF	KOR	Jung Soo-Woon
45	MF	KOR	Cho Sung-Tae
46	DF	KOR	Kim Young-In
47	MF	KOR	Seo Young-Won

=== Out on loan ===
Note: Flags indicate national team as defined under FIFA eligibility rules; some limited exceptions apply. Players may hold more than one non-FIFA nationality.

No.	Pos.	Nation	Player
—	FW	KOR	Kim Min-Soo (to Sangju Sangmu Phoenix)
—	FW	KOR	Kim Myung-Woon (to Sangju Sangmu Phoenix)

== Transfer ==
=== In ===
No.	Pos.	Nation	Player
—	GK	KOR	Yoo Hyun (from Gangwon FC)
—	MF	KOR	Son Dae-Ho (return from military duty)
—	FW	KOR	Yoon Jun-Ha (Free agent, former Gangwon FC)
—	DF	KOR	Park Tae-Min (Free agent, former Busan I'Park)
—	FW	KOR	Lee Hyo-Kyun (Free agent, former Gyeongnam FC)
—	MF	BRA	Ivo (from (Brazil) Portuguesa)
—	DF	KOR	Kim Tae-Yoon (Free agent, former Seongnam Ilhwa Chunma)
—	MF	KOR	Choi Jong-hoan (from FC Seoul)
—	FW	KOR	Seol Ki-Hyeon (Free agent, former Ulsan Hyundai)
—	MF	KOR	Kim Nam-Il (Free agent, former (Russia) Tom Tomsk)
—	FW	AUS	Nathan Burns (Free agent, former (Greece) AEK Athens)
—	MF	BRA	Ferdinando (from (Brazil) Portuguesa)
—	MF	KOR	Lee Kyu-Ro (from FC Seoul)

No.	Pos.	Nation	Player
—	DF	KOR	Kim Joo-Bin (drafted)
—	DF	KOR	Lee Joon-Ho (drafted)
—	MF	KOR	Koo Bon-Sang (drafted)
—	MF	KOR	Kim Jae-Yeon (drafted)
—	MF	KOR	Nam Il-Woo (drafted)
—	DF	KOR	Hong Sun-Man (drafted)
—	DF	KOR	Jung Jae-Yoon (drafted)
—	DF	KOR	Kim Young-In (drafted)
—	MF	KOR	Moon Sang-Yoon (drafted)
—	FW	KOR	Jin Sung-Wook (drafted)
—	DF	KOR	Yoo Jae-Ho (drafted)
—	FW	KOR	Jung Soo-Woon (drafted)
—	MF	KOR	Cho Sung-Tae (drafted)
—	GK	KOR	Kim Jung-In (drafted)

=== Out ===
No.	Pos.	Nation	Player
4	DF	KOR	Kim Sun-Woo (released)
5	MF	BRA	Fábio Bahia (contract terminated, to (Brazil) Guarani)
6	DF	KOR	Bae Hyo-Sung (to Gangwon FC)
7	MF	KOR	Lee Jae-Kwon (to FC Seoul)
9	FW	KOR	Kim Myung-Woon (to Sangju Sangmu Phoenix, army)
10	FW	BRA	Almir (contract terminated, to (Brazil) Cabofriense)
11	FW	BRA	Elionar (released, to (Brazil) Comercial-SP)
13	MF	KOR	Lee Jong-hyun (contract terminated)
17	MF	KOR	Jeon Jae-Ho (to Busan I'Park)
18	MF	UZB	Timur Kapadze (contract terminated, to (United Arab Emirates) Al Sharjah)
19	MF	KOR	Kim Seung-Ho (to Mokpo City FC)
23	FW	KOR	Kwon Hyuk-Jin (to National Police Agency FC, army)
25	GK	KOR	Song Yoo-Geol (to Gangwon FC)
29	MF	KOR	Cho Bum-Seok (contract terminated, to Mokpo City FC)

No.	Pos.	Nation	Player
30	GK	KOR	Yoon Jin-Ho (contract terminated)
32	DF	KOR	Jang Kyung-Jin (contract terminated, to Gwangju FC)
34	DF	KOR	Ahn Tae-Eun (released)
35	FW	KOR	Jeong Sun-Bi (contract terminated, to Cheonan City FC)
36	MF	KOR	Lee Ho-Chang (contract terminated)
37	MF	KOR	Park Kyung-Soon (contract terminated)
40	MF	KOR	Park Ho-Yong (contract terminated)
41	DF	KOR	Cho Kwang-Hoon (contract terminated)
42	MF	KOR	Joo Ki-Ho (contract terminated, to Busan Transportation Corporation)
45	MF	KOR	Ji Kyeong-Deuk (released, to Daejeon Citizen)
46	DF	KOR	Lee Won-Yong (released)
48	DF	KOR	Lim Joong-Yong (retired)
49	FW	KOR	Kim Hyun-Min (contract terminated)

== Coaching staff ==
Position	Staff
Manager	(South Korea) Huh Jung-Moo
Assistant Manager	(South Korea) Kim Bong-Gil
GK Coach	(South Korea) Kim Hyun-Tae
Coach	(South Korea) Yoo Dong-Woo
Coach	(South Korea) Myung Jin-Young
Physical Coach	(Brazil) Wanderley

Last updated: 27 March 2012
Source: Incheon United

== Match results ==
=== K-League ===
All times are Korea Standard Time (KST) – UTC+9

Date Round	Home	Score	Away	Location

4 March 1	Jeju	3–1	Incheon	Seogwipo, Jeju
15:00	Bae Il-Hwan 29'; Santos 67'; Jair 75'	Report	Koo Bon-Sang (yellow card) 52' (yellow-red card) 65'; Kim Tae-Yoon 89'	Stadium: Jeju World Cup Stadium; Attendance: 6,202; Referee: Lee Min-Hu

11 March 2	Incheon	0–2	Suwon	Nam-gu, Incheon
14:00		Report	Radončić 29', 78' (pen.)	Stadium: Incheon Football Stadium; Attendance: 17,662; Referee: Choi Myung-Yong

18 March 3	Daegu	1–0	Incheon	Suseong-gu, Daegu
15:00	Lee Jin-Ho 34'	Report		Stadium: Daegu Stadium; Attendance: 6,303; Referee: Lee Jong-Guk

24 March 4	Incheon	2–1	Daejeon	Nam-gu, Incheon
17:00	Seol Ki-Hyeon 53' (Assist by No.5); Seol Ki-Hyeon 61' (pen.)	Report	Heo Beom-San 66'	Stadium: Incheon Football Stadium; Attendance: 2,053; Referee: Yoo Sun-Ho

1 April 5	Incheon	0–0	Gyeongnam	Nam-gu, Incheon
15:00		Report	Lee Yong-Gi (red card) 60'	Stadium: Incheon Football Stadium; Attendance: 2,538; Referee: Kim Sung-Ho

7 April 6	Gangwon	2–1	Incheon	Gangneung, Gangwon
15:00	Kim Eun-Jung 19' (pen.), 79'	Report	Seol Ki-Hyeon 46'	Stadium: Gangneung Stadium; Attendance: 3,266; Referee: Hong Jin-Ho

11 April 7	Incheon	1–1	Gwangju	Nam-gu, Incheon
15:00	Choi Jong-hoan 17' (Assist by No.9)	Report	Kim Eun-sun 39'	Stadium: Incheon Football Stadium; Attendance: 1,989; Referee: Moon Jin-Hee

15 April 8	Sangju	1–0	Incheon	Sangju, Gyeongbuk
15:00	Kim Jae-Sung 31'	Report		Stadium: Sangju Civic Stadium; Attendance: 2,533; Referee: Lee Dong-Jun

22 April 9	Incheon	0–1	Ulsan	Nam-gu, Incheon
15:00		Report	Maranhão 90+3'	Stadium: Incheon Football Stadium; Attendance: 1,434; Referee: Lee Min-Hu

29 April 10	Chunnam	0–0	Incheon	Gwangyang, Jeonnam
15:00	Lee Jong-Ho (red card) 15'	Report	Jeong Hyuk (yellow card) 45+2' (yellow-red card) 90'	Stadium: Gwangyang Football Stadium; Attendance: 3,126; Referee: Mae Ho-Young

5 May 11	Incheon	3–3	Jeonbuk	Nam-gu, Incheon
15:00	Moon Sang-Yoon 3' (Free kick); Park Jun-Tae 38'; Seol Ki-Hyeon 80' (Assist by No.17)	Report	Eninho 15', 89'; Lee Dong-Gook 90+2'	Stadium: Incheon Football Stadium; Attendance: 6,742; Referee: Kim Dong-Jin

11 May 12	Seongnam	1–0	Incheon	Seongnam, Gyeonggi
19:30	Han Sang-Woon 88'	Report		Stadium: Tancheon Sports Complex; Attendance: 3,480; Referee: Kim Jong-Hyuk

19 May 13	Incheon	0–0	Busan	Nam-gu, Incheon
15:00		Report		Stadium: Incheon Football Stadium; Attendance: 2,361; Referee: Kim Sang-Woo

28 May 14	Seoul	3–1	Incheon	Mapo-gu, Seoul
15:00	Molina 26'; Damjanović 36' (pen.), 89'	Report	Jeong Hyuk 73' (Assist by No.13)	Stadium: Seoul World Cup Stadium; Attendance: 31,156; Referee: Choi Myung-Yong

14 June 15	Incheon	1–1	Pohang	Nam-gu, Incheon
19:30	Jung In-Hwan 29' (Assist by No.8)	Report	Kim Won-Il 90+3'	Stadium: Incheon Football Stadium; Attendance: 82^{[1]} Referee: Kim Wan-Tae

17 June 16	Gwangju	0–0	Incheon	Seo-gu, Gwangju
19:00		Report		Stadium: Gwangju World Cup Stadium; Attendance: 2,416; Referee: Ko Hyung-Jin

23 June 17	Incheon	1–0	Sangju	Nam-gu, Incheon
19:00	Seol Ki-Hyeon 90+3' (Assist by No.29)	Report		Stadium: Incheon Football Stadium; Attendance: 2,755; Referee: Lee Jong-Guk

27 June 18	Incheon	0–0	Seongnam	Nam-gu, Incheon
19:30		Report		Stadium: Incheon Football Stadium; Attendance: 1,438; Referee: Moon Jin-Hee

30 June 19	Gyeongnam	0–0	Incheon	Changwon, Gyeongnam
17:00		Report(Kor); Report(Eng)	Kim Nam-Il (yellow card) 23'; Lee Yoon-Pyo (yellow card) 44'; Han Kyo-Won (yellow card) 79'	Stadium: Changwon Football Center; Attendance: 2,122; Referee: Ko Keum-Bok

8 July 20	Busan	1–2	Incheon	Yeonje-gu, Busan
19:00	Kim Han-Yoon (yellow card) 62'; Yoon Dong-Min 77'	Report(Kor) Report(Eng)	Lee Yun-Pyo (yellow card) 39'; Lee Kyu-Ro (yellow card) 48'; Han Kyo-Won 57'; Jung In-Hwan 89'	Stadium: Busan Asiad Stadium; Attendance: 3,278; Referee: Lee Min-Hu

15 July 21	Incheon	3–2	Seoul	Nam-gu, Incheon
19:00	Han Kyo-Won 45+1', 62'; Yoo Hyun (yellow card) 81'; Paulo 90+1'	Report(Kor); Report(Eng)	Kim Jin-Kyu 33'; Ha Dae-Sung 67'	Stadium: Incheon Football Stadium; Attendance: 5,154; Referee: Kim Jong-Hyeok

22 July 22	Pohang	2–1	Incheon	Pohang, Gyeongbuk
19:00	Shin Hyung-Min 62' (pen.); Kim Sun-Woo (yellow card) 88'; No Byung-Jun 89'	Report(Kor); Report(Eng)	Nam Joon-Jae 11', (yellow card) 55'; Lee Yun-Pyo (yellow card) 60'	Stadium: Pohang Steel Yard; Attendance: 13,045; Referee: Kim Sung-Ho

26 July 23	Incheon	1–0	Daegu	Nam-gu, Incheon
19:30	Nam Joon-Jae (yellow card) 11'; Kim Nam-Il (yellow card) 27'; Lee Yun-Pyo (yellow card) 53'; Ivo 66'	Report(Kor); Report(Eng)	Yoo Kyoung-Youl (yellow card) 3'; Song Je-Heon (yellow card) 30'; Lee Joon-Hee (yellow card) 41'; Matheus (yellow card) 43'	Stadium: Incheon Football Stadium; Attendance: 2,893; Referee: Ko Keum-Bok

29 July 24	Suwon	3–1	Incheon	Suwon, Gyeonggi
17:00	Kwak Hee-Ju 18'; Lee Yong-Rae (yellow card) 21'; Oh Beom-Seok (yellow card) 32'; Stevica Ristić (yellow card) 39' (goal) 45'; Eddy Bosnar (yellow card) 41' (yellow-red card) 46'; Oh Jang-Eun (yellow card) 90'; Ha Tae-Gyun 90+2'	Report(Eng); Report(Kor)	Nam Joon-Jae 68'	Stadium: Suwon World Cup Stadium; Attendance: 15,323; Referee: Kim Wan-Tae

4 August 25	Incheon	1–0	Chunnam	Nam-gu, Incheon
19:00	Nam Joon-Jae (yellow card) 51' (goal) 57'; Han Kyo-Won (yellow card) 66'	Report(Eng); Report(Kor)	Jung Myung-Oh (yellow card) 24'; Lee Sang-Ho (yellow card) 37'; Lee Hyun-Seung (yellow card) 39' (yellow-red card) 54'; Han Jae-Woong (yellow card) 66'	Stadium: Incheon Football Stadium; Attendance: 2,203; Referee: Kim Sung-Ho

9 August 26	Daejeon	0–2	Incheon	Yuseong-gu, Daejeon
19:00	Kevin Oris (yellow card) 37'; Yuta Baba (yellow card) 84'	Report(Eng); Report(Kor)	Park Jun-Tae 76'; Koo Bon-Sang (yellow card) 84'; Jung In-Hwan 87'	Stadium: Daejeon World Cup Stadium; Attendance: 7,583; Referee: Choi Myung-Yong

[1] Round 15 Match of Incheon vs Pohang was originally K-League restricted non-attendance match.

==== League table ====
Pos	Team	Pld	W	D	L	GF	GA	GD	Pts
7	Busan IPark	44	13	14	17	40	51	−11	53
8	Gyeongnam FC	44	14	8	22	50	60	−10	50
9	Incheon United	44	17	16	11	46	40	+6	67
10	Daegu FC	44	16	13	15	55	56	−1	61
11	Jeonnam Dragons	44	13	14	17	47	60	−13	53

Source: K League
Rules for classification: 1) Points; 2) Goal difference; 3) Goals scored.

==== Results summary ====
Overall								Home						Away					
Pld	W	D	L	GF	GA	GD	Pts	W	D	L	GF	GA	GD	W	D	L	GF	GA	GD
26	7	9	10	22	28	−6	30	5	6	2	13	11	+2	2	3	8	9	17	−8

==== Results by round ====
Round	1	2	3	4	5	6	7	8	9	10	11	12	13	14	15	16	17	18	19	20	21	22	23	24	25	26	27	28	29	30	31	32	33	34	35	36	37	38	39	40	41	42	43	44
Ground	A	H	A	H	H	A	H	A	H	A	H	A	H	A	H	A	H	H	A	A	H	A	H	A	H	A																		
Result	L	L	L	W	D	L	D	L	L	D	D	L	D	L	D	D	W	D	D	W	W	L	W	L	W	W																		
Position	15	15	15	14	15	14	15	15	15	15	15	15	15	16	16	16	16	14	15	14	12	12	11	11	11	10																		

Updated to match(es) played on 9 August 2012. Source: League Fixtures and Results
A = Away; H = Home; W = Win; D = Draw; L = Loss

=== Korean FA Cup ===
23 May Round of 32	Incheon United	3–0	Gimhae City	Nam-gu, Incheon
19:00 KST	Park Jun-Tae 31'; Seol Ki-Hyeon 70' (Assist by No.8); Ivo 78' (pen.)			Stadium: Incheon Football Stadium; Attendance: 400; Referee: Kim Yoo-Jin

20 June Round of 16	Incheon United	2–2 (a.e.t.) (3–4 p)	Goyang Kookmin Bank	Nam-gu, Incheon
19:30 KST	Kim Jae-Woong 12' (Assist by No.19); Kim Jae-Woong 44' (Assist by No.2)		Ha Jung-Heon 31'; Jung Da-Seul 72'	Stadium: Incheon Football Stadium; Attendance: 1,120
	Penalties
	Ivo (penalty scored); Joo Hyun-Jae (penalty missed); Kim Tae-Yoon (penalty missed); Koo Bon-Sang (penalty scored); Nam Il-Woo (penalty scored); Choi Jong-hoan (penalty missed)		(penalty scored) Lee Sang-Woo; (penalty scored) Lee Su-Hwan; (penalty scored) Park Byung-Won; (penalty missed) Park Sung-Jin; (penalty missed) Lee Jae-Won; (penalty scored) Hwang Ho-Ryoung

== Squad statistics ==
=== Appearances ===
Statistics accurate as of match played 27 June 2012

No.	Nat.	Pos.	Name	League		FA Cup		Appearances		Goals
No.	Nat.	Pos.	Name	Apps	Goals	Apps	Goals	App (sub)	Total	Goals
1	(South Korea)	GK	Kwon Jung-Hyuk	7	0	1	0	8 (0)	8	0
2	(South Korea)	DF	Jeon Jun-Hyung	7 (1)	0	2	0	9 (1)	10	0
3	(South Korea)	DF	Jang Won-Seok	0 (1)	0	0	0	0 (1)	1	0
4	(South Korea)	DF	Kim Tae-Yoon	7 (2)	1	1	0	8 (2)	10	1
5	(South Korea)	MF	Kim Nam-Il	13 (1)	0	0	0	13 (1)	14	0
6	(South Korea)	DF	Kim Han-Seob	8	0	0	0	8 (0)	8	0
7	(Brazil)	MF	Ivo	6 (3)	0	2	1	8 (3)	11	1
8	(South Korea)	MF	Jeong Hyuk	10 (4)	1	1 (1)	0	11 (5)	16	1
9	(South Korea)	FW	Seol Ki-Hyeon	16 (2)	5	1	1	17 (2)	19	6
11	(Australia)	FW	Nathan Burns	2 (1)	0	0	0	2 (1)	3	0
13	(South Korea)	DF	Park Tae-Min	17	0	2	0	19 (0)	19	0
14	(South Korea)	MF	Ahn Jae-Gon	0	0	0	0	0	0	0
15	(South Korea)	FW	Yoon Jun-Ha	2 (1)	0	0	0	2 (1)	3	0
16	(South Korea)	DF	Lee Yoon-Pyo	16	0	1	0	17 (0)	17	0
17	(South Korea)	MF	Moon Sang-Yoon	9 (1)	1	0	0	9 (1)	10	1
18	(South Korea)	FW	Lee Hyo-Kyun	1	0	0	0	1 (0)	1	0
19	(South Korea)	FW	Park Jun-Tae	6 (7)	1	2	1	8 (7)	15	2
20	(South Korea)	DF	Jung In-Hwan	16	1	2	0	18 (0)	18	1
21	(South Korea)	GK	Yoo Hyun	11	0	1	0	12 (0)	12	0
22	(Brazil)	MF	Nando	18	0	1	0	19 (0)	19	0
23	(South Korea)	MF	Choi Jong-hoan	6 (3)	1	0 (1)	0	6 (4)	10	1
24	(South Korea)	MF	Koo Bon-Sang	3 (1)	0	1	0	4 (1)	5	0
25	(South Korea)	MF	Son Dae-Ho	1 (3)	0	1	0	2 (3)	5	0
26	(South Korea)	MF	Joo Hyun-Jae	3 (1)	0	0 (1)	0	3 (2)	5	0
27	(South Korea)	FW	Han Kyo-Won	0 (5)	0	0 (2)	0	0 (7)	7	0
28	(South Korea)	MF	Nam Il-Woo	0 (1)	0	0 (1)	0	0 (2)	2	0
29	(South Korea)	DF	Lee Kyu-Ro	3	0	0	0	3 (0)	3	0
30	(South Korea)	FW	Jin Sung-Wook	0 (2)	0	0	0	0 (2)	2	0
31	(South Korea)	GK	Baek Sun-Kyu	0	0	0	0	0	0	0
32	(South Korea)	DF	Kim Joo-Bin	0	0	0	0	0	0	0
33	(South Korea)	DF	Park Tae-Soo	1 (1)	0	0	0	1 (1)	2	0
34	(South Korea)	DF	Lee Joon-Ho	0	0	0	0	0	0	0
35	(South Korea)	FW	Yoo Jun-Soo	1 (6)	0	1 (1)	0	2 (7)	9	0
36	(South Korea)	FW	Kim Jae-Woong	8 (2)	0	2	2	10 (2)	12	2
37	(South Korea)	FW	Shin Dong-Hyuk	0	0	0	0	0	0	0
38	(South Korea)	MF	Kim Jae-Yeon	0	0	0	0	0	0	0
39	(South Korea)	DF	Kim Tae-Eun	0	0	0	0	0	0	0
40	(South Korea)	DF	Hong Sun-Man	0	0	0	0	0	0	0
41	(South Korea)	GK	Kim Jung-In	0	0	0	0	0	0	0
42	(South Korea)	DF	Yoo Jae-Ho	0	0	0	0	0	0	0
43	(South Korea)	DF	Jung Jae-Yoon	0	0	0	0	0	0	0
44	(South Korea)	MF	Jung Soo-Woon	0	0	0	0	0	0	0
45	(South Korea)	MF	Cho Sung-Tae	0	0	0	0	0	0	0
46	(South Korea)	DF	Kim Young-In	0	0	0	0	0	0	0
47	(South Korea)	MF	Seo Young-Won	0	0	0	0	0	0	0

=== Goals and assists ===
Rank	Nation	Number	Name	K-League		KFA Cup		Sum		Total
Rank	Nation	Number	Name	Goals	Assists	Goals	Assists	Goals	Assists	Total
1	(South Korea)	9	Seol Ki-Hyeon	5	1	1	0	6	1	7
2	(South Korea)	19	Park Jun-Tae	1	0	1	1	2	1	3
=	(South Korea)	8	Jeong Hyuk	1	1	0	1	1	2	3
3	(South Korea)	36	Kim Jae-Woong	0	0	2	0	2	0	2
=	(South Korea)	17	Moon Sang-Yoon	1	1	0	0	1	1	2
4	(South Korea)	4	Kim Tae-Yoon	1	0	0	0	1	0	1
=	(South Korea)	20	Jung In-Hwan	1	0	0	0	1	0	1
=	(South Korea)	23	Choi Jong-hoan	1	0	0	0	1	0	1
=	(Brazil)	7	Ivo	0	0	1	0	1	0	1
=	(South Korea)	5	Kim Nam-Il	0	1	0	0	0	1	1
=	(South Korea)	13	Park Tae-Min	0	1	0	0	0	1	1
=	(South Korea)	29	Lee Kyu-Ro	0	1	0	0	0	1	1
=	(South Korea)	2	Jeon Jun-Hyung	0	0	0	1	0	1	1
/	/	/	Own Goals	0	-	0	-	0	-	0
/	/	/	TOTALS	11	6	5	3	16	9	

=== Discipline ===
Position	Nation	Number	Name	K-League		KFA Cup		Total	
Position	Nation	Number	Name	Yellow card	Red card	Yellow card	Red card	Yellow card	Red card
DF	(South Korea)	2	Jeon Jun-Hyung	1	0	0	0	1	0
DF	(South Korea)	3	Jang Won-Seok	1	0	0	0	1	0
DF	(South Korea)	4	Kim Tae-Yoon	0	0	1	0	1	0
MF	(South Korea)	5	Kim Nam-Il	6	0	0	0	6	0
DF	(South Korea)	6	Kim Han-Seob	1	0	0	0	1	0
MF	(Brazil)	7	Ivo	1	0	0	0	1	0
MF	(South Korea)	8	Jeong Hyuk	5	1	0	0	5	1
FW	(South Korea)	9	Seol Ki-Hyeon	1	0	0	0	1	0
DF	(South Korea)	13	Park Tae-Min	1	0	0	0	1	0
FW	(South Korea)	15	Yoon Jun-Ha	1	0	0	0	1	0
DF	(South Korea)	16	Lee Yoon-Pyo	3	0	1	0	4	0
DF	(South Korea)	20	Jung In-Hwan	4	0	0	0	4	0
MF	(Brazil)	22	Nando	2	0	0	0	2	0
MF	(South Korea)	23	Choi Jong-hoan	1	0	0	0	1	0
MF	(South Korea)	24	Koo Bon-Sang	2	1	0	0	2	1
MF	(South Korea)	25	Son Dae-Ho	1	0	0	0	1	0
FW	(South Korea)	35	Yoo Jun-Soo	0	0	1	0	1	0
FW	(South Korea)	36	Kim Jae-Woong	2	0	0	0	2	0
/	/	/	TOTALS	33	2	3	0	36	2
