= Kim Bong-gil =

South Korean footballer (born 1966)

Kim Bong-Gil 김봉길
Personal information
- Full name: Kim Bong-Gil
- Date of birth: March 15, 1966 (age 60)
- Place of birth: Incheon, South Korea
- Position: Forward

Youth career
- 1980–1983: Bupyeong High School
- 1983–1987: Yonsei University

Senior career*
Years	Team	Apps	(Gls)
1989–1994	Yukong Elephants	112	(19)
1995–1998	Jeonnam Dragons	74	(13)

International career
1988–1996	South Korea	4	(0)

Managerial career
- 1999–2001: Bupyeong High School
- 2002–2004: Baegam High School
- 2005–2007: Jeonnam Dragons (assistant)
- 2008–2010: Incheon United (assistant)
- 2010: Incheon United (interim)
- 2011–2012: Incheon United (assistant)
- 2012: Incheon United (interim)
- 2012–2014: Incheon United
- 2017: Chodang University
- 2017–2018: South Korea U-23
- 2018–2019: Kyeonggi University
- 2020–2023: Shaanxi Chang'an Athletic
- 2023–2024: Yanbian Longding
- 2025–2026: Wuxi Wugou
- * Club domestic league appearances and goals

Kim Bong-Gil (Korean: 김봉길; born March 15, 1966) is a South Korean football coach and former player.

== Football career ==
Kim was one of top wing forward in K League. After graduating from Yonsei University, he joined Yukong Elephants (present Jeju United) and was awarded 1993 K League Best MF. In 1995, Kim moved to Jeonnam Dragons and retired in 1998. He made his debut as with the South Korea national team at the 1988 Asian Cup when he played at the amateur level.

== Managerial career ==
Kim began his managerial career as head coach of one of top team in U-18 level Bupyeong High School and Baegam High School. In 2005, Kim joined Jeonnam Dragons as assistant coach of Huh Jung-Moo, former South Korea National Team coach. After three years, he joined Incheon United as assistant coach of Chang Woe-Ryong. On 8 June 2010, Serbian coach Ilija Petkovic was fired and the club appointed Kim to interim coach. On 23 August 2010, Huh Jung-Moo was appointed to Head Coach of Incheon United, but the club fired him on 11 April 2012. Kim was appointed to his second spell as interim coach and finally was confirmed as head coach of Incheon United on 16 July 2012. He rebuilt squad quickly and made his team qualified to split A group. This above achievement made his nickname so called "Bong-Gil Magic". On 19 December 2014, Incheon United dismissed Kim which caused controversy.

On 16 December 2019, Kim was appointed as the manager of Chinese club Shaanxi Chang'an Athletics, to compete in the 2020 China League One.

Kim Bong-Gil is also famous for spotting and nurturing young talent like Moon Sang-yun, Koo Bon-sang, Han Kyo-Won, Lee Seok-hyun, Jeong Hyuk, etc.
