= An Jae-jun =

An Jae-jun may refer to:

- An Jae-jun (footballer, born 1986), South Korean football centre-back
- An Jae-jun (footballer, born 2001), South Korean football forward
