= Nathan Burns =

Australian soccer player

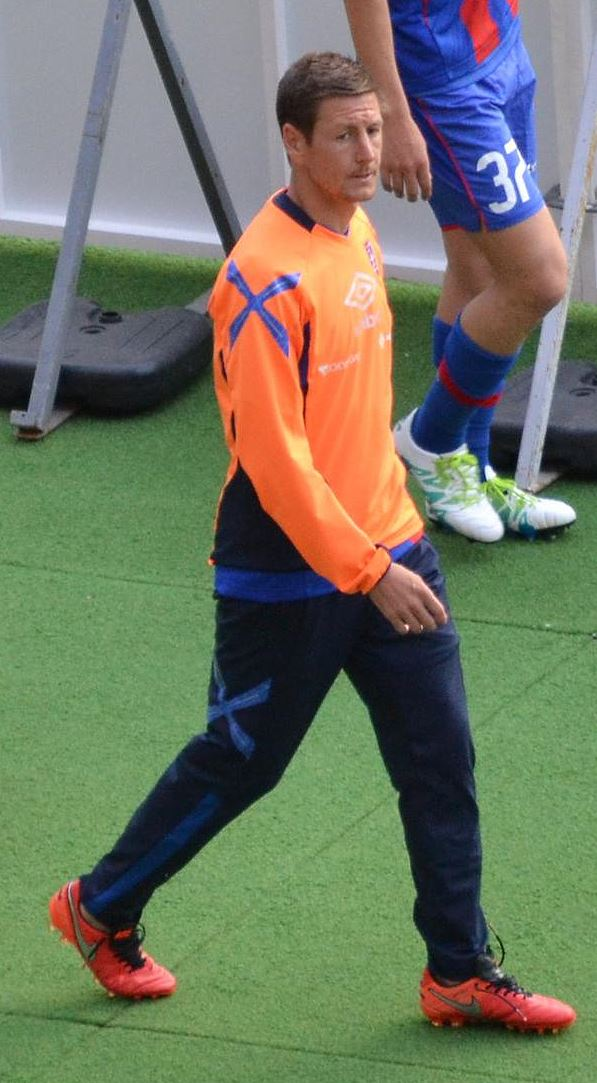
- Burns with FC Tokyo in 2016

Personal information
- Full name: Nathan Joel Burns
- Date of birth: 7 May 1988 (age 38)
- Place of birth: Orange, Australia
- Height: 1.73 m (5 ft 8 in)
- Positions: Winger; second striker

Youth career
- 2003–2004: NSWIS
- 2005: Parramatta Eagles
- 2006: AIS

Senior career*
Years	Team	Apps	(Gls)
2004–2005	Parramatta Eagles	2	(0)
2006–2008	Adelaide United	35	(9)
2008–2012	AEK Athens	26	(1)
2009–2010	→ Kerkyra (loan)	31	(8)
2012–2014	Incheon United	3	(0)
2013–2014	→ Newcastle Jets (loan)	12	(2)
2014–2015	Wellington Phoenix	24	(13)
2015–2017	FC Tokyo	26	(3)
2016–2017	FC Tokyo U-23	4	(0)
2017	Sanfrecce Hiroshima	0	(0)
2018–2019	Wellington Phoenix	25	(0)
Total		188	(36)

International career^{‡}
2004–2005	Australia U-17	6	(3)
2006–2008	Australia U-20	11	(4)
2007–2008	Australia U-23	12	(2)
2007–2016	Australia	24	(3)
Medal record
Representing Australia
Men's Association football
AFC Asian Cup
Winner	2015 Australia
Runner-up	2011 Qatar
- * Club domestic league appearances and goals as of 20 May 2019 ‡ National team caps and goals as of 15 November 2017

Nathan Burns (born 7 May 1988) is a retired Australian professional footballer who played for the Australian national team.

== Club career ==
=== Adelaide United ===
He formerly played for Parramatta Eagles and trained at the AIS.

After a few substitute appearances for Adelaide United, Burns finally got his first start against Sydney FC scoring his first A-League goal in the 4–1 loss. On 21 January 2007 Burns scored Adelaide United's first ever hat trick during a match against Central Coast Mariners, giving his side a 2nd-place finish on the league table to close out the 2nd A-League season.

After his great season with Adelaide United, Norwegian champions SK Brann invited Burns for a 10-day trial where he would train with fellow Socceroo Michael Thwaite.

=== AEK Athens ===
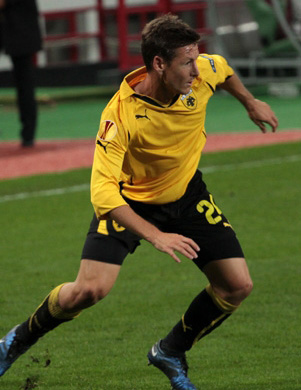
Nathan Burns playing for AEK Athens in 2011

On 10 June 2008, he signed with AEK Athens on a four-year contract. He wore the number 24 shirt.

Burns made his Greek Super League debut for AEK Athens on 28 February 2009, as 65th-minute substitute against Skoda Xanthi at the Spyros Louis Olympic Stadium in Athens. Burns scored the winner against Rangers in the final game of the 2010 Sydney Festival of Football. He scored his first league goal on 27 February 2011, in a 3–2 away win against Ergotelis.

In August 2009, he was loaned out to Beta Ethniki side Kerkyra on a one-year loan deal.

Although he was brought from Australia as a promising youngster, he never fulfilled his potential. On 19 January 2012 he terminated his contract with AEK.

=== Incheon United ===
He joined Korean club Incheon United on 25 January 2012.

Burns was on loan with Australian side Newcastle Jets in the A-League from 25 July 2013 until 11 January 2014, playing 12 games and scoring a brace.

=== Wellington Phoenix ===
On 25 June 2014 it was announced that he had signed a 2-year deal to join New Zealand team Wellington Phoenix in the A-League beginning with the 2014/15 season. On 18 October 2014, he scored his debut goal for the club against Central Coast Mariners. Burns made history in the Round 8 clash against Melbourne City, becoming the first Phoenix player to score a hat trick in their 5–1 victory. On 6 December he scored his 8th goal of the season in a 3–1 come from behind victory over Newcastle Jets at Hunter Stadium. On 21 December he scored two goals in a 2–0 away win over Sydney FC, making him the fastest A-league player to ever reach 10 goals in a season, and did not return to New Zealand as he got his international recall for Australia ahead of the Asian Cup.

=== FC Tokyo ===
In July Burns left the A-League for J1 League club FC Tokyo.

=== Sanfrecce Hiroshima ===
Following speculation of Burns returning to the A-League following the end of his contract at FC Tokyo, he stayed in Japan, joining Sanfrecce Hiroshima on 13 July 2017.

=== Return to Wellington Phoenix ===
On 30 December 2017 it was announced that Nathan Burns would be returning to Wellington Phoenix on a two-year contract. Burns was not offered a contract renewal and was released by the club following the conclusion of the 2018–19 A-League season.

== International career ==
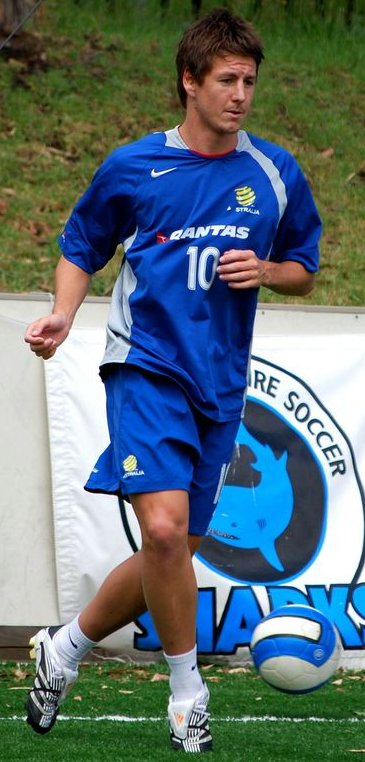
Burns with the Olyroos in 2008

=== Youth ===
He competed for the Joeys at 2005 FIFA U-17 World Championship in Peru.

He scored his first goal for the Young Socceroos in the AFC Youth Cup in a 3–1 win over Thailand.

=== Senior ===
He made his debut for the Socceroos with a brief appearance in the 3–0 win over Singapore on 30 June 2007.

Burns came on as a substitute in the opening game in Melbourne of the 2015 AFC Asian Cup against Kuwait, and was twice denied a goal, the first when his shot hit the crossbar, and the second when the goalkeeper made a brilliant save.

On 17 January 2015, Burns made his first start for the Socceroos since 2011, when he lined up for the final group game of the 2015 AFC Asian Cup for Australia against South Korea.

On 3 September 2015, Burns scored his first goal for Australia, eight years after his senior debut, scoring in a 5–0 defeat of Bangladesh in a 2018 FIFA World Cup qualifier.

== Career statistics ==
=== Club ===
Appearances and goals by club, season and competition
Club	Season	League			National cup (Note: Includes Waratah Cup, Greek Football Cup, Korean FA Cup, Emperor's Cup)		League cup (Note: Includes A-League Pre-Season Challenge Cup, J.League Cup)		Continental		Total	
Club	Season	Division	Apps	Goals	Apps	Goals	Apps	Goals	Apps	Goals	Apps	Goals
Parramatta Eagles	2004–05	NSW Premier League	2	0	0	0	–		–		2	0
Adelaide United	2006–07	A-League	21	6	–		3	0	5	1	29	7
Adelaide United	2007–08	A-League	14	3	–		5	1	6	0	25	4
Adelaide United	Total		35	9	0	0	8	1	11	1	54	11
AEK Athens	2008–09	Super League Greece	5	0	0	0	–		0	0	5	0
AEK Athens	2010–11	Super League Greece	18	1	2	0	–		5	0	25	1
AEK Athens	2011–12	Super League Greece	3	0	1	0	–		4	1	8	1
AEK Athens	Total		26	1	3	0	0	0	9	1	38	2
Kerkyra (loan)	2009–10	Beta Ethniki	31	8	0	0	–		–		31	8
Incheon United	2012	K-League	3	0	0	0	–		–		3	0
Incheon United	2013	K League Classic	0	0	0	0	–		–		0	0
Incheon United	2014	K League Classic	0	0	0	0	–		–		0	0
Incheon United	Total		3	0	0	0	0	0	0	0	3	0
Newcastle Jets (loan)	2013–14	A-League	12	2	–		–		–		12	2
Wellington Phoenix	2014–15	A-League	24	13	1	0	–		–		25	13
FC Tokyo	2015	J1 League	10	2	1	0	0	0	–		11	2
FC Tokyo	2016	J1 League	16	1	0	0	2	0	5	1	23	2
FC Tokyo	2017	J1 League	0	0	0	0	4	0	–		4	0
FC Tokyo	Total		26	3	1	0	6	0	5	1	38	4
Wellington Phoenix	2017–18	A-League	15	0	0	0	–		–		15	0
Wellington Phoenix	2018–19	A-League	10	0	1	0	–		–		11	0
Wellington Phoenix	Total		25	0	1	0	0	0	0	0	26	0
Career total			184	36	6	0	14	1	25	3	229	40

=== International ===
Australia national team
Year	Apps	Goals
2007	1	0
2008	1	0
2010	2	0
2011	3	0
2012	1	0
2015	10	1
2016	6	2
Total	24	3

Last updated: 15 November 2016
Source: Nathan Burns at National-Football-Teams.com

=== International Goals ===
As of 24 March 2016

Scores and results list Australia's goal tally first.

No.	Date	Venue	Opponent	Score	Result	Competition
1.	3 September 2015	Perth Oval, Perth, Australia	Bangladesh	4–0	5–0	2018 FIFA World Cup qualification
2.	24 March 2016	Adelaide Oval, Adelaide, Australia	Tajikistan	4–0	7–0	2018 FIFA World Cup qualification
3.	24 March 2016	Adelaide Oval, Adelaide, Australia	Tajikistan	7–0	7–0	2018 FIFA World Cup qualification

== Honours ==
=== Player ===
AEK Athens

- Greek Cup: 2010–11

Australia

- AFC Asian Cup: 2015; runner-up 2011

=== Individual ===
- Rising Star Award: 2006-07
- Wellington Phoenix Player of the Year: 2014–15
- Johnny Warren Medal: 2014–15
- A-League PFA Team of the Season: 2014–15
