= Kim Nam-il =

South Korean footballer (born 1977)

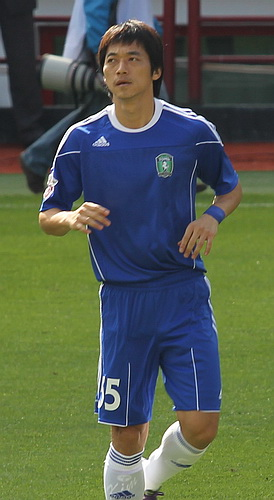
- Kim with Tom Tomsk in 2010

Personal information
- Full name: Kim Nam-il
- Date of birth: 14 March 1977 (age 49)
- Place of birth: Incheon, South Korea
- Height: 1.82 m (5 ft 11 1/2 in)
- Position: Defensive midfielder

College career
Years	Team	Apps	(Gls)
1996–1999	Hanyang University		

Senior career*
Years	Team	Apps	(Gls)
2000–2004	Jeonnam Dragons	92	(7)
2003	→ Feyenoord (loan)	0	(0)
2003	→ Excelsior (loan)	8	(0)
2005–2007	Suwon Samsung Bluewings	45	(0)
2008–2009	Vissel Kobe	54	(1)
2010–2011	Tom Tomsk	41	(0)
2012–2013	Incheon United	59	(0)
2014	Jeonbuk Hyundai Motors	20	(2)
2015	Kyoto Sanga	27	(1)
Total		346	(11)

International career
1996	South Korea U20	4	(1)
1999	South Korea U23	17	(1)
1998–2013	South Korea	98	(2)

Managerial career
- 2020–2022: Seongnam FC
Medal record
Representing South Korea
Men's football
AFC Youth Championship
Winner	1996 South Korea
EAFF Championship
Winner	2008 China
- * Club domestic league appearances and goals

- Kim Nam-il
- Hangul: 김남일
- Hanja: 金南一
- RR: Gim Namil
- MR: Kim Namil

Kim Nam-il (Korean: 김남일; Hanja: 金南一; born 14 March 1977) is a South Korean football manager and former player. He played as a defensive midfielder for the South Korea national team at the 2002, 2006 and 2010 FIFA World Cups.

== Early life and education ==
Kim began playing football when he was in third grade of elementary school. His decision to play football was initially met with opposition from his parents because of his impressive academic performance, but he continued his footballing career during his schooldays.

At the 1996 AFC Youth Championship, he played for the South Korea under-20 team, and scored his first international goal against Iran. He was not selected as a participant at the 1997 FIFA World Youth Championship, but was called up for the senior national team for the 1998 Asian Games by manager Huh Jung-moo. He made his senior international debut at the Asian Games.

== Playing career ==
Under manager Guus Hiddink, Kim began to play for the national team in earnest. An unimpressive K League player at the time, he was criticised for his poor basic skills early in his international career. Over time, he became an irreplaceable defensive midfielder skilled at pre-empting opponents' counterattacks in Hiddink's belief. He was nicknamed the "Vacuum cleaner" after showing limitless stamina and relentless tussles. At the 2002 FIFA World Cup, he played all five matches until the quarter-finals. After he quit the tournament due to an ankle injury, South Korea lost to Germany in the semi-finals. After the tournament, he suddenly gained a huge female fan base, and led to sell out tickets for Jeonnam Dragons' matches. The club were also asked to put him on television shows by several broadcasters. South Korean journalists called this phenomenon "Kim Nam-il Syndrome".

In January 2003, Kim joined Eredivisie club Feyenoord on loan, and was subleased to their satellite club Excelsior to be tested for five months. However, he returned to South Korea after failing to make a strong impression at Excelsior.

At the 2006 FIFA World Cup, Kim contributed to both South Korea's defense and attack. His long-range passes in matches against Togo and France got a good press. He also played for his country at the 2010 FIFA World Cup, but was blamed by his compatriots after conceding a penalty to Nigeria.

== Managerial career ==
Kim started his coaching career at Chinese Super League club Jiangsu Suning in 2016. He joined South Korea's coaching staff for the 2018 FIFA World Cup in Russia. After the World Cup, he joined Jeonnam Dragons as a coach.

On 23 December 2019, Kim was appointed as manager of K League 1 club Seongnam FC. On 24 August 2022, he resigned from the club due to poor results.

== Personal life ==
Kim is the youngest of three brothers in his family, and is a close friend of Lee Kwan-woo and Lee Dong-gook.

During his playing career, Kim was known for being extremely private about his personal life. He had kept his relationship and engagement to KBS anchorwoman Kim Bo-min a secret until intense speculation, which involved the media interviewing his own parents, eventually led to them confirming the rumors and revealing that they had been dating for three years. The couple legally registered their marriage in June 2007 and had a private ceremony at a hotel that December. Their son was born in 2008.

== Career statistics ==
=== Club ===
Appearances and goals by club, season and competition
Club	Season	League			National Cup		League Cup		Continental		Total	
Club	Season	Division	Apps	Goals	Apps	Goals	Apps	Goals	Apps	Goals	Apps	Goals
Jeonnam Dragons	2000	K League	20	0	2	0	10	1	—		32	1
Jeonnam Dragons	2001	K League	25	0	2	0	0	0	—		27	0
Jeonnam Dragons	2002	K League	14	0	0	0	1	0	—		15	0
Jeonnam Dragons	2003	K League	23	6	0	0	—		—		23	6
Jeonnam Dragons	2004	K League	10	1	2	0	0	0	—		12	1
Jeonnam Dragons	Total		92	7	6	0	11	1	—		109	8
Feyenoord (loan)	2002–03	Eredivisie	—		—		—		—		—	
Excelsior (loan)	2002–03	Eredivisie	8	0	0	0	—		—		8	0
Suwon Samsung Bluewings	2005	K League	2	0	3	2	4	0	1 (Note: Appearance in Korean Super Cup)	0	10	2
Suwon Samsung Bluewings	2006	K League	23	0	4	0	3	0	—		30	0
Suwon Samsung Bluewings	2007	K League	20	0	1	0	8	0	—		29	0
Suwon Samsung Bluewings	Total		45	0	8	2	15	0	1	0	69	2
Vissel Kobe	2008	J1 League	31	1	1	0	1	0	—		33	1
Vissel Kobe	2009	J1 League	23	0	1	0	2	0	—		26	0
Vissel Kobe	Total		54	1	2	0	3	0	—		59	1
Tom Tomsk	2010	Russian Premier League	24	0	1	0	—		—		25	0
Tom Tomsk	2011–12	Russian Premier League	17	0	0	0	—		—		17	0
Tom Tomsk	Total		41	0	0	0	—		—		41	0
Incheon United	2012	K League	34	0	0	0	—		—		34	0
Incheon United	2013	K League 1	25	0	0	0	—		—		25	0
Incheon United	Total		59	0	0	0	—		—		59	0
Jeonbuk Hyundai Motors	2014	K League 1	20	2	0	0	—		—		20	2
Kyoto Sanga	2015	J2 League	27	1	0	0	0	0	—		27	1
Career total			346	11	16	2	29	1	1	0	392	14

=== International ===
Appearances and goals by national team and year
National team	Year	Apps	Goals
South Korea	1998	2	0
South Korea	2000	3	0
South Korea	2001	7	1
South Korea	2002	17	0
South Korea	2003	11	0
South Korea	2004	12	1
South Korea	2005	6	0
South Korea	2006	14	0
South Korea	2007	2	0
South Korea	2008	12	0
South Korea	2009	4	0
South Korea	2010	7	0
South Korea	2013	1	0
Career total		98	2

Results list South Korea's goal tally first.

List of international goals scored by Kim Nam-il
No.	Date	Venue	Opponent	Score	Result	Competition
1	10 November 2001	Seoul, South Korea	Croatia	2–0	2–0	Friendly
2	31 July 2004	Jinan, China	Iran	3–3	3–4	2004 AFC Asian Cup

== Honours ==
=== Player ===
Jeonnam Dragons

- Korean FA Cup runner-up: 2003
- Korean League Cup runner-up: 2000+

Suwon Samsung Bluewings

- Korean FA Cup runner-up: 2006
- Korean League Cup: 2005
- Korean Super Cup: 2005
- A3 Champions Cup: 2005

Jeonbuk Hyundai Motors

- K League 1: 2014

South Korea U20

- AFC Youth Championship: 1996

South Korea

- EAFF Championship: 2008

Individual

- K League All-Star: 2000, 2001, 2002, 2003, 2004, 2006, 2007, 2013
- CONCACAF Gold Cup Best XI: 2002
- K League 1 Best XI: 2003
- EAFF Championship Most Valuable Player: 2008
- J.League All-Star: 2008

=== Manager ===
Individual

- K League Manager of the Month: May 2020

Sporting positions
Preceded by Choi Sung-Yong	Suwon Samsung Bluewings captain 2006	Succeeded by Lee Kwan-Woo
Preceded by Jung In-whan	Incheon United captain 2013	Succeeded by Park Tae-Min
