= Son Dae-ho =

South Korean footballer (born 1981)

Son Dae-Ho 손대호
Personal information
- Full name: Son Dae-Ho
- Date of birth: September 11, 1981 (age 45)
- Place of birth: Pohang, Gyeongbuk, South Korea
- Height: 1.86 m (6 ft 1 in)
- Position: Defensive midfielder

Youth career
- 2000–2001: Myongji University

Senior career*
Years	Team	Apps	(Gls)
2002–2004	Suwon Samsung Bluewings	22	(1)
2005	Chunnam Dragons	1	(0)
2005–2008	Seongnam Ilhwa Chunma	58	(2)
2009–2013	Incheon United	51	(1)
2014	Hangzhou Greentown	22	(0)
2015	BEC Tero Sasana	1	(0)
Total		155	(4)

International career
2007	South Korea	7	(0)
- * Club domestic league appearances and goals

- Son Dae-ho
- Hangul: 손대호
- Hanja: 孫大鎬
- RR: Son Daeho
- MR: Son Taeho

Son Dae-Ho (Korean: 손대호; born September 11, 1981) is a South Korean football player. Son is a tough defender who utilizes his own height and strong pressure. His nickname is 'tough guy' in K-League.

== Club career ==
In 2002, Son joined Suwon Samsung Bluewings, and in 2005, he transferred to Chunnam Dragons. However, he was traded with Kim Do-Kyun and transferred to Seongnam Ilhwa Chunma. In 2007, he contributed much to his team and Seongnam Ilhwa Chunma got second place in the league. However, in 2008, the coach changed from Kim Hak-Beom to Shin Tae-Yong due to the poor performance and he got traded Incheon United After that, in order to finish his military duty, he tried to enter Sangju Sangmu Phoenix. But failed with date calculation, he got started the Social Service Personnel, the supplement system of the military duty. He returned to Incheon United in January 2012, playing as defensive midfielder for Incheon United with Kim Nam-il. His performance was prodigious in terms of both quantity and quality with his veteran experience in spite of his two years career break.

On 9 November 2014, Son signed a one-year deal with Chinese Super League side Hangzhou Greentown.

== International career ==
He got chosen by Pim Verbeek who was the head coach of the Australian national football team. He regarded Son Dae-Ho's strength and power very high. He made his debut June 2, 2007 versus Netherlands, and he was a regular midfielder in 2007 AFC Asian Cup and made Korean national football team semi-final.

== Career statistics ==
Appearances and goals by club, season and competition
Club	Season	League			Cup		League Cup		Continental		Total	
Club	Season	Division	Apps	Goals	Apps	Goals	Apps	Goals	Apps	Goals	Apps	Goals
Suwon Samsung Bluewings	2002	K-League	6	0			8	0	—		14	0
Suwon Samsung Bluewings	2003	K-League	8	1	0	0			—		8	1
Suwon Samsung Bluewings	2004	K-League	8	0	1	0	12	0	—		21	0
Suwon Samsung Bluewings	Total		22	1	1	0	20	0	—		43	1
Chunnam Dragons	2005	K-League	1	0	0	0	5	0	—		6	0
Seongnam Ilhwa Chunma	2005	K-League	6	0	0	0	0	0	—		6	0
Seongnam Ilhwa Chunma	2006	K-League	7	0	1	0	3	0	—		11	0
Seongnam Ilhwa Chunma	2007	K-League	25	2	0	0	1	0	5	1	31	3
Seongnam Ilhwa Chunma	2008	K-League	20	0	2	0	9	1	—		31	1
Seongnam Ilhwa Chunma	Total		58	2	3	0	13	1	5	1	79	4
Incheon United	2009	K-League	6	0	1	0	4	0	—		11	0
Incheon United	2012	K-League	22	0	1	0	—		—		23	0
Incheon United	2013	K-League	23	1	2	0	—		—		25	1
Incheon United	Total		51	1	4	0	4	0	—		59	1
Hangzhou Greentown	2014	Chinese Super League	22	0	1	0	—		—		23	0
BEC Tero Sasana	2015	Thai Premier League	1	0					—		1	0
Career total			155	4	9	0	42	1	5	1	211	6
