= Thiago Elias =

Brazilian footballer (born 1987)

Personal information
- Full name: Thiago Elias do Nascimento Silva
- Date of birth: 9 June 1987 (age 39)
- Place of birth: Brazil
- Height: 1.76 m (5 ft 9 in)
- Position: Forward

Senior career*
Years	Team	Apps	(Gls)
2007–2009	Paulista	0	(0)
2010–2011	União São João	6	(0)
2011	Lemense	7	(0)
2012	Juventus-SP	23	(8)
2012	Grêmio Barueri	18	(4)
2013	Ferroviária	0	(0)
2013	Incheon United	15	(1)
2014	Ferroviária	7	(0)
2015	Marília	13	(0)
2016	Itumbiara	4	(0)
2017	Tigres do Brasil	6	(1)
2017	Sertãozinho	6	(1)
2017	Samut Sakhon	22	(13)
2019	Nacional SP	0	(0)
2020–2021	Bankhai United	11	(2)
- * Club domestic league appearances and goals as of 01:03, 20 December 2020 (UTC)

Thiago Elias do Nascimento Silva (born 9 June 1987), known as Thiago Elias, is a Brazilian footballer.
