= Michuhol District =

District of Incheon, South Korea

Coordinates: 37.46°N 126.65°E

Michuhol
- Autonomous District
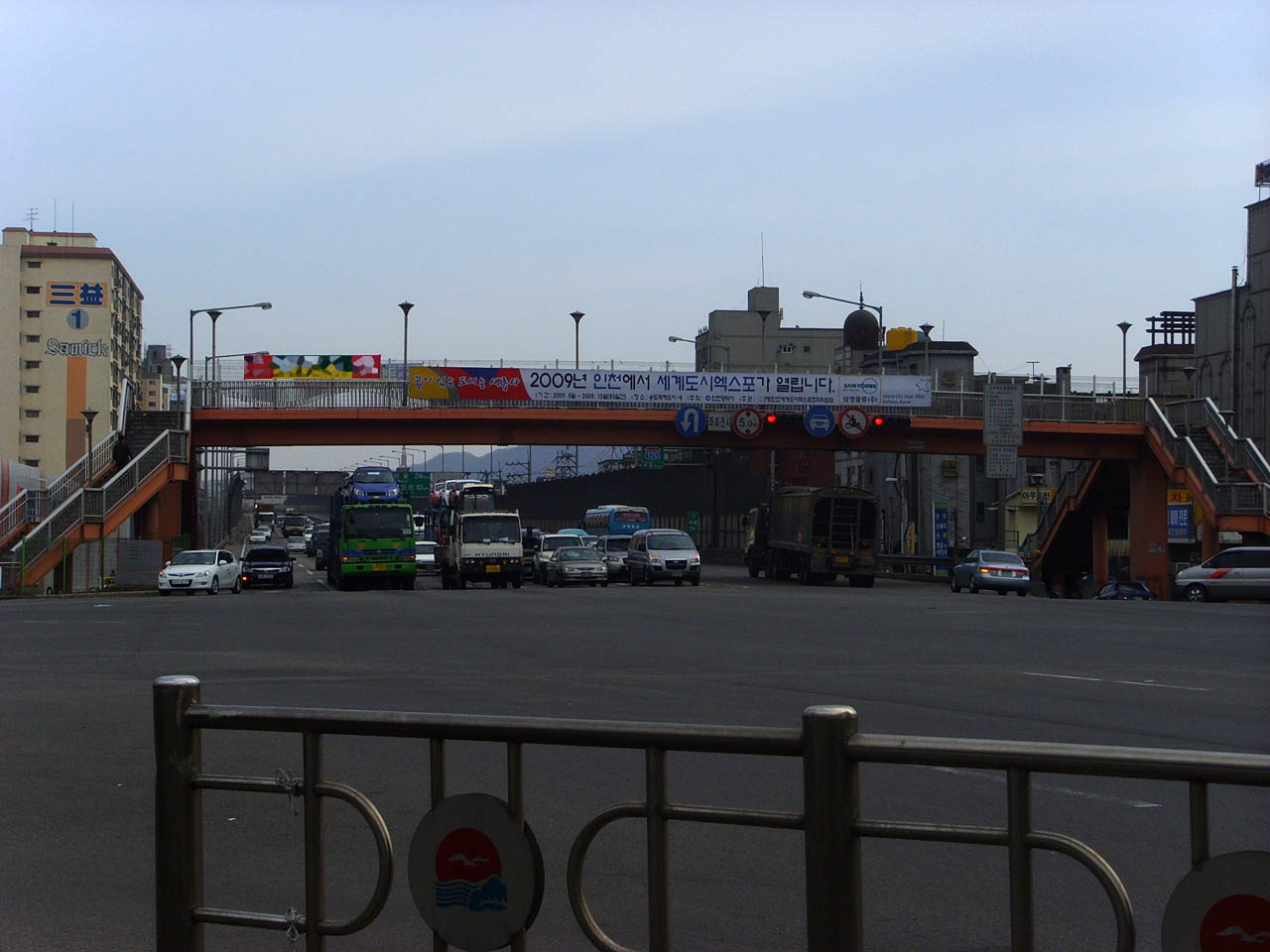

- Flag

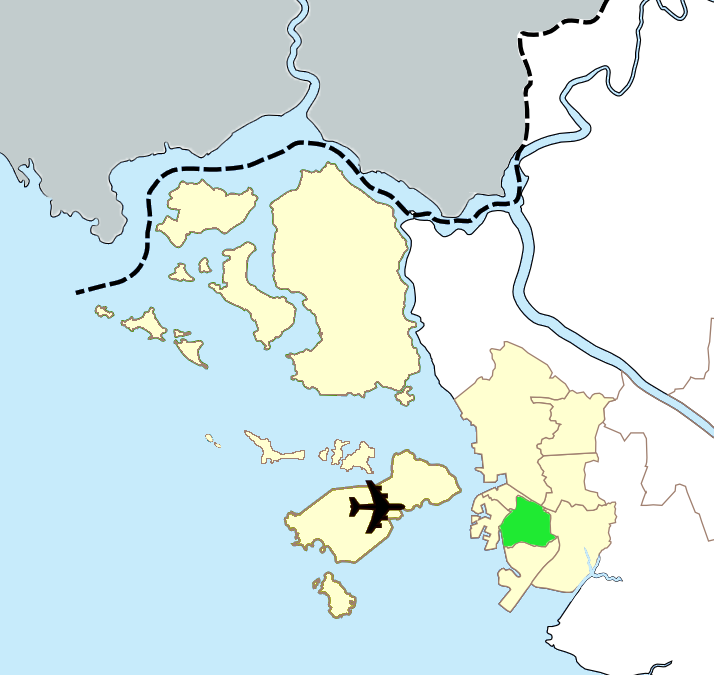
- Country: South Korea
- Region: Sudogwon
- Provincial level: Incheon
- Administrative divisions: 21 administrative dong

Area
  - Total: 24.84 km^{2} (9.59 sq mi)

Population (September 2024)
  - Total: 410,913
  - Density: 16,540/km^{2} (42,840/sq mi)
  - Dialect: Seoul
- Website: Michuhol District Office

Korean name
- Hangul: 미추홀구
- Hanja: 彌鄒忽區
- RR: Michuhol-gu
- MR: Mich'uhol-gu

Michuhol District (Korean: 미추홀구) is a municipal district in Incheon, South Korea. This district was called Nam (South) District until July 1, 2018.

Michuhol District is the historical heart of old Incheon. It is home to historical sites such as Mt Munhaksan, Dohobucheongsa (the office building of old Incheon), and Incheon Hyanggyo, the local public school of old Incheon.

Michuhol District is now a higher education center of Incheon; the University of Incheon and Inha University are located in Michuhol District.

== Administrative subdivisions ==
Administrative divisions

- Dohwa 1 to 3 Dong
- Sungui 1 to 4 Dong
- Yonghyeon 1 to 5 Dong
- Juan 1 to 8 Dong
- Hagik 1 and 2 Dong
- Gwangyo-dong
- Munhak-dong
