= Choi Jong-hoan =

South Korean footballer (born 1987)

Personal information
- Date of birth: August 12, 1987 (age 39)
- Place of birth: South Korea
- Height: 1.77 m (5 ft 10 in)
- Positions: Right-back; right midfielder

Team information
- Current team: Suwon FC

Youth career
- 2003–2005: Jeongmyung High School
- 2006: Pukyong National University

Senior career*
Years	Team	Apps	(Gls)
2007–2009	Ulsan Hyundai Mipo Dockyard	37	(7)
2010–2011	FC Seoul	7	(1)
2012–2018	Incheon United	113	(7)
2015–2017	→ Sangju Sangmu (army)	25	(0)
2019	Seoul E-Land	19	(1)
2020–	Suwon FC	0	(0)
- * Club domestic league appearances and goals as of 26 December 2019

- Choi Jong-hoan
- Hangul: 최종환
- Hanja: 催鍾桓
- RR: Choe Jonghwan
- MR: Ch'oe Chonghwan

Choi Jong-hoan (or Choi Jong-hwan, Korean: 최종환; born August 12, 1987) is a South Korean football player who plays for Suwon FC.
