= Lee Hyo-kyun =

South Korean footballer

Personal information
- Full name: Lee Hyo-kyun
- Date of birth: 12 March 1988 (age 38)
- Place of birth: South Korea
- Height: 1.85 m (6 ft 1 in)
- Position: Centre forward

Team information
- Current team: Incheon United
- Number: 28

Youth career
- Dong-A University

Senior career*
Years	Team	Apps	(Gls)
2011	Gyeongnam FC	12	(2)
2012–	Incheon United	52	(8)
2015	→ FC Anyang (loan)	15	(2)
- * Club domestic league appearances and goals as of 31 October 2015

- Lee Hyo-kyun
- Hangul: 이효균
- Hanja: 李孝均
- RR: I Hyogyun
- MR: I Hyogyun

Lee Hyo-kyun (Korean: 이효균; born 12 March 1988) is a South Korean football centre forward who plays for Incheon United.

== Club career ==
Lee was one of Gyeongnam FC's draft picks for the 2011 season. He made his professional debut on 25 June 2011, coming on as a late substitute in Gyeongnam's home loss to the Pohang Steelers. Lee's first professional goal opened the scoring in the 2011 K-League Cup semi-final on 6 July 2011 between Gyeongnam and Ulsan Hyundai FC, but it wasn't enough to prevent Ulsan advancing to the K-League Cup final.

During the 2012 off-season, Lee moved to league rivals Incheon United.

== Club career statistics ==
As of 6 March 2015

Club performance			League		Cup		League Cup		Total	
Season	Club	League	Apps	Goals	Apps	Goals	Apps	Goals	Apps	Goals
South Korea			League		KFA Cup		League Cup		Total	
2011	Gyeongnam FC	K League 1	12	2	0	0	1	1	13	3
2012	Incheon United	K League 1	1	0	0	0	-		1	0
2013	Incheon United	K League 1	13	3	2	0	-		15	3
2014	Incheon United	K League 1	29	4	0	0	-		29	4
Career total			55	9	2	0	1	1	58	10
