= Kim Tae-yoon (footballer) =

South Korean footballer

Personal information
- Date of birth: 25 July 1986 (age 40)
- Place of birth: Busan, South Korea
- Height: 1.86 m (6 ft 1 in)
- Position: Defender

Youth career
- 2002–2004: Pungsaeng High School

Senior career*
Years	Team	Apps	(Gls)
2005–2011	Seongnam Ilhwa Chunma	64	(1)
2008–2009	→ Gwangju Sangmu (army)	34	(0)
2012–2013	Incheon United	31	(1)
2014	Samut Songkhram	18	(0)
2015–2017	Seongnam FC	54	(1)
2018–2020	Gwangju FC	19	(0)

International career
2007	South Korea U-23	1	(0)
- * Club domestic league appearances and goals as of 10 January 2021

- Kim Tae-yoon
- Hangul: 김태윤
- Hanja: 金台潤
- RR: Gim Taeyun
- MR: Kim T'aeyun

Kim Tae-yoon (Korean: 김태윤; born 25 July 1986) is a retired South Korean football defender.

== Career statistics ==
As of end of the 2011 season

Club performance			League		Cup		League Cup		Continental		Total	
Season	Club	League	Apps	Goals	Apps	Goals	Apps	Goals	Apps	Goals	Apps	Goals
Korea Republic			League		FA Cup		K-League Cup		Asia		Total	
2005	Seongnam Ilhwa	K League 1	17	0	1	1	1	0	-		19	1
2006	Seongnam Ilhwa	K League 1	12	1	1	0	9	0	-		22	1
2007	Seongnam Ilhwa	K League 1	1	0	1	0	0	0	1	0	3	0
2008	Gwangju Sangmu	K League 1	19	0	3	0	9	0	-		28	0
2009	Gwangju Sangmu	K League 1	15	0	2	0	3	0	-		20	0
2009	Seongnam Ilhwa	K League 1	1	0	1	0	0	0	-		2	0
2010	Seongnam Ilhwa	K League 1	8	0	0	0	1	0	1	0	10	0
2011	Seongnam Ilhwa	K League 1	25	0	5	0	3	0	-		33	0
2012	Incheon United	K League 1							-			
Country	Korea Republic		98	1	14	1	26	0	2	0	140	2
Total			98	1	14	1	26	0	2	0	140	2

== Honors ==
=== Club ===
Seongnam Ilhwa Chunma

- 2010 AFC Champions League Winner
- 2011 FA Cup Winner
