= An Jae-jun (footballer, born 1986) =

South Korean footballer

Personal information
- Full name: An Jae-jun
- Date of birth: 8 February 1986 (age 40)
- Place of birth: South Korea
- Height: 1.86 m (6 ft 1 in)
- Position: Centre-back

Team information
- Current team: Daejeon Citizen
- Number: 6

Youth career
- 2005–2007: Korea University

Senior career*
Years	Team	Apps	(Gls)
2008–2010	Incheon United	72	(1)
2011–2012	Jeonnam Dragons	59	(2)
2013–2016	Incheon United	67	(4)
2015–2016	→ Ansan Police (army)	43	(1)
2017	Seongnam FC	13	(0)
2018	Daejeon Citizen	10	(0)
2019–	Army United	24	(1)

International career
2004–2005	South Korea U-20	12	(0)
- * Club domestic league appearances and goals as of 18 September 2019

An Jae-jun (Korean: 안재준; born 8 February 1986) is a South Korean football centre-back, who plays for Army United.

== Club career statistics ==
Club performance			League		Cup		League Cup		Continental		Total	
Season	Club	League	Apps	Goals	Apps	Goals	Apps	Goals	Apps	Goals	Apps	Goals
South Korea			League		KFA Cup		League Cup		Asia		Total	
2008	Incheon United	K League 1	21	0	1	0	7	0	-		29	0
2009	Incheon United	K League 1	27	0	1	0	6	0	-		34	0
2010	Incheon United	K League 1	24	1	2	0	4	0	-		30	1
2011	Chunnam Dragons	K League 1	27	1	2	0	0	0	-		29	1
2012	Chunnam Dragons	K League 1	32	1	2	0	-		-		34	1
Career total			131	3	8	0	17	0			156	3
