= Lee Yun-pyo =

South Korean footballer (born 1984)

Personal information
- Date of birth: 4 September 1984 (age 42)
- Place of birth: South Korea
- Height: 1.84 m (6 ft 0 in)
- Position: Centre-back

Senior career*
Years	Team	Apps	(Gls)
2008	Chunnam Dragons	1	(0)
2009	Daejeon Citizen	13	(0)
2010	FC Seoul	0	(0)
2011–2019	Incheon United	134	(5)
- * Club domestic league appearances and goals as of 4:00, 12 September 2015 (UTC)

- Lee Yun-pyo
- Hangul: 이윤표
- Hanja: 李允杓
- RR: I Yunpyo
- MR: I Yunp'yo

Lee Yun-pyo (Korean: 이윤표; born 4 September 1984) is a South Korean footballer who plays as defender for Incheon United.
