= Park Jun-tae =

South Korean footballer (born 1989)

Park Jun-Tae
Personal information
- Full name: Park Jun-Tae
- Date of birth: 2 December 1989 (age 36)
- Place of birth: South Korea
- Height: 1.72 m (5 ft 7 1/2 in)
- Position: Forward

Team information
- Current team: Hwaseong FC
- Number: 7

Youth career
- 2006–2008: Korea University

Senior career*
Years	Team	Apps	(Gls)
2009–2010	Ulsan Hyundai	7	(0)
2010	→ Ulsan Hyundai Mipo (loan)	14	(4)
2011–2012	Incheon United	50	(8)
2013–2016	Jeonnam Dragons	38	(1)
2015–2016	→ Sangju Sangmu (army)	26	(8)
2017	Busan IPark	23	(2)
2018	Jeonnam Dragons	8	(0)
2020-	Hwaseong FC	42	(3)
- * Club domestic league appearances and goals as of 23 October 2022

Park Jun-Tae (Korean: 박준태; born 2 December 1989) is a South Korean football forward who plays for Hwaseong FC. He has previously played for Ulsan Hyundai, Incheon United and Busan IPark.

== Club career ==
Picked from the K-League draft by Ulsan Hyundai for the 2009 season, Park made the majority of his appearances in 2009 from the bench as a substitute. He featured in the 2009 AFC Champions League, including a start in Ulsan's away loss to Australian club Newcastle Jets.

After a single match for Ulsan Hyundai in 2010, he then spent the remainder of the 2010 season on loan to National League club Ulsan Hyundai Mipo Dockyard. Park returned to the K-League with a shift to Incheon United for the 2011 season. On 17 April 2011, Park scored his first professional goal in the dying minutes of the match against Seongnam Ilhwa Chunma, helping his side to a 2 -1 win.

== Club career statistics ==
As of 4 December 2018

Club performance			League		Cup		League Cup		Continental		Other		Total	
Season	Club	League	Apps	Goals	Apps	Goals	Apps	Goals	Apps	Goals	Apps	Goals	Apps	Goals
South Korea			League		KFA Cup		League Cup		Asia		Play-offs		Total	
2009	Ulsan Hyundai	K League 1	5	0	1	0	3	0	4	0	-		13	0
2010	Ulsan Hyundai	K League 1	0	0	0	0	1	0	-		-		1	0
2011	Incheon United	K League 1	23	5	1	0	3	0	-		-		27	5
2012	Incheon United	K League 1	27	3	1	0	-		-		-		28	3
2013	Chunnam Dragons	K League 1	27	1	0	0	-		-		-		27	1
2014	Chunnam Dragons	K League 1	7	0	0	0	-		-		-		7	0
2015	Sangju Sangmu	K League 2	2	0	0	0	-		-		-		2	0
2016	Sangju Sangmu	K League 1	24	8	0	0	-		-		-		24	8
2016	Chunnam Dragons	K League 1	4	0	0	0	-		-		-		4	0
2017	Busan IPark	K League 2	23	2	3	0	-		-		1	0	27	2
2018	Jeonnam Dragons	K League 1	8	0	1	0	-		-		-		9	0
Career total			150	19	7	0	7	0	4	0	1	0	169	19
