= Lee Seok-hyun (footballer) =

South Korean footballer (born 1990)

Personal information
- Full name: Lee Seok-hyun
- Date of birth: 13 June 1990 (age 36)
- Place of birth: South Korea
- Height: 1.77 m (5 ft 9 1/2 in)
- Position: Attacking midfielder

Team information
- Current team: Jeonnam Dragons
- Number: 23

Youth career
- 2009–2012: Sunmoon University

Senior career*
Years	Team	Apps	(Gls)
2013–2014	Incheon United	58	(8)
2015–2018	FC Seoul	49	(3)
2018–2019	Pohang Steelers	18	(5)
2021–	Jeonnam Dragons FC	34	(1)
- * Club domestic league appearances and goals as of 17 October 2022

Lee Seok-hyun (Korean: 이석현; born 13 June 1990) is a South Korean footballer who plays as midfielder for Jeonnam Dragons.

== Career ==
=== Incheon United ===
Incheon United signed him in December 2012. He made his debut goal against FC Seoul on 9 March 2013.

=== FC Seoul ===
On 2 January 2015, He joined FC Seoul.

=== Pohang Steelers ===
On 28 July 2018, He joined Pohang Steelers.
