= Jeon Jun-hyung =

South Korean footballer

Jeon Jun-Hyung
Personal information
- Full name: Jeon Jun-Hyung
- Date of birth: 28 August 1986 (age 40)
- Place of birth: Busan, South Korea
- Height: 1.81 m (5 ft 11 1/2 in)
- Position: Centre back

Team information
- Current team: Gwangju FC
- Number: 3

Senior career*
Years	Team	Apps	(Gls)
2006–2008	Marília	15	(9)
2009–2010	Gyeongnam FC	21	(1)
2011–2013	Incheon United	28	(0)
2014–	Gwangju FC	8	(0)
- * Club domestic league appearances and goals as of 23 November 2014

- Jeon Jun-hyung
- Hangul: 전준형
- Hanja: 田俊亨
- RR: Jeon Junhyeong
- MR: Chŏn Chunhyŏng

Jeon Jun-Hyung (Korean: 전준형; born 28 August 1986) is a South Korean footballer who currently plays for Incheon United in the K League Challenge.
