= Kim Han-sup =

South Korean footballer (born 1982)

Personal information
- Date of birth: 8 May 1982 (age 44)
- Place of birth: Incheon, South Korea
- Height: 1.77 m (5 ft 9 1/2 in)
- Position: Defender

Team information
- Current team: Yongin City FC
- Number: 25

Youth career
- 1998–2000: Yeongdeungpo Technical; High School
- 2001–2004: Dongguk University

Senior career*
Years	Team	Apps	(Gls)
2005–2006	Changwon City	34	(1)
2007–2008	Police (army)		
2009–2011	Daejeon Citizen	44	(1)
2011–2012	Incheon United	23	(0)
2013–2014	Daejeon Citizen	29	(1)
2015–	Yongin City		
- * Club domestic league appearances and goals as of 17 November 2014

- Kim Han-sup
- Hangul: 김한섭
- Hanja: 金翰燮
- RR: Gim Hanseop
- MR: Kim Hansŏp

Kim Han-sup (Korean: 김한섭; born 8 May 1982) is a South Korean football player.
