= Seol Ki-hyeon =

South Korean footballer (born 1979)

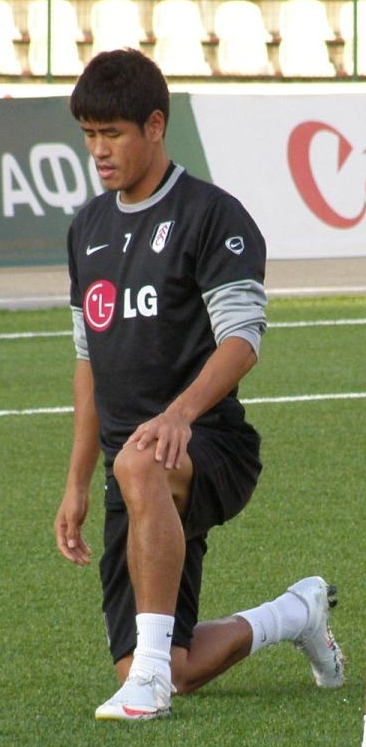
- Seol with Fulham in 2009

Personal information
- Date of birth: 8 January 1979 (age 47)
- Place of birth: Jeongseon, Gangwon, South Korea
- Height: 1.87 m (6 ft 2 in)
- Position: Winger

Team information
- Current team: Gyeongnam FC (manager)

Youth career
- 1994–1996: Gangneung Commercial High School

College career
Years	Team	Apps	(Gls)
1997–2000	Kwangwoon University		

Senior career*
Years	Team	Apps	(Gls)
2000–2001	Royal Antwerp	25	(10)
2001–2004	Anderlecht	72	(18)
2004–2006	Wolverhampton Wanderers	69	(8)
2006–2007	Reading	30	(4)
2007–2010	Fulham	18	(1)
2009	→ Al-Hilal (loan)	7	(0)
2010	Pohang Steelers	16	(7)
2011	Ulsan Hyundai	34	(5)
2012–2014	Incheon United	73	(11)
Total		344	(64)

International career
1999	South Korea U20	12	(7)
1999–2000	South Korea U23	25 (Note: Includes three appearances and one goal against non-national teams.)	(10)
2000–2009	South Korea	82	(19)

Managerial career
- 2015: Sungkyunkwan University (caretaker)
- 2016–2018: Sungkyunkwan University
- 2019–: Gyeongnam FC
Medal record
Representing South Korea
Men's football
AFC Asian Cup
Bronze medal – third place	2000 Lebanon	Team
AFC Youth Championship
Gold medal – first place	1998 Thailand	Team
- * Club domestic league appearances and goals

- Korean name
- Hangul: 설기현
- Hanja: 薛琦鉉
- RR: Seol Gihyeon
- MR: Sŏl Kihyŏn

Seol Ki-hyeon (Korean: 설기현; Hanja: 薛琦鉉; born 8 January 1979) is a South Korean former professional footballer who played as a winger. He is also the first South Korean footballer to score in the history of the UEFA Champions League, during his time at Anderlecht.

== Club career ==
=== Career in Belgium ===
In July 2000, Seol joined a Belgian club Royal Antwerp. He became the second South Korean footballer to score in double figures during a season in Europe, following Cha Bum-kun. After a successful season with Royal Antwerp, Seol moved to Anderlecht in the same league. He scored a hat-trick in the space of 12 minutes in the 2001 Belgian Super Cup. He also became the first South Korean player to score in the qualifying round of the UEFA Champions League. He won the 2003–04 Belgian First Division with Anderlecht.

=== Wolverhampton Wanderers ===
In August 2004, Seol moved to England, joining a Championship club Wolverhampton Wanderers. The Wolverhampton manager at the time, Glenn Hoddle, preferred Seol as one of his first-choice forwards, using him in various roles such as striker, attacking midfielder and winger.

Disappointed by the failure of Wolves' promotion, Seol sought Premier League clubs interested in him before the 2006 FIFA World Cup despite having two years left on his contract. He was reported as saying "At this stage, I'm frustrated not to be in the Premiership. I think there will be some good news after the World Cup."

=== Reading ===
Seol eventually joined newly promoted Premier League club Reading on 12 July 2006 for a reported transfer fee of £1.5 million. He was voted the Reading Player of the Month for August by fans after showing great performances early in the season. On 16 September 2006, he scored his first Premiership goal in a 2–1 win over Sheffield United. On 1 October 2006, he scored his second goal for Reading in a 1–0 win over West Ham United. His third goal for Reading, his first at home, came on 18 November 2006 in the 2–0 win against Charlton Athletic. However, his performance was not consistently kept during the rest of the season. He scored his fourth goal in the last game of the season against Blackburn Rovers.

=== Fulham ===
Seol left Reading for Fulham on 31 August 2007 for an undisclosed fee on a three-year contract, with Liam Rosenior going the other way. Reading boss Steve Coppell admitted that strained relations between him and Seol led to the move.

After his manager Lawrie Sanchez was replaced by Roy Hodgson, Seol wasn't chosen as Hodgson's player during the rest of the season. He scored his first goal for Fulham in a 2–1 defeat to Hull City on 16 August 2008, but he still didn't show something special the next season. On 14 January 2009, he signed an initial six-month loan move to Al-Hilal in Saudi Arabia with a view to moving permanently. However, he stated that he desired to stay at Fulham to win his place in the squad at the end of his loan deal.

Seol scored his second goal for the club in a Europa League qualifier against FK Vėtra on 30 July 2009, but he failed to made a twist for his status. On 15 January 2010, It was announced that his contract with Fulham was cancelled by mutual consent.

=== Retirement ===
Seol played for Pohang Steelers, Ulsan Hyundai, and Incheon United in the K League after leaving Fulham. During his K League career, he was criticised for poor communication with clubs and fans about his future. He announced his retirement on 2 March 2015 in order to become the interim manager of Sungkyunkwan University. His retirement ceremony took place in a friendly match between South Korea and Jamaica on 13 October 2015.

== International career ==
Seol Ki hyeonwas a participant in 2002 and 2006 FIFA World Cup. In the 2002 World Cup hosted by his country, he helped South Korea to reach the semi-finals as a starter. He also scored crucial equaliser in the round of 16 against Italy. He was nominated for the Ballon d'Or in that year.

== Managerial career ==
On 26 December 2019, Seol was appointed as manager of Gyeongnam FC.

== Media ==
Seol was sponsored by sportswear company Nike and appeared in Nike commercials. In a global Nike advertising campaign in the run up to the 2002 World Cup in Korea and Japan, he starred in a "Secret Tournament" commercial (branded "Scopion KO") directed by Terry Gilliam, appearing alongside football players such as Thierry Henry, Ronaldo, Edgar Davids, Fabio Cannavaro, Francesco Totti, Ronaldinho, Luís Figo, and Hidetoshi Nakata, with former player Eric Cantona the tournament "referee".

== Career statistics ==
=== Club ===
Appearances and goals by club, season and competition
Club	Season	League			National cup		League cup		Continental		Other		Total	
Club	Season	Division	Apps	Goals	Apps	Goals	Apps	Goals	Apps	Goals	Apps	Goals	Apps	Goals
Royal Antwerp	2000–01	Belgian First Division	25	10	2	1	—		—		—		27	11
Anderlecht	2001–02	Belgian First Division	20	3	0	0	—		3 (Note: Appearance(s) in UEFA Champions League)	1	1 (Note: Appearance in Belgian Super Cup)	3	24	7
Anderlecht	2002–03	Belgian First Division	32	12	3	0	—		8 (Note: Appearances in UEFA Europa League)	1	—		43	13
Anderlecht	2003–04	Belgian First Division	19	3	1	0	—		6	1	—		26	4
Anderlecht	2004–05	Belgian First Division	1	0	0	0	—		1	0	—		2	0
Anderlecht	Total		72	18	4	0	—		18	3	1	3	95	24
Wolverhampton Wanderers	2004–05	Championship	37	4	2	1	1	1	—		—		40	6
Wolverhampton Wanderers	2005–06	Championship	32	4	2	0	2	0	—		—		36	4
Wolverhampton Wanderers	Total		69	8	4	1	3	1	—		—		76	10
Reading	2006–07	Premier League	27	4	4	0	0	0	—		—		31	4
Reading	2007–08	Premier League	3	0	0	0	0	0	—		—		3	0
Reading	Total		30	4	4	0	0	0	—		—		34	4
Fulham	2007–08	Premier League	12	0	2	0	1	0	—		—		15	0
Fulham	2008–09	Premier League	4	1	0	0	2	0	—		—		6	1
Fulham	2009–10	Premier League	2	0	0	0	1	0	2	1	—		5	1
Fulham	Total		18	1	2	0	4	0	2	1	—		26	2
Al Hilal (loan)	2008–09	Saudi Pro League	7	0	5	0	5	1	7 (Note: Appearances in AFC Champions League)	0	—		24	1
Pohang Steelers	2010	K League	16	7	0	0	0	0	2	0	—		18	7
Ulsan Hyundai	2011	K League	34	5	4	2	7	2	—		—		45	9
Incheon United	2012	K League	40	7	1	1	—		—		—		41	8
Incheon United	2013	K League 1	26	4	3	1	—		—		—		29	5
Incheon United	2014	K League 1	7	0	0	0	—		—		—		7	0
Incheon United	Total		73	11	4	2	—		—		—		77	13
Career total			344	64	29	6	19	4	29	4	1	3	422	81

=== International ===
Appearances and goals by national team and year
National team	Year	Apps	Goals
South Korea	2000	16	6
South Korea	2001	11	1
South Korea	2002	14	3
South Korea	2003	3	0
South Korea	2004	15	2
South Korea	2005	4	0
South Korea	2006	9	4
South Korea	2007	2	0
South Korea	2008	4	2
South Korea	2009	4	1
Career total		82	19

Results list South Korea's goal tally first.

List of international goals scored by Seol Ki-hyeon
No.	Date	Venue	Opponent	Score	Result	Competition
1	5 April 2000	Seoul, South Korea	Laos	4–0	9–0	2000 AFC Asian Cup qualification
2	5 April 2000	Seoul, South Korea	Laos	8–0	9–0	2000 AFC Asian Cup qualification
3	5 April 2000	Seoul, South Korea	Laos	9–0	9–0	2000 AFC Asian Cup qualification
4	9 April 2000	Seoul, South Korea	Myanmar	1–0	4–0	2000 AFC Asian Cup qualification
5	9 April 2000	Seoul, South Korea	Myanmar	2–0	4–0	2000 AFC Asian Cup qualification
6	7 October 2000	Dubai, United Arab Emirates	Australia	3–2	4–2	2000 LG Cup
7	11 February 2001	Dubai, United Arab Emirates	United Arab Emirates	3–1	4–1	2001 Dubai Tournament
8	26 May 2002	Suwon, South Korea	France	2–1	2–3	Friendly
9	18 June 2002	Daejeon, South Korea	Italy	1–1	2–1 (a.e.t.)	2002 FIFA World Cup
10	20 November 2002	Seoul, South Korea	Brazil	1–0	2–3	Friendly
11	14 February 2004	Ulsan, South Korea	Oman	2–0	5–0	Friendly
12	31 July 2004	Jinan, China	Iran	1–1	3–4	2004 AFC Asian Cup
13	26 May 2006	Seoul, South Korea	Bosnia and Herzegovina	1–0	2–0	Friendly
14	2 September 2006	Seoul, South Korea	Iran	1–0	1–1	2007 AFC Asian Cup qualification
15	6 September 2006	Suwon, South Korea	Chinese Taipei	1–0	8–0	2007 AFC Asian Cup qualification
16	6 September 2006	Suwon, South Korea	Chinese Taipei	3–0	8–0	2007 AFC Asian Cup qualification
17	6 February 2008	Seoul, South Korea	Turkmenistan	2–0	4–0	2010 FIFA World Cup qualification
18	6 February 2008	Seoul, South Korea	Turkmenistan	4–0	4–0	2010 FIFA World Cup qualification
19	5 September 2009	Seoul, South Korea	Australia	3–1	3–1	Friendly

== Honours ==
Anderlecht

- Belgian First Division: 2003–04
- Belgian Super Cup: 2001

Al-Hilal

- Saudi Crown Prince Cup: 2008–09

Ulsan Hyundai

- Korean League Cup: 2011

South Korea U20

- AFC Youth Championship: 1998

South Korea

- AFC Asian Cup third place: 2000

Individual

- Korean FA Fans' Player of the Year: 2006
