= Nam Joon-jae =

South Korean footballer (born 1988)

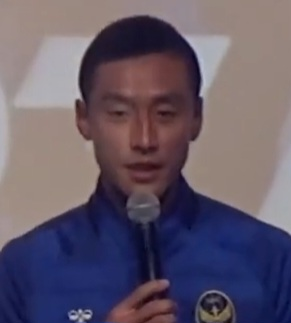
- Nam Joon-jae's

Personal information
- Full name: Nam Joon-jae
- Date of birth: April 7, 1988 (age 38)
- Place of birth: Gyeongju, Gyeongbuk, South Korea
- Height: 1.83 m (6 ft 0 in)
- Positions: Winger; striker

Team information
- Current team: Pohang Steelers

Youth career
- Yonsei University

Senior career*
Years	Team	Apps	(Gls)
2010	Incheon United	25	(3)
2011	Jeonnam Dragons	5	(0)
2011–2012	Jeju United	3	(0)
2012–2014	Incheon United	71	(15)
2015–2017	Seongnam FC	31	(4)
2016–2017	→ Asan Mugunghwa (army)	31	(4)
2018–2019	Incheon United FC	27	(5)
2019–2020	Jeju United FC	14	(3)
2020–	Pohang Steelers	7	(0)
- * Club domestic league appearances and goals as of 29 November 2019

Nam Joon-jae (Korean: 남준재; born April 7, 1988) is a South Korean football player who plays for K League 2 side Jeju United FC.
