= Kwon Jung-hyuk =

South Korean footballer (born 1978)

Kwon Jung-Hyuk 권정혁
Personal information
- Full name: Kwon Jung-Hyuk
- Date of birth: 2 August 1978 (age 48)
- Place of birth: South Korea
- Height: 1.93 m (6 ft 4 in)
- Position: Goalkeeper

Team information
- Current team: Uijeongbu FC

Youth career
- Korea University

Senior career*
Years	Team	Apps	(Gls)
2001–2006	Ulsan Hyundai Horang-i	15	(0)
2005–2006	→ Gwangju Sangmu Bulsajo (army)	14	(0)
2007	Pohang Steelers	1	(0)
2008	FC Seoul	0	(0)
2009	RoPS	20	(0)
2010	Vaasan Palloseura	22	(0)
2011–2014	Incheon United	87	(1)
2015	Gwangju FC	17	(0)
2016	Bucheon FC	0	(0)
2016–2017	Gyeongnam FC	13	(0)
2018	Uijeongbu FC	?	(?)

International career
2002	South Korea		
- * Club domestic league appearances and goals as of 4 November 2016

- Kwon Jung-hyuk
- Hangul: 권정혁
- Hanja: 權正赫
- RR: Gwon Jeonghyeok
- MR: Kwŏn Chŏnghyŏk

Kwon Jung-Hyuk (Korean: 권정혁; born 2 August 1978) is a South Korean football goalkeeper who plays for Gyeongnam FC.

He has played in his own country for Ulsan Hyundai Horang-i, Gwangju Sangmu Bulsajo (army), Pohang Steelers and FC Seoul. In 2009 Kwon signed a one-year contract with Finnish Veikkausliiga club Rovaniemen Palloseura. After the team was relegated at the end of the season, Kwon moved to Vaasan Palloseura. He was rated as the best goalkeeper in Veikkausliiga in Finnish sport magazine Veikkaaja's game to game rankings in 2010.

In 2011, he joined Incheon United. On 21 July 2013, in a 1–1 draw at Jeju United, Kwon scored his first career goal, from 85 metres (93 yd), a K-League distance record.

== Club career statistics ==
Club performance			League		Cup		League Cup		Total	
Season	Club	League	Apps	Goals	Apps	Goals	Apps	Goals	Apps	Goals
Korea Republic			League		FA Cup		K-League Cup		Total	
2001	Ulsan Hyundai	K-League	12	0	4	0	2	0	18	0
2002	Ulsan Hyundai	K-League	1	0	?	?	7	0		
2003	Ulsan Hyundai	K-League	2	0	0	0	-		2	0
2004	Ulsan Hyundai	K-League	0	0	0	0	1	0	1	0
2005	Gwangju Sangmu	K-League	0	0	1	0	0	0	1	0
2006	Gwangju Sangmu	K-League	14	0	1	0	8	0	23	0
2007	Pohang Steelers	K-League	1	0	0	0	1	0	2	0
2008	FC Seoul	K-League	0	0	0	0	0	0	0	0
Finland			League		Finnish Cup		League Cup		Total	
2009	RoPS	Veikkausliiga	20	0	0	0	5	0	25	0
2010	Vaasan Palloseura	Veikkausliiga	22	0	2	0	6	0	30	0
Korea Republic			League		FA Cup		K-League Cup		Total	
2011	Incheon United	K-League	14	0	0	0	0	0	14	0
2012	Incheon United	K-League	7	0	1	0	0	0	7	0
2013	Incheon United	K-League	18	1	1	0	0	0	19	1
Country	Korea Republic		69	1			19	0		
Country	Finland		42	0	2	0	11	0	55	0
Total			111	0			30	0		
