= Joo Hyun-jae =

South Korean footballer

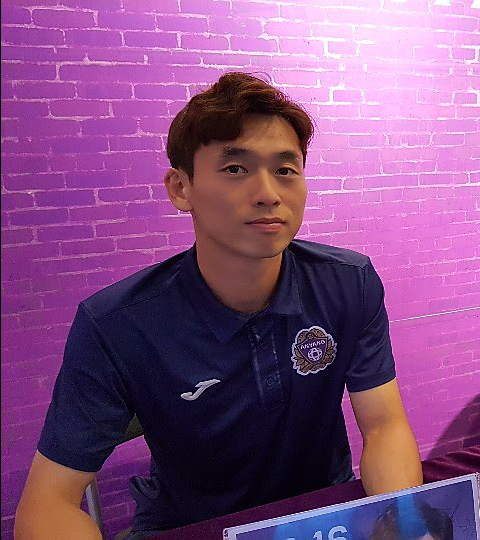
- FC Anyang's autograph session, 2019

Personal information
- Full name: Joo Hyun-jae
- Date of birth: 26 May 1989 (age 37)
- Place of birth: South Korea
- Height: 1.80 m (5 ft 11 in)
- Position: Defender

Team information
- Current team: FC Anyang
- Number: 16

Youth career
- Hongik University

Senior career*
Years	Team	Apps	(Gls)
2011–2012	Incheon United	4	(0)
2013–	FC Anyang	78	(9)
2016–2017	→ Asan Mugunghwa (army)	47	(4)
- * Club domestic league appearances and goals as of 13 November 2019

Joo Hyun-jae (Korean: 주현재; born 26 May 1989) is a South Korean footballer who plays as a defender for FC Anyang in the K League 2.
