= Kim Myung-woon =

South Korean footballer

Kim Myung-Woon
Personal information
- Full name: Kim Myung-Woon
- Date of birth: 1 November 1987 (age 38)
- Place of birth: South Korea
- Height: 1.81 m (5 ft 11 in)
- Position: Midfielder

Team information
- Current team: Incheon United

Senior career*
Years	Team	Apps	(Gls)
2007–2010	Chunnam Dragons	38	(2)
2011–	Incheon United	9	(0)
2012–2013	→ Sangju Sangmu Phoenix (army)	20	(3)

International career^{‡}
2005	South Korea U-20	2	(2)
- * Club domestic league appearances and goals ‡ National team caps and goals as of 17 December 2013

Kim Myung-Woon (Korean: 김명운; born 1 November 1987) is a South Korean footballer who plays as midfielder for Incheon United.
