= Incheon Football Stadium =

Football stadium in Incheon, South Korea

- 인천축구전용경기장
- Sungui Arena Park
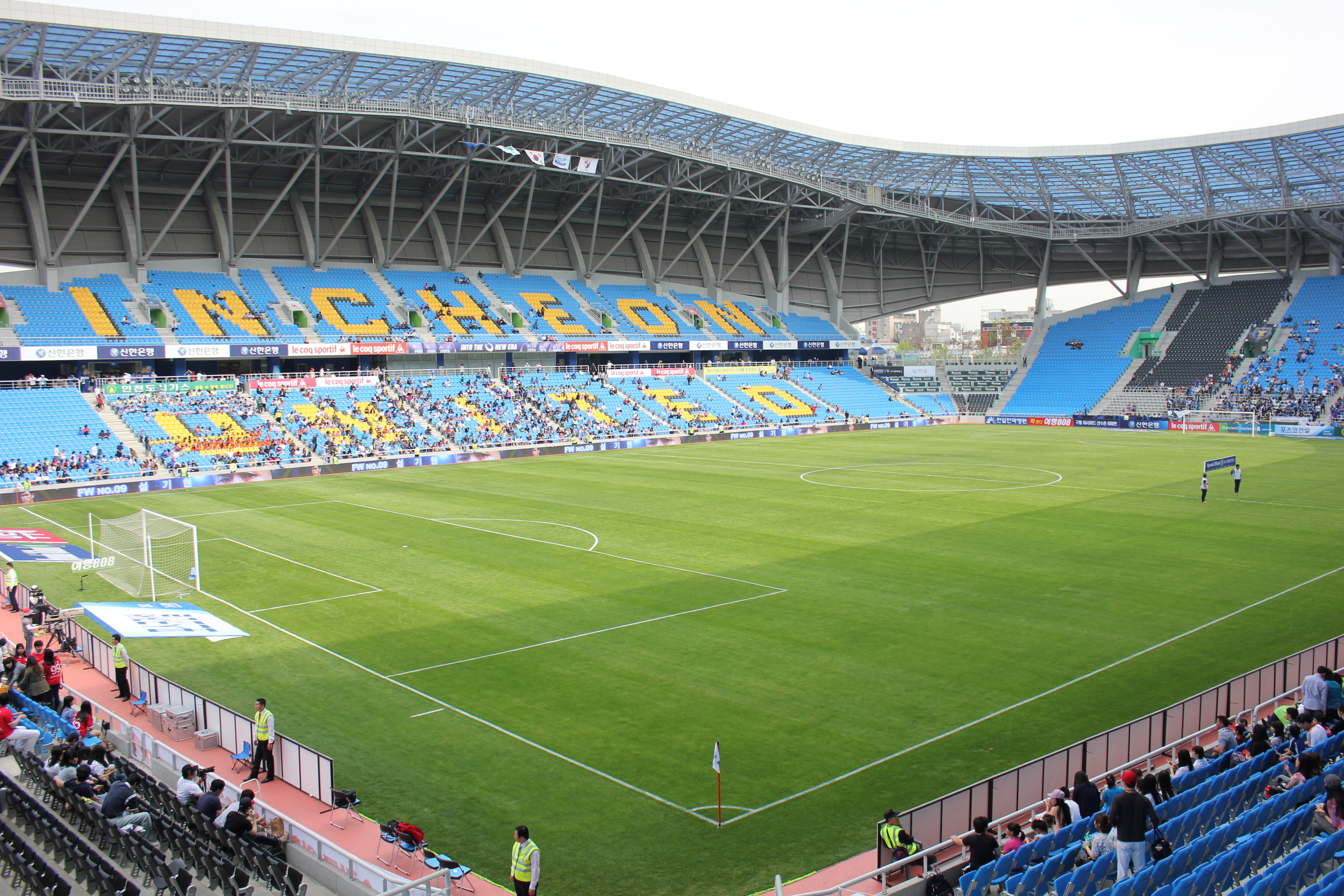
- The stadium on a matchday in May 2012
- Interactive map of Incheon Football Stadium
- Location: Jung-gu, Incheon, South Korea
- Coordinates: 37.4656°N 126.6435°E
- Capacity: 20,891
- Surface: Natural Grass
- Public transit: Seoul Metropolitan Subway: 0052A4 at Dowon

Construction
- Groundbreaking: May 5, 2008
- Opened: March 11, 2012
- Cost: $110 million

Tenants
- Incheon United (2012–present); 2014 Asian Games

Incheon Football Stadium, a.k.a. the Sungui Arena Park, is a football-specific stadium in Incheon, South Korea, and is the home ground of Incheon United of the K League. The stadium was designed with a capacity of 20,891 spectators. It replaced the much larger Incheon Munhak Stadium. On 11 March 2012, Incheon United officially had its first game since the opening of the stadium on the same day, when they played against Suwon Samsung Bluewings.

The stadium was one of the venues for the 2017 FIFA U-20 World Cup.
