= Kim Jae-woong =

South Korean footballer (born 1988)

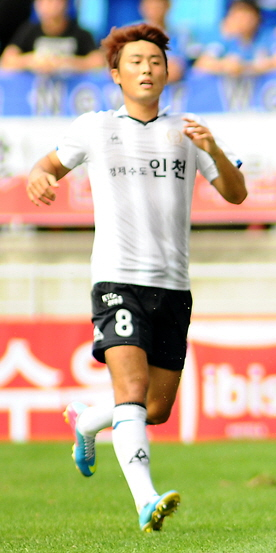

Personal information
- Full name: Kim Jae-woong
- Date of birth: 1 January 1988 (age 38)
- Place of birth: Wonju, South Korea
- Height: 1.72 m (5 ft 8 in)
- Position: Midfielder

Youth career
- 2007–2010: Kyung Hee University

Senior career*
Years	Team	Apps	(Gls)
2010	Cheonan City	6	(0)
2011–2015	Incheon United	41	(4)
2014	→ FC Anyang (loan)	27	(7)
2015–2017	Suwon FC	22	(4)
2016–2017	→ Asan Mugunghwa (army)	22	(2)
2018	Seoul E-Land	24	(0)
- * Club domestic league appearances and goals as of 1 January 2019

- Kim Jae-woong
- Hangul: 김재웅
- Hanja: 金裁雄
- RR: Gim Jaeung
- MR: Kim Chaeung

Kim Jae-woong (Korean: 김재웅; born 1 January 1988) is a South Korean football midfielder.

== Club career ==
Kim, having spent his youth career with Kyung Hee University, was selected by Incheon United from the 2011 K-League draft intake. His first game for Incheon was as a starter in the first round match of the 2011 K-League Cup against Daejeon Citizen. His made his K League debut on 20 March 2011. In just his third match in the K League, he scored his first league goal against Seongnam Ilhwa Chunma, before scoring two more to become joint top scorer for Incheon by the tenth week of the league.

Kim went on loan to the K League Challenge side FC Anyang in 2014.
