= Park Tae-min =

South Korean footballer (born 1986)

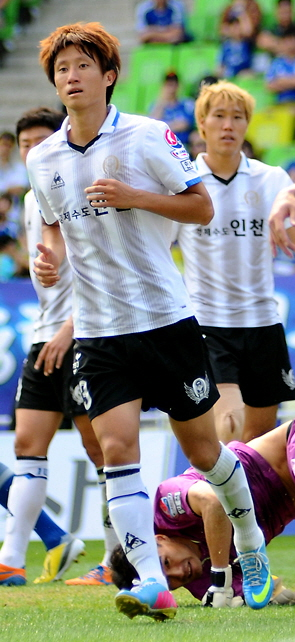

Personal information
- Date of birth: January 21, 1986 (age 40)
- Place of birth: Gokseong, South Jeolla, South Korea
- Height: 1.80 m (5 ft 11 in)
- Position: Full-back

Team information
- Current team: Seongnam FC
- Number: 37

Youth career
- 2004–2007: Yonsei University

Senior career*
Years	Team	Apps	(Gls)
2007–2010	Suwon Bluewings	6	(0)
2010–2012	Busan I'Park	18	(1)
2012–2014	Incheon United	112	(4)
2015–	Seongnam FC	28	(0)
- * Club domestic league appearances and goals as of 4 December 2020

- Park Tae-min
- Hangul: 박태민
- Hanja: 朴太民
- RR: Bak Taemin
- MR: Pak T'aemin

Park Tae-min (Korean: 박태민; born January 21, 1986) is a South Korean football player who currently plays for and captains Seongnam FC. Although Tae-min primarily plays as a left-back, he is right-footed and is also capable of playing right-back.

== Club career ==
Park was a draft pick for the Suwon Bluewings for the 2007 K-League season. Largely a bit player for Suwon, Park switched to Busan I'Park for 2011, and consequently has established himself as a regular starter for his new club. On 5 January 2012, he left Busan for Incheon United.
