= Jung In-whan =

South Korean footballer (born 1986)

Jung In-whan 정인환
Personal information
- Full name: Jung In-whan
- Date of birth: December 15, 1986 (age 39)
- Place of birth: South Korea
- Height: 1.87 m (6 ft 2 in)
- Position: Centre back

Youth career
- 2005: Yonsei University

Senior career*
Years	Team	Apps	(Gls)
2006–2007	Jeonbuk Hyundai Motors	12	(0)
2008–2010	Chunnam Dragons	44	(3)
2011–2012	Incheon United	60	(6)
2013–2014	Jeonbuk Hyundai Motors	43	(4)
2015	Henan Jianye	29	(0)
2016–2017	FC Seoul	13	(0)

International career
2003	South Korea U17	9	(2)
2004–2005	South Korea U20	23	(0)
2006–2007	South Korea U23	4	(0)
2006–2013	South Korea	5	(0)

Managerial career
- 2024: Nanjing City (assistant)
- 2024-2025: Chengdu Rongcheng (assistant)
- * Club domestic league appearances and goals as of 10 June 2017

- Jung In-whan
- Hangul: 정인환
- Hanja: 鄭仁煥
- RR: Jeong Inhwan
- MR: Chŏng Inhwan

Jung In-whan (Korean: 정인환 born December 15, 1986) is a South Korean former football player who played as a central defender.

== Career ==
He started his youth career as the football player in Baeam Highschool placed in Yongin city.

On 28 February 2015, Jung joined the Chinese Super League club Henan Jianye.

During his high school time, he was selected for the South Korean under-20 team and appeared at the 2004 AFC Youth Championship.

He debuted for the senior team on 15 August 2012 in a friendly match against Zambia.
