= Jeong Hyuk =

South Korean footballer (born 1986)

Personal information
- Full name: Jeong Hyuk
- Date of birth: May 21, 1986 (age 40)
- Place of birth: South Korea
- Height: 1.75 m (5 ft 9 in)
- Position: Midfielder

Team information
- Current team: Incheon United (assistant coach)

Youth career
- 2005–2008: Jeonju University

Senior career*
Years	Team	Apps	(Gls)
2009–2012	Incheon United	87	(8)
2013–2021	Jeonbuk Hyundai Motors	103	(10)
2015–2016	→ Ansan Police (army)	42	(3)
2020–2020	→ Gyeongnam FC (loan)	17	(2)
2021–2022	Incheon United	18	(0)

Managerial career
- 2023–2024: Seoul E-Land FC (coach)
- 2024: Jeonbuk Hyundai Motors (assistant coach)
- 2025–: Incheon United (assistant coach)
- * Club domestic league appearances and goals as of 1 January 2023

Jeong Hyuk (Korean: 정혁; Hanja: 鄭赫; born May 21, 1986) is a South Korean football coach and former player, He is an assistant coach of K League 2 club Incheon United.

Jeong Hyuk enjoyed many years at Jeonbuk Hyundai Motors, Jeong Hyuk has also extended his contract with Incheon United for the 2022 season.

For the 2023, season, he has joined K League 2 side Seoul E-Land FC as a coach.
