= Moon Sang-yun =

South Korean footballer (born 1991)

Personal information
- Date of birth: 9 January 1991 (age 35)
- Place of birth: Miryang, South Korea
- Height: 1.77 m (5 ft 9 1/2 in)
- Positions: Central midfielder; winger

Team information
- Current team: Chungbuk Cheongju
- Number: 8

Youth career
- Incheon Daegun High School
- Ajou University

Senior career*
Years	Team	Apps	(Gls)
2012–2014	Incheon United	86	(7)
2015	Jeonbuk Hyundai	9	(2)
2016–2017	Jeju United	40	(4)
2018–2019	Seongnam FC	48	(5)
2020-2021	Seoul E-Land FC	15	(0)
2022–2023	Gwangju FC	0	(0)
2024–	Chungbuk Cheongju	0	(0)

International career^{‡}
2011	South Korea U-20	2	(0)
2011–2014	South Korea U-23	10	(0)
Medal record
Representing South Korea
Men's football
Asian Games
Gold medal – first place	2014 Incheon	Team
- * Club domestic league appearances and goals as of 6 February 2022 ‡ National team caps and goals as of 11 March 2014

- Moon Sang-yun
- Hangul: 문상윤
- Hanja: 文相潤
- RR: Mun Sangyun
- MR: Mun Sangyun

Moon Sang-yun (Korean: 문상윤; born 9 January 1991) is a South Korean footballer who plays as a midfielder for Chungbuk Cheongju of K League 2.
