= Koo Bon-sang =

South Korean footballer

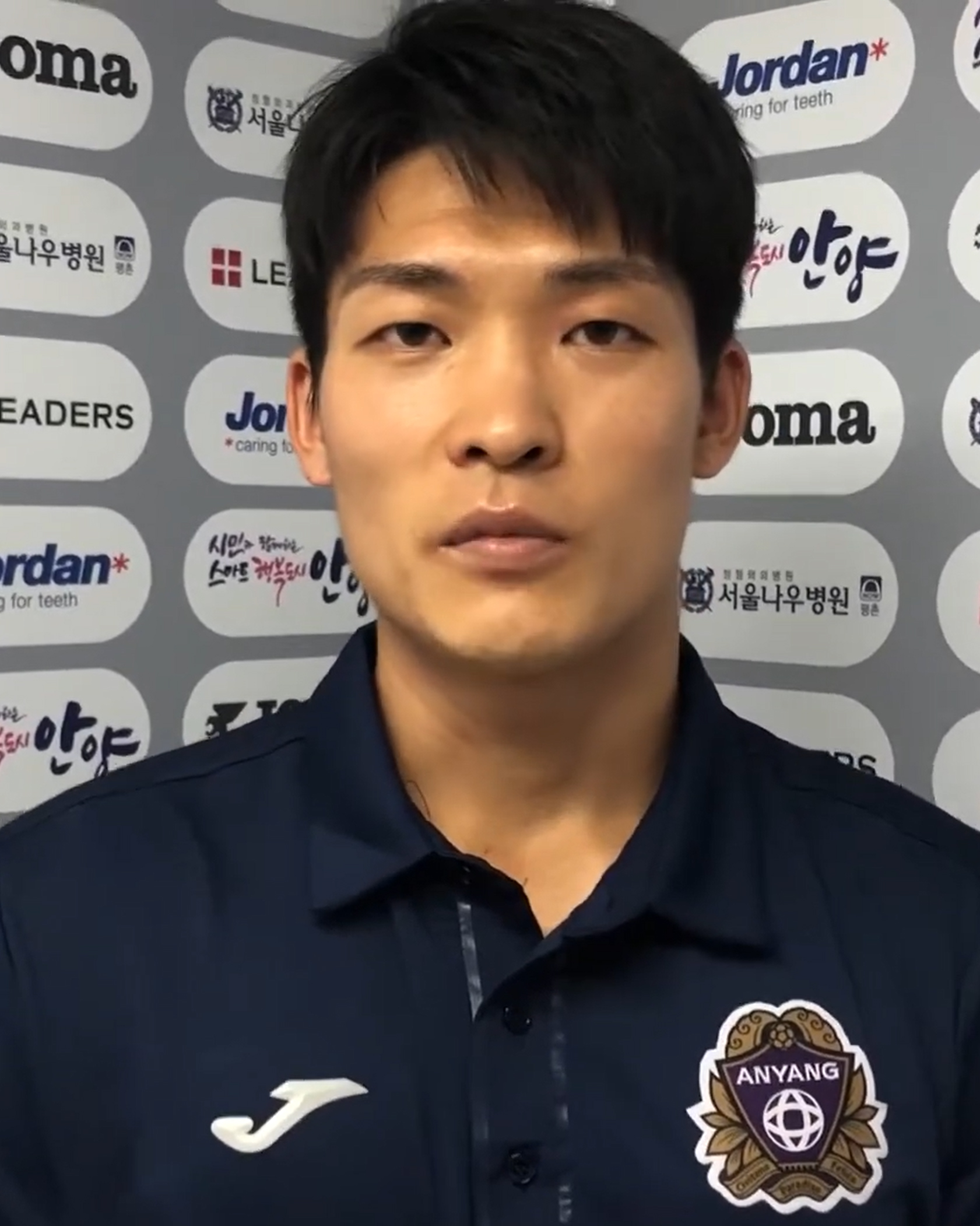
- Koo with FC Anyang in 2019

Personal information
- Date of birth: 4 October 1989 (age 37)
- Place of birth: Yongin, Gyeonggi-do, South Korea
- Height: 1.80 m (5 ft 11 in)
- Position: Defensive midfielder

Youth career
- 2005–2007: Janghoon High school
- 2008–2011: Myongji University

Senior career*
Years	Team	Apps	(Gls)
2012–2014	Incheon United	83	(0)
2015–2018	Ulsan Hyundai	44	(1)
2017–2018	→ Hwaseong FC (loan)		
2019	FC Anyang	35	(1)
2020–2021	Daejeon Hana Citizen	7	(0)
- * Club domestic league appearances and goals as of 12 January 2022

- Koo Bon-sang
- Hangul: 구본상
- Hanja: 具本祥
- RR: Gu Bonsang
- MR: Ku Ponsang

Koo Bon-sang (Korean: 구본상; born 4 October 1989) is a South Korean footballer who plays as a midfielder.
